= Sierra Peaks Section =

Mountaineering group

The Sierra Peaks Section (SPS) is a mountaineering society within the Angeles Chapter of the Sierra Club that serves to provide mountaineering activities for Sierra Club members in the Sierra Nevada, and to honor mountaineers who have summited Sierra Nevada peaks.

== History ==
The Sierra Peaks Section was established in 1955. The Section maintains historic summit registers at Bancroft Library on the University of California, Berkeley campus.

== Membership ==
To become a member of the SPS, one must be a Sierra Club member and have climbed at least six peaks on the SPS List; it is not necessary that the peaks be Emblem peaks.

Especially accomplished members are award with emblems, with the following grades (from highest to lowest):

- Third List Completion
- Second List Completion
- First List Completion
- Master Emblem
- Senior Emblem
- Emblem

Upon receiving one of the normal emblems, members may be recognized with one of the following additional emblems, which are not ranked:

- Geographic Emblem
- Explorer Emblem

== SPS List ==
To the general public, they are most known for their peak bagging list, created in 1955, a product of the Sierra Club's long legacy of promoting climbing in the Sierra Nevada. Completing the list is highly prestigious in American mountaineering circles, and climbers who complete the list are often cited as having done so (e.g. by the American Alpine Club).

The list is divided into three levels of importance. The Emblem peaks are considered the most iconic peaks of the Sierra Nevada, and to summit all of them is the goal of many peak baggers and alpinists. Mountaineers peaks are less notable peaks known for presenting mountaineering challenges; they do not have the prestige that Emblem peaks have attached to them, but ascending them is necessary to gain higher levels of recognition for Section members. Finally, there are the numerous general peaks of lesser note.

Some peaks require substantial rock climbing experience (e.g. North Palisade and Mount Clarence King), and in some cases snow travel skills. Most peaks may require few technical skills, although the commonly cited difficulty ratings of peak climbs in the Sierra Nevada are considered to be understated, or “sandbagged”. The majority of peaks are very remote and require substantial cross-country travel.

The list is an example of a subjective "decision by committee" list with the peaks on the list being determined by the Sierra Club. Peaks are occasionally added or removed from the list due to a variety of factors, such as accessibility, notability, and interest. The list is followed by thousands of hikers and climbers and has been noted in numerous books and guides on the Sierra Nevada.

There are 15 Emblem peaks, 35 Mountaineers peaks, and 197 general peaks, for a total of 247 peaks. The number of peaks is traditionally set at 248, the original number of peaks listed in 1955; however the number changes at times due to issues such as legal access or higher interest in one peak over another.

The elevations listed below are those officially described on the list (based on USGS topographic map contours), and may not be the actual elevations of those peaks, although they are usually accurate to within 50 feet.

=== Emblem Peaks ===
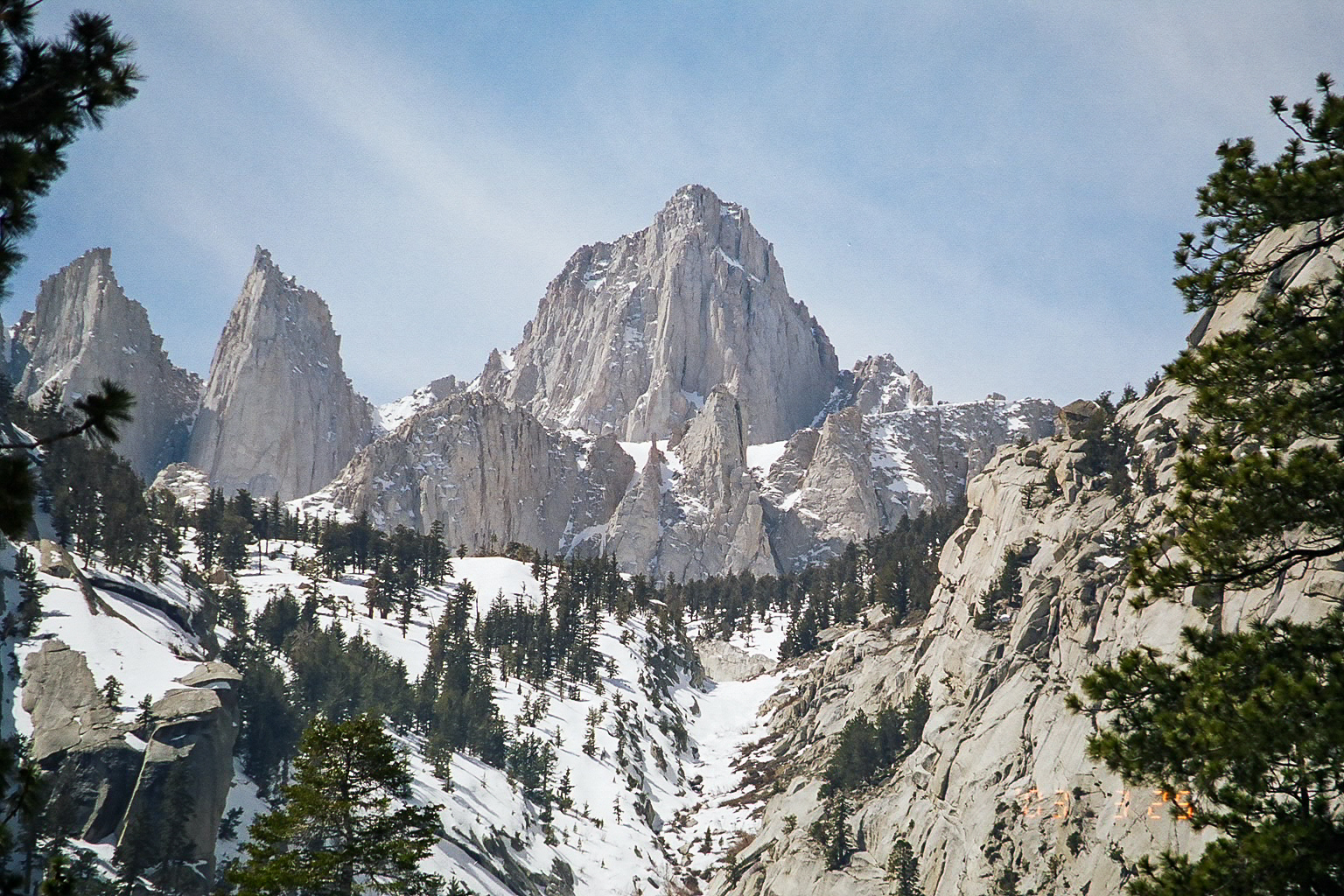
Mount Whitney, the highest peak in the contiguous United States

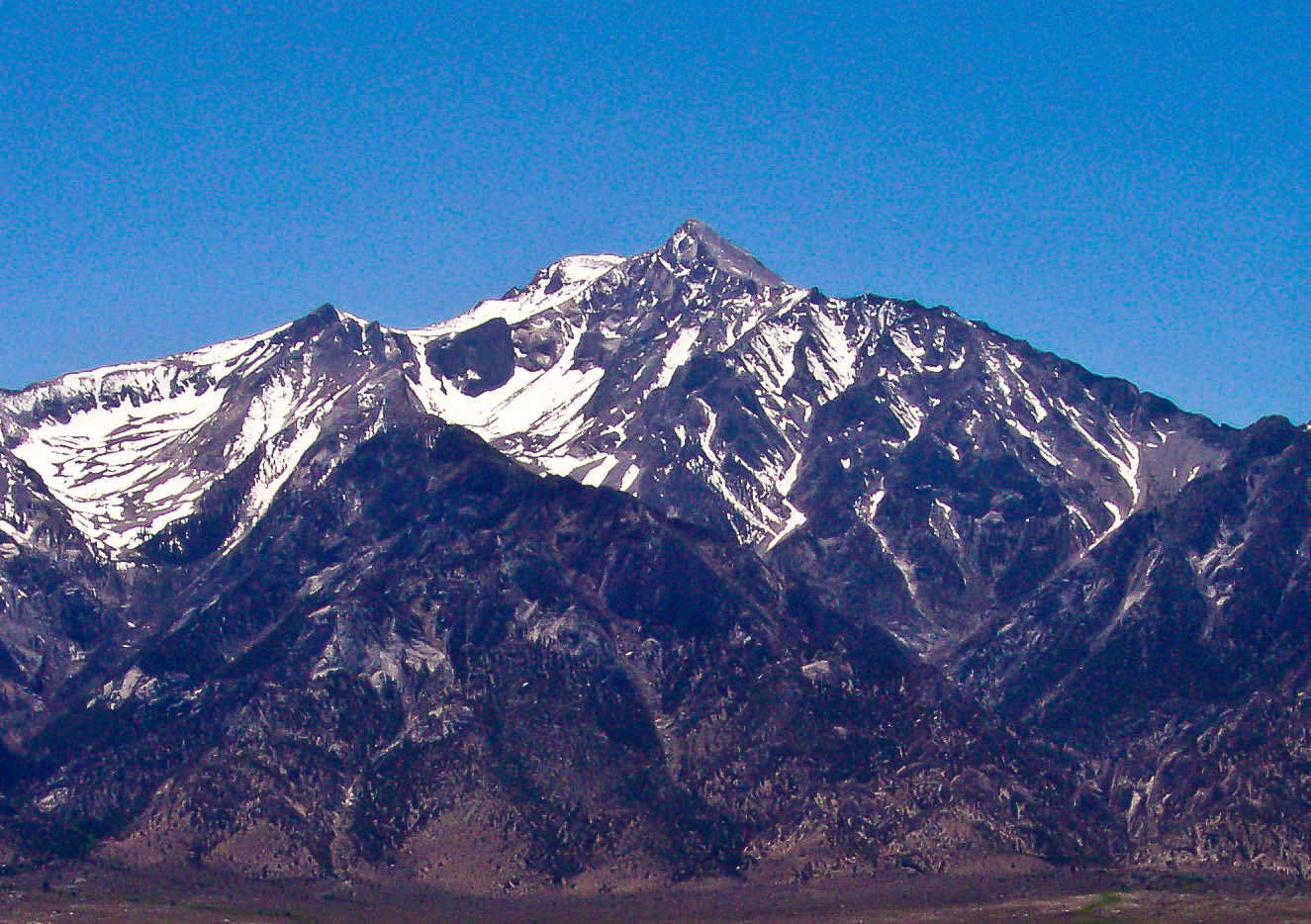
Mount Williamson

Peak	Elevation
Olancha Peak	12,123 feet (3,695 m)
Mount Whitney	14,491 feet (4,417 m)
Mount Williamson	14,370 feet (4,380 m)
Mount Kaweah	13,802 feet (4,207 m)
Mount Brewer	13,570 feet (4,140 m)
Mount Clarence King	12,907 feet (3,934 m)
Split Mountain	14,042 feet (4,280 m)
Mount Goddard	13,568 feet (4,136 m)
North Palisade	14,242 feet (4,341 m)
Mount Darwin	13,831 feet (4,216 m)
Mount Humphreys	13,986 feet (4,263 m)
Mount Abbot	13,704 feet (4,177 m)
Mount Ritter	13,143 feet (4,006 m)
Mount Lyell	13,114 feet (3,997 m)
Matterhorn Peak	12,279 feet (3,743 m)

=== Mountaineers Peaks ===
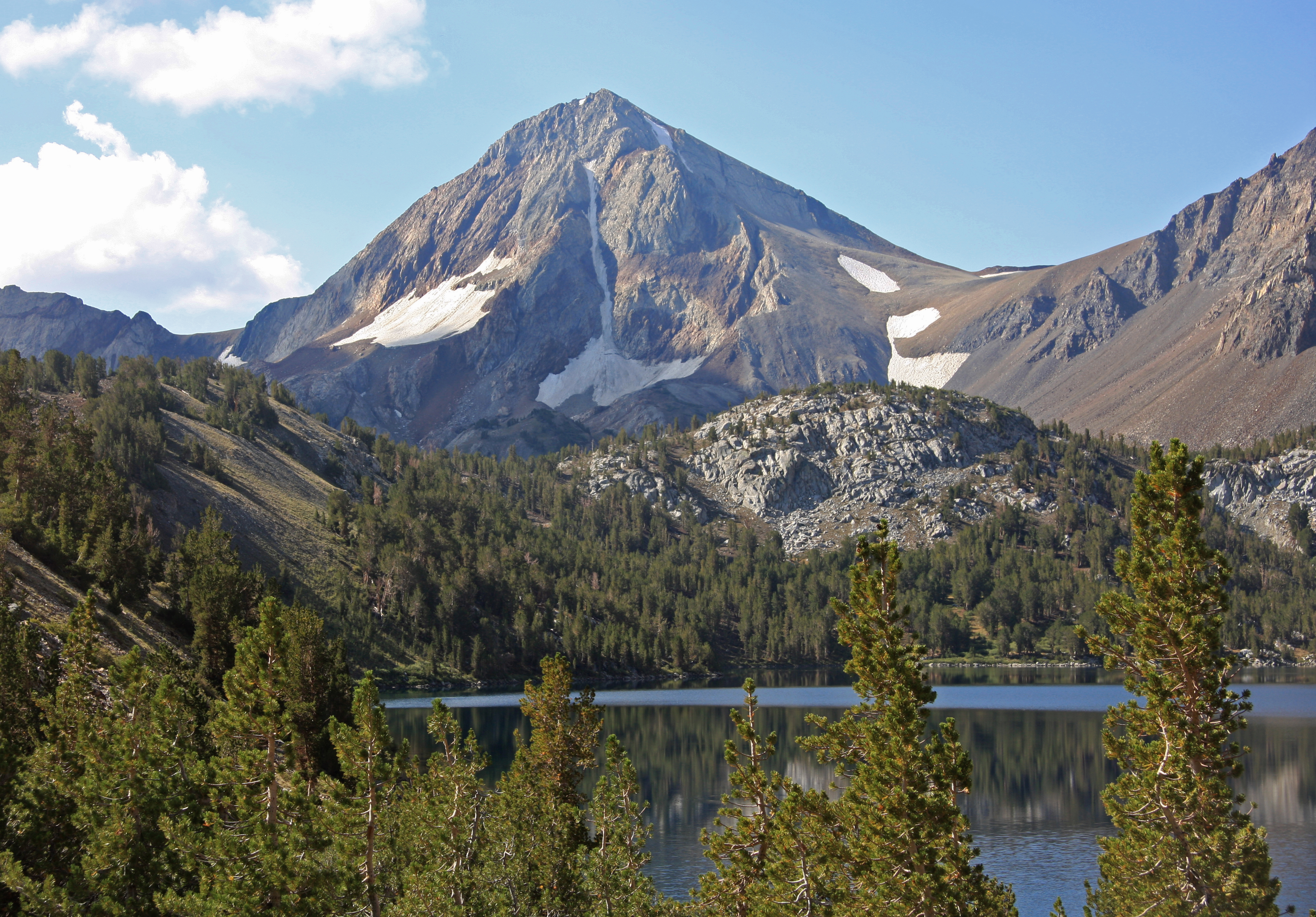
Red Slate Mountain

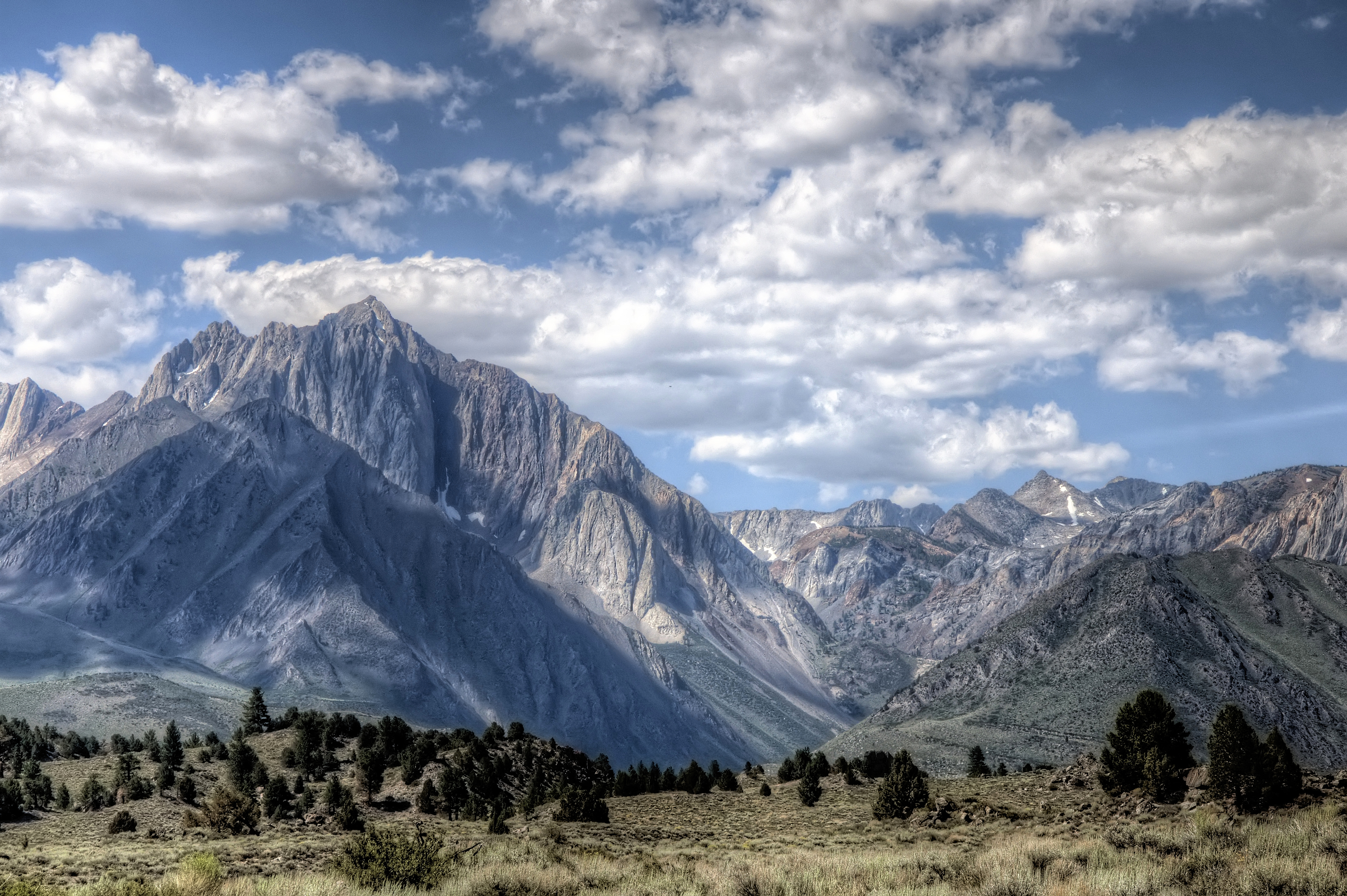
Mount Morrison

Peak	Elevation
Mount LeConte	13,930 feet (4,250 m)
Mount McAdie	13,799 feet (4,206 m)
Mount Russell	14,088 feet (4,294 m)
Black Kaweah	13,720 feet (4,180 m)
Triple Divide Peak	12,634 feet (3,851 m)
Milestone Mountain	13,638 feet (4,157 m)
Table Mountain	13,632 feet (4,155 m)
Thunder Mountain	13,517 feet (4,120 m)
Mount Ericsson	13,583 feet (4,140 m)
Deerhorn Mountain	13,281 feet (4,048 m)
East Vidette	12,356 feet (3,766 m)
Junction Peak	13,845 feet (4,220 m)
University Peak	13,589 feet (4,142 m)
Mount Gardiner	12,907 feet (3,934 m)
Arrow Peak	12,959 feet (3,950 m)
Mount Ruskin	12,920 feet (3,940 m)
Tehipite Dome	7,708 feet (2,349 m)
Middle Palisade	14,012 feet (4,271 m)
Norman Clyde Peak	13,855 feet (4,223 m)
Devil’s Crag #1	12,400 feet (3,800 m)
Mount McDuffie	13,282 feet (4,048 m)
Mount Sill	14,153 feet (4,314 m)
Thunderbolt Peak	14,003 feet (4,268 m)
The Hermit	12,328 feet (3,758 m)
Seven Gables	13,080 feet (3,990 m)
Bear Creek Spire	13,720 feet (4,180 m)
Red Slate Mountain	13,123 feet (4,000 m)
Mount Morrison	12,277 feet (3,742 m)
Clyde Minaret	12,264 feet (3,738 m)
Mount Clark	11,522 feet (3,512 m)
Mount Starr King	9,092 feet (2,771 m)
Cathedral Peak	10,911 feet (3,326 m)
Whorl Mountain	12,033 feet (3,668 m)
Tower Peak	11,755 feet (3,583 m)

=== Full list ===
==== Area 1: Southern Sierra ====
1. Pilot Knob (suspended)
2. Owens Peak
3. Spanish Needle
4. Lamont Peak
5. Sawtooth Peak
6. Rockhouse Peak
7. Taylor Dome
8. Sirretta Peak
9. Crag Peak
10. Smith Mountain

==== Area 2: Mineral King and Kern River ====
1. Kern Peak
2. Angora Mountain
3. Coyote Peaks
4. North Maggie Mountain
5. Moses Mountain
6. Homers Nose
7. Vandever Mountain
8. Florence Peak
9. Sawtooth Peak
10. Needham Mountain

==== Area 3: Olancha to Langley and west ====
1. Olancha Peak
2. Cartago Peak
3. Muah Mountain
4. Cirque Peak
5. Mount Langley
6. Mount Guyot
7. Joe Devel Peak
8. Mount Pickering
9. Mount Chamberlin
10. Mount Newcomb
11. Mount Hitchcock

==== Area 4: Corcoran to Whitney ====
1. Mount Corcoran
2. Mount LeConte
3. Mount Mallory
4. Mount Irvine
5. Mount McAdie
6. Mount Muir
7. Mount Whitney
8. Thor Peak
9. Lone Pine Peak

==== Area 5: Whitney to Williamson ====
1. Mount Young
2. Mount Hale
3. Mount Russell
4. Mount Carillon
5. Tunnabora Peak
6. Mount Barnard
7. Trojan Peak
8. Mount Tyndall
9. Mount Williamson

==== Area 6: Kaweahs and west ====
1. Alta Peak
2. Mount Silliman
3. Mount Eisen
4. Lippincott Mountain
5. Eagle Scout Peak
6. Mount Stewart
7. Lion Rock
8. Mount Kaweah
9. Red Kaweah
10. Black Kaweah
11. Picket Guard Peak
12. Kern Point

==== Area 7: Great Western Divide ====
1. Triple Divide Peak
2. Glacier Ridge
3. Whaleback
4. Milestone Mountain
5. Midway Mountain
6. Table Mountain
7. Thunder Mountain
8. South Guard
9. Mount Brewer
10. North Guard

==== Area 8: Kings–Kern divide ====
1. Mount Jordan
2. Mount Genevra
3. Mount Ericsson
4. Mount Stanford
5. Deerhorn Mountain
6. East Vidette
7. West Vidette
8. Junction Peak
9. Mount Keith
10. Mount Bradley
11. Center Peak
12. Caltech Peak

==== Area 9: Kearsarge Pass vicinity ====
1. University Peak
2. Independence Peak
3. Kearsarge Peak
4. Mount Gould
5. Mount Rixford
6. Mount Bago
7. Mount Gardiner
8. Mount Cotter
9. Mount Clarence King
10. Dragon Peak
11. Black Mountain
12. Diamond Peak

==== Area 10: Baxter Pass to Taboose Pass ====
1. Mount Baxter
2. Colosseum Mountain
3. Mount Perkins
4. Mount Wynne
5. Mount Pinchot
6. Pyramid Peak
7. Arrow Peak
8. Striped Mountain
9. Goodale Mountain
10. Cardinal Mountain

==== Area 11: Western mid-Sierra ====
1. Mount Ruskin
2. Marion Peak
3. State Peak
4. Goat Mountain
5. Kennedy Mountain
6. Mount Harrington
7. Tehipite Dome
8. Spanish Mountain
9. Three Sisters

==== Area 12: South Palisades ====
1. Split Mountain
2. Mount Tinemaha
3. Mount Prater
4. Mount Bolton Brown
5. Birch Mountain
6. The Thumb
7. Disappointment Peak
8. Middle Palisade
9. Norman Clyde Peak
10. Palisade Crest

==== Area 13: Mt. Goddard vicinity ====
1. Observation Peak
2. Giraud Peak
3. Devil's Crag #1
4. Wheel Mountain
5. Mount McDuffie
6. Black Giant
7. Charybdis
8. Scylla
9. Mount Goddard
10. Mount Reinstein
11. Finger Peak
12. Tunemah Peak

==== Area 14: North Palisades ====
1. Temple Crag
2. Mount Gayley
3. Mount Sill
4. North Palisade
5. Thunderbolt Peak
6. Mount Winchell
7. Mount Agassiz
8. Mount Goode
9. Cloudripper
10. Mount Johnson
11. Mount Gilbert

==== Area 15: Evolution area ====
1. Mount Thompson
2. Point Powell
3. Mount Wallace
4. Mount Haeckel
5. Mount Fiske
6. Mount Huxley
7. Mount Darwin
8. Mount Mendel
9. Mount Lamarck
10. The Hermit
11. Mount McGee
12. Emerald Peak
13. Mount Henry

==== Area 16: Humphreys Basin and west ====
1. Mount Goethe
2. Mount Emerson
3. Mount Humphreys
4. Basin Mountain
5. Four Gables
6. Mount Tom
7. Pilot Knob
8. Gemini
9. Seven Gables
10. Mount Senger
11. Mount Hooper

==== Area 17: Bear Creek Spire area ====
1. Merriam Peak
2. Royce Peak
3. Mount Julius Caesar
4. Mount Hilgard
5. Recess Peak
6. Mount Gabb
7. Bear Creek Spire
8. Mount Dade
9. Mount Abbot
10. Mount Mills
11. Mount Morgan

==== Area 18: Mono Creek to Mammoth ====
1. Silver Peak
2. Mount Izaak Walton
3. Red and White Mountain
4. Red Slate Mountain
5. Mount Stanford
6. Mount Morgan
7. Mount Baldwin
8. Mount Morrison
9. Bloody Mountain

==== Area 19: Ritter Range and vicinity ====
1. Iron Mountain
2. Clyde Minaret
3. Mount Ritter
4. Banner Peak
5. Mount Davis
6. Rodgers Peak
7. Electra Peak
8. Foerster Peak
9. San Joaquin Mountain

==== Area 20: Clark Range and vicinity ====
1. Merced Peak
2. Red Peak
3. Gray Peak
4. Mount Clark
5. Mount Starr King
6. Half Dome
7. Clouds Rest

==== Area 21: Mt. Lyell and north ====
1. Cathedral Peak
2. Vogelsang Peak
3. Mount Florence
4. Mount Maclure
5. Mount Lyell
6. Koip Peak
7. Mount Gibbs
8. Mount Dana

==== Area 22: Tioga Pass to Bond Pass ====
1. Mount Warren
2. Mount Conness
3. North Peak
4. Excelsior Mountain
5. Dunderberg Peak
6. Virginia Peak
7. Twin Peaks
8. Whorl Mountain
9. Matterhorn Peak
10. Pettit Peak
11. Volunteer Peak
12. Piute Mountain
13. Tower Peak

==== Area 23: Bond Pass to Lake Tahoe ====
1. Black Hawk Mountain
2. Leavitt Peak
3. Stanislaus Peak
4. Disaster Peak
5. Highland Peak
6. Mokelumne Peak
7. Round Top
8. Freel Peak
9. Pyramid Peak
10. Dicks Peak
11. Mount Tallac

==== Area 24: Northern Sierra ====
1. Granite Chief
2. Tinker Knob
3. Castle Peak
4. Mount Rose
5. Mount Lola
6. English Mountain
7. Sierra Buttes
8. Mount Elwell
9. Adams Peak

== See also ==
Other peak bagging lists:

- New England Fifty Finest
- Adirondack High Peaks

== Bibliography ==
- Secor, R. J. (2009). The High Sierra : peaks, passes, trail. Seattle, WA: Mountaineers Books. ISBN 978-0-89886-971-2.
