= Mount Starr King =

Two mountains are named Mount Starr King in honor of Thomas Starr King (1824—1864):

- Mount Starr King (New Hampshire)
- Mount Starr King (California)
