= Whaleback (disambiguation) =

A whaleback is a type of steamship.

Whaleback may also refer to:

== Places ==
- Whaleback (California), a mountain ridge in Kings Canyon National Park
- Whaleback (ski area), a recreation area on Whaleback Mountain in New Hampshire
- Whaleback Mountain (Oregon), location of the Whaleback Snow-Survey Cabin, listed on the National Register of Historic Places
- Whaleback Mountain, in Yoho National Park, Canada
- Whaleback Rocks, off the coast of Antarctica
- Mount Whaleback, in Australia
  - Mount Whaleback mine
- a terrace outside the hamlet of Yeavering, in Northumberland, England

== Other ==
- the back of a whale
- a type of tender in rail transport
- an alternate name for a bornhardt
- an alternate name for a roche moutonnée
- a lava spine which existed in the crater of Mount St. Helens, Washington, from 2004 to 2005
- the "Whale's Back", a section of Maine State Route 9
