= Mount Julius Caesar =

Mountain in the American state of California

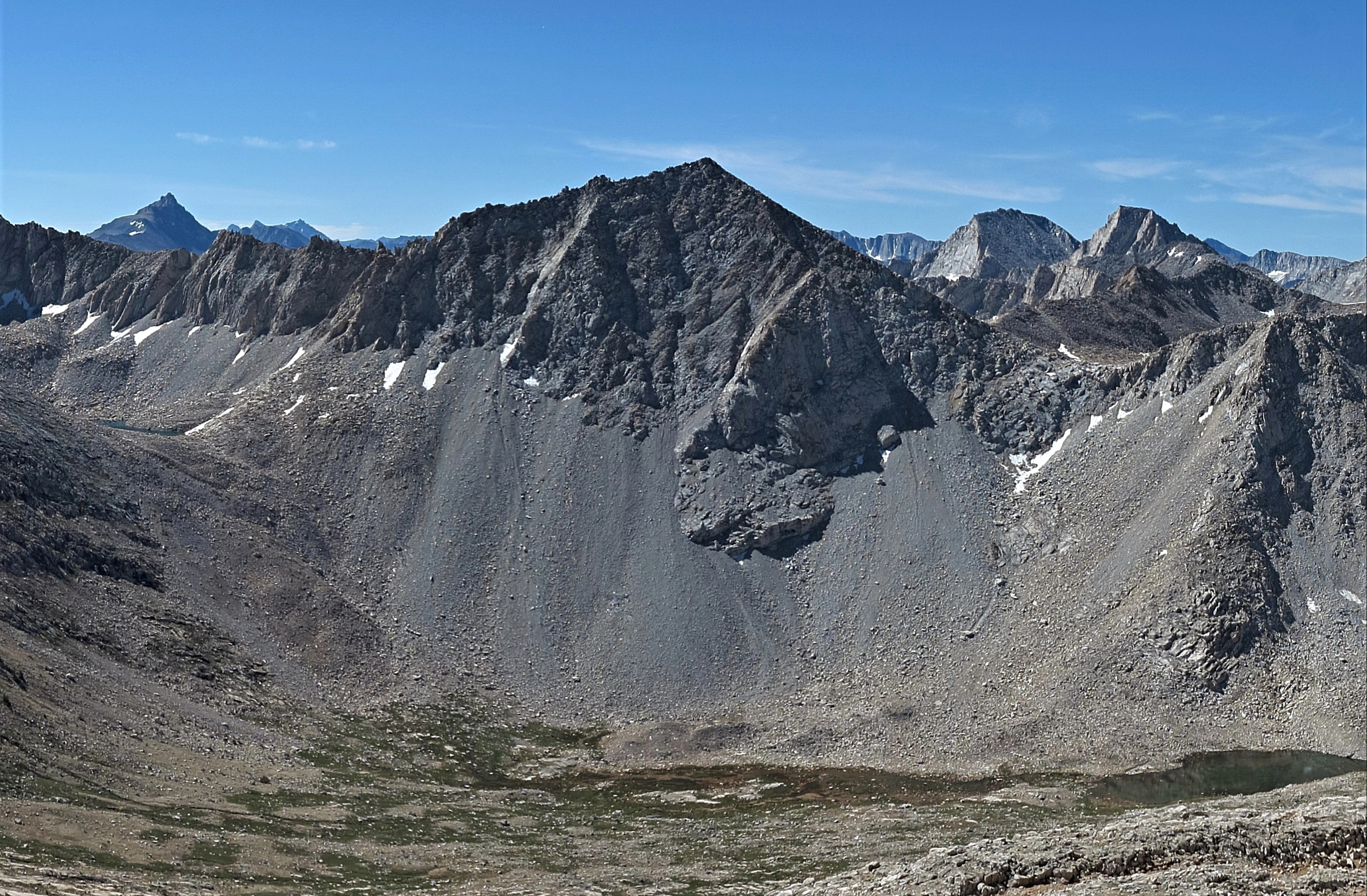
- North aspect

Highest point
- Elevation: 13,213 ft (4,027 m)
- Prominence: 440 ft (134 m)
- Parent peak: Bear Creek Spire (13,726 ft)
- Isolation: 1.09 mi (1.75 km)
- Listing: Sierra Peaks Section; Vagmarken Club Sierra Crest List
- Coordinates: 37°21′24″N 118°46′54″W

Naming
- Etymology: Julius Caesar

Geography
- Location within California Location within the United States
- Country: United States
- State: California
- County: Fresno / Inyo
- Protected area: John Muir Wilderness
- Parent range: Sierra Nevada
- Topo map: USGS Mount Hilgard

Geology
- Rock age: Cretaceous
- Mountain type: Fault block
- Rock type: granitic

Climbing
- First ascent: 1928
- Easiest route: class 2

Mount Julius Caesar is a 13,213-foot-elevation (4,027-meter) mountain summit located on the crest of the Sierra Nevada mountain range in northern California, United States. It is situated in the John Muir Wilderness on the boundary that Sierra National Forest shares with Inyo National Forest, and along the common border shared by Fresno County with Inyo County. It is one mile southwest of line parent Bear Creek Spire, and 22 miles (35 km) west of the community of Bishop. Italy Pass is one-half mile immediately south of the summit, and Granite Park lies to the southeast. Mount Julius Caesar ranks as the 106th-highest summit in California. Topographic relief is significant as the summit rises 2,000 feet (610 meters) above Lake Italy in 0.7 miles (1.1 km).

== History ==
The first ascent of the summit was made August 12, 1928, by Alfred and Myrtle Prater. This landform was named by the first ascent party to honor Julius Caesar, with the connection attributable to its position overlooking Lake Italy. The north face and east arête was climbed August 9, 1953, by Jim Koontz, Pete Murphy, Al Wolf, and Ed Toby. The first winter ascent was made March 18, 1965, by Tom Ross and Peter Lewis. The present spelling of the toponym was officially adopted in 1978 by the U.S. Board on Geographic Names.

== Climate ==
According to the Köppen climate classification system, Mount Julius Caesar is located in an alpine climate zone. Most weather fronts originate in the Pacific Ocean, and travel east toward the Sierra Nevada mountains. As fronts approach, they are forced upward by the peaks (orographic lift), causing them to drop their moisture in the form of rain or snowfall onto the range. Precipitation runoff from the west side of this mountain drains into Lake Italy which is within the San Joaquin River watershed, and from the east side to Pine Creek, thence Owens Valley.

== Gallery ==
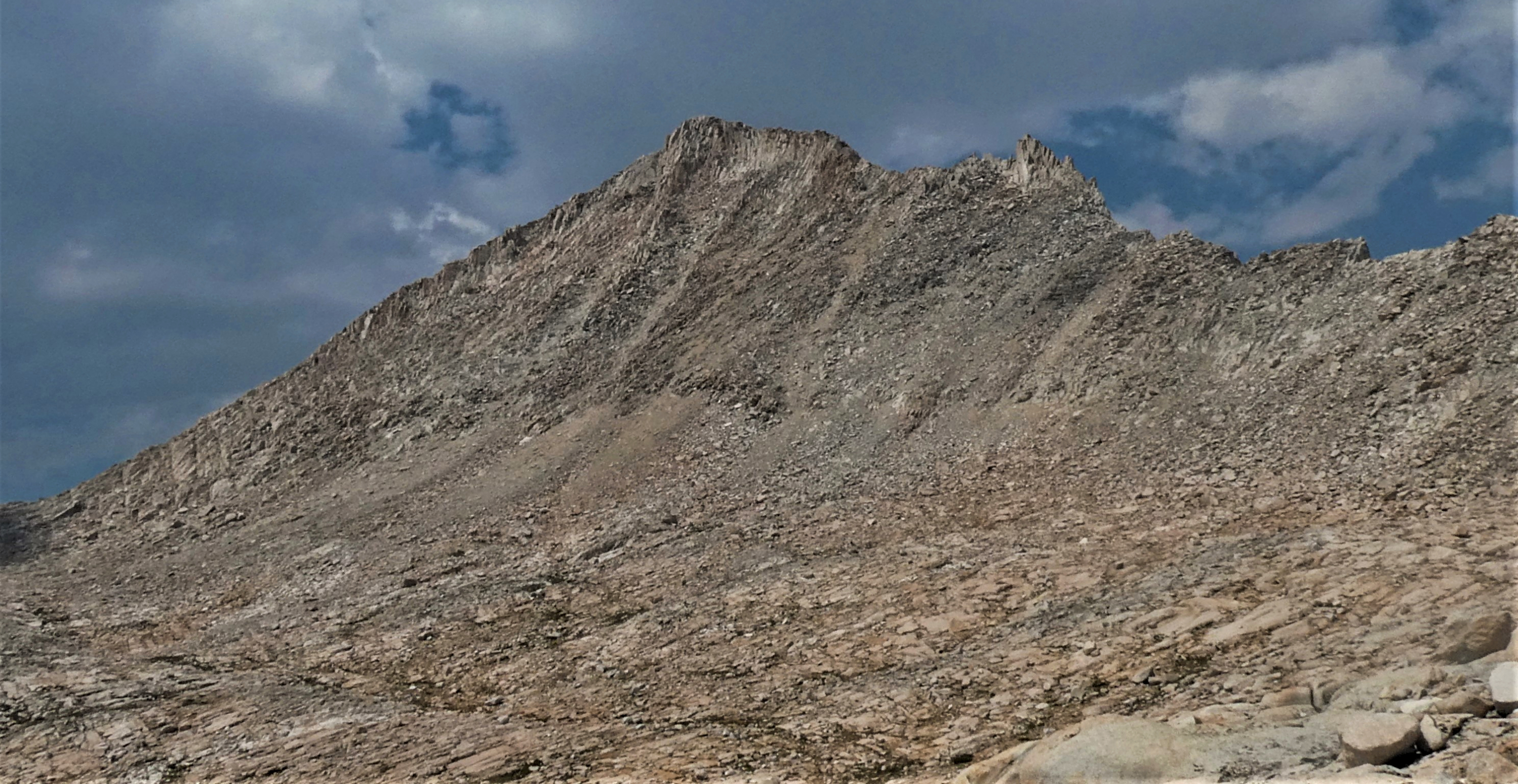
South aspect

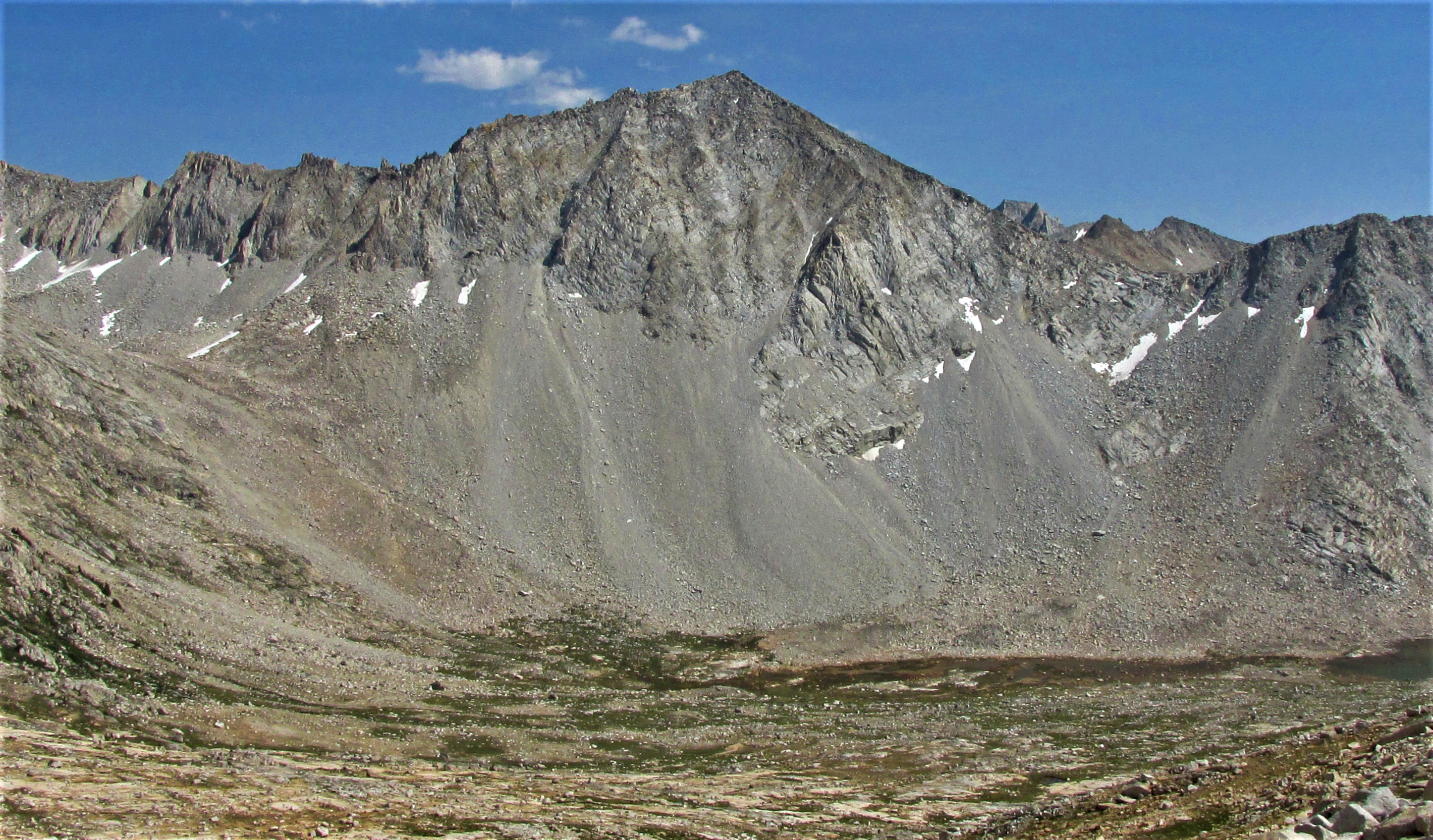
North aspect

== See also ==
- List of the major 4000-meter summits of California
