= Kennedy Mountain (Fresno County, California) =

Mountain in California, United States

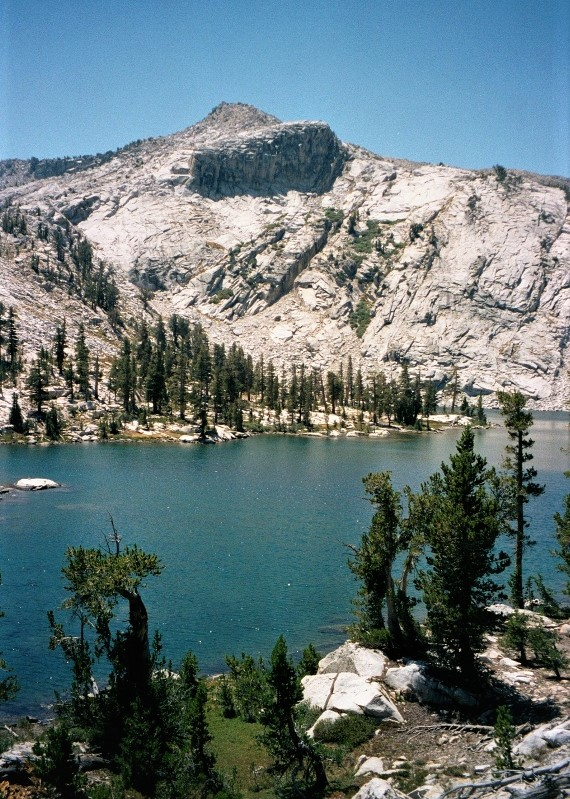
- North aspect, with West Kennedy Lake

Highest point
- Elevation: 11,433 ft (3,485 m)
- Prominence: 673 ft (205 m)
- Isolation: 1.94 mi (3.12 km)
- Listing: Sierra Peaks Section
- Coordinates: 36°52′45″N 118°40′05″W

Geography
- Location within California Location within the United States
- Location: Kings Canyon National Park; Fresno County, California, U.S.
- Parent range: Sierra Nevada
- Topo map: USGS Slide Bluffs

Geology
- Rock type: granitic

Climbing
- Easiest route: class 2 via Kennedy Pass

Kennedy Mountain is an 11,433-foot-elevation (3,485-meter) summit located in Fresno County, California, United States. It is situated in Kings Canyon National Park, on Monarch Divide which is west of the crest of the Sierra Nevada mountain range. Mount Harrington is four miles to the west along the divide, and Kennedy Pass less than a mile east. Kennedy Mountain ranks as the 569th-highest summit in California, and topographic relief is significant as the northeast aspect rises 2,000 feet (610 meters) above Kennedy Canyon in approximately one mile. The first ascent of the summit was made by a 1903 USGS survey party, and likely named for one of the agency's employees. Inclusion on the Sierra Peaks Section peakbagging list generates climbing interest. This landform's toponym has been officially adopted by the U.S. Board on Geographic Names.

== Climate ==
According to the Köppen climate classification system, Kennedy Mountain is located in an alpine climate zone. Most weather fronts originate in the Pacific Ocean, and travel east toward the Sierra Nevada mountains. As fronts approach, they are forced upward by the peaks (orographic lift), causing them to drop their moisture in the form of rain or snowfall onto the range. Precipitation runoff from this mountain drains into tributaries of the Kings River.

== See also ==
- List of mountain peaks of California
