= Mount Gardiner =

Mount Gardiner may refer to:

- Mount Gardiner (Antarctica), a mountain in the Queen Maud Mountains of Antarctica
- Mount Gardiner (British Columbia), a mountain in southwestern British Columbia, Canada
- Mount Gardiner (California), a mountain in the Sierra Nevada, Canada
- Mount Gardiner, Queensland is a rural location in Queensland, Australia

== See also ==
- Mount Gardner (disambiguation)
