= Mount Clarence King =

Mountain in the American state of California

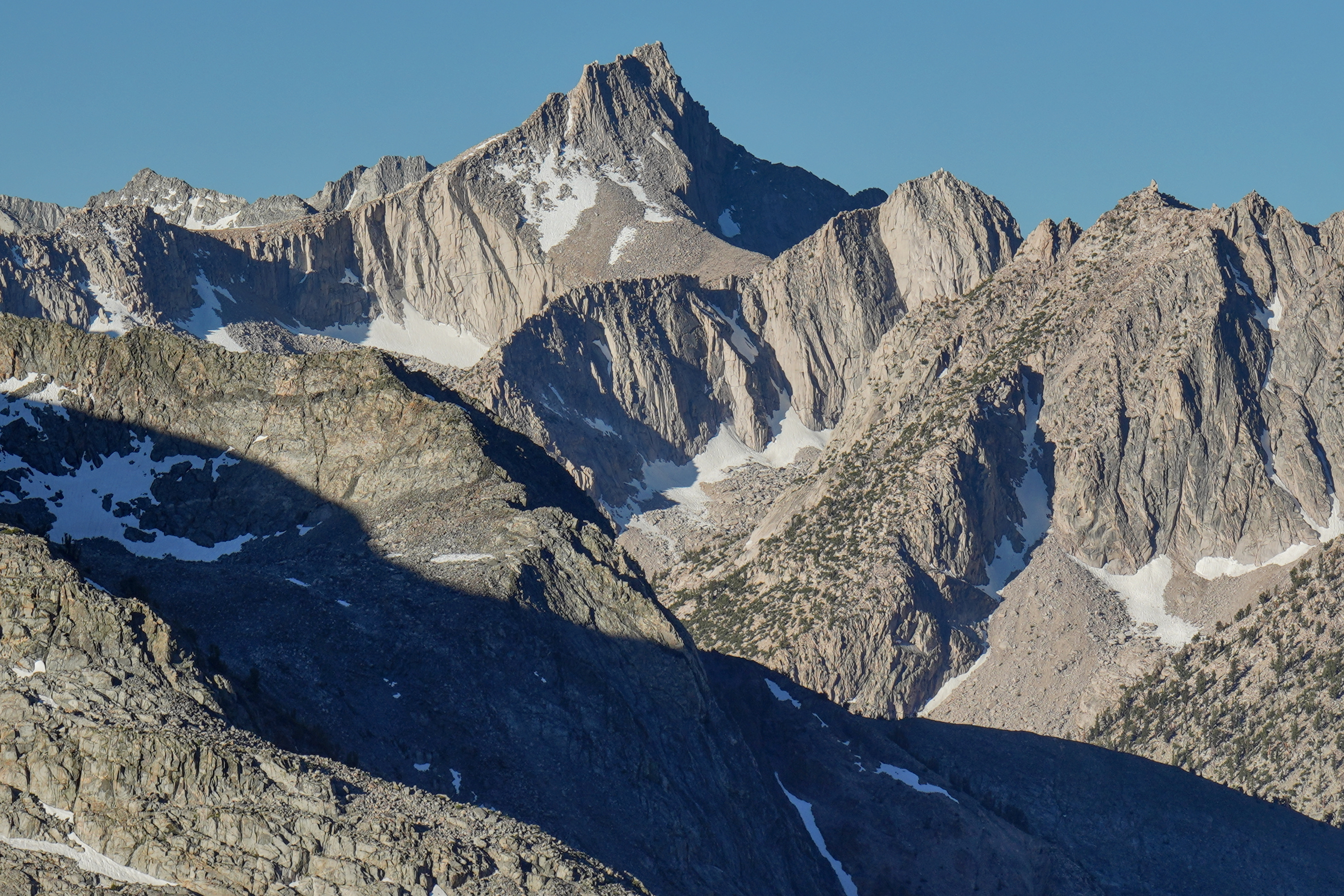
- North aspect

Highest point
- Elevation: 12,867+ ft (3922+ m) NAVD 88
- Prominence: 1,149 ft (350 m)
- Parent peak: Mount Gould
- Listing: SPS Emblem peak; Western States Climbers Star peak
- Coordinates: 36°50′00″N 118°26′47″W

Geography
- Location within California Location within the United States
- Location: Fresno County, California, U.S.
- Parent range: Sierra Nevada
- Topo map: USGS Mount Clarence King

Climbing
- First ascent: 1896 by Bolton C. Brown
- Easiest route: Technical, class 5.4

Mount Clarence King, located in the Kings Canyon National Park, is named for Clarence King, who worked on the Whitney Survey, the first geological survey of California. King later became the first chief of the United States Geological Survey.

The Peak is located along King Spur, a sub-range of the California's Sierra Nevada. It is north of Mount Cotter, northeast of Gardiner Basin, and west of Sixty Lakes Basin and the John Muir Trail. The first ascent was recorded by painter and lithographer Bolton Brown.

== Climate ==
According to the Köppen climate classification system, Mount Clarence King is located in an alpine climate zone. Weather fronts coming off the Pacific Ocean travel east toward the Sierra Nevada mountains. As fronts approach, they are forced upward by the peaks (orographic lift), causing them to drop their moisture in the form of rain or snowfall onto the range.

== Gallery ==
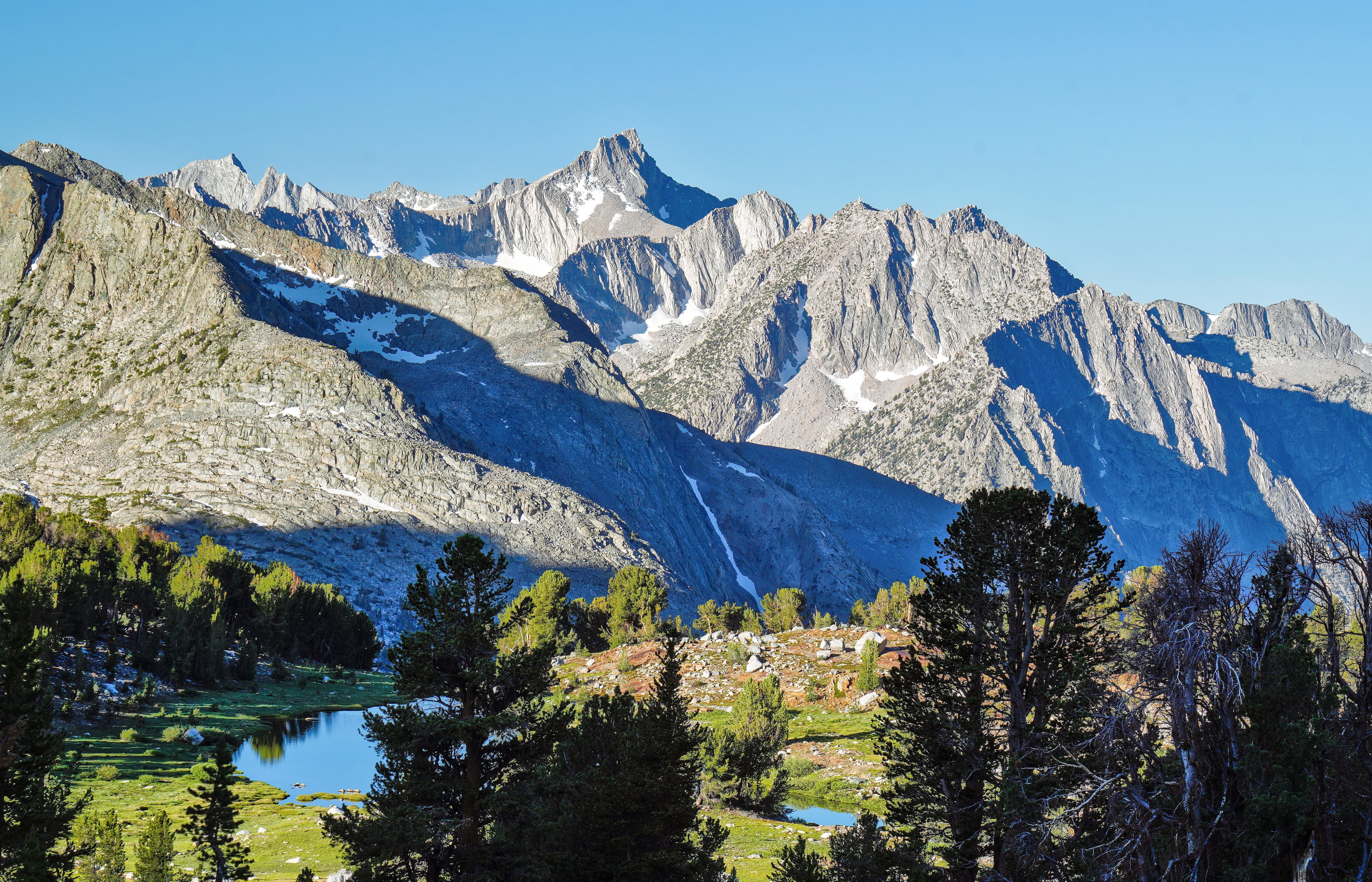
Mount Clarence King from the north

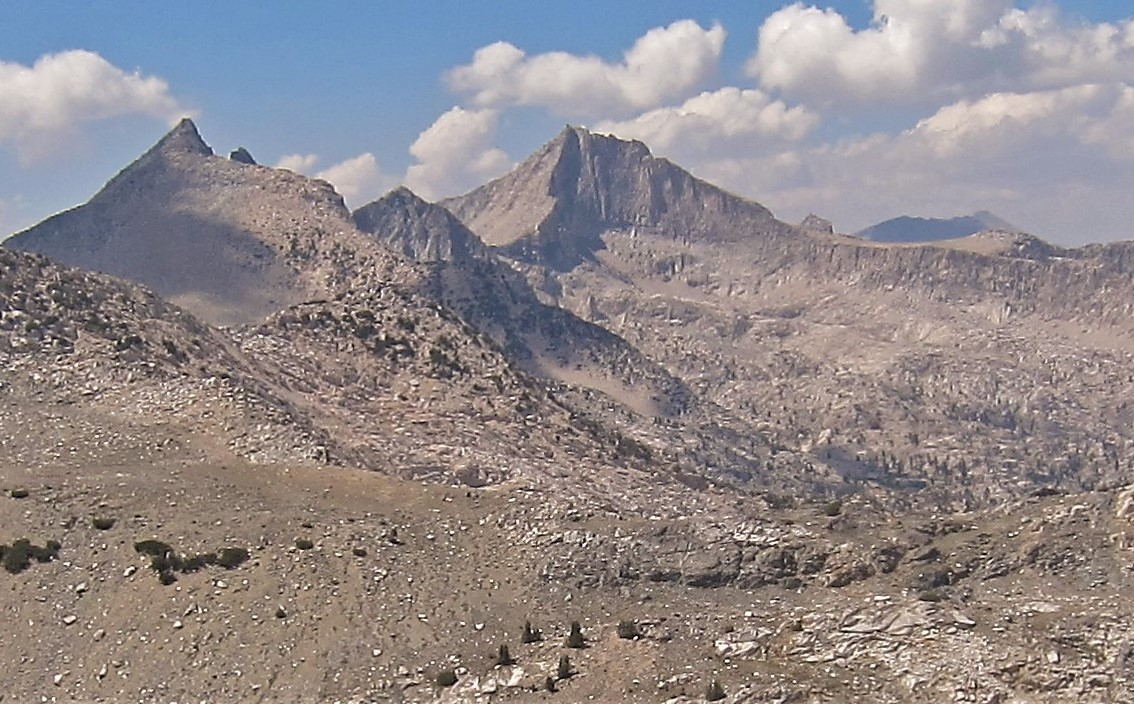
Mount Clarence King centered
(from Glen Pass, Mt. Cotter to left)

== See also ==
- List of mountain peaks of California
