= Sirretta Peak =

Mountain in California, United States

- Location within California

Highest point
- Elevation: 9,982 ft (3,043 m) NAVD 88
- Prominence: 97 ft (30 m)
- Listing: Sierra Peaks Section
- Coordinates: 35°55′28″N 118°19′59″W

Geography
- Location: Tulare County, California, U.S.
- Parent range: Sierra Nevada
- Topo map: USGS Sirretta Peak

Climbing
- Easiest route: Hike, class 1

Sirretta Peak is a mountain located in the southern Sierra Nevada in California. It rises to an elevation of 9,982 feet (3,043 m) north of Highway 178 and Lake Isabella. The high elevation means that most of the precipitation the mountain receives is snow.

== See also ==
- Sequoia National Forest
