= Mount McAdie =

Mountain in the state of California

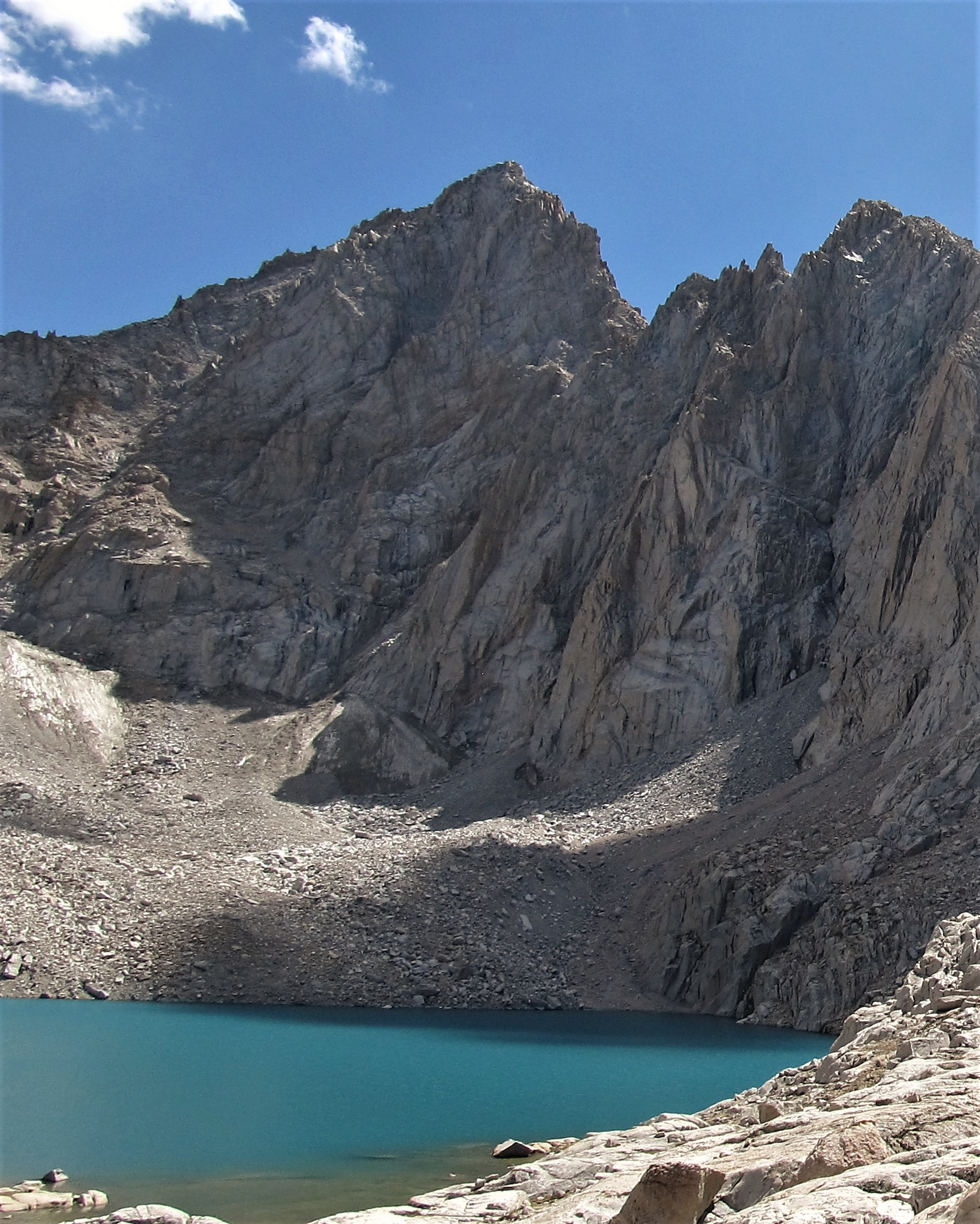
- Northern aspect, with Consultation Lake

Highest point
- Elevation: 13,805 ft (4,208 m) NAVD 88
- Prominence: 479 ft (146 m)
- Parent peak: Mount Whitney
- Listing: SPS Mountaineers Peak; Western States Climbers Star peak; Vagmarken Sierra Crest List
- Coordinates: 36°33′06″N 118°16′35″W

Geography
- Location within California
- Location: Inyo / Tulare counties, California, U.S.
- Parent range: Sierra Nevada
- Topo map: USGS Mount Whitney

Climbing
- First ascent: 1922 by Norman Clyde
- Easiest route: Exposed scramble, class 3

Mount McAdie is a summit on the crest of the Sierra Nevada, and is located 2.1 miles (3.4 km) south of Mount Whitney. It has three summits, with the north peak being the highest. The summit ridge marks the boundary between Sequoia National Park and the John Muir Wilderness. It is also on the boundary between Inyo and Tulare counties. Lone Pine, 12.4 miles (20.0 km) to the northeast, is in the Owens Valley on U.S. 395.

In 1905, the mountain was named in honor of Alexander G. McAdie by James E. Church. McAdie ran the U.S. Weather Bureau in San Francisco at the time, and had visited the summit of Mount Whitney in 1903. The name first appeared on a map in 1956 with the publication of the USGS, 15 minute, Mount Whitney Quadrangle topographic map.

The north summit can be reached from Arc Pass, and was first climbed by Norman Clyde in 1922. The west face was first climbed in 1954, and is a class 4 ascent. In 1968, capable rock climber 27-year-old Anita Ossofsky and a fellow climber, who were well qualified and properly equipped, ascended class 3 terrain on Mt. McAdie in good weather from Arc Pass, traversed from the east face of Middle Peak to the gulley (which divides Middle and North Peaks), and at the top of the gulley, apparently a hand-hold of Ossofsky's gave way. She fell approximately 10 feet to a ledge, from which she rolled off and fell about an additional 150 feet before coming to rest in the gulley, dying immediately.

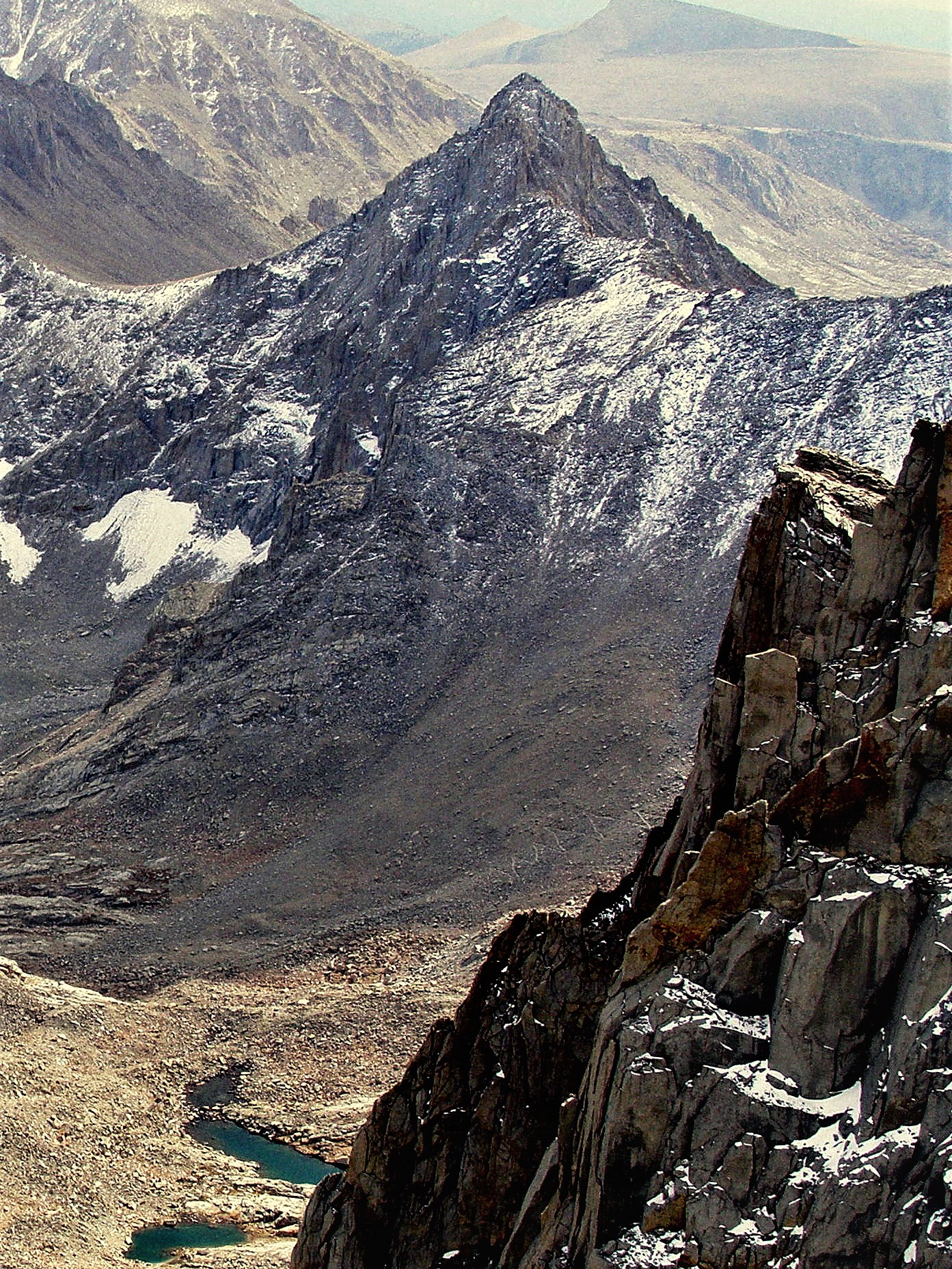
Mount McAdie from the summit of Whitney
