= Goat Mountain (Fresno County, California) =

Mountain in California, United States

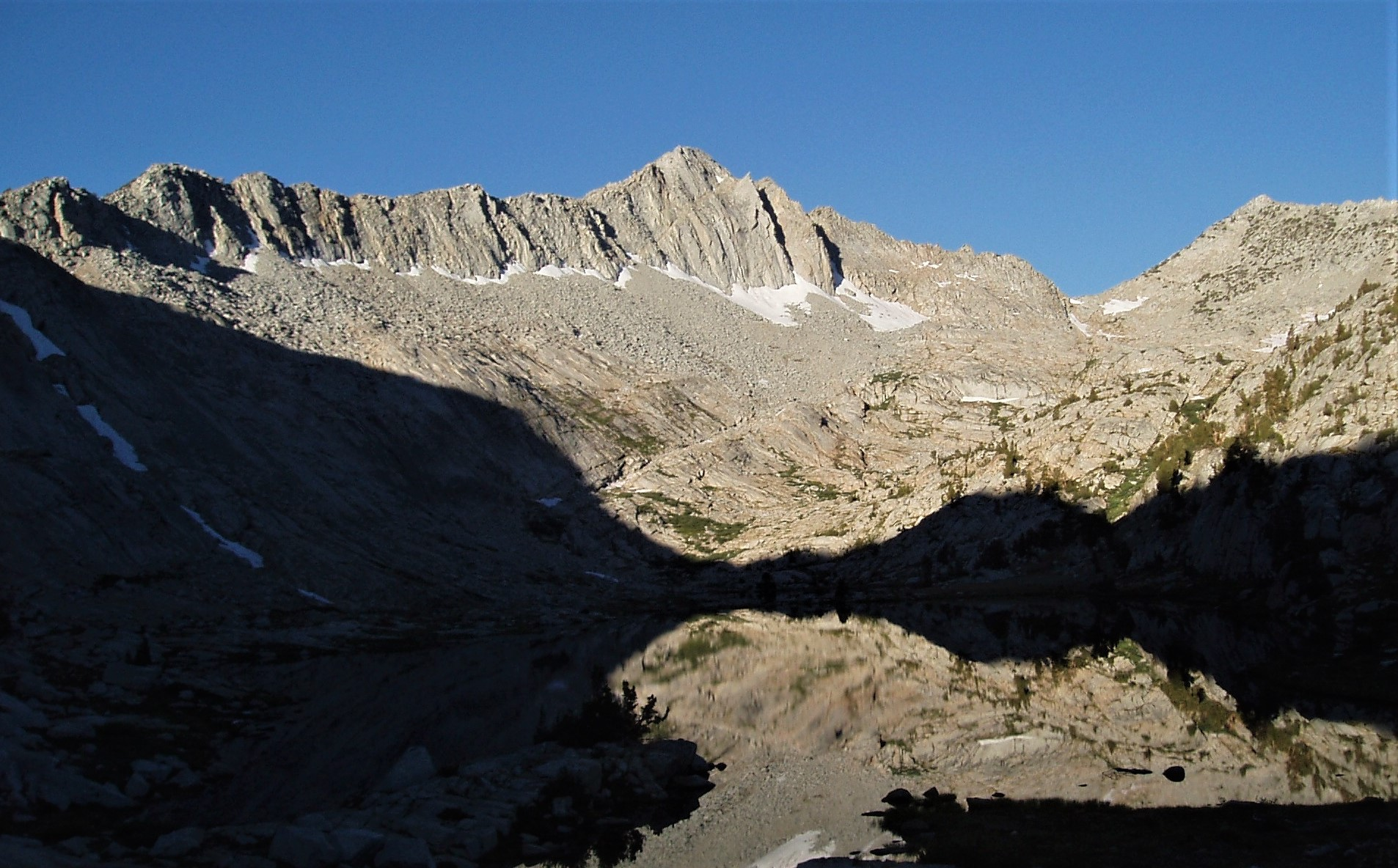
- Northeast aspect

Highest point
- Elevation: 12,207 ft (3,721 m)
- Prominence: 927 ft (283 m)
- Parent peak: Dougherty Peak (12,241 ft)
- Isolation: 3.89 mi (6.26 km)
- Listing: Sierra Peaks Section
- Coordinates: 36°52′10″N 118°34′27″W

Geography
- Location within California Location within the United States
- Location: Kings Canyon National Park; Fresno County, California, U.S.
- Parent range: Sierra Nevada
- Topo map: USGS The Sphinx

Geology
- Rock age: Cretaceous
- Mountain type: Fault block
- Rock type: granitic

Climbing
- First ascent: 1896
- Easiest route: class 2

Goat Mountain is a 12,207-foot-elevation (3,721-meter) mountain summit located in Kings Canyon National Park, in Fresno County of northern California, United States. It is situated on Monarch Divide which is west of the crest of the Sierra Nevada mountain range. Topographic relief is significant as the southeast aspect rises 5,600 feet (1,700 meters) above Paradise Valley in 2.5 miles. This feature was so named because mountain sheep, erroneously called goats, were once seen on the slopes. The name was already in use when the first ascent of the summit was made in 1896 by Joseph Nisbet LeConte and party. This mountain's name has been officially adopted by the United States Board on Geographic Names.

== Climate ==
According to the Köppen climate classification system, Goat Mountain is located in an alpine climate zone. Most weather fronts originate in the Pacific Ocean, and travel east toward the Sierra Nevada mountains. As fronts approach, they are forced upward by the peaks, causing them to drop their moisture in the form of rain or snowfall onto the range (orographic lift). Precipitation runoff from this mountain drains into tributaries of the South Fork Kings River.

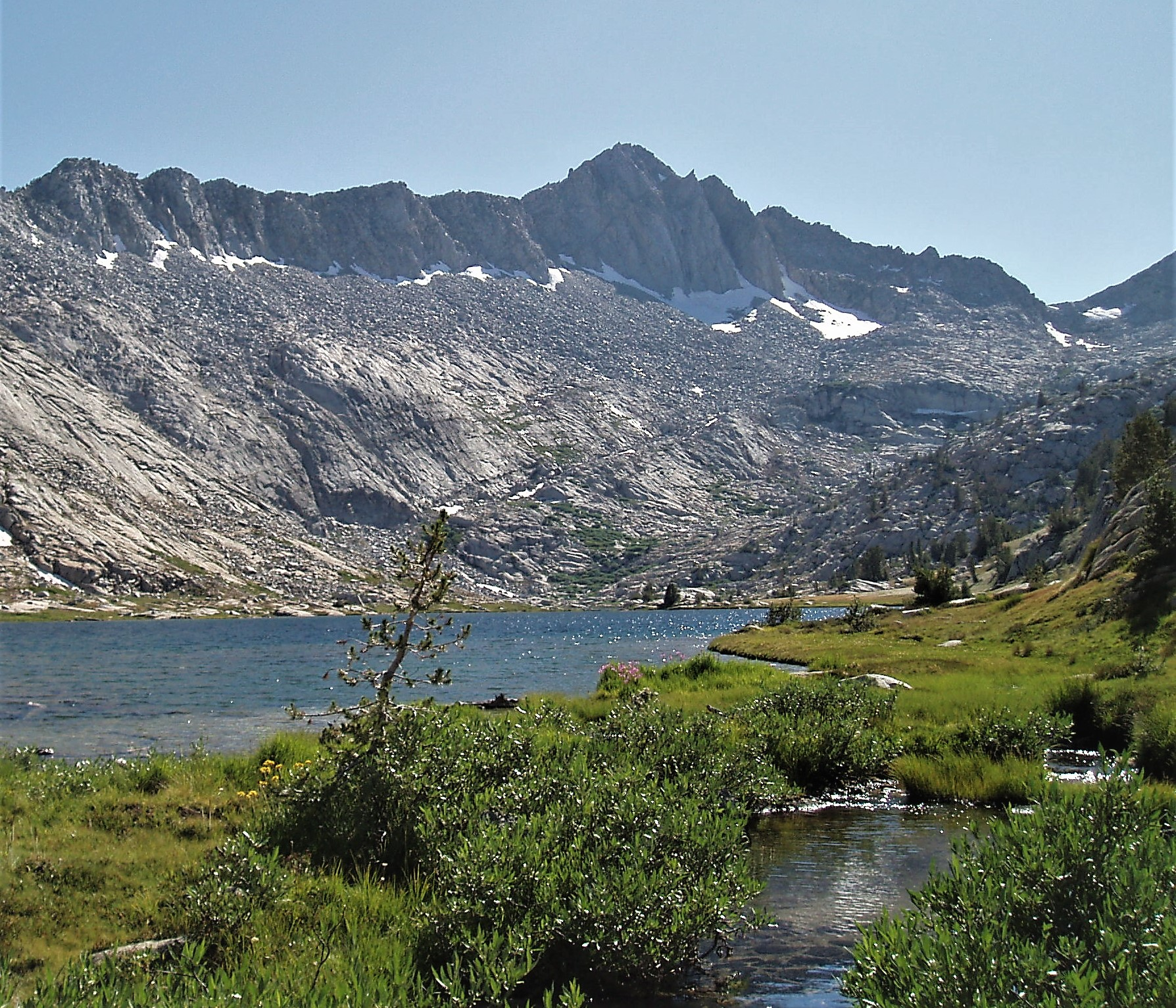
Goat Mountain from Lake 10620 (Kid Lakes)

== See also ==
- List of mountain peaks of California
