= Mount Ericsson =

Mountain in California, U.S.

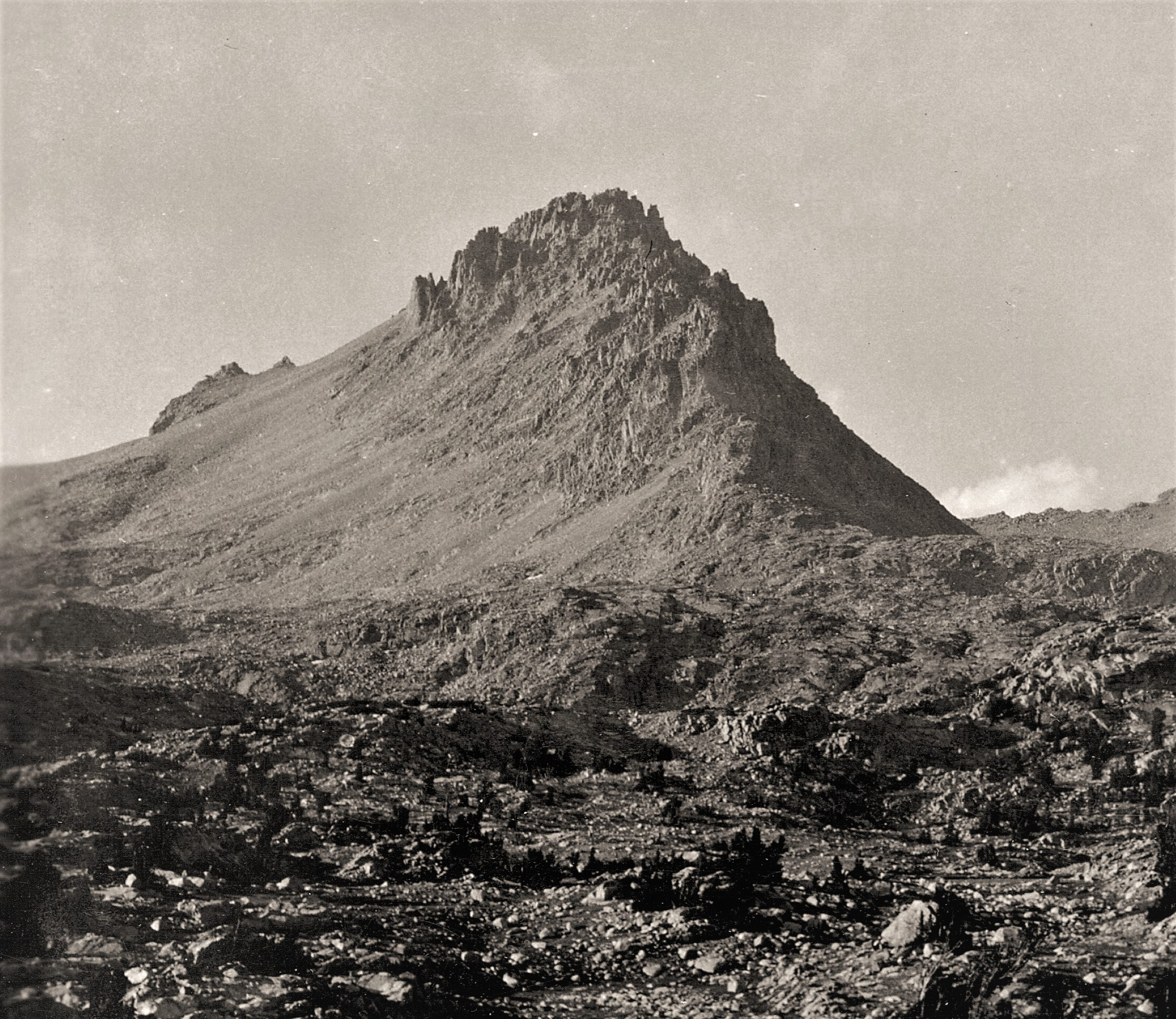
- South aspect in 1935

Highest point
- Elevation: 13,589 ft (4,142 m) NAVD 88
- Prominence: 919 ft (280 m)
- Listing: SPS Mountaineering peak; Western States Climbers Emblem peak
- Coordinates: 36°41′50″N 118°24′51″W

Geography
- Location within California Location within the United States
- Location: Tulare County, California, U.S.
- Parent range: Kings-Kern Divide in the Sierra Nevada
- Topo map: USGS Mount Brewer

Climbing
- First ascent: 1896 by Bolton and Lucy Brown
- Easiest route: West ridge, Scramble, class 2

Mount Ericsson is a 13,589-foot (4,142 m) summit on the Kings-Kern Divide, an offshoot of the Great Western Divide. It marks the boundary between Sequoia National Park and Kings Canyon National Park. Water falling on the north slopes flow into the Kings River by way of Bubbs Creek while the southern slopes form the headwaters of the Kern River.

The summit was first reached in 1896 by Bolton and Lucy Brown who climbed the easy west ridge from Lucy's Foot Pass, a class 2 col, west of the summit. They named it Crag Ericsson "in honor of Captn John Ericsson … in recognition of its extremely craggy character." John Ericsson was the engineer and inventor who designed and built the Monitor. The name was submitted to the U.S. Geographic Board by the National Park Service. The Board accepted the name Mount Ericsson in 1928. The name Ericsson Crags did appear on the 15 minute Mount Whitney map and the name Crag Ericsson appears on the Mount Ericsson GNIS page. as a variant name.

On the ridge that extends to the north from the main summit, there a number craggy sub-peaks known as the Ericsson Crags. Most of the climbing routes here are class 4 or better.

== See also ==
- Bolton Brown
