= Mount Cotter =

Mountain in the American state of California

- Location within California

Highest point
- Elevation: 12,719 ft (3,877 m) NAVD 88
- Prominence: 542 ft (165 m)
- Parent peak: Mount Clarence King
- Listing: Sierra Peaks Section
- Coordinates: 36°49′08″N 118°26′30″W

Naming
- Etymology: Richard D. Cotter

Geography
- Location: Kings Canyon National Park, Fresno County, California, U.S.
- Parent range: Sierra Nevada
- Topo map: USGS Mount Clarence King

Climbing
- First ascent: Southeast Slope 1922 by Bob Fitzsimons
- Easiest route: Southeast Slope, Scramble, class 2-3

Mount Cotter, located in the Kings Canyon National Park, is named for Dick Cotter who was a packer with the California Geological Survey in 1864. Cotter and Clarence King made the first ascent of Mount Tyndall. The Mountain has an elevation of 12,719 feet (3,877 m).

The mountain is easily climbed from Gardiner Basin with a class 2-3 slope. There are more difficult routes found on the north and east sides of Mount Cotter. The mountain features a large class 4-5 summit block. Mount Cotter can be reached from the west or east side of the Sierra Nevada.

Wilderness permits are required for overnight stays entering from either the east or west. There is a Visitors Center in Grant Grove that can inform visitors of when the office at Road's End will be open.

Camping is allowed in many places along the approach to Mt Cotter. Kearsarge Lakes, Charlotte Lake, and Rae Lakes all have a maximum 2 nights stay, and Bullfrog Lake along the Kearsarge Pass Trail is closed to camping. Bear canisters are required for overnight stays.

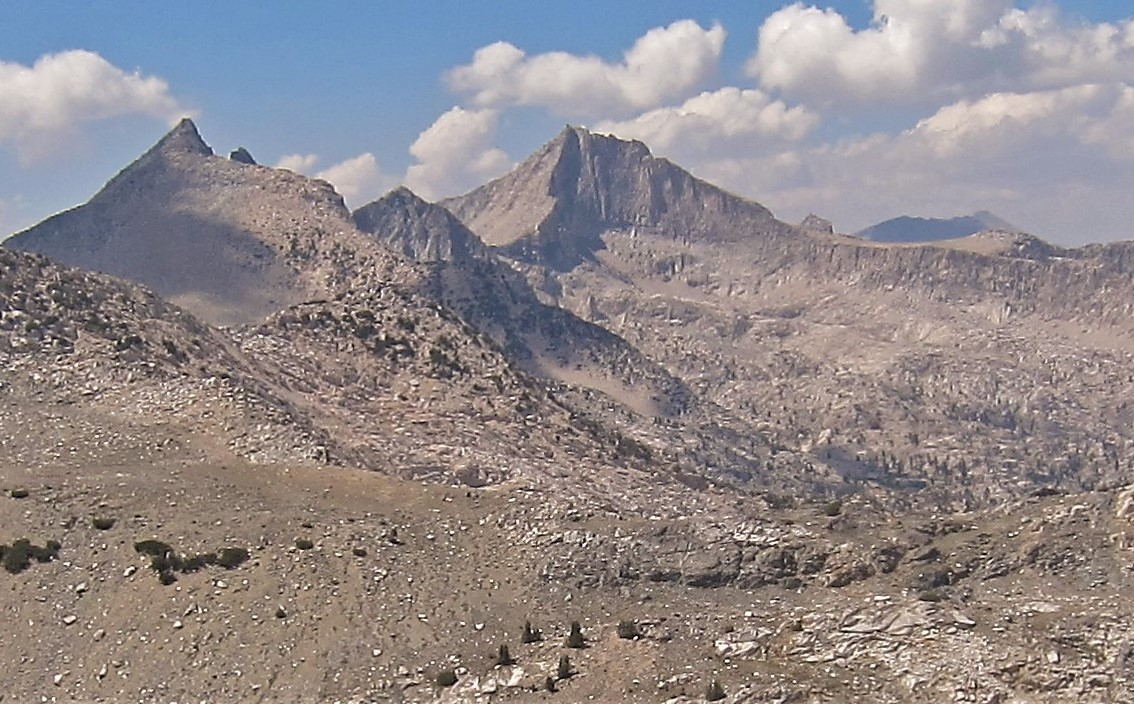
Mt. Cotter (left) with Mt. Clarence King (centered), from Glen Pass
