= Mount Gardiner (California) =

Mountain in the American state of California

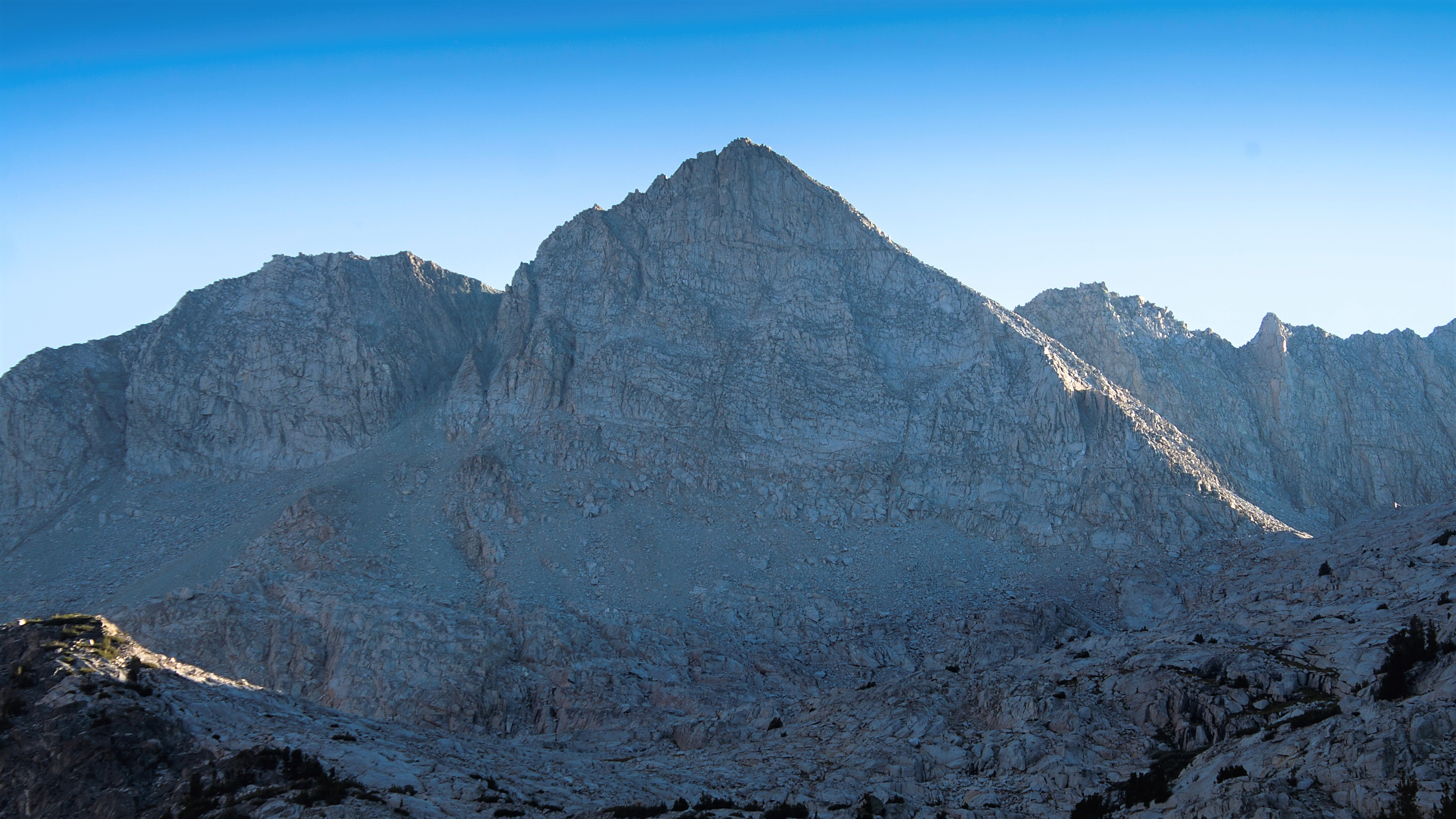

Highest point
- Elevation: 12,907 ft (3,934 m)
- Prominence: 932 ft (284 m)
- Parent peak: Diamond Peak
- Isolation: 3.96 mi (6.37 km)
- Listing: SPS Mountaineers Peak
- Coordinates: 36°48′22″N 118°27′33″W

Naming
- Etymology: James Terry Gardiner

Geography
- Location within California
- Parent range: Sierra Nevada

Mount Gardiner is a 12,907-foot (3,934 m) summit of the Sierra Nevada in Fresno County, California in the United States, situated in the eastern part of Kings Canyon National Park. Some maps label this peak as Mount Gardner.

== See also ==
- List of mountain peaks of California

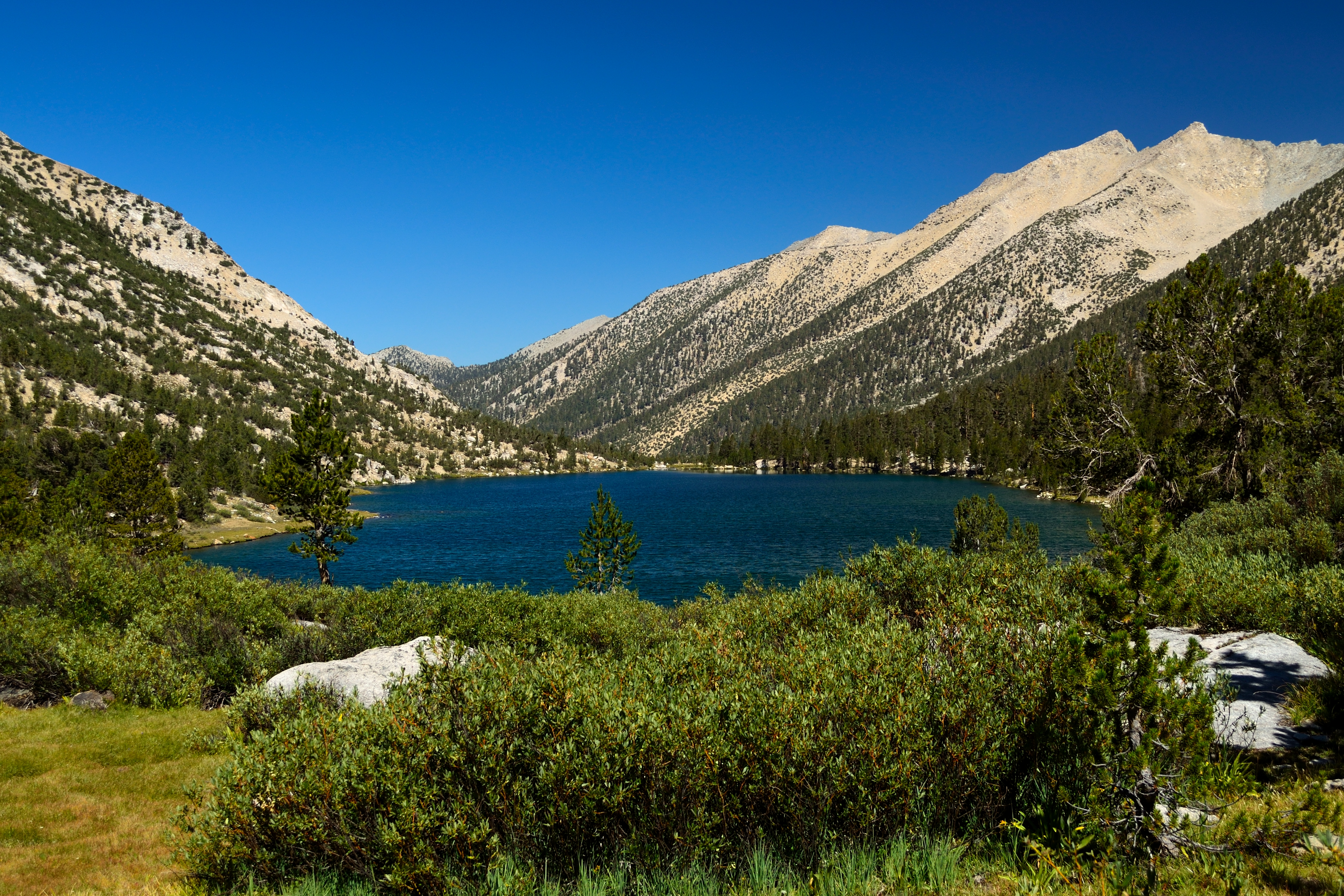
Charlotte Lake and southeast aspect of Mt. Gardiner (right)

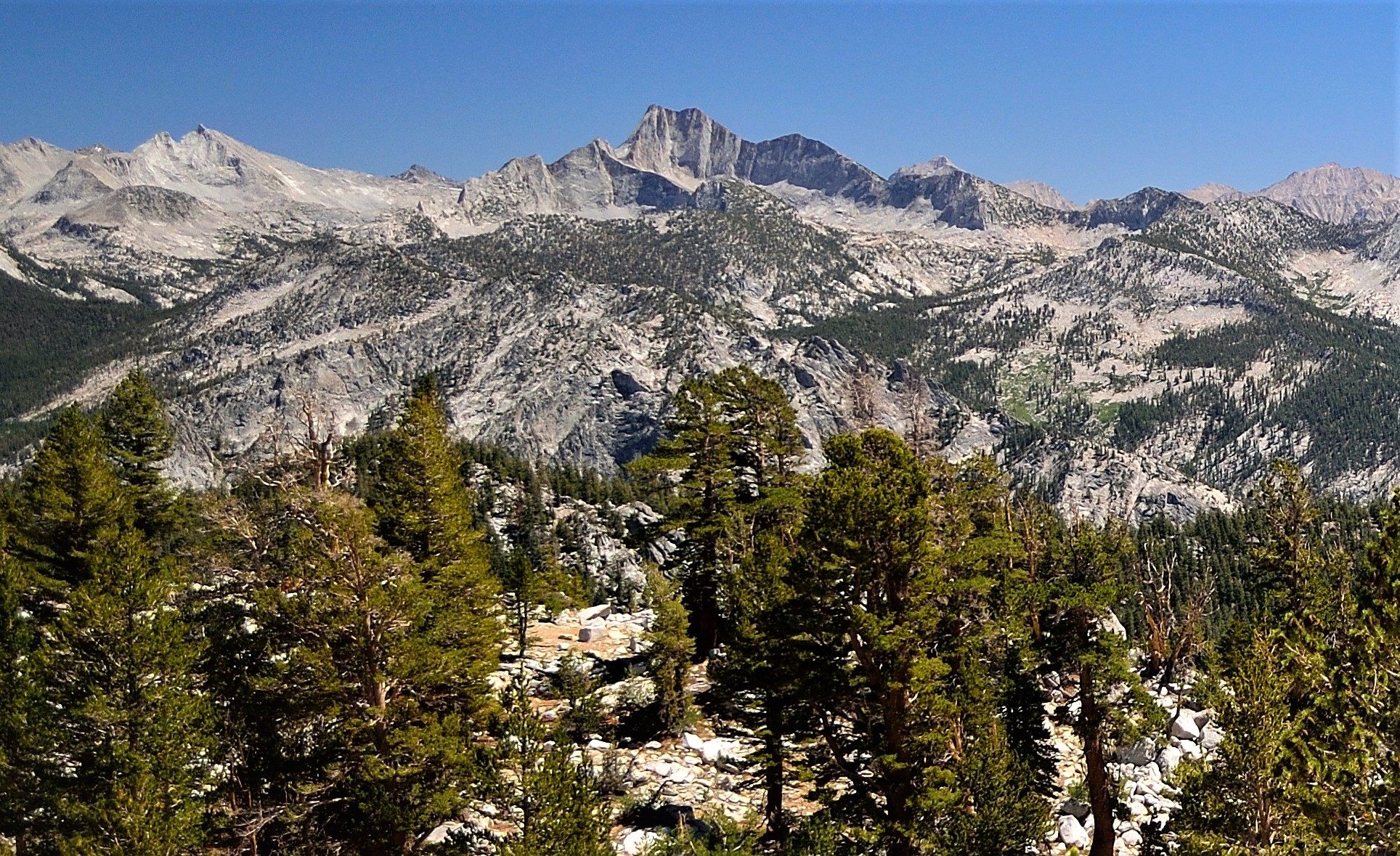
Mt. Gardiner from WNW
