= Thunder Mountain (Tulare County, California) =

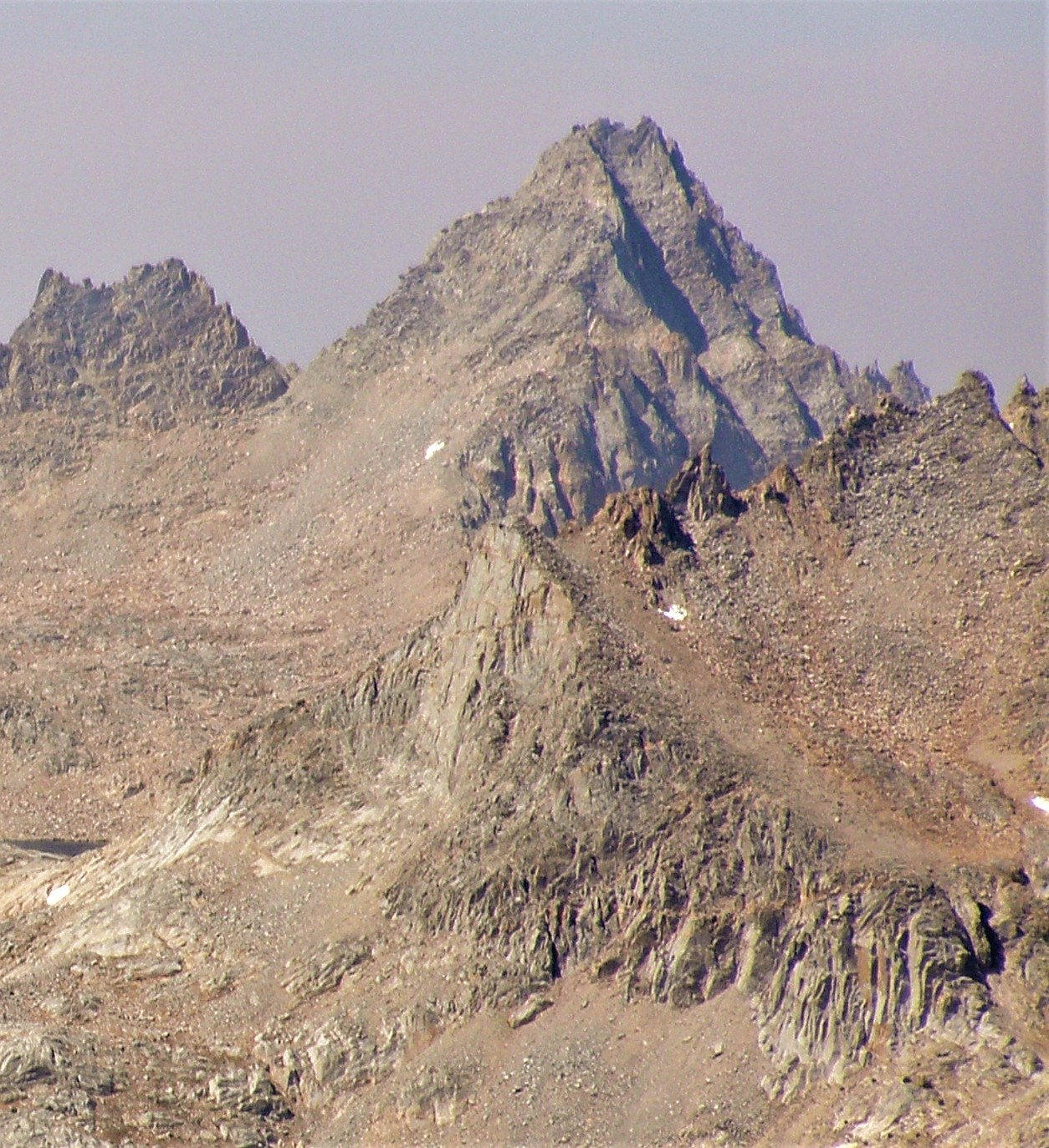
- East aspect, from Mt. Tyndall

Highest point
- Elevation: 13,523+ ft (4,122+ m) NAVD 88
- Prominence: 525 ft (160 m)
- Listing: SPS Mountaineers Peak; Western States Climbers Star peak
- Coordinates: 36°40′08″N 118°28′33″W

Geography
- Location within California
- Location: Tulare County California, U.S.
- Parent range: Great Western Divide, Sierra Nevada
- Topo map: USGS Mount Brewer

Climbing
- First ascent: 1905 by George Davis
- Easiest route: Climb, class 3–4

Thunder Mountain is located in the northern part of the Great Western Divide, a sub-range of the Sierra Nevada in California. The summit marks a point on the boundary between Sequoia and Kings Canyon national parks and is 0.6 miles (1 km) north of Table Mountain and south 2.8 miles (4.5 km) Mount Brewer. Thunder pass, on the mountains east side, has an elevation of 12,720+ feet (3 877+ m). This pass marks the western end of the Kings-Kern Divide.

The mountain was named by George R. Davis, a topographer with the United States Geological Survey. He made the first ascent, in August 1905, to establish a benchmark on the summit. The name appears on the Mt. Whitney, USGS 30 minute topographic map of 1905, and was officially recognized by the Board on Geographic Names in 1928.
