= Pilot Knob (Fresno County, California) =

Mountain in the state of California

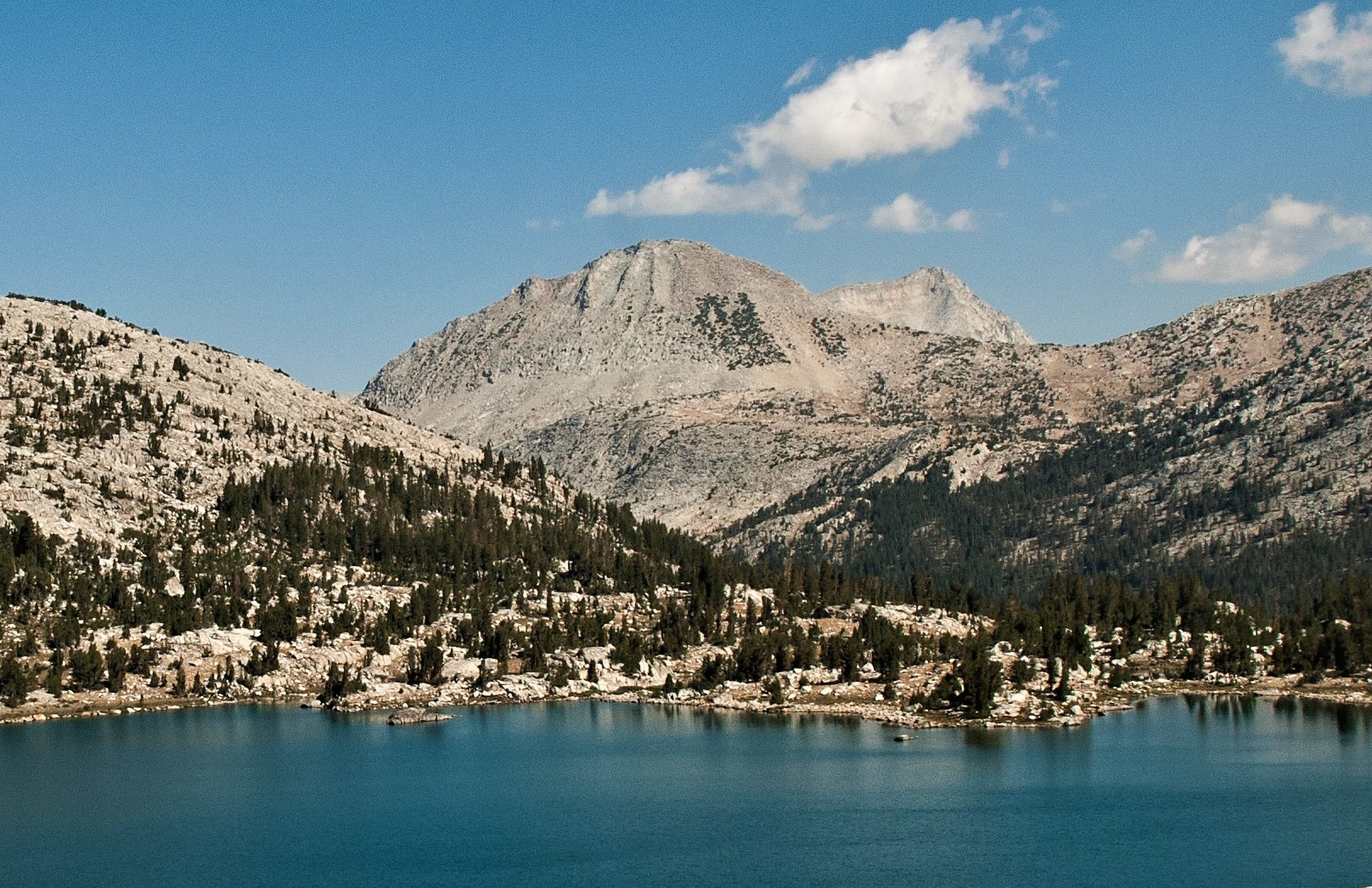
- Southeast aspect, from Packsaddle Lake

Highest point
- Elevation: 12,245 ft (3,732 m)
- Prominence: 645 ft (197 m)
- Parent peak: Mount Morrow (12,402 ft)
- Isolation: 2.50 mi (4.02 km)
- Listing: Sierra Peaks Section
- Coordinates: 37°16′24″N 118°45′26″W

Geography
- Location within California Location within the United States
- Location: Fresno County, California, U.S.
- Parent range: Sierra Nevada
- Topo map: USGS Mount Hilgard

Geology
- Rock age: Cretaceous
- Mountain type: Fault block
- Rock type: Granodiorite

Climbing
- First ascent: Unknown
- Easiest route: class 2 East slope

Pilot Knob is a 12,245-foot-elevation (3,732-meter) mountain summit located in Fresno County in the Sierra Nevada mountain range in northern California, United States. It is situated at the intersection of Piute Canyon and French Canyon, in the John Muir Wilderness, on land managed by the Sierra National Forest. It is set 2.5 miles (4.0 km) south of Merriam Peak and three miles north of the Matthes Glaciers. Pilot Knob is the 360th-highest peak in California, and itstopographic relief is significant as the west aspect rises 2,800 feet (850 meters) above Hutchinson Meadow in approximately one mile. This mountain was likely named by the USGS during the 1907–09 survey for the Mt. Goddard Quadrangle, and the toponym has been officially adopted by the U.S. Board on Geographic Names.

== Climate ==
According to the Köppen climate classification system, Pilot Knob is located in an alpine climate zone. Most weather fronts originate in the Pacific Ocean, and travel east toward the Sierra Nevada mountains. As fronts approach, they are forced upward by the peaks (orographic lift), causing them to drop their moisture in the form of rain or snowfall onto the range. Precipitation runoff from this mountain drains into Piute Creek which is a tributary of the South Fork San Joaquin River.

== Gallery ==
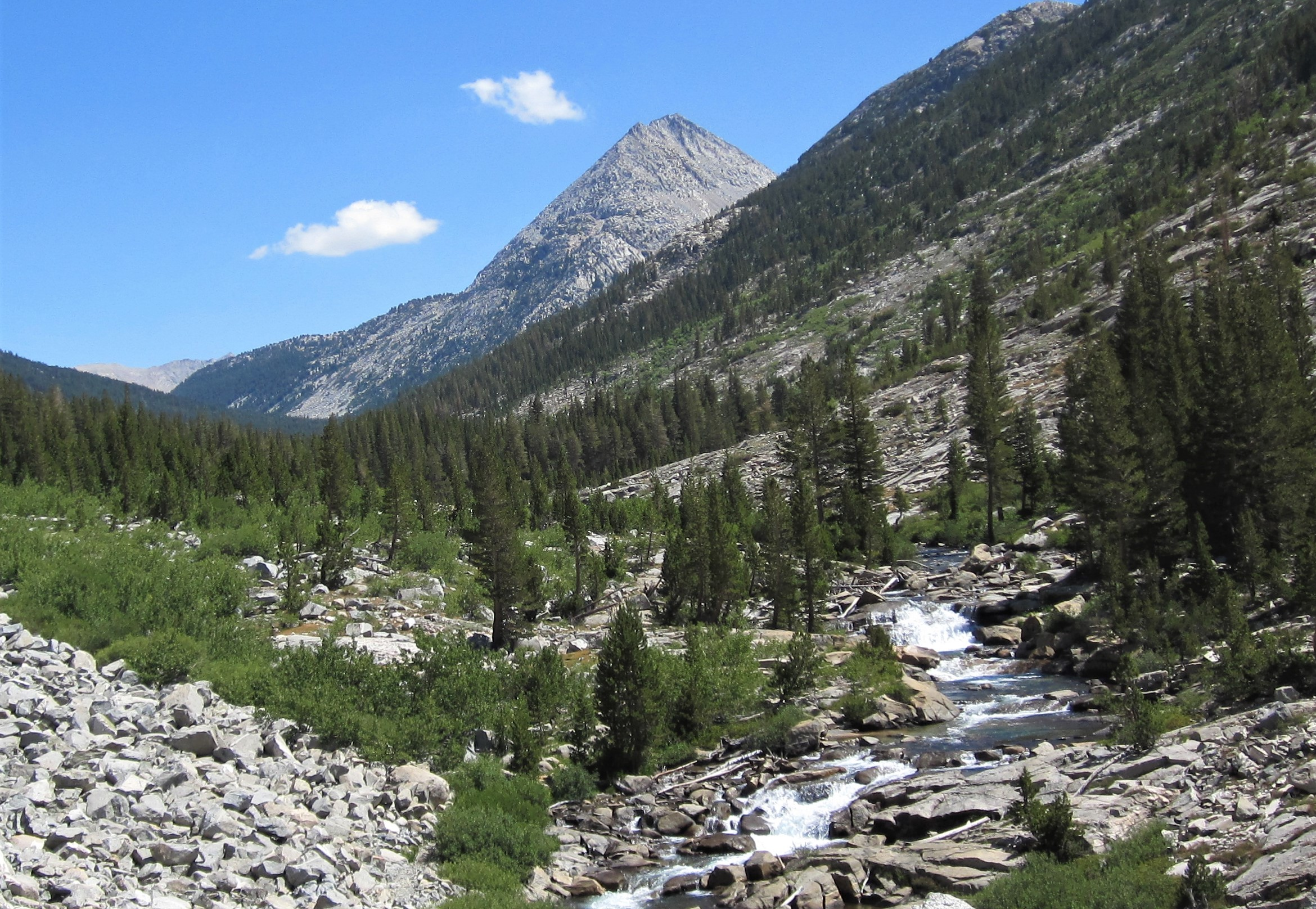
West aspect of Pilot Knob, with Piute Creek.

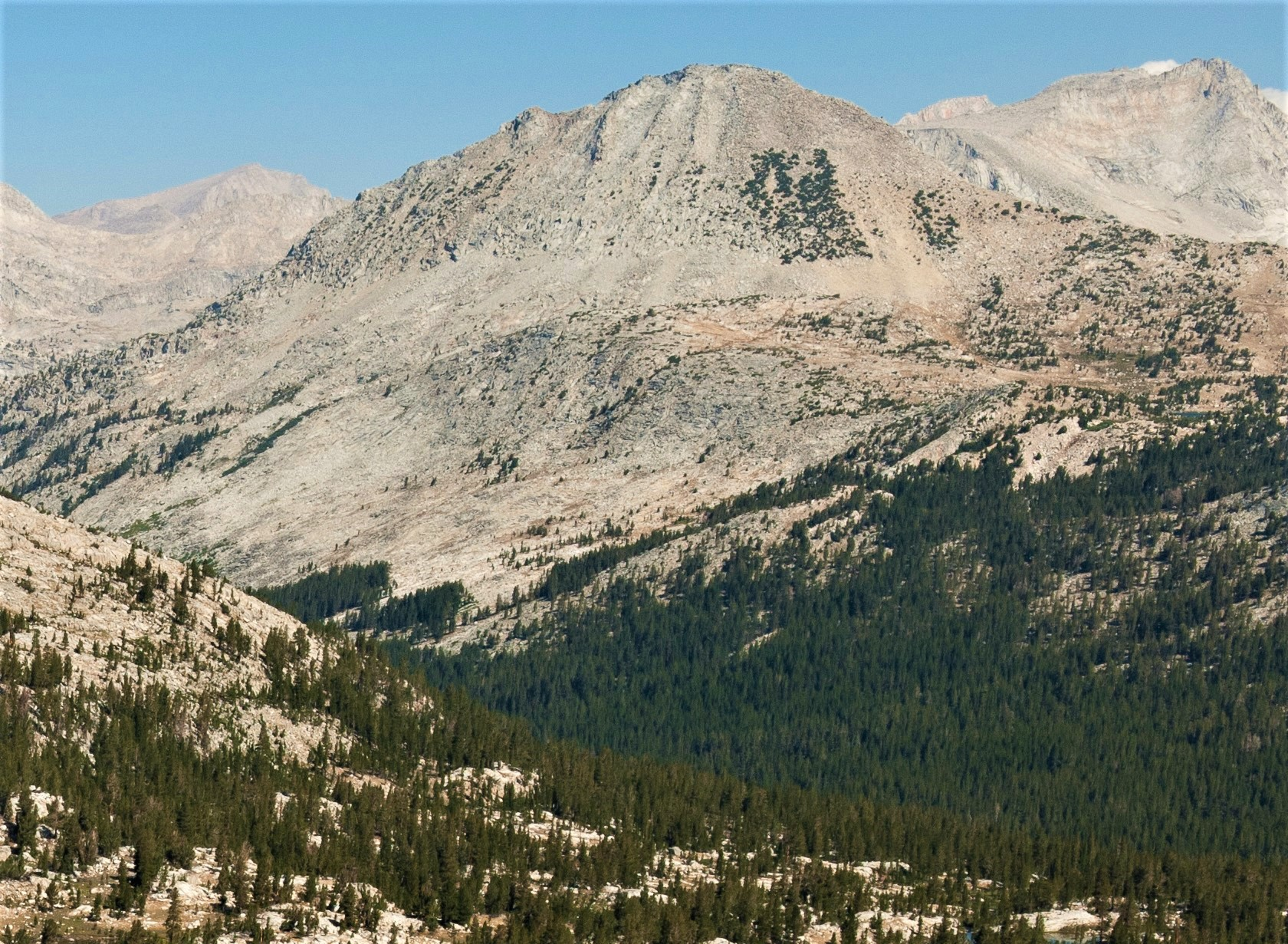
Southeast aspect of Pilot Knob.
The top of Merriam Peak in upper right corner.

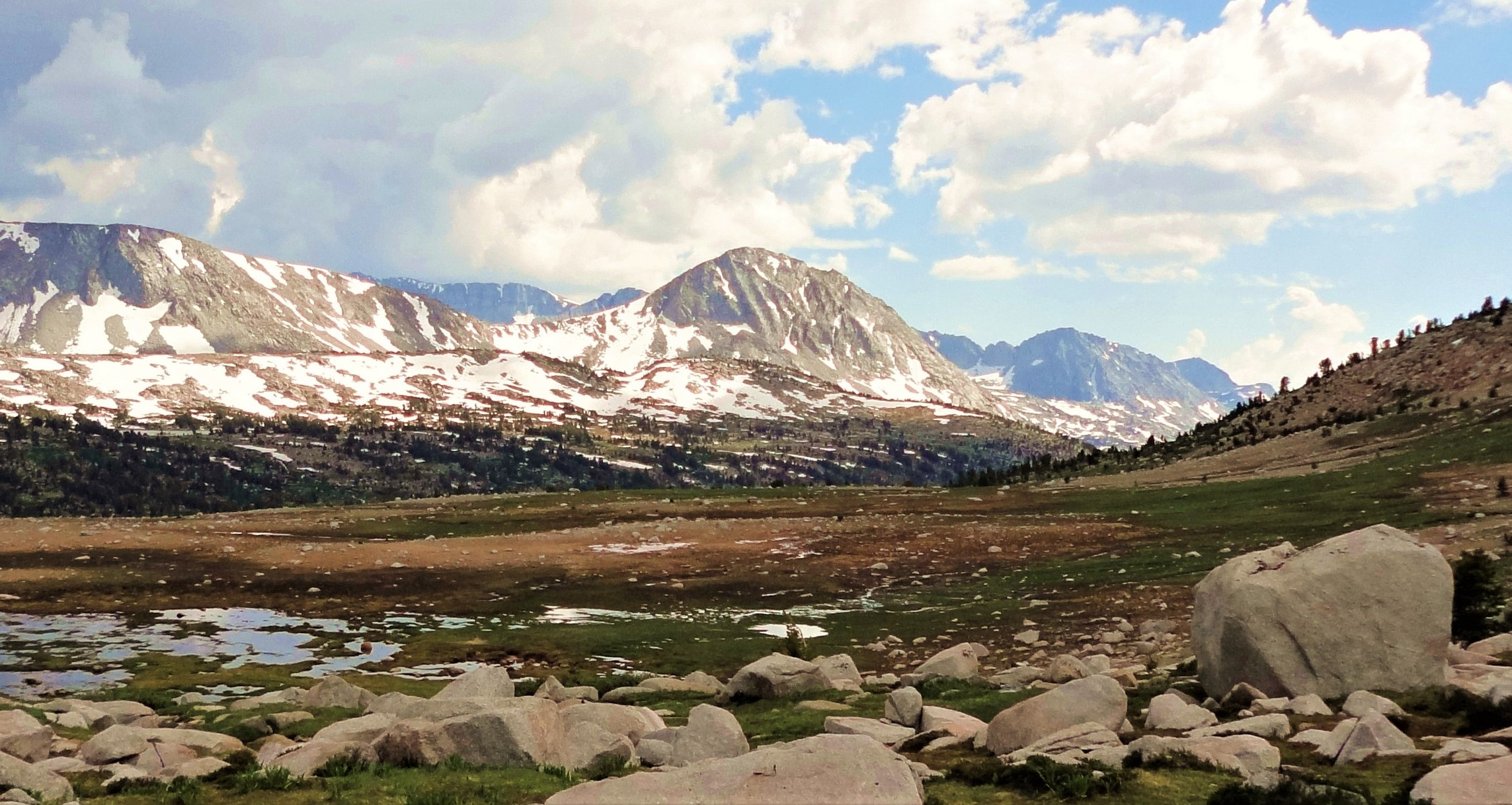
Northeast aspect

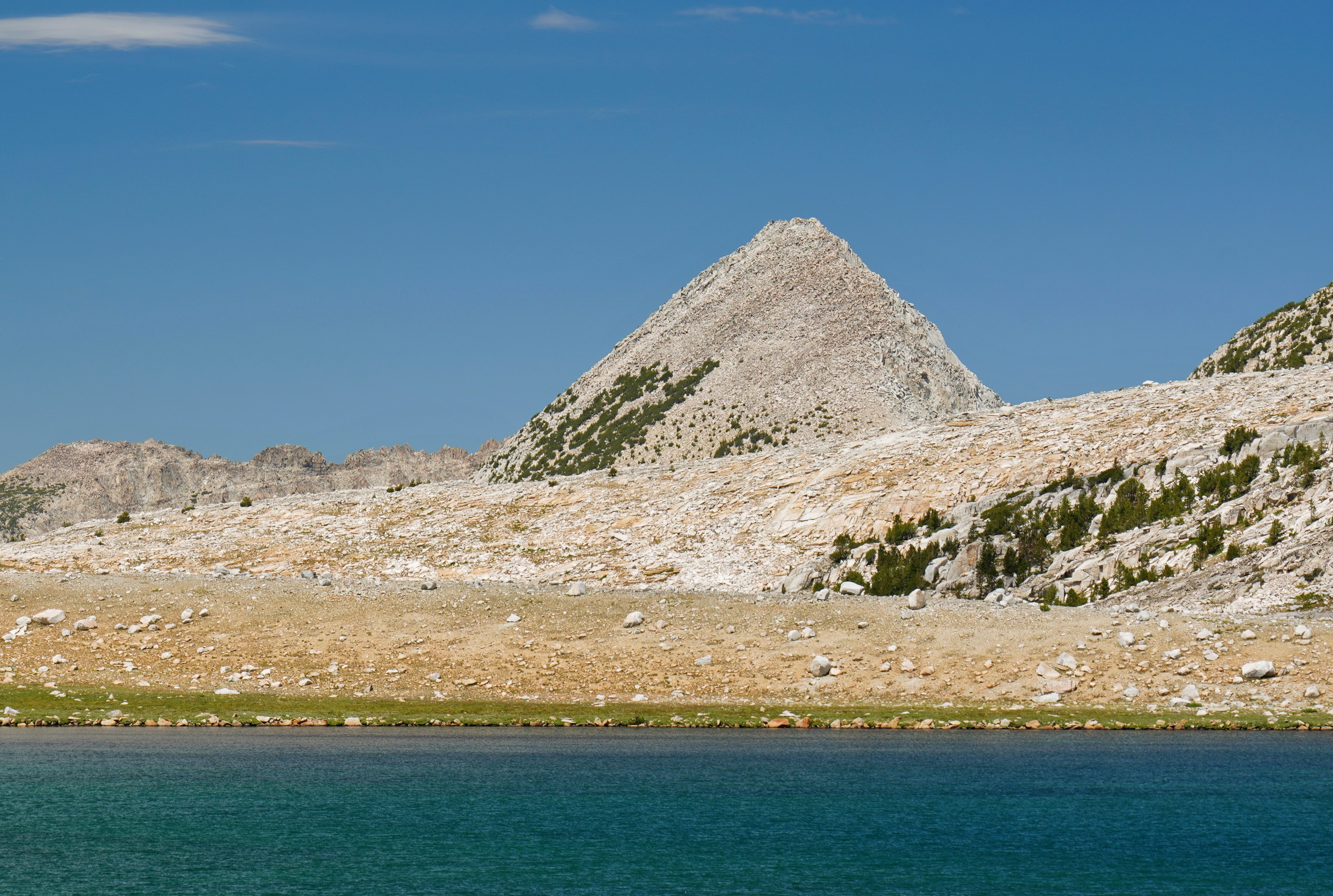
East aspect viewed from Desolation Lake

== See also ==
- List of mountain peaks of California
