= Mount Gardner (disambiguation) =

Mount Gardner is a mountain that is part of the Sentinel Range, in the Ellsworth Mountains of Antarctica Antarctica.

Mount Gardner may also refer to:

- Mount Gardner (Bowen Island), on Bowen Island in British Columbia, Canada
- Mount Gardner (Western Australia), in Two Peoples Bay Nature Reserve, Western Australia

== See also ==
- Mount Gardiner (disambiguation)
