= Mount Starr King (New Hampshire) =

Mountain in New Hampshire, United States

Highest point
- Elevation: 1,191 m (3,907 ft)
- Prominence: 50 m (160 ft)
- Coordinates: 44°26.08′N 71°25.98′W

Geography
- Location: Coös County, New Hampshire, U.S.
- Parent range: Pliny Range
- Topo map: USGS Pliny Range (NH)

Mount Starr King is a mountain located in Coos County, New Hampshire. The mountain is named after Thomas Starr King (1824–1864), and is part of the Pliny Range of the White Mountains. Mt. Starr King is flanked to the east by Mount Waumbek, and to the northwest by Haystack Mountain. Starr King is drained by various brooks into the Israel River, and thence into the Connecticut River and Long Island Sound.

The Willard Basin Ski Area development was proposed and surveyed for the northern slope of Mount Starr King in the mid-1960s. An aerial tramway ski lift and hotel were planned to be constructed on the summit of the peak.

== See also ==
- List of mountains in New Hampshire
- White Mountain National Forest
- Mount Starr King in California
