= Whaleback (California) =

Remote Ridge

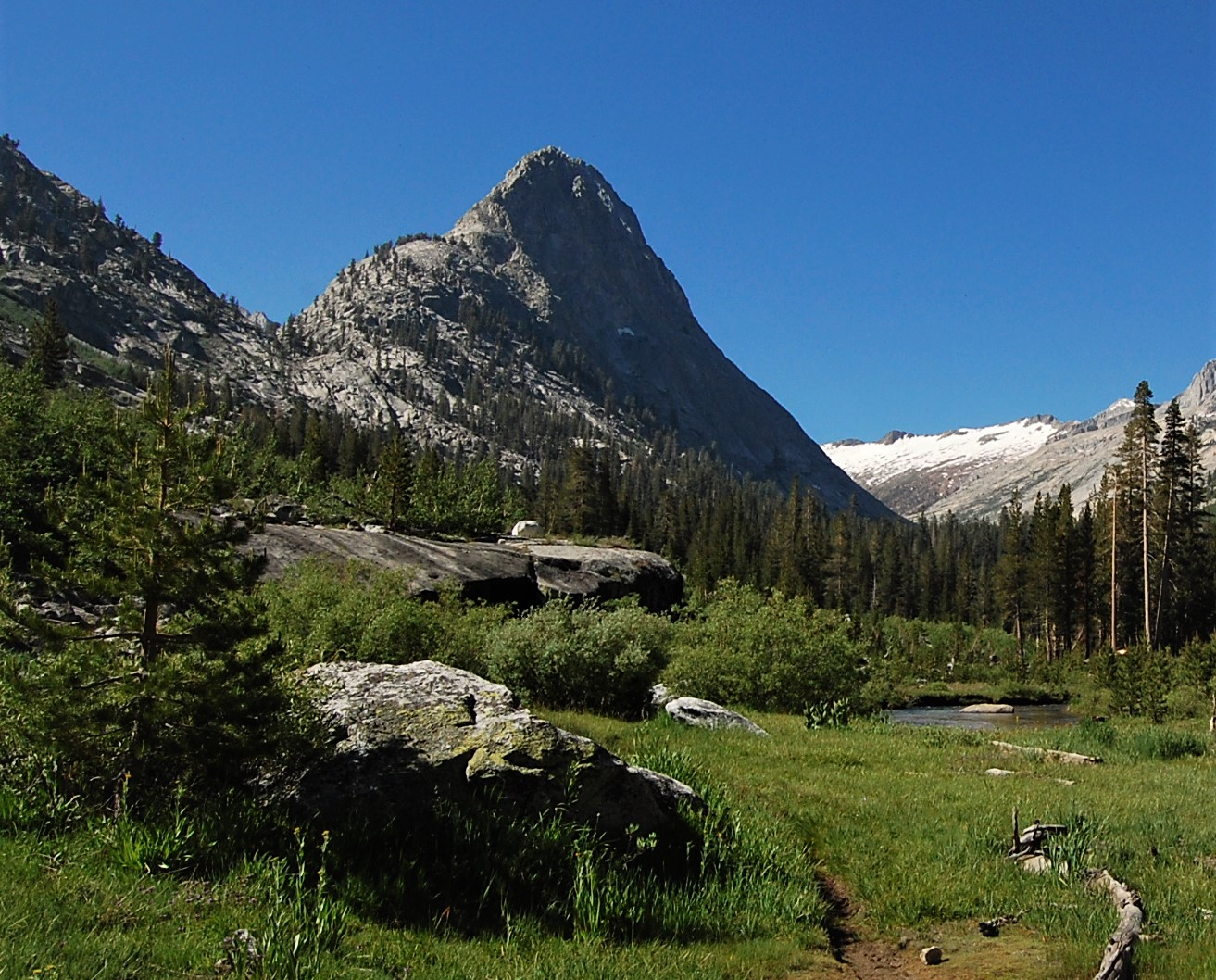
- North aspect, from Big Wet Meadow

Highest point
- Elevation: 11,717 ft (3,571 m)
- Prominence: 557 ft (170 m)
- Parent peak: Peak 12660
- Isolation: 1.66 mi (2.67 km)
- Listing: Sierra Peaks Section
- Coordinates: 36°37′49″N 118°31′52″W

Naming
- Etymology: Whaleback

Geography
- Location within California Location within the United States
- Location: Kings Canyon National Park; Tulare County, California, U.S.
- Parent range: Sierra Nevada; Great Western Divide
- Topo map: USGS Sphinx Lakes

Geology
- Rock type: granitic

Climbing
- First ascent: 1936, Adele van Loben Sels, May Pridham
- Easiest route: class 3

Whaleback is a remote 11,717-foot-elevation (3,571-meter) three-mile-long ridge located in the Sierra Nevada mountain range, in Tulare County of northern California. It is situated in Kings Canyon National Park, extending north from the Great Western Divide. This geographical feature has significant topographic relief as it rises 2,900 feet (880 meters) above Shortys Cabin in Cloud Canyon in approximately one mile. Whaleback ranks as the 488th highest peak in California. The first ascent of the summit was made August 5, 1936, by May Pridham and Adele van Loben Sels.

== Climate ==
According to the Köppen climate classification system, Whaleback is located in an alpine climate zone. Most weather fronts originate in the Pacific Ocean, and travel east toward the Sierra Nevada mountains. As fronts approach, they are forced upward by the peaks, causing them to drop their moisture in the form of rain or snowfall onto the range (orographic lift). Precipitation runoff from the mountain drains into headwaters of the Roaring River.

== See also ==
- List of mountain peaks of California
