= Mount Starr King (California) =

Granite dome in Yosemite National Park, USA

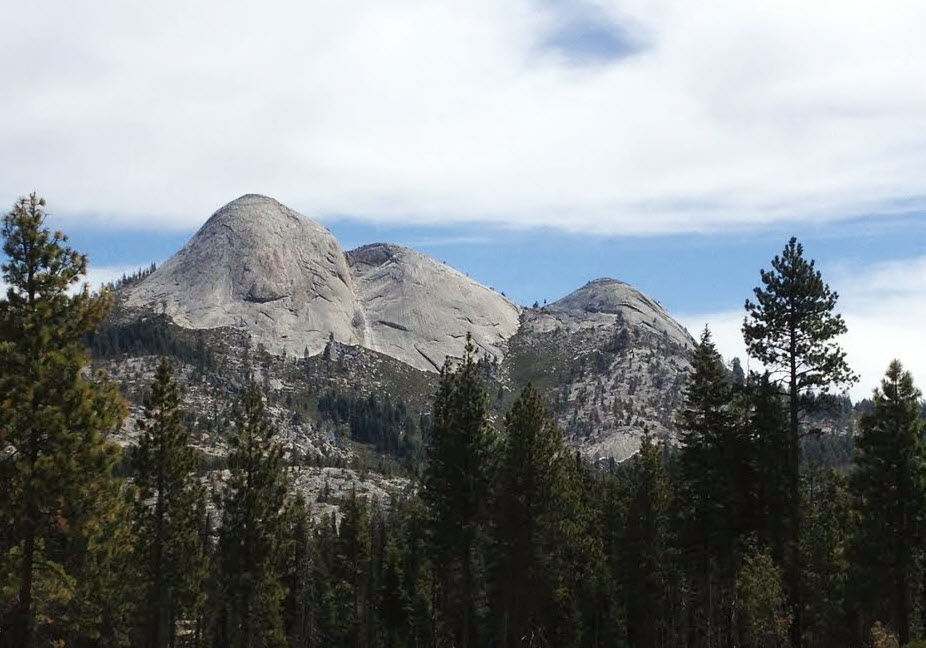
- Mount Starr King's west face.

Highest point
- Elevation: 9,096 ft (2,772 m) NAVD 88
- Prominence: 1,012 ft (308 m)
- Parent peak: Mount Clark
- Listing: SPS Mountaineers peak
- Coordinates: 37°42′10″N 119°31′04″W

Geography
- Location within California Location within the United States
- Location: Yosemite National Park, Mariposa County, California, U.S.
- Parent range: Sierra Nevada
- Topo map: USGS Half Dome

Climbing
- First ascent: August 1876 by George Bailey and E. S. Schuyler via Northeast Side, class 5.2
- Easiest route: Rock climb, class 5

Mount Starr King is a symmetrical granite dome in Yosemite National Park, whose highest point is 9,096 feet (2,772 m) above sea level.

Climbing Starr King's dome requires technical skills or equipment, and the easiest routes are rated low class 5 in the Yosemite Decimal System.

It was named for Thomas Starr King, a Unitarian preacher and political activist. It has historically been known by various names including Kings Peak, See-wah-lam, South Dome, and Tis-sa-ack.

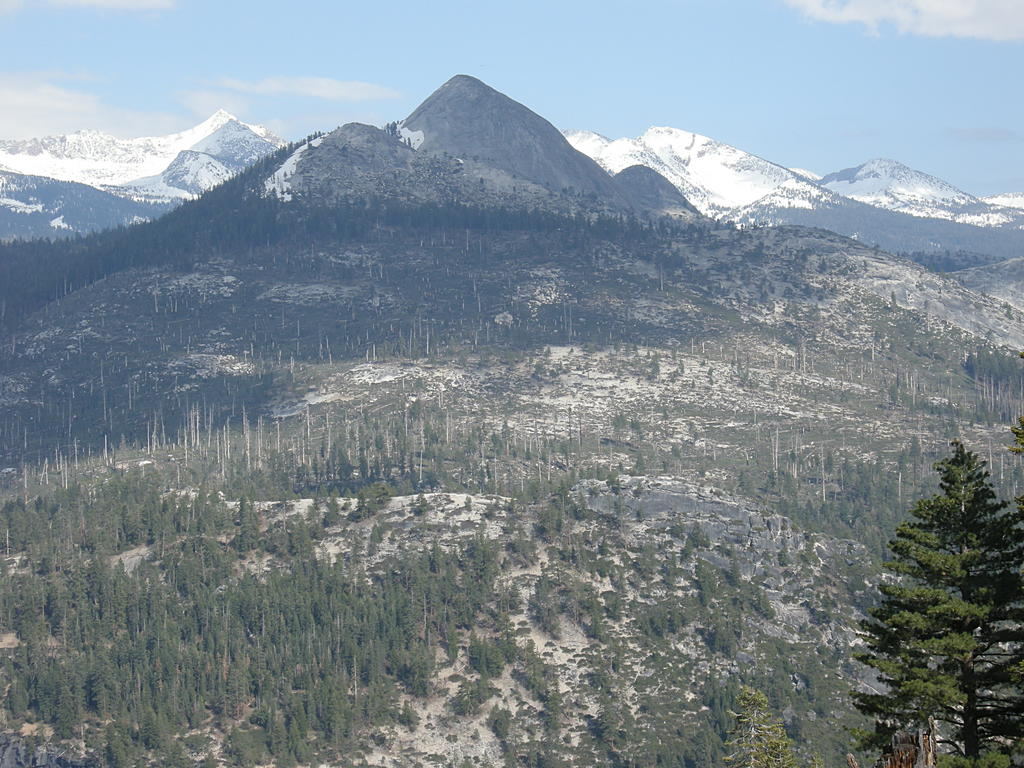
Mount Starr King

== See also ==
- Mount Starr King, a New Hampshire mountain named for Starr King
