= Tunemah Peak =

Mountain in Fresno County, California, U.S.

Highest point
- Elevation: 11,158 feet (3,401 m)
- Coordinates: 37°0′N 118°40′W

Naming
- Etymology: "屌你阿媽" (Jyutping: diu^{2} nei^{5} aa^{3} maa^{1}; lit. 'fuck your mother')

Geography
- Country: United States
- State: California
- Region: Fresno County

Tunemah Peak is a mountain in Fresno County, California, located in the southwestern United States, with an elevation of 11,158 feet. The mountain gets its name from the nearby Tunemah Trail, which originated in 1878 when a Cantonese cook and a shepherd uttered the Cantonese curse "屌你阿媽" (Jyutping: diu^{2} nei^{5} aa^{3} maa^{1}; Cantonese Yale: díu néih a mā; lit. 'fuck your mother') while walking along the rugged trail.
