= Diamond Peak (California) =

Mountain in the Sierra Nevada

- Location within California

Highest point
- Elevation: 13,133 ft (4,003 m) NAVD 88
- Prominence: 857 ft (261 m)
- Listing: Sierra Peaks Section; Vagmarken Club Sierra Crest List
- Coordinates: 36°49′35″N 118°23′25″W

Geography
- Location: Kings Canyon National Park; John Muir Wilderness Area; Fresno / Inyo counties, California, U.S.
- Topo map: USGS Mount Clarence King

Diamond Peak is a 13,133-foot (4,003 m) mountain in the Sierra Nevada on the boundary between Fresno and Inyo Counties, California in the United States. It is on the Sierra Crest. The west side of Diamond Peak is located in Kings Canyon National Park, at the headwater of Woods Creek, and the east side is located in the Inyo National Forest.

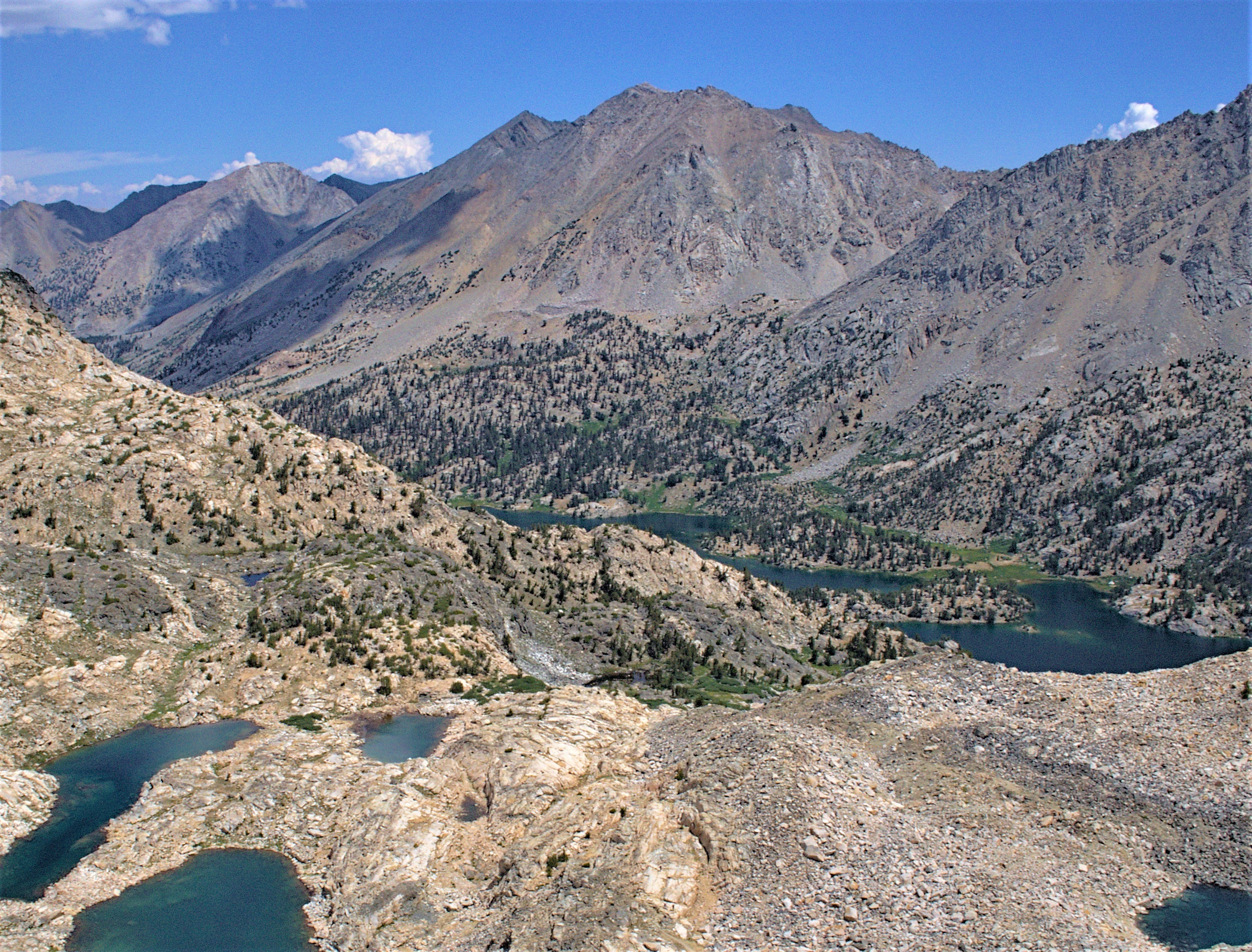
South-southwest aspect, from Glen Pass
