= Mount Harrington (California) =

Mountain in California, United States

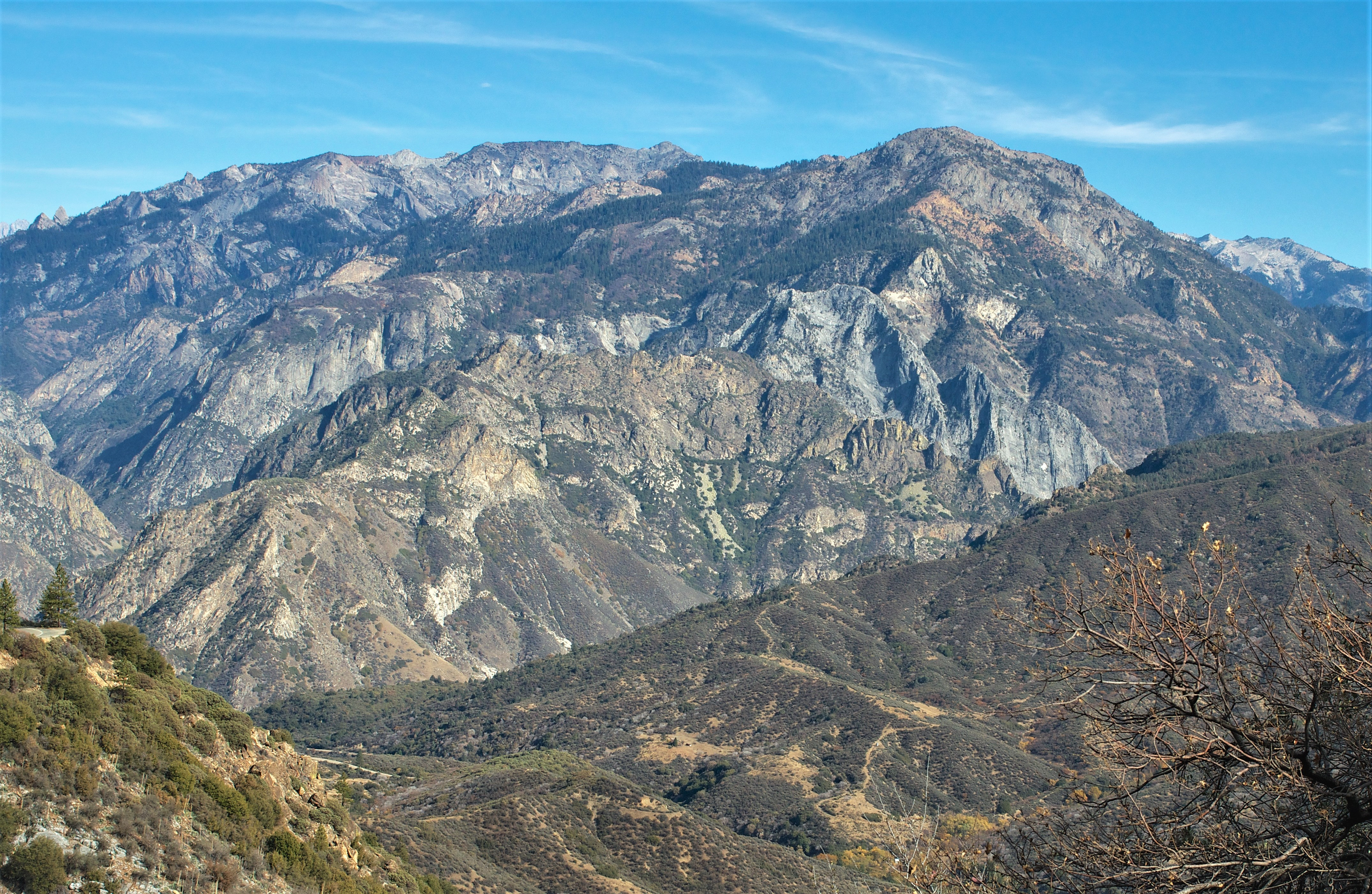
- Harrington's summit centered in back, from WSW (Wren Peak on right)

Highest point
- Elevation: 11,009 ft (3,356 m)
- Prominence: 329 ft (100 m)
- Parent peak: Despair Benchmark (11,081 ft)
- Isolation: 0.67 mi (1.08 km)
- Listing: Sierra Peaks Section
- Coordinates: 36°52′12″N 118°44′01″W

Geography
- Location within California Location within the United States
- Location: Fresno County, California, U.S.
- Parent range: Sierra Nevada
- Topo map: USGS Cedar Grove

Geology
- Rock type: granitic

Climbing
- First ascent: 1951
- Easiest route: class 3 North ridge

Mount Harrington is an 11,009-foot-elevation (3,356-meter) mountain summit located in Fresno County of northern California, United States. It is situated on Monarch Divide which is west of the crest of the Sierra Nevada mountain range, in the Monarch Wilderness, on the shared boundary of Sequoia National Forest with Sierra National Forest. The first ascent of the summit was made July 27, 1951, by David Hammack and Anton Nelson.

== Climate ==
According to the Köppen climate classification system, Mount Harrington is located in an alpine climate zone. Most weather fronts originate in the Pacific Ocean, and travel east toward the Sierra Nevada mountains. As fronts approach, they are forced upward by the peaks, causing them to drop their moisture in the form of rain or snowfall onto the range (orographic lift). Precipitation runoff from this mountain drains into tributaries of the Kings River.

== See also ==
- List of mountain peaks of California
