= Bear Creek Spire =

Mountain in California, United States

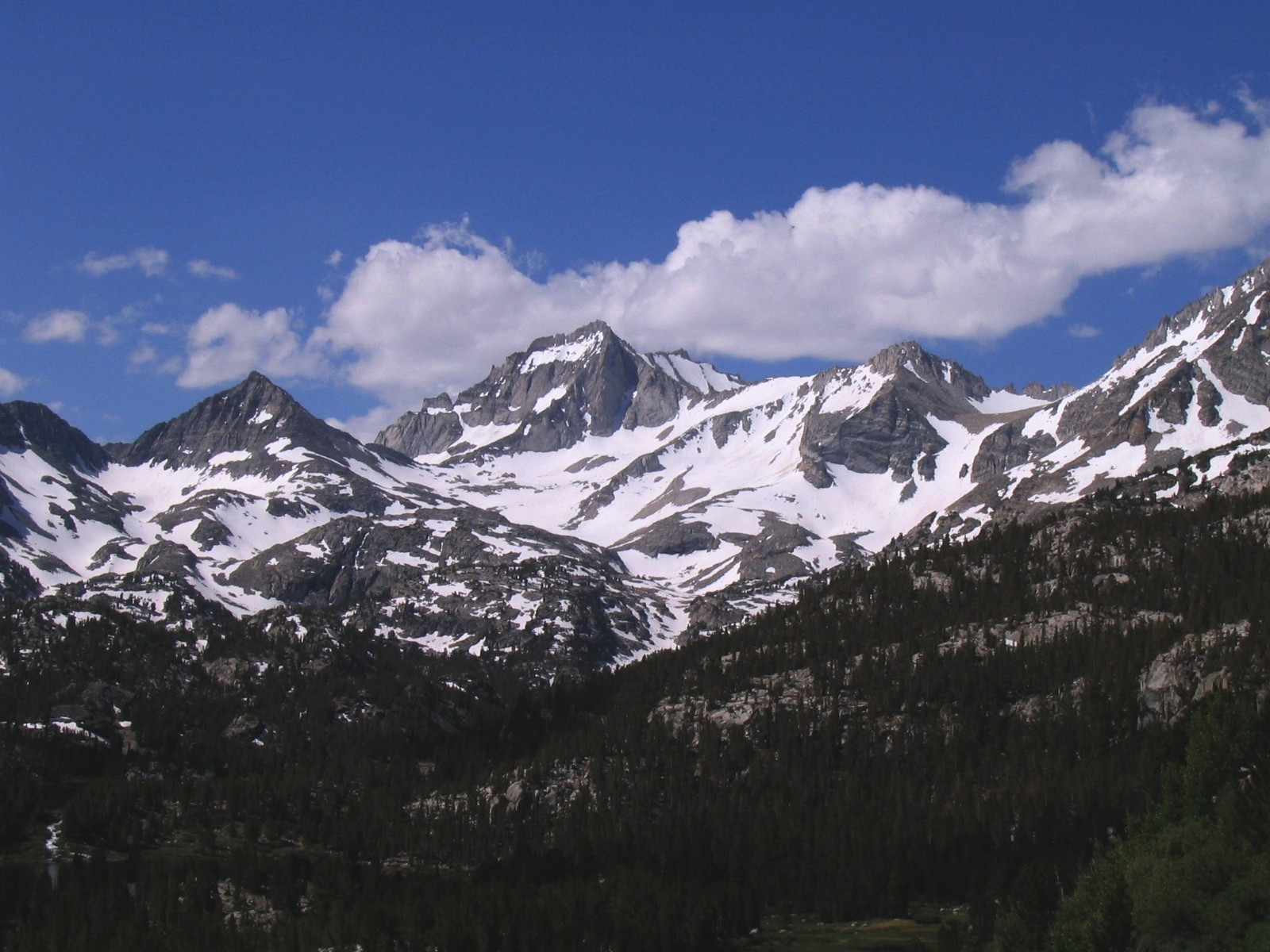
- Bear Creek Spire

Highest point
- Elevation: 13,726 ft (4,184 m)
- Prominence: 1,440 ft (440 m)
- Listing: Mountains of California
- Coordinates: 37°22′05″N 118°46′03″W

Geography
- Location within California
- Location: Inyo County, California, United States
- Parent range: Sierra Nevada
- Topo map: USGS Mount Hilgard

Bear Creek Spire is a mountain in the Sierra Nevada in Inyo County, California, in the western United States, and is the 46th highest mountain in California and the 225th highest mountain in the United States. Bear Creek Spire is part of the John Muir Wilderness and the Inyo National Forest.

== History ==
Bear Creek Spire was named in 1908 by Joseph LeConte, James Hutchinson and Duncan McDuffie, because of its position at the head of the Hilgard Branch of Bear Creek.

== Climbing ==
The first ascent of Bear Creek Spire was a solo climb by Hermann Ulrichs in 1923 up its west face. Norman Clyde established the Northeast Face route in October 1931 and a route up the Northeast Buttress in May 1932.
