= Joe Devel Peak =

Mountain in the state of California

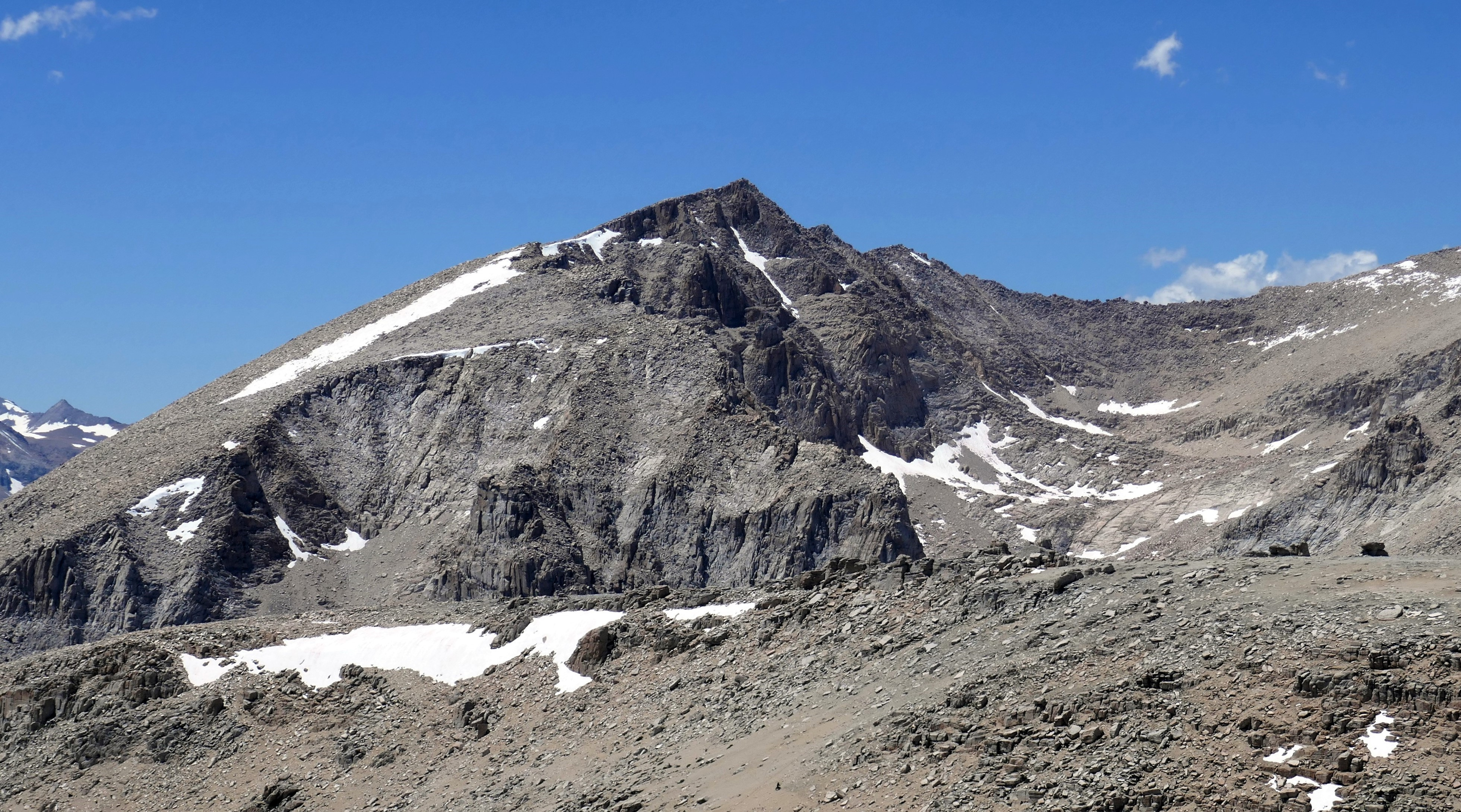
- East aspect

Highest point
- Elevation: 13,327 ft (4,062 m)
- Prominence: 400 ft (120 m)
- Parent peak: Mount Pickering (13,474 ft)
- Isolation: 0.88 mi (1.42 km)
- Listing: Sierra Peaks Section
- Coordinates: 36°30′55″N 118°17′47″W

Naming
- Etymology: Joseph Devel

Geography
- Location within California Location within the United States
- Location: Sequoia National Park; Tulare County; California, U.S.
- Parent range: Sierra Nevada
- Topo map: USGS Mount Whitney

Geology
- Rock age: Cretaceous
- Mountain type: Fault block
- Rock type: granitic

Climbing
- First ascent: 1875
- Easiest route: class 2 from south or southwest

Joe Devel Peak is a 13,327-foot-elevation (4,062-meter) mountain summit located just west of the crest of the Sierra Nevada mountain range in Tulare County, California. Set in Sequoia National Park, it is situated 4.35 miles (7.00 km) south of Mount Whitney, 1.5 miles (2.4 km) southeast of Mount Chamberlin, and 0.87 mile south of Mount Pickering, the nearest higher neighbor. Joe Devel Peak ranks as the 88th-highest summit in California, and the southernmost 4,000-meter peak in the contiguous United States. Topographic relief is significant as the southwest aspect rises over 3,300 feet above Rock Creek in approximately two miles. The Pacific Crest Trail traverses to the south and west of the mountain, providing an approach option. This mountain's name was proposed by Owen L. Williams of the Sierra Club in 1937, and officially adopted by the U.S. Board on Geographic Names, to commemorate Joseph Devel, one of the members of the Wheeler Survey who made the first ascent of this summit on September 20, 1875.

== Climate ==
Joe Devel Peak has an alpine climate. Most weather fronts originate in the Pacific Ocean, and travel east toward the Sierra Nevada mountains. As fronts approach, they are forced upward by the peaks, causing them to drop their moisture in the form of rain or snowfall onto the range (orographic lift). Precipitation runoff from this mountain drains west to the Kern River via Rock Creek.

== Gallery ==
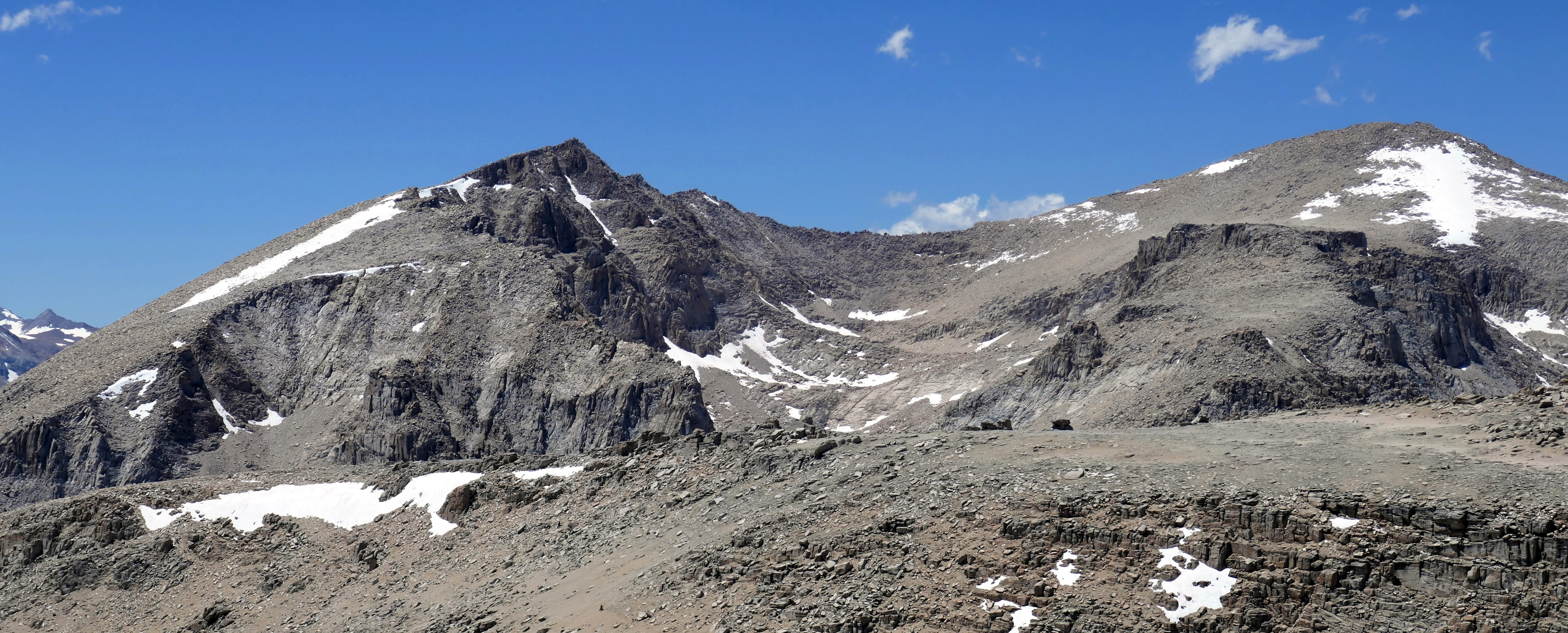
Joe Devel Peak (left) and Mt. Pickering (right) from the east.

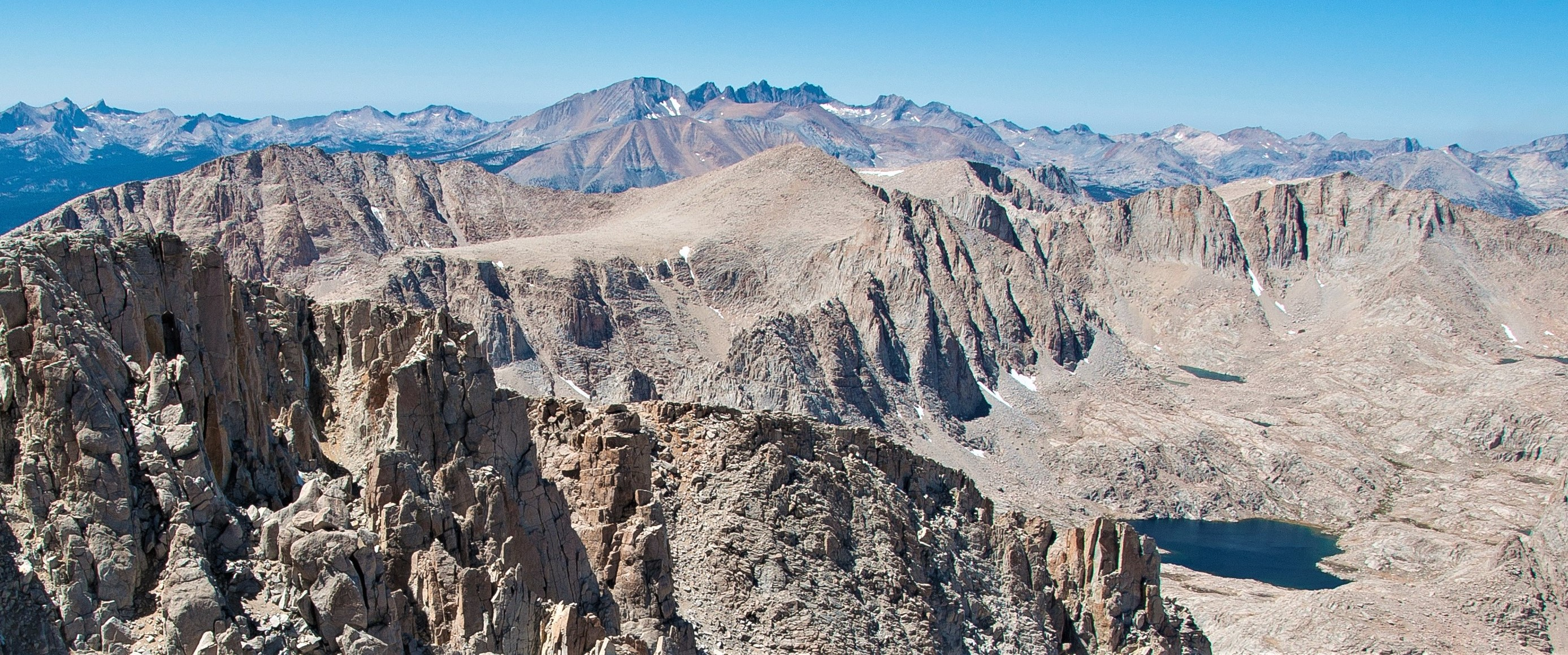
Joe Devel Peak (left), Mt. Pickering centered, Kaweah peaks centered in the distance, Mount Newcomb (right), viewed from Mt. Langley.

== See also ==
- List of the major 4000-meter summits of California
