= Mount Pickering =

Mountain in the state of California

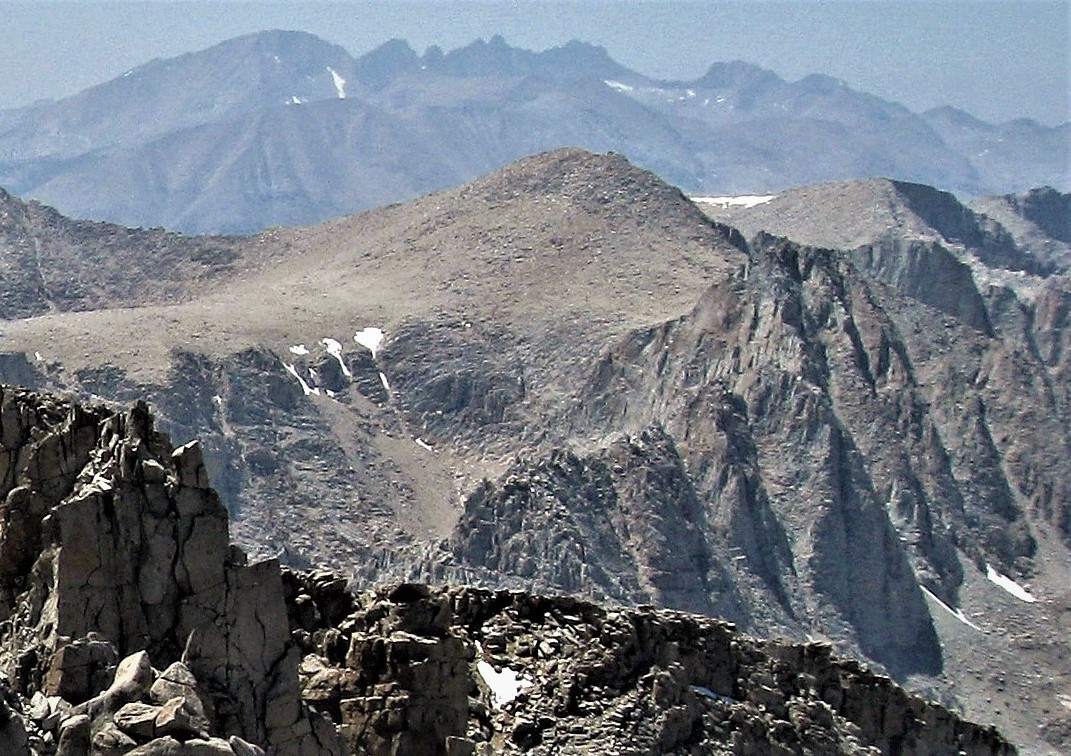
- East aspect, from Mount Langley

Highest point
- Elevation: 13,474 ft (4,107 m)
- Prominence: 547 ft (167 m)
- Parent peak: Mount McAdie (13,799 ft)
- Isolation: 1.88 mi (3.03 km)
- Listing: Sierra Peaks Section
- Coordinates: 36°31′38″N 118°17′27″W

Naming
- Etymology: Edward Charles Pickering

Geography
- Location within California Location within the United States
- Location: Sequoia National Park; Tulare County; California, U.S.
- Parent range: Sierra Nevada
- Topo map: USGS Mount Whitney

Geology
- Rock age: Cretaceous
- Mountain type: Fault block
- Rock type: granitic

Climbing
- First ascent: 1936
- Easiest route: class 2 Southeast arête

Mount Pickering is a 13,474-foot-elevation (4,107-meter) mountain summit located just west of the crest of the Sierra Nevada mountain range in Tulare County, California. It is situated in Sequoia National Park, and is 3.1 miles (5.0 km) south of Mount Whitney, 1.2 miles (1.9 km) southeast of Mount Chamberlin, and one mile south of Mount Newcomb. Mt. Pickering ranks as the 65th highest summit in California. Topographic relief is significant as it rises nearly 2,000 feet above Sky Blue Lake in approximately one mile. This mountain's name was proposed by the Sierra Club and officially adopted in 1940 by the U.S. Board on Geographic Names to honor American astronomer Edward Charles Pickering (1846–1919). The immediate area has other geographical features named for astronomers, including Mount Newcomb, Mount Langley, Mount Young, and Mount Hale. The first ascent of the summit was made July 16, 1936, by Chester Versteeg, Tyler Van Degrift, and Oliver Kehrlein.

== Climate ==
Mount Pickering has an alpine climate. Most weather fronts originate in the Pacific Ocean, and travel east toward the Sierra Nevada mountains. As fronts approach, they are forced upward by the peaks, causing them to drop their moisture in the form of rain or snowfall onto the range (orographic lift). Precipitation runoff from this mountain drains west to the Kern River via Rock Creek.

== Gallery ==
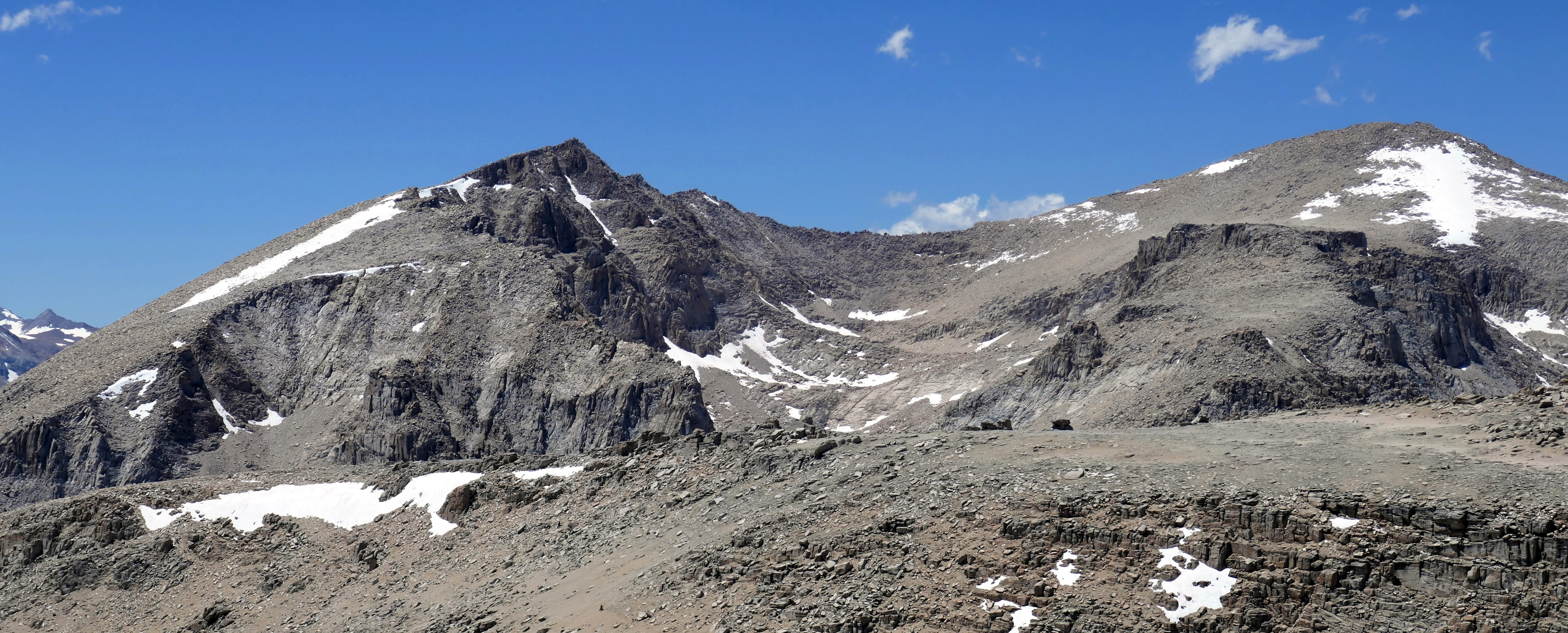
Joe Devel Peak (left) and Mt. Pickering (right) from the east.

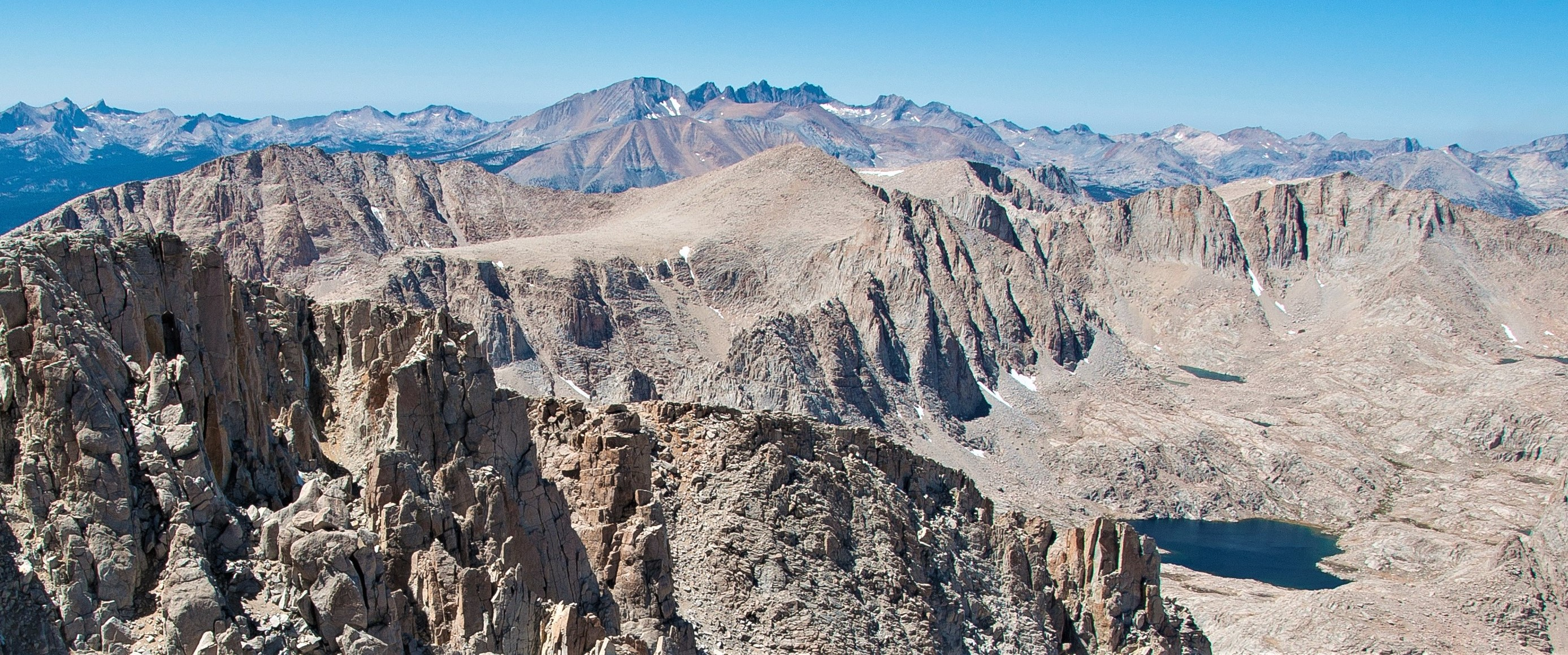
Joe Devel Peak (left), Mt. Pickering centered, Kaweah peaks centered in the distance, Mt. Newcomb (right), viewed from Mt. Langley.

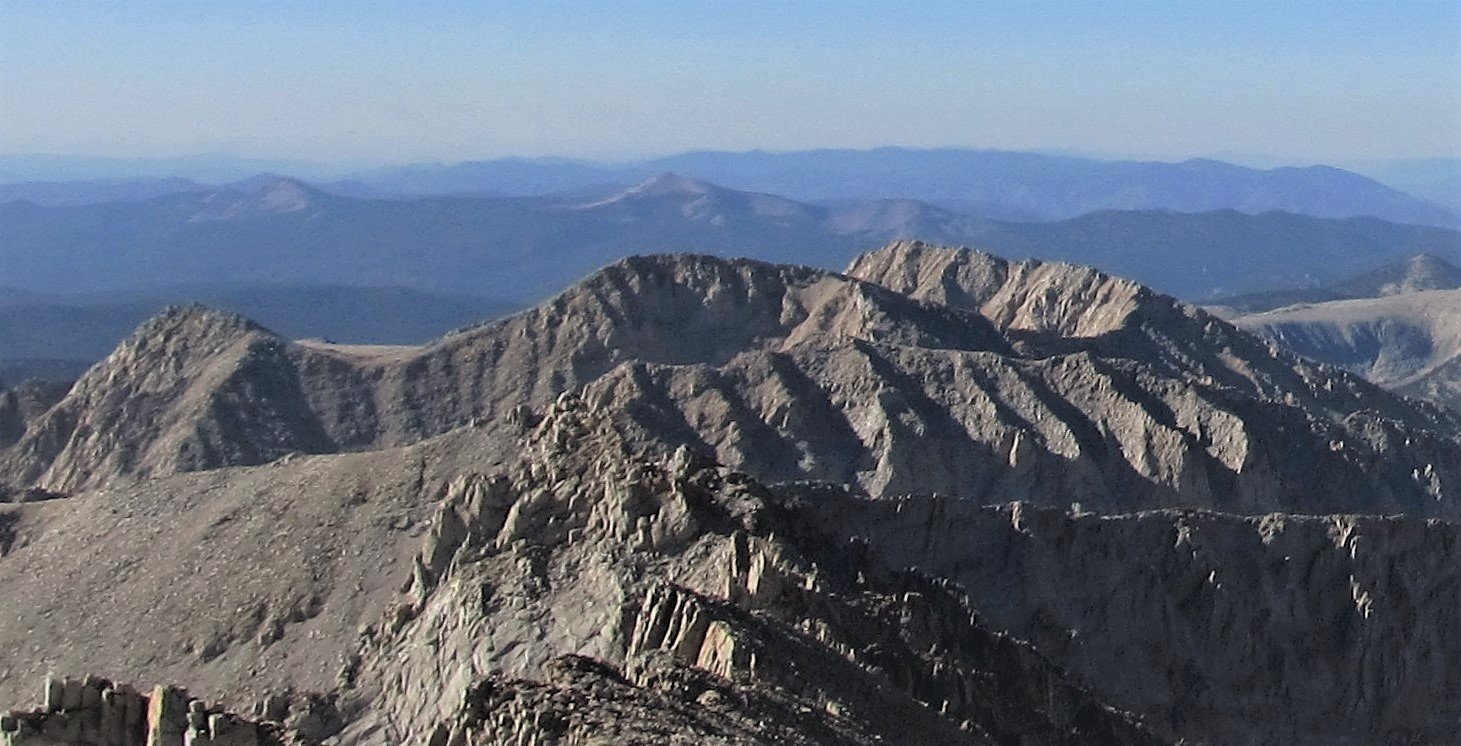
The top of Mount Pickering centered, as seen from Mount Whitney.

== See also ==
- List of the major 4000-meter summits of California
