= Mount Hale =

Mount Hale is the name of more than one mountain, including:

- Mount Hale (Antarctica), a peak in the Sentinel Range, Antarctica
- Mount Hale (California), in the Sierra Nevada, USA
- Mount Hale (New Hampshire) in the White Mountains of New Hampshire, USA
