= Mount Chamberlin =

Mount Chamberlin may refer to:

- Mount Chamberlin (Alaska) in the Brooks Range, Alaska, USA
- Mount Chamberlin (British Columbia) in Canada
- Mount Chamberlin (California) in California, USA
