= Mount Irvine =

Mount Irvine may refer to:

- Mount Irvine (Antarctica)
- Mount Irvine, New South Wales a mountain and locality in Australia
- Mount Irvine (California), a mountain in the Sierra Nevada of California
- Mount Irvine (New York), a mountain
- Mount Irvine Bay Golf Club, a golf course in Trinidad and Tobago
