= Mount Randy Morgenson =

Mountain in the state of California

- Mount Morgenson
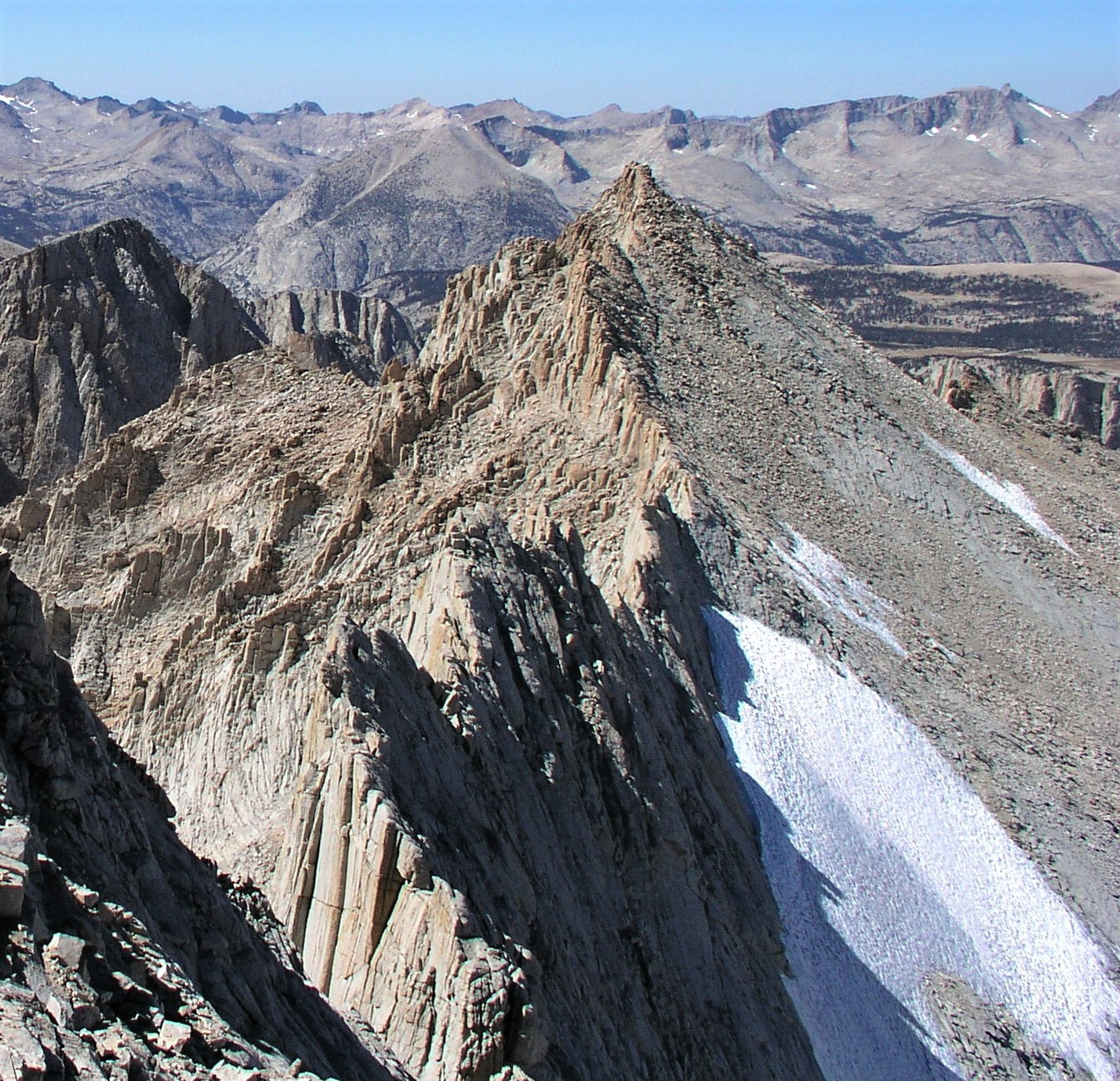
- As seen from Mount Russell

Highest point
- Elevation: 13,927 ft (4,245 m)
- Prominence: 279 ft (85 m)
- Parent peak: Mount Russell (14,088 ft)
- Isolation: 0.51 mi (0.82 km)
- Coordinates: 36°35′30″N 118°17′59″W

Naming
- Etymology: Randy Morgenson (park ranger)

Geography
- Location within California Location within the United States
- Location: Sequoia National Park; Tulare County California, U.S.
- Parent range: Sierra Nevada
- Topo map: USGS Mount Whitney

Geology
- Rock age: Cretaceous
- Mountain type: Fault block
- Rock type: granite

Climbing
- First ascent: 1926 Norman Clyde
- Easiest route: class 2

Mount Randy Morgenson is a 13,927-foot-elevation (4,245-meter) mountain summit located along the crest of the Sierra Nevada mountain range in Tulare County, California. It is situated in Sequoia National Park, one mile north-northwest of Mount Whitney, 0.85 mile east of Mount Hale, and one-half mile west of Mount Russell, the nearest higher neighbor. The John Muir Trail traverses to the south of the mountain, providing an approach option. Mt. Morgenson ranks as the 20th-highest summit in California. Topographic relief is significant as the northwest aspect rises 2,200 feet (670 meters) above Wales Lake in less than one mile.

== History ==
This mountain's name honors esteemed park ranger James Randall "Randy" Morgenson (1945–1996), who vanished in July 1996 while on patrol in Sequoia-Kings Canyon National Park. Despite one of the most intense search-and-rescue operations in National Park Service history, his body wasn't found until five years later. This peak's unofficial name has not been adopted by the U. S. Board on Geographic Names and so it does not appear on USGS maps. Instead, Mount Randy Morgenson is labeled "Peak 4245 m (13,920+ ft)" on USGS maps.

The first ascent of the summit was made June 27, 1926, by Norman Clyde, who is credited with 130 first ascents, most of which were in the Sierra Nevada.

== Climate ==
Mount Randy Morgenson is located in an alpine climate zone. Most weather fronts originate in the Pacific Ocean, and travel east toward the Sierra Nevada mountains. As fronts approach, they are forced upward by the peaks (orographic lift), causing them to drop their moisture in the form of rain or snowfall onto the range. Precipitation runoff from this mountain drains west to the Kern River via Wallace and Whitney Creeks.

== Gallery ==
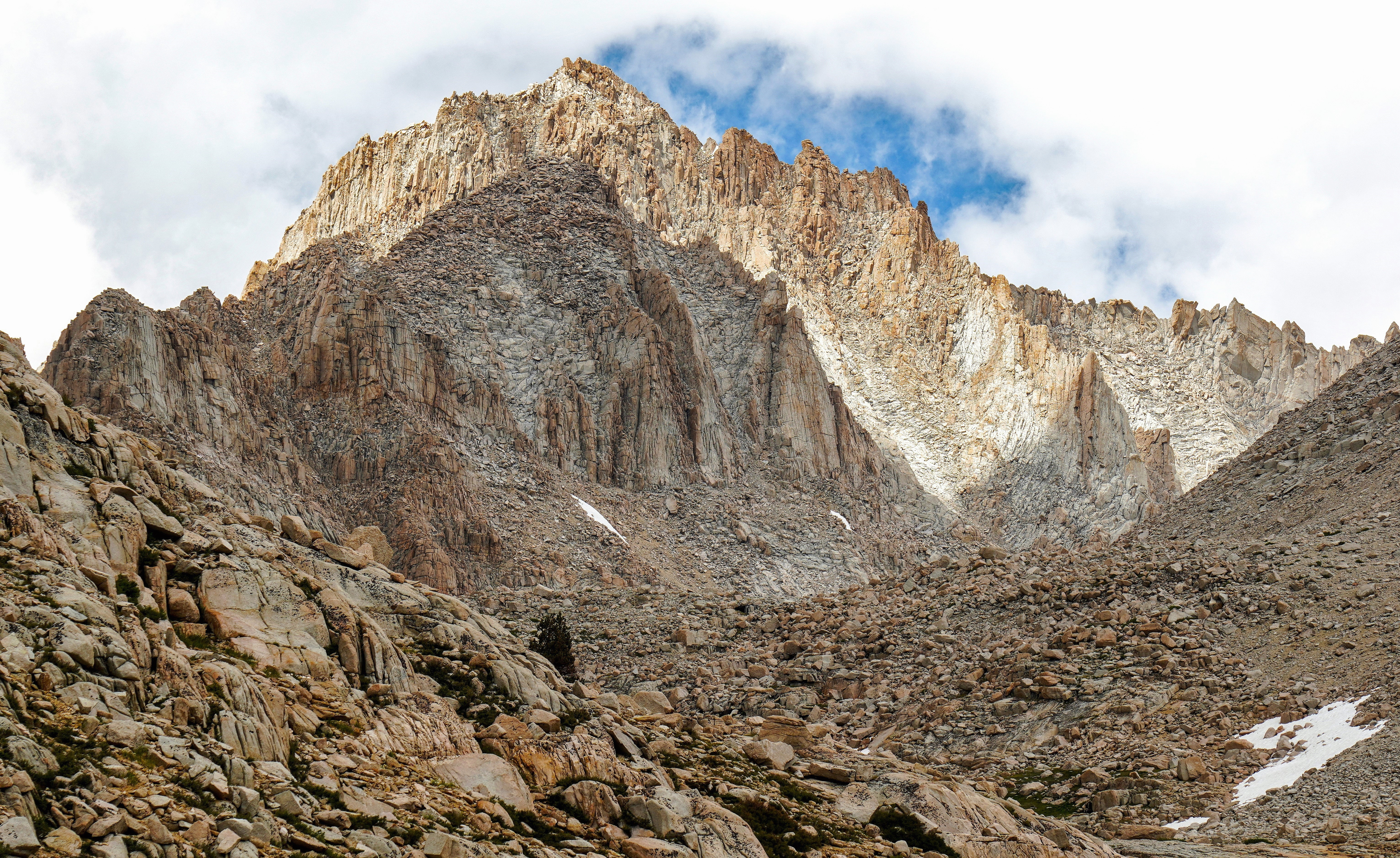
Looking up the Arctic Lake drainage to the south aspect of Mount Randy Morgenson

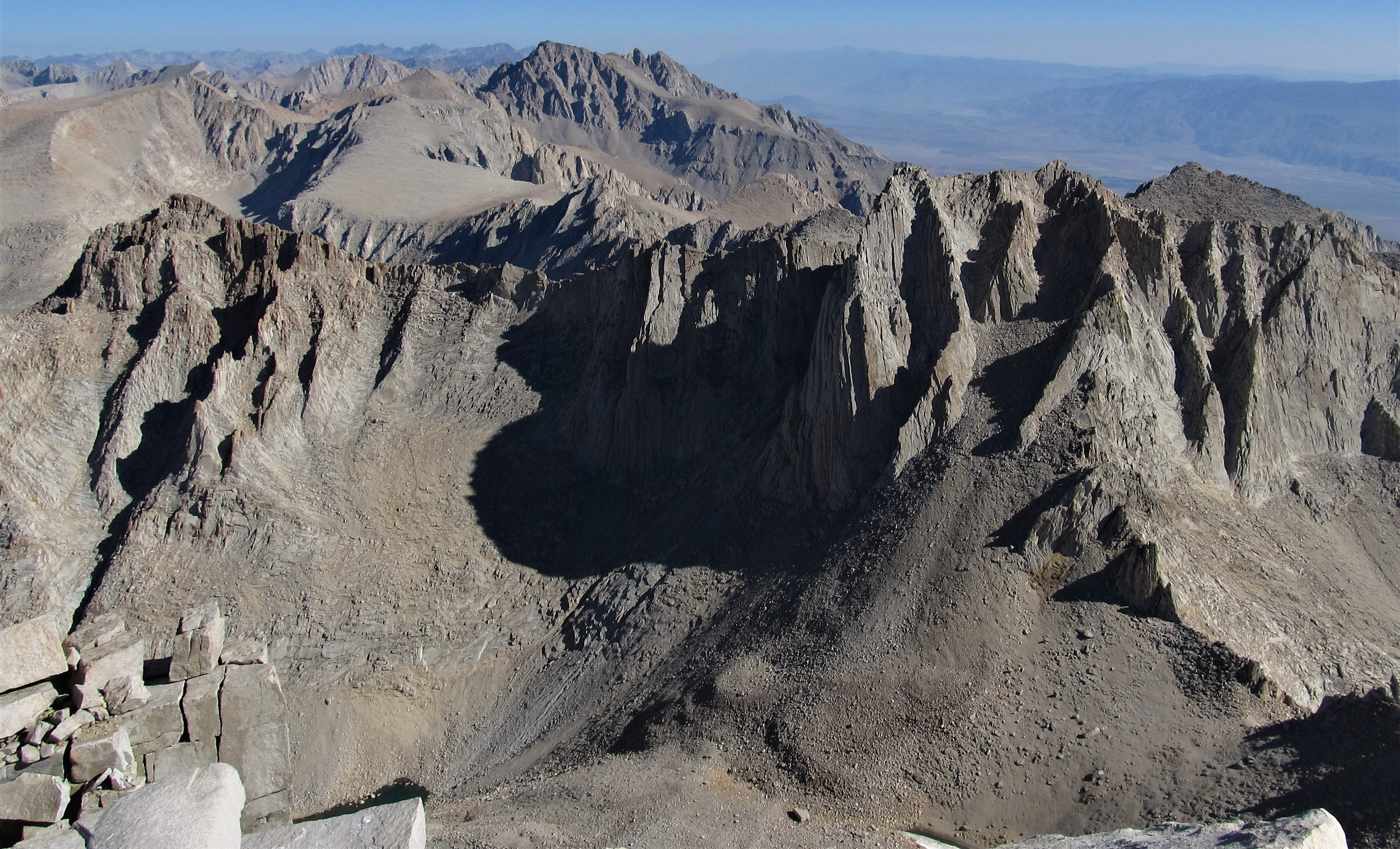
Mts. Morgenson (left), Williamson (top), and Russell (right) seen from Mount Whitney's summit.

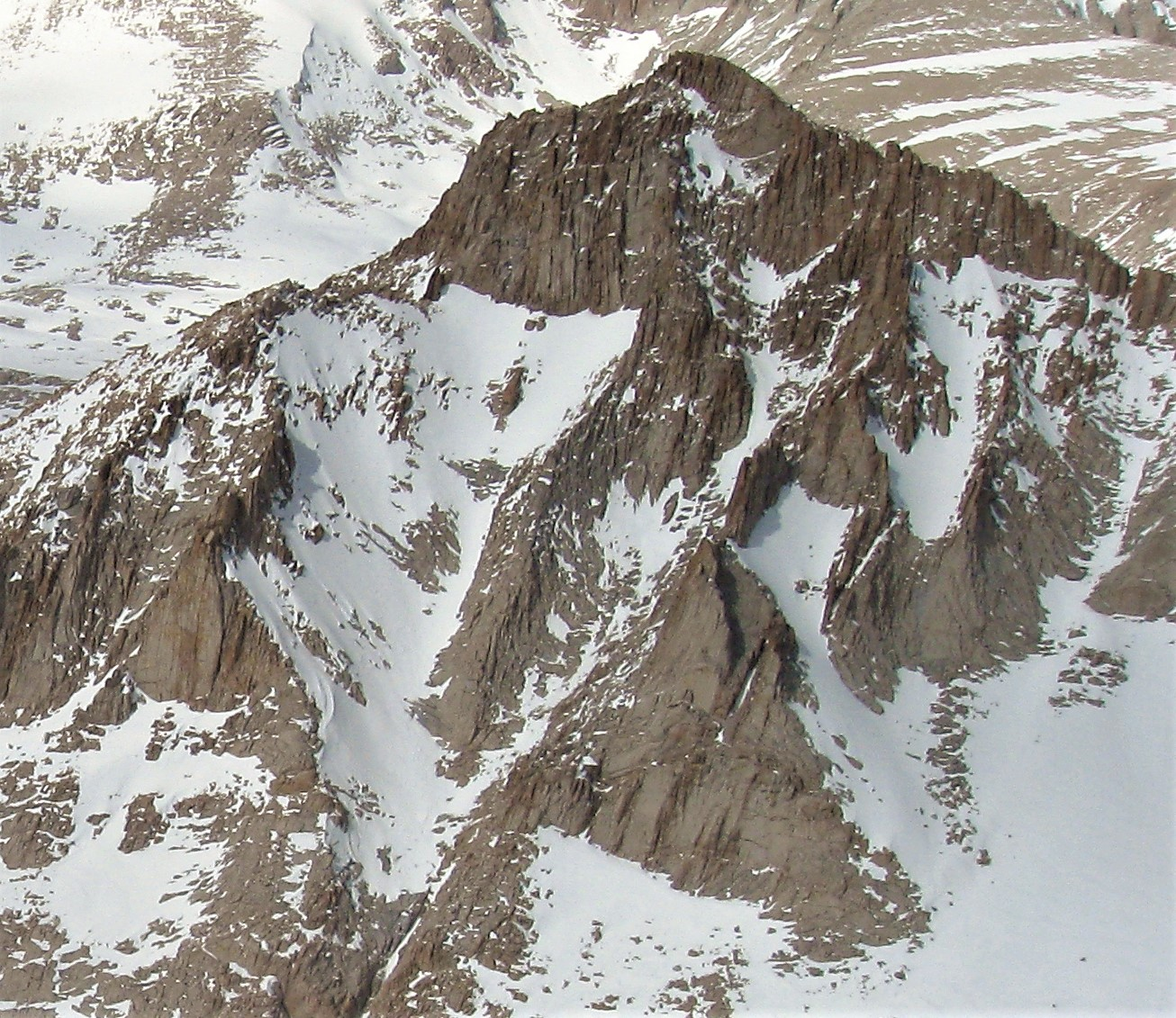

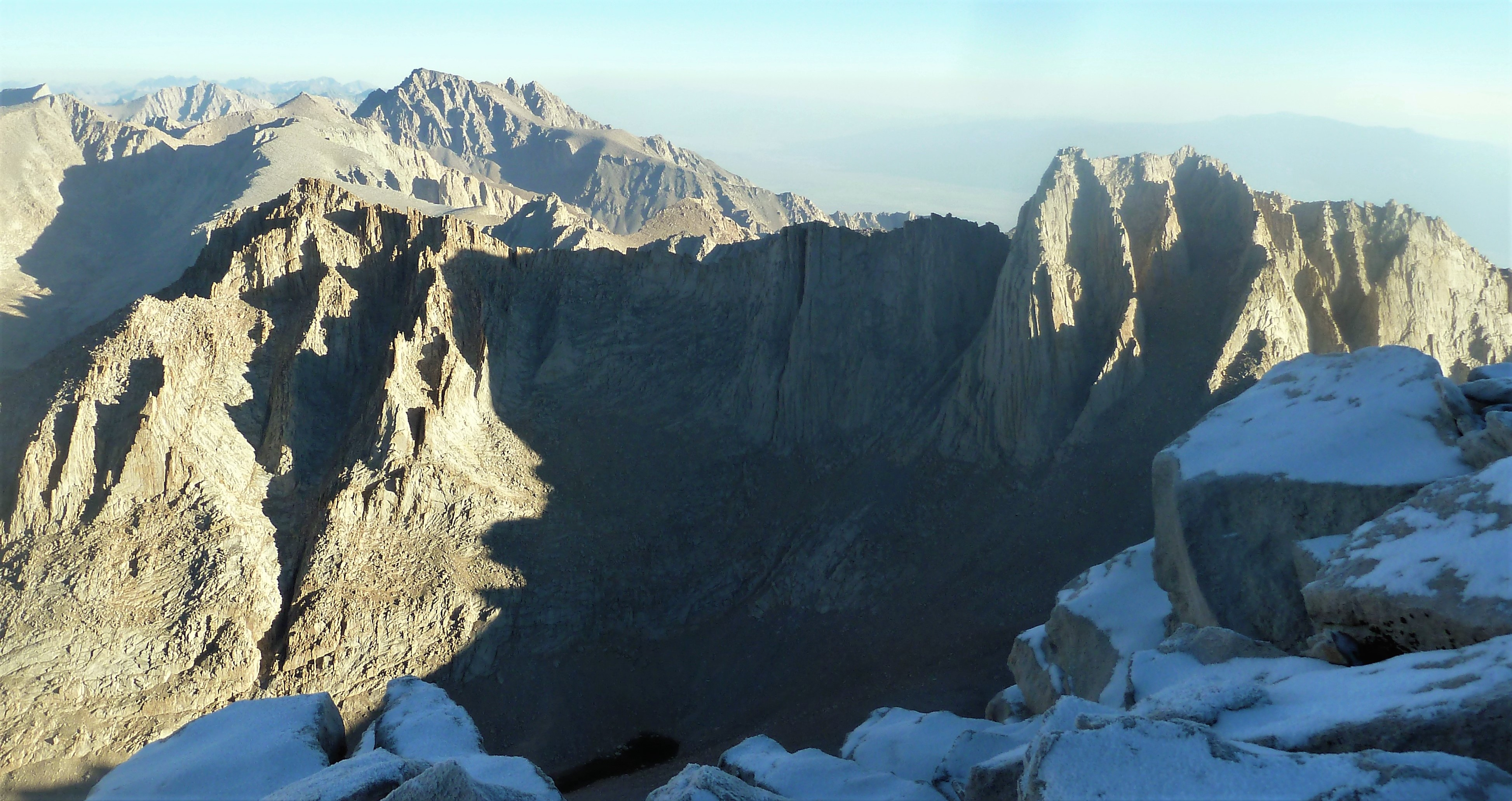
Mt. Morgenson left, Mt. Russell right, Mt. Williamson in the background.

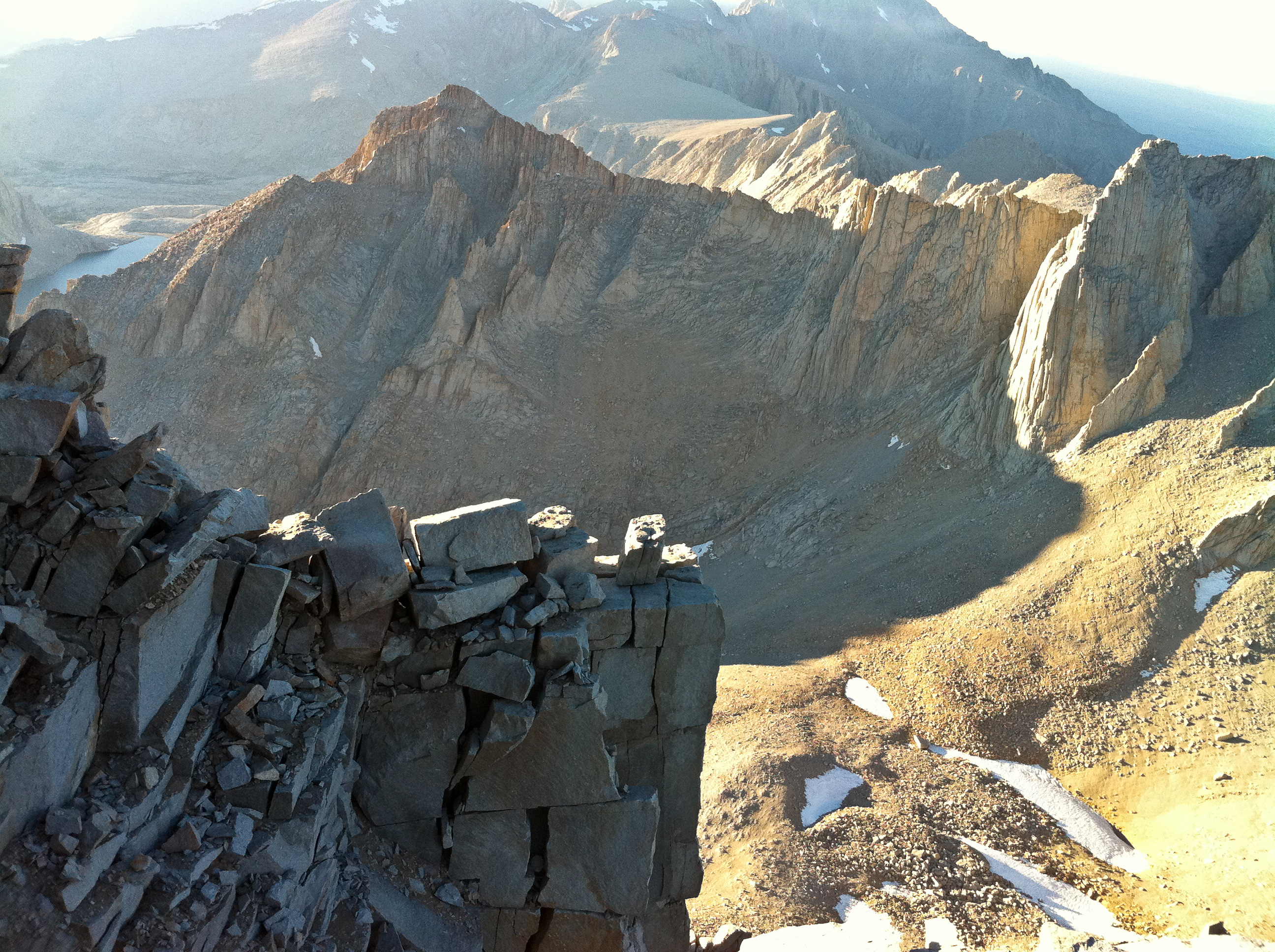

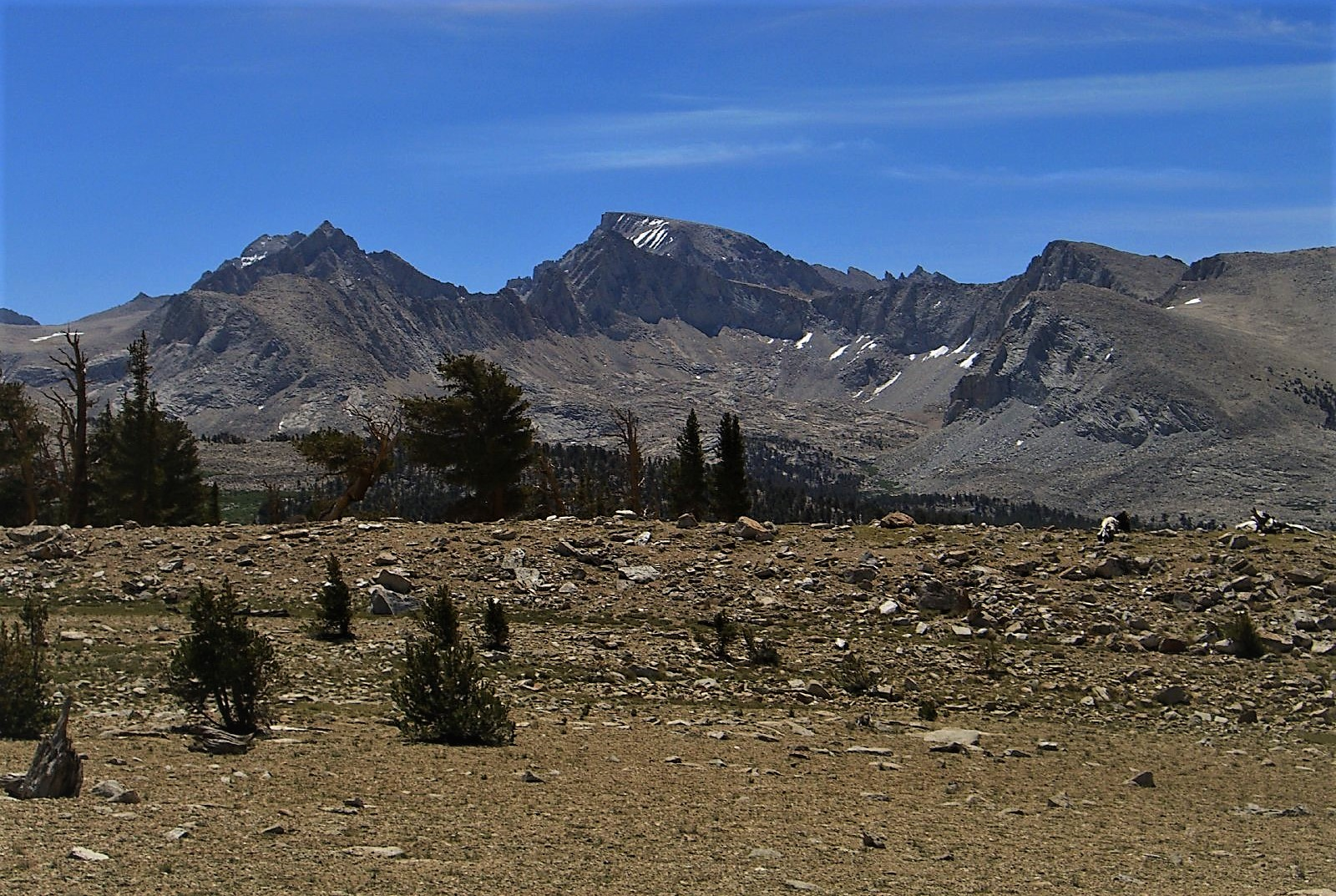
Morgenson (left), Whitney/Hale (center). From the northwest.

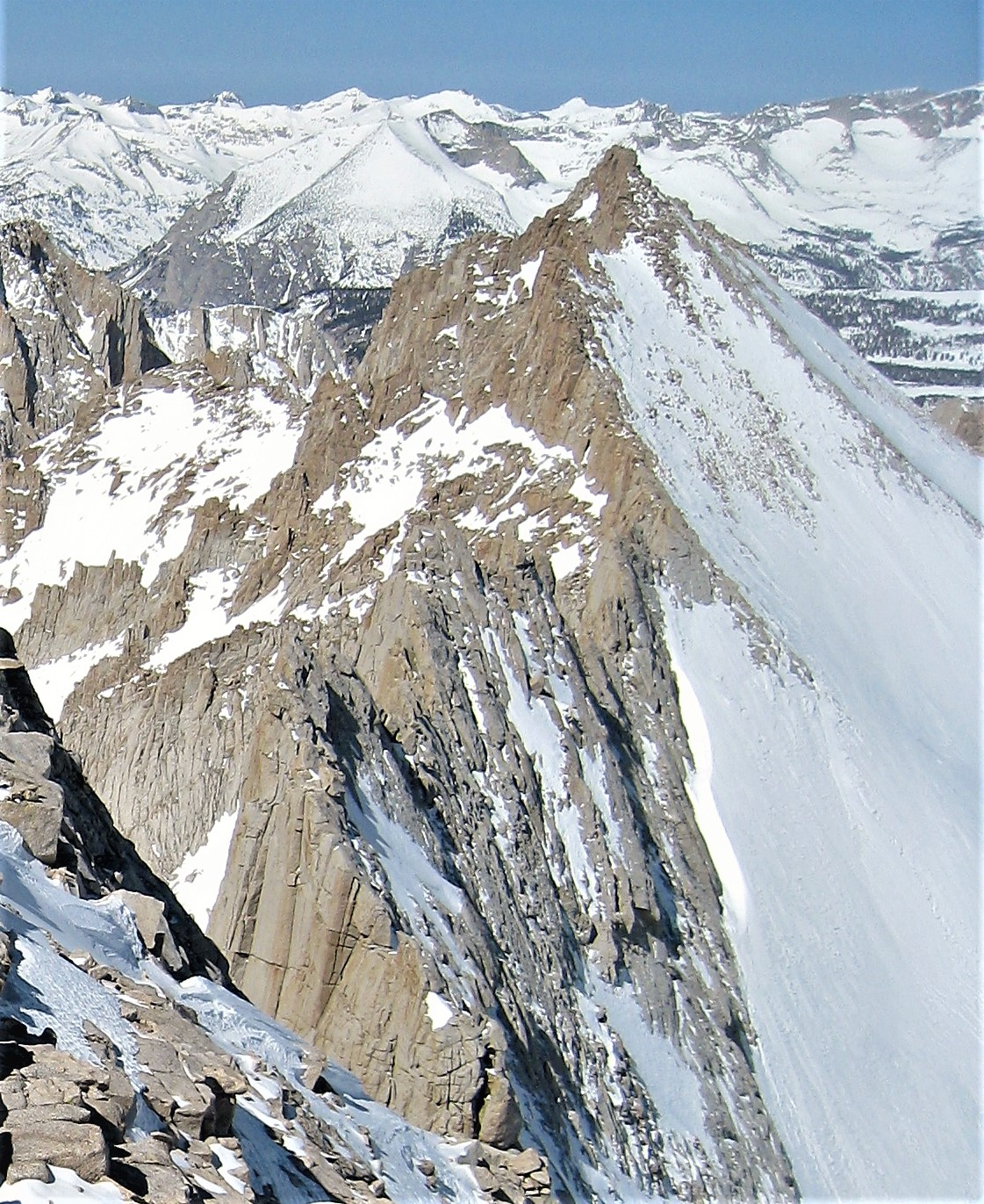
As seen from Mt. Russell

== See also ==
- List of the major 4000-meter summits of California
