= Mount Le Conte (California) =

Mountain in the state of California

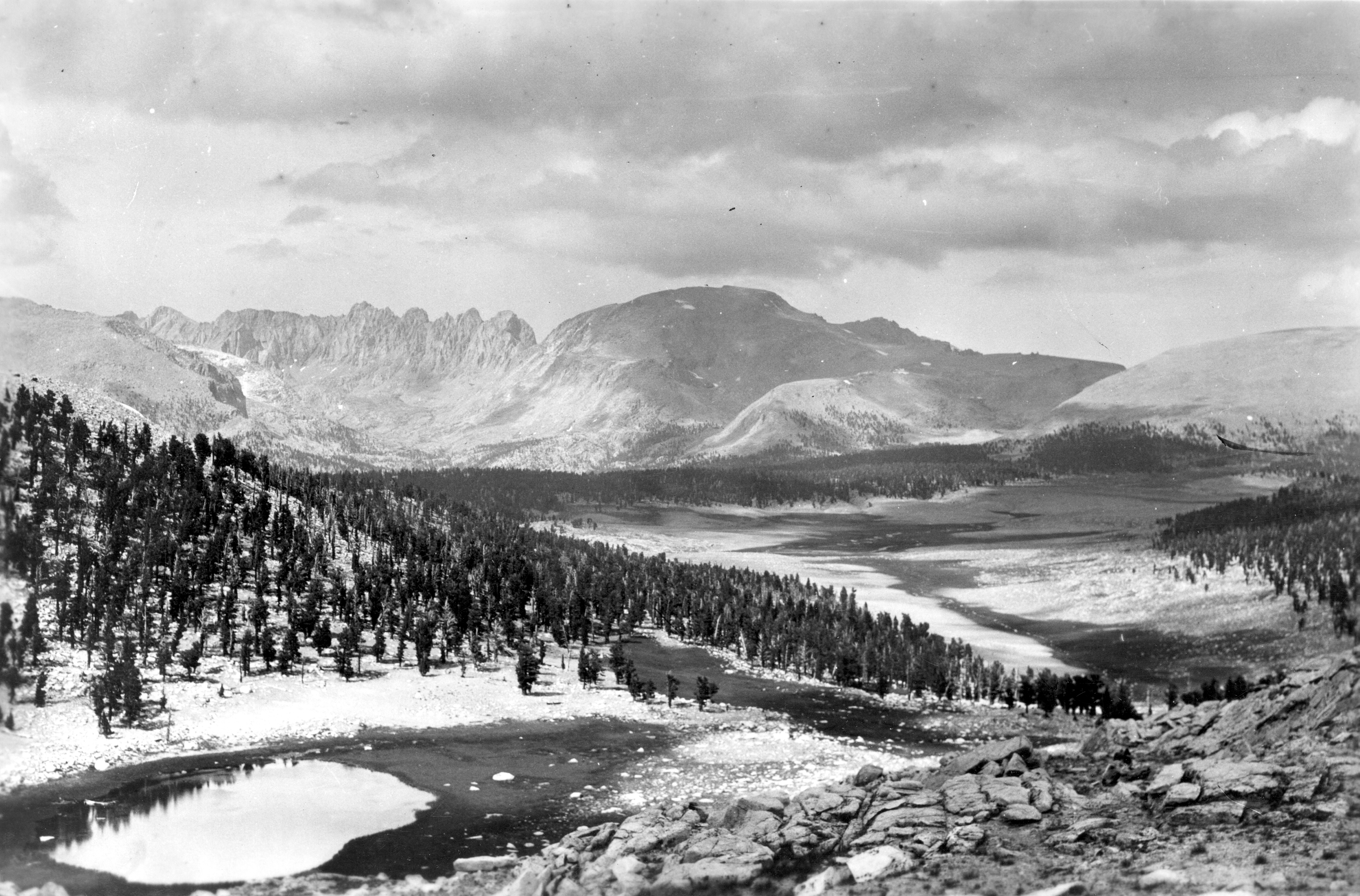
- Mount Le Conte from Boreal Plateau.

Highest point
- Elevation: 13,936 ft (4,248 m) NAVD 88
- Prominence: 1,003 ft (306 m)
- Parent peak: Mount Whitney
- Listing: SPS Mountaineers peak; Western States Climbers Star peak
- Coordinates: 36°32′27″N 118°15′07″W

Geography
- Location within California
- Location: Inyo and Tulare counties, California, U.S.
- Parent range: Sierra Nevada
- Topo map: USGS Mount Whitney

Climbing
- First ascent: July 1925 by Norman Clyde
- Easiest route: Exposed scramble, class 3

Mount Le Conte (or LeConte) is a mountain located in the Sierra Nevada of California. The boundary between Inyo and Tulare counties runs along the crest of the Sierra, across Mount Le Conte. The mountain was named in 1895 for Joseph Le Conte (1823–1901), the first professor of geology and natural history at the University of California.

== Geography ==
Mount Le Conte is about 3.5 miles (5.6 km) southeast of Mount Whitney, and is flanked to the northwest by Mount Mallory, and to the southeast by Mount Corcoran.

The southwest side of Mount Le Conte drains into Rock Creek, thence into the Kern River, which ends in the Central Valley of California. The north side of Mount Le Conte drains into Meysan Creek, thence into Lone Pine Creek, which ends in the Owens Valley. The east side of Le Conte drains into Tuttle Creek, and thence into Diaz Lake in the Owens Valley.

The southwest side is in Sequoia National Park while the north and east is in the John Muir Wilderness of the Inyo National Forest. The Pacific Crest Trail enters the park from the south at Siberian Pass about 5 miles (8.0 km) south of Mount Le Conte, and runs through the park a few miles west of the Sierra Crest.

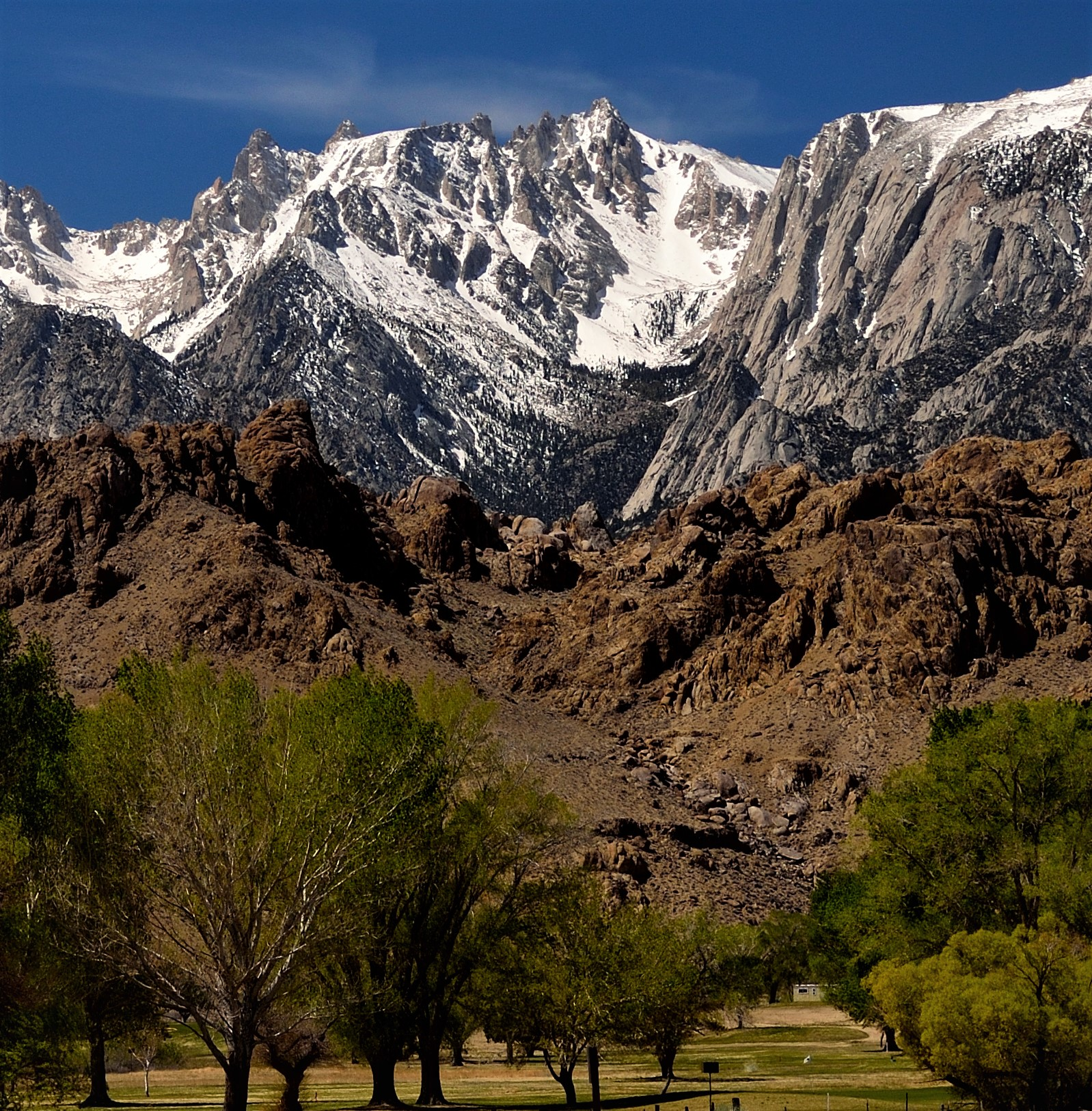
Mt. LeConte from the east

== See also ==
- Mountain peaks of California
