= Mount Mallory =

Mountain in the state of California

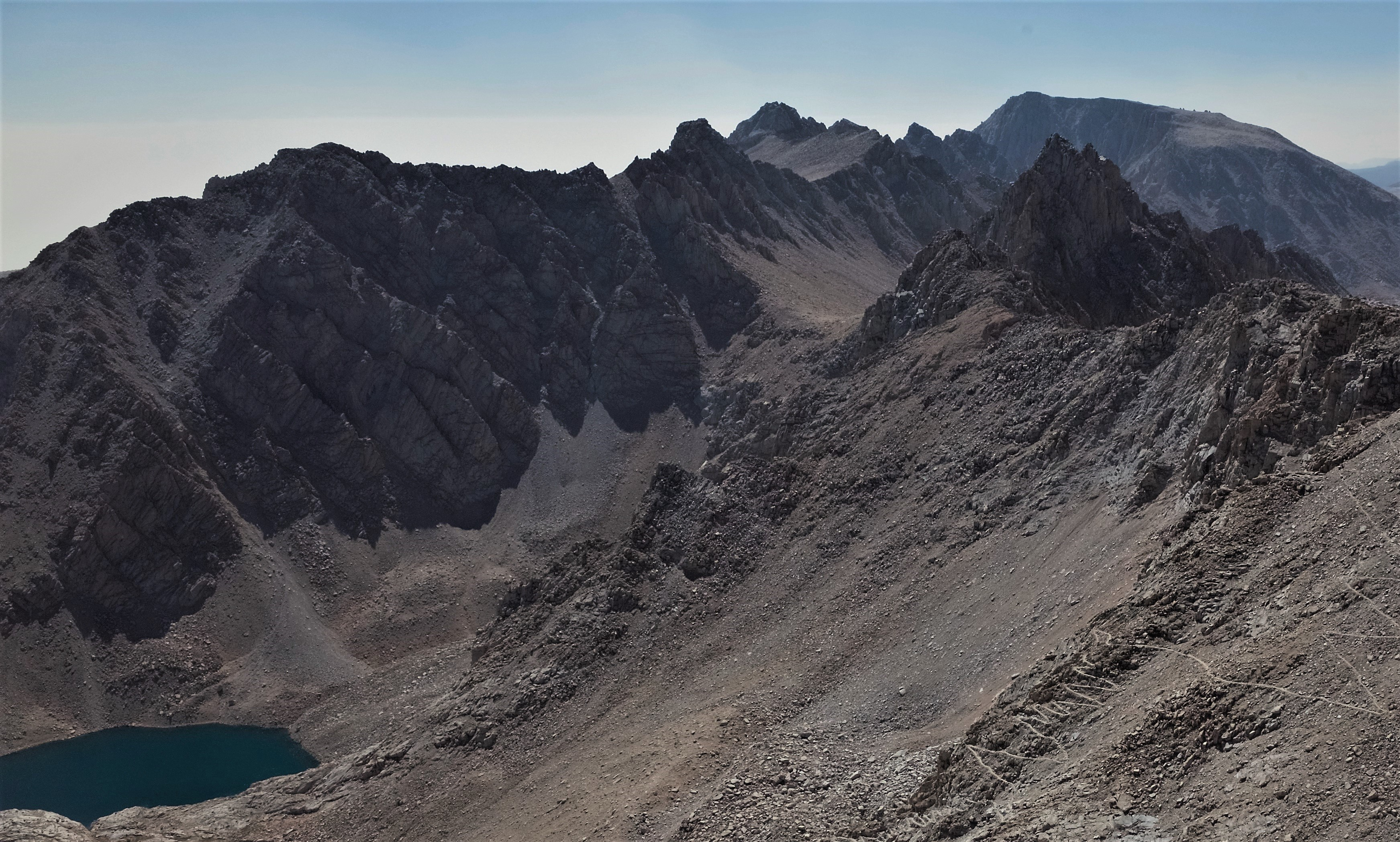
- Mount Mallory centered, from Mt. Whitney

Highest point
- Elevation: 13,851 ft (4,222 m) NAVD 88
- Prominence: 722 ft (220 m)
- Parent peak: Mount LeConte
- Listing: Sierra Peaks Section; Western States Climbers Emblem peak
- Coordinates: 36°32′56″N 118°15′46″W

Geography
- Location within California
- Location: Inyo / Tulare counties, California, U.S.
- Parent range: Sierra Nevada
- Topo map: USGS Mount Whitney

Climbing
- First ascent: 1925 by Norman Clyde
- Easiest route: East Slopes, class 2

Mount Mallory is a mountain located in the Sierra Nevada of California. The boundary between Inyo National Forest and Sequoia National Park runs across the summit. The peak was named in memory of George H. Leigh Mallory, of the 1924 British Mount Everest expedition, who was lost on Mount Everest, June, 1924. Norman Clyde advanced Mallory's and Andrew Irvine's names following their loss after attaining the highest altitude reached by a mountain climber.

== Geography ==
Mount Mallory is located southeast of Mount Whitney, and is flanked to the north by Mount Irvine, and to the southeast by Mount LeConte. The southwest side, in Tulare County, is in Sequoia National Park. The north and east sides, in Inyo County, are in the John Muir Wilderness of the Inyo National Forest.

== Climbing ==
There are several routes typically used to climb Mount Mallory. It can be climbed from the East via Green Pass from the Meysan Lake Trailhead, or it can be climbed from the west via Arc Pass. The East slopes present the most obvious route, and the mountain is often climbed in conjunction with Mount Irvine.

== See also ==
- Mountain peaks of California
