= Mount Hale (California) =

Mountain in the state of California

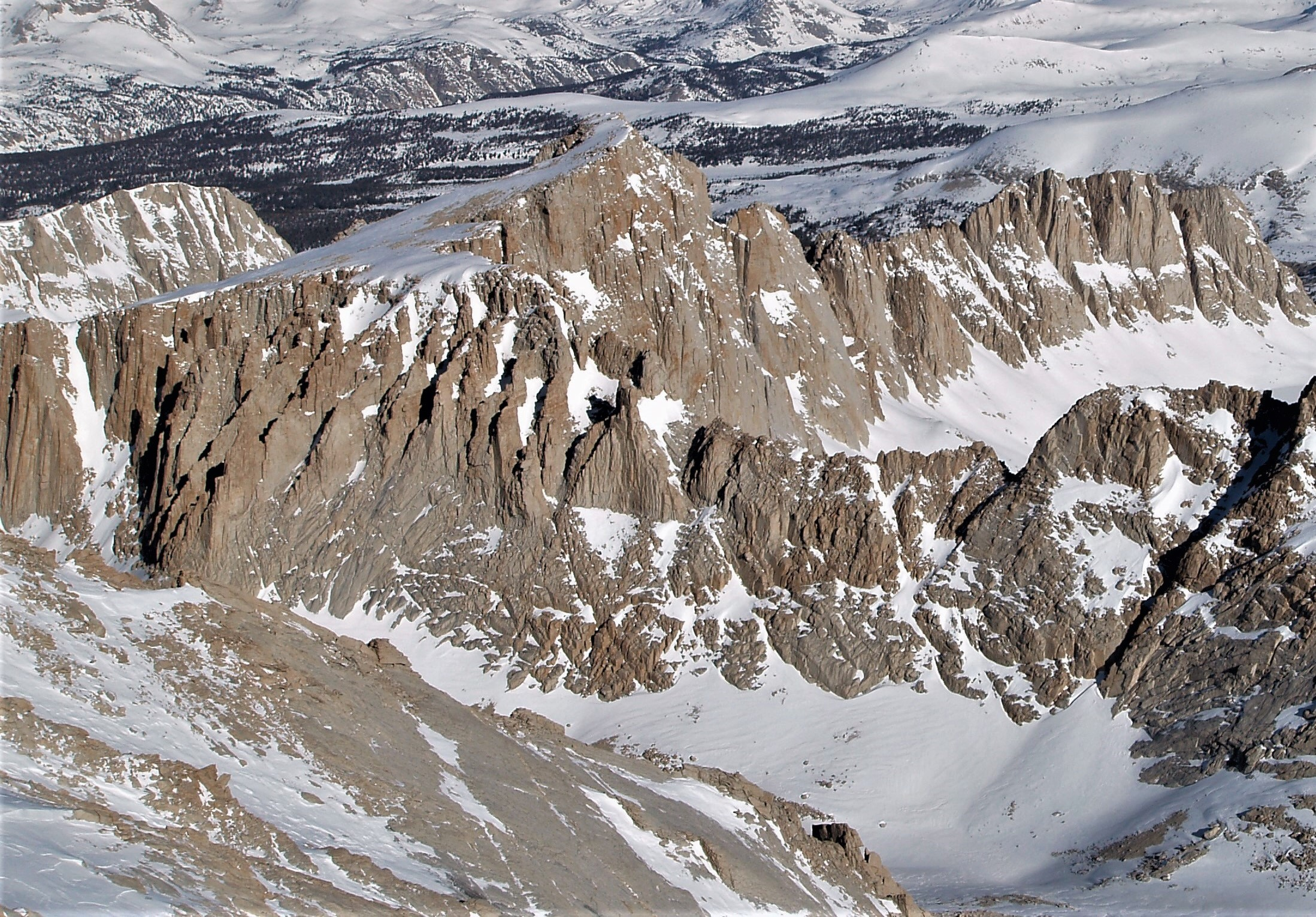
- East aspect, from Mt. Whitney

Highest point
- Elevation: 13,494 ft (4,113 m)
- Prominence: 633 ft (193 m)
- Parent peak: Mt. Randy Morgenson (13,927 ft)
- Isolation: 0.85 mi (1.37 km)
- Listing: Sierra Peaks Section
- Coordinates: 36°35′17″N 118°18′53″W

Naming
- Etymology: George Ellery Hale

Geography
- Location within California Location within the United States
- Location: Sequoia National Park; Tulare County; California, U.S.
- Parent range: Sierra Nevada
- Topo map: USGS Mount Whitney

Geology
- Rock age: Cretaceous
- Mountain type: Fault block
- Rock type: granite

Climbing
- First ascent: 1934
- Easiest route: class 2 South slope

Mount Hale is a 13,494-foot-elevation (4,113-meter) mountain summit located west of the crest of the Sierra Nevada mountain range in Tulare County, California. It is situated in Sequoia National Park, 1.4 mile northwest of Mount Whitney, one mile northeast of Mount Young, and 0.85 mile west-southwest of Mount Randy Morgenson, the nearest higher neighbor. The John Muir Trail traverses below the south aspect of the mountain, providing approach access. Mt. Hale ranks as the 63rd-highest summit in California. Topographic relief is significant as the north aspect rises 1,770 feet (540 meters) above Wales Lake in approximately one-quarter mile.

== History ==
This mountain's name was proposed by the Sierra Club and officially adopted in 1940 by the U.S. Board on Geographic Names to honor the eminent American astronomer George Ellery Hale (1868–1938), best known for his discovery of magnetic fields in sunspots, and founder of the Mount Wilson Observatory. The immediate area has other geographical features named after astronomers, including Mount Newcomb, Mount Langley, Mount Young, Mount Pickering, and Mount Barnard.

The first ascent of the summit was made July 24, 1934, by J. H. Czock and Mildred Czock via the south slope.

== Climate ==
Mount Hale has an alpine climate. Most weather fronts originate in the Pacific Ocean, and travel east toward the Sierra Nevada mountains. As fronts approach, they are forced upward by the peaks, causing them to drop their moisture in the form of rain or snowfall onto the range (orographic lift). Precipitation runoff from this mountain drains west to the Kern River via Wallace and Whitney Creeks.

== See also ==
- List of the major 4000-meter summits of California
