= Mount Newcomb =

Mountain in California, United States

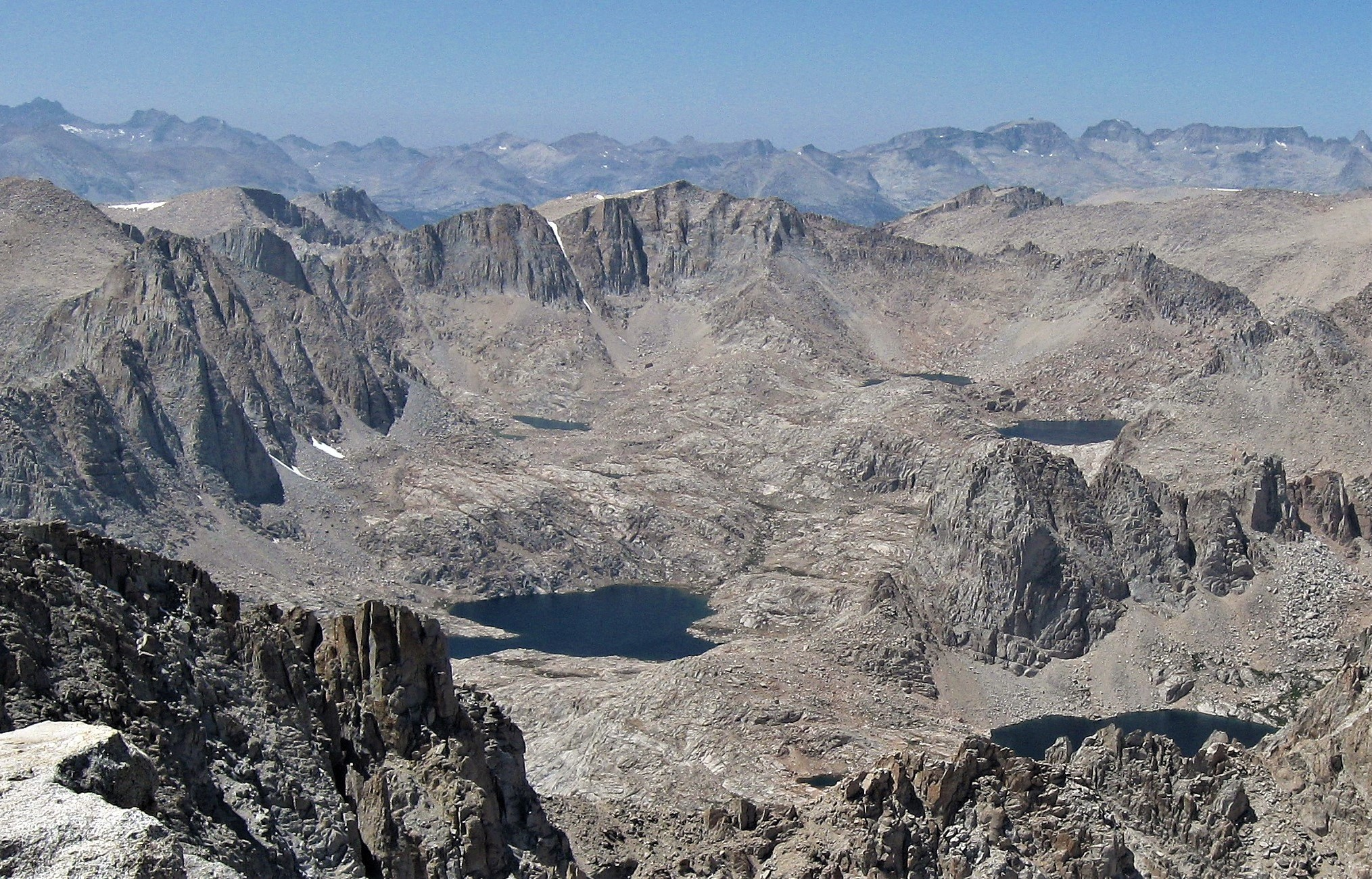
- East aspect, from Mount Langley

Highest point
- Elevation: 13,422 ft (4,091 m)
- Prominence: 561 ft (171 m)
- Parent peak: Mount Pickering (13,474 ft)
- Isolation: 0.90 mi (1.45 km)
- Listing: Sierra Peaks Section
- Coordinates: 36°32′24″N 118°17′36″W

Naming
- Etymology: Simon Newcomb

Geography
- Location within California Location within the United States
- Location: Sequoia National Park; Tulare County; California, U.S.
- Parent range: Sierra Nevada
- Topo map: USGS Mount Whitney

Geology
- Rock age: Cretaceous
- Mountain type: Fault block
- Rock type: granitic

Climbing
- First ascent: 1936
- Easiest route: class 2

Mount Newcomb is a 13,422-foot-elevation (4,091-meter) mountain summit located just west of the crest of the Sierra Nevada mountain range in Tulare County, California. It is situated in Sequoia National Park, and is 2.8 miles (4.5 km) south of Mount Whitney, 1.1 miles (1.8 km) northeast of Mount Chamberlin, and 3.5 miles west of Mount Corcoran. Mt. Newcomb ranks as the 70th highest summit in California. Topographic relief is significant as it rises 2,083 feet (635 meters) above the second Crabtree Lake in approximately one mile. This mountain's name was officially adopted in 1940 by the U.S. Board on Geographic Names to honor American astronomer Simon Newcomb (1835–1909). The first ascent of the summit was made August 22, 1936, by Max Eckenburg and Bob Rumohr.

== Climbing ==
Established climbing routes:

- Southwest Slope – class 2 – 1936 by Max Eckenburg and Bob Rumohr
- Southwest Ridge – class 3 – 1956 by George O. Hale
- Northeast Ridge – class 3 – 2004 by Bob Sumner
- South Ridge – class 3
- The Keep – class 5.10 – 2001 by Dave Nettle, Aaron Zanto

== Climate ==
According to the Köppen climate classification system, Mount Newcomb has an alpine climate. Most weather fronts originate in the Pacific Ocean, and travel east toward the Sierra Nevada mountains. As fronts approach, they are forced upward by the peaks, causing them to drop their moisture in the form of rain or snowfall onto the range (orographic lift). Precipitation runoff from this mountain drains west to the Kern River via Whitney and Rock Creeks.

== See also ==
- List of mountain peaks of California
