= Mount Irvine (California) =

Mountain in the American state of California

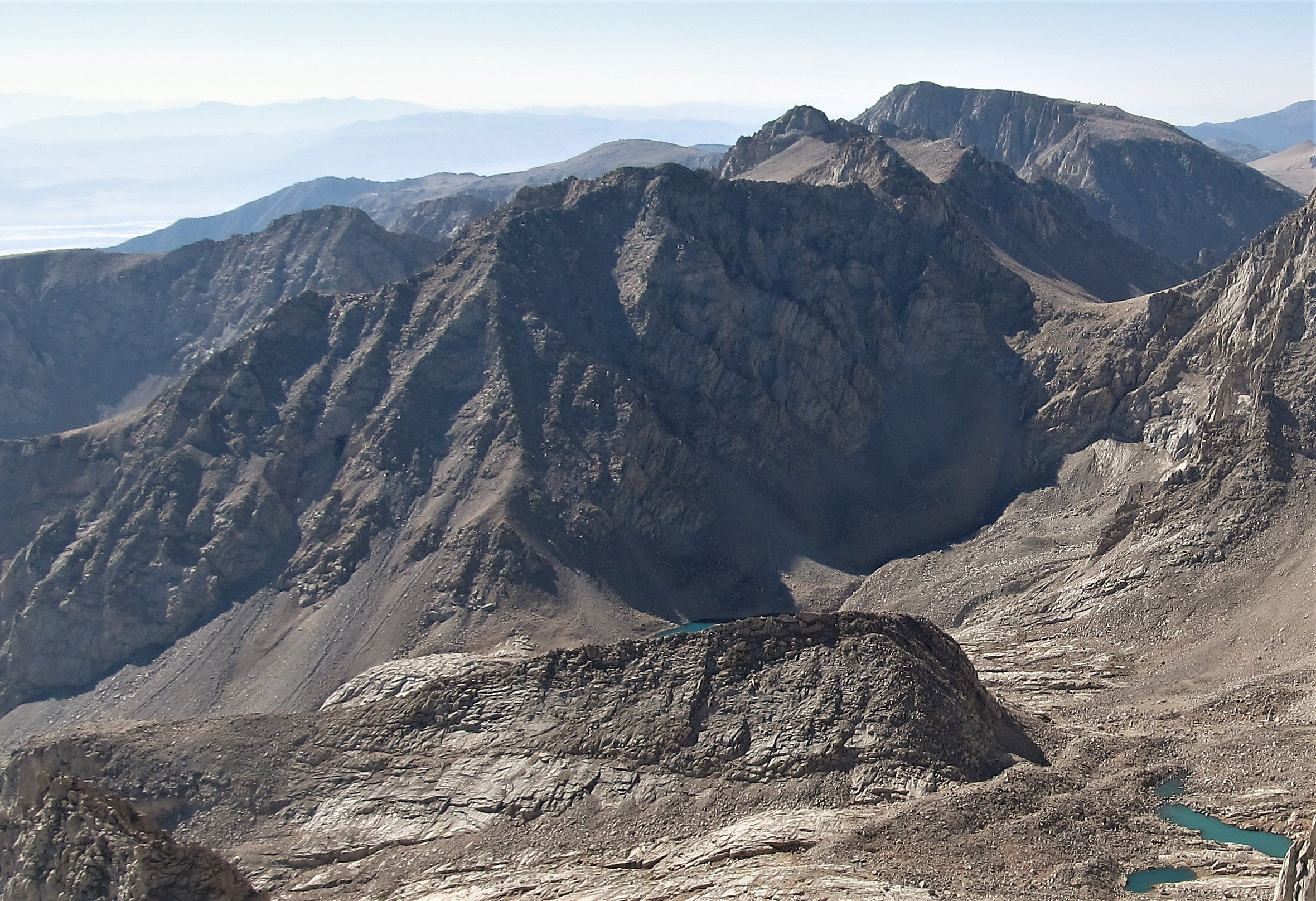
- Mt. Irvine centered, from Mt. Whitney

Highest point
- Elevation: 13,786+ ft (4222+ m) NAVD 88
- Prominence: 197 ft (60 m)
- Parent peak: Mount Mallory
- Listing: Sierra Peaks Section; Western States Climbers Emblem peak
- Coordinates: 36°33′21″N 118°15′49″W

Geography
- Location within California
- Location: Inyo County, California, U.S.
- Parent range: Sierra Nevada
- Topo map: USGS Mount Whitney

Climbing
- First ascent: 1925 by Norman Clyde
- Easiest route: Southeast Slope, class 2

Mount Irvine is a mountain in the Sierra Nevada of California. The summit is in the Inyo National Forest and the John Muir Wilderness. The peak was named in memory of Andrew Irvine, of the 1924 British Mount Everest expedition, who perished on Mount Everest, June, 1924. Norman Clyde proposed Irvine's and George H. Leigh Mallory's names following their loss after attaining the highest altitude reached by a mountaineer.

== Geography ==
Mount Irvine is located southeast of Mount Whitney, and is flanked to the south by Mount Mallory. The summit is a quarter mile east of the Sierra Crest, in Inyo County.

== Climbing ==
There are several routes typically used to climb Mount Irvine. The southeast slope, reached from Richins Pass, presents the most obvious route, but the mountain is often climbed in conjunction with Mount Mallory by way of a class 2 traverse.

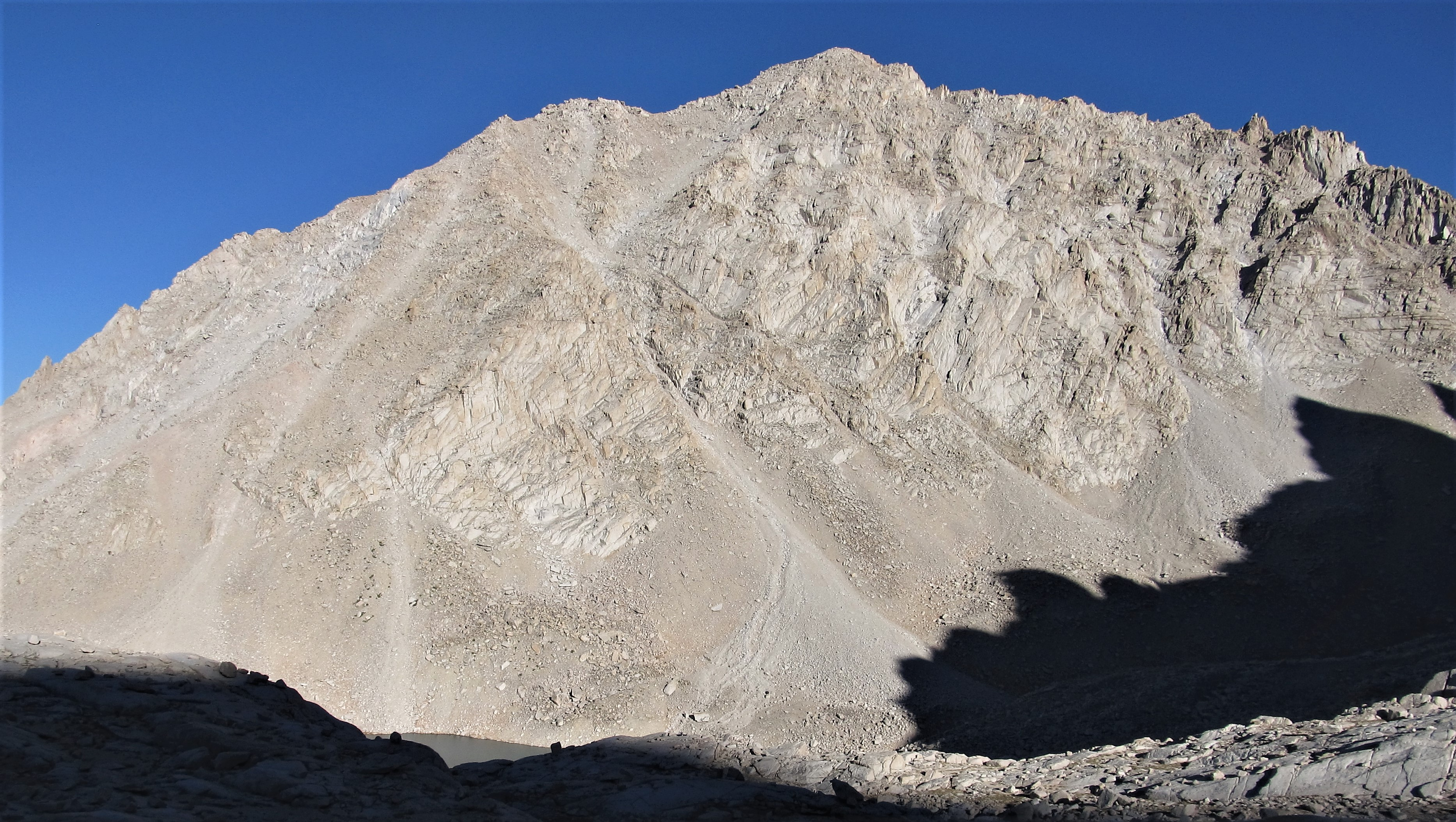
Northwest aspect, from Trail Camp

== See also ==
- Mountain peaks of California
