= Mount Young (California) =

Mountain in California, United States

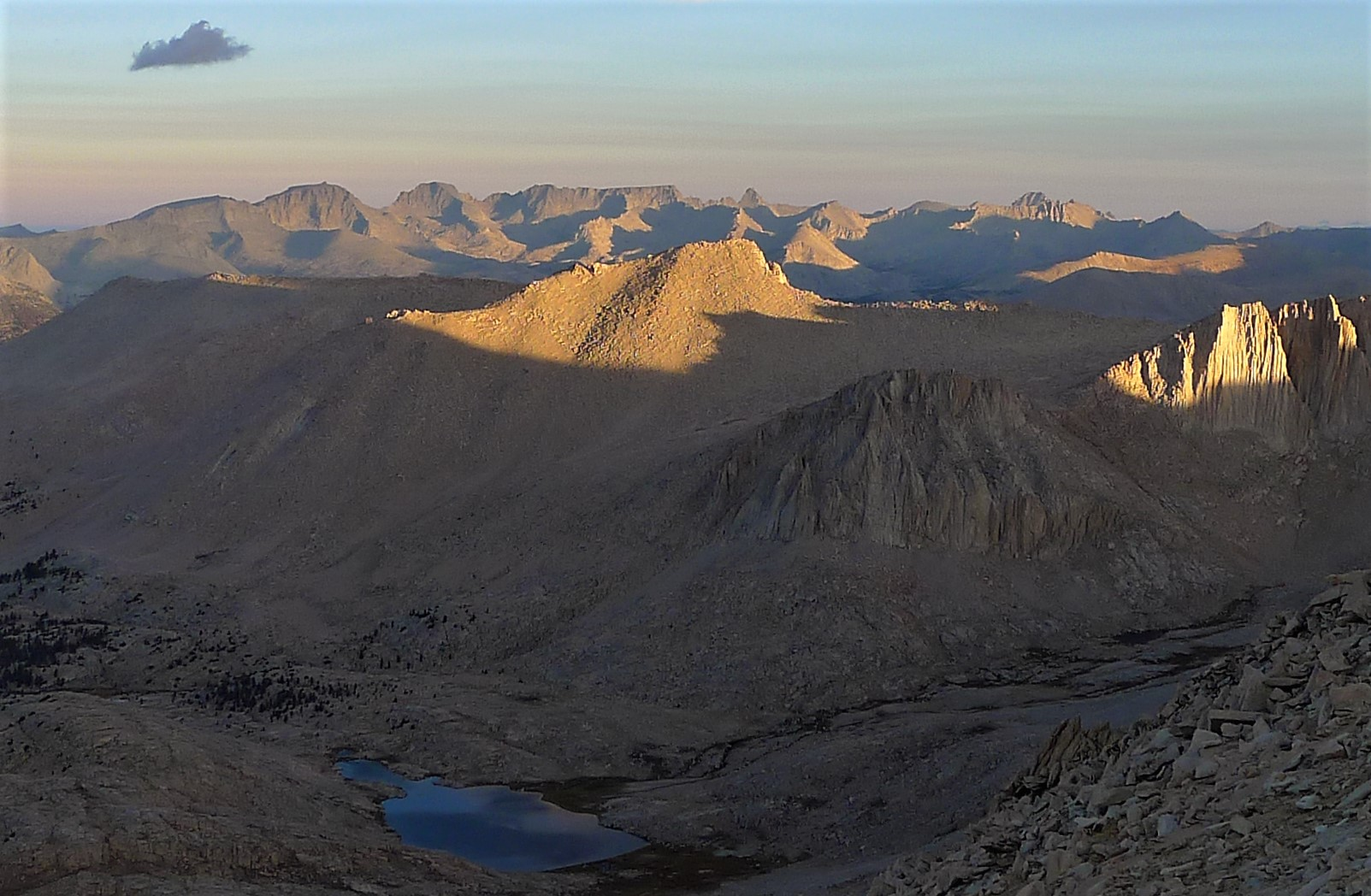
- Southeast aspect centered, at dawn

Highest point
- Elevation: 13,176 ft (4,016 m)
- Prominence: 381 ft (116 m)
- Parent peak: Mount Hale (13,494 ft)
- Isolation: 0.86 mi (1.38 km)
- Listing: Sierra Peaks Section
- Coordinates: 36°34′52″N 118°19′39″W

Naming
- Etymology: Charles Augustus Young

Geography
- Location within California Location within the United States
- Location: Sequoia National Park; Tulare County; California, U.S.
- Parent range: Sierra Nevada
- Topo map: USGS Mount Whitney

Geology
- Rock age: Cretaceous
- Mountain type: Fault block
- Rock type: granite

Climbing
- First ascent: September 7, 1881
- Easiest route: class 2 South slope

Mount Young is a 13,176-foot-elevation (4,016-meter) mountain summit located west of the crest of the Sierra Nevada mountain range in Tulare County, California. It is situated in Sequoia National Park, and is two miles (3.2 km) west of Mount Whitney, one mile northwest of Guitar Lake, and one mile southwest of Mount Hale, the nearest higher neighbor. The John Muir Trail traverses below the south and west aspects of the mountain, providing access. Topographic relief is significant as the southwest aspect rises 2,300 feet (700 meters) above Whitney Creek in approximately one mile. Mt. Young ranks as the 117th highest summit in California.

== History ==
In 1881, Rev. Frederick H. Wales of Tulare climbed Mount Young, where he left a record of its name, and the name of the peak south of it, for which he suggested the name "Mount Hitchcock." Wales Lake, one mile to the northeast of Mt. Young, was named after him. This mountain's name was officially adopted in 1909 by the U.S. Board on Geographic Names to honor the eminent American astronomer Charles Augustus Young (1834–1908). Young was teaching at Dartmouth College while Wales was a Dartmouth student (1872 graduate). The first ascent of the summit was made September 7, 1881, by Frederick H. Wales, William B. Wallace, and Captain James Wright. During the same month, Wales also made the first ascent of Mount Hitchcock and Mount Kaweah.

== Climate ==
According to the Köppen climate classification system, Mount Young has an alpine climate. Most weather fronts originate in the Pacific Ocean, and travel east toward the Sierra Nevada mountains. As fronts approach, they are forced upward by the peaks, causing them to drop their moisture in the form of rain or snowfall onto the range (orographic lift). Precipitation runoff from this mountain drains west to the Kern River via Wallace and Whitney Creeks.

== See also ==
- List of mountain peaks of California

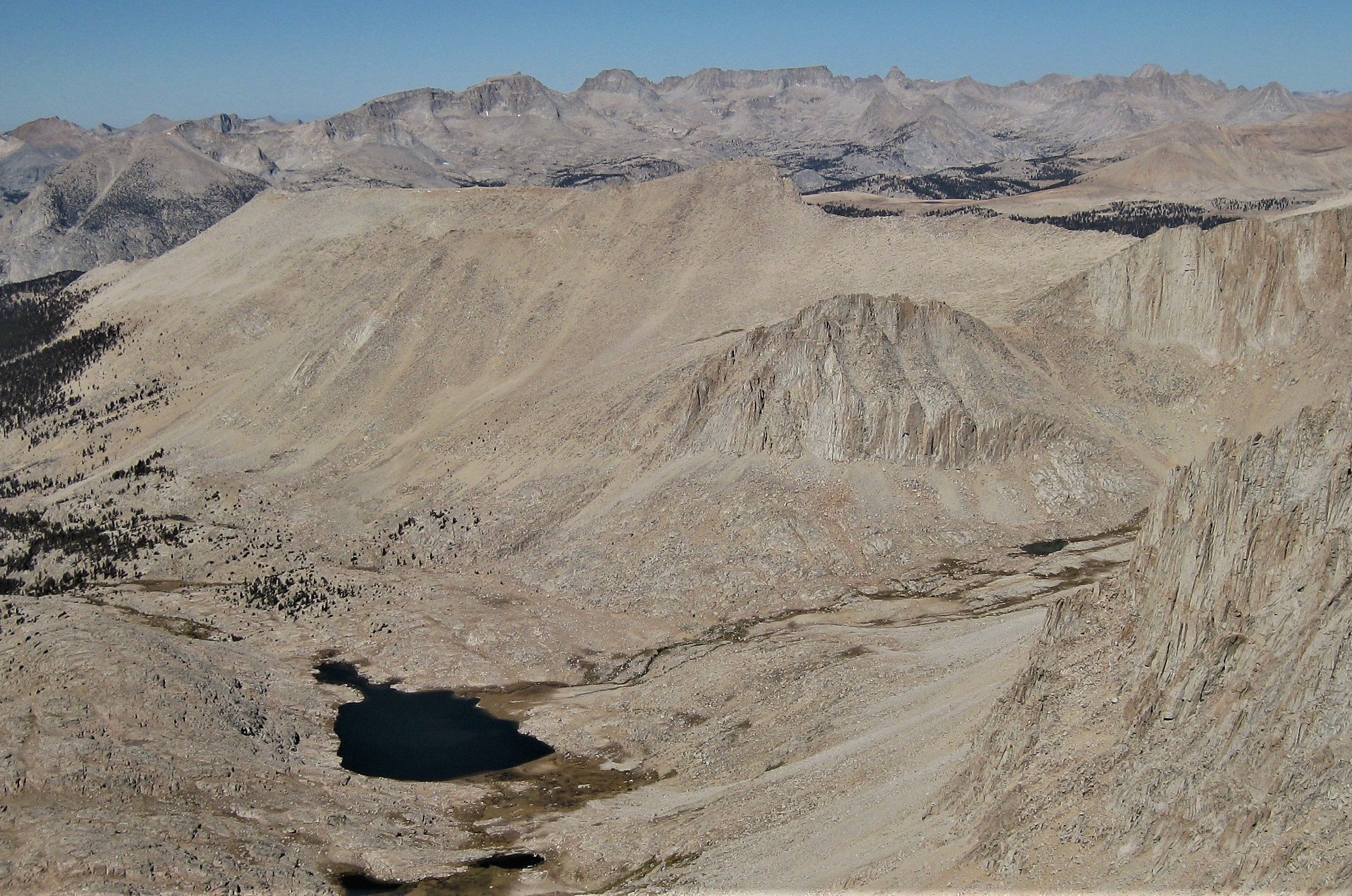
Mt. Young (centered) and Guitar Lake, from Mt. Whitney area
