= Mount Corcoran =

Mountain summit of the Sierra Nevada mountain range in California

- Corcoran Mountain
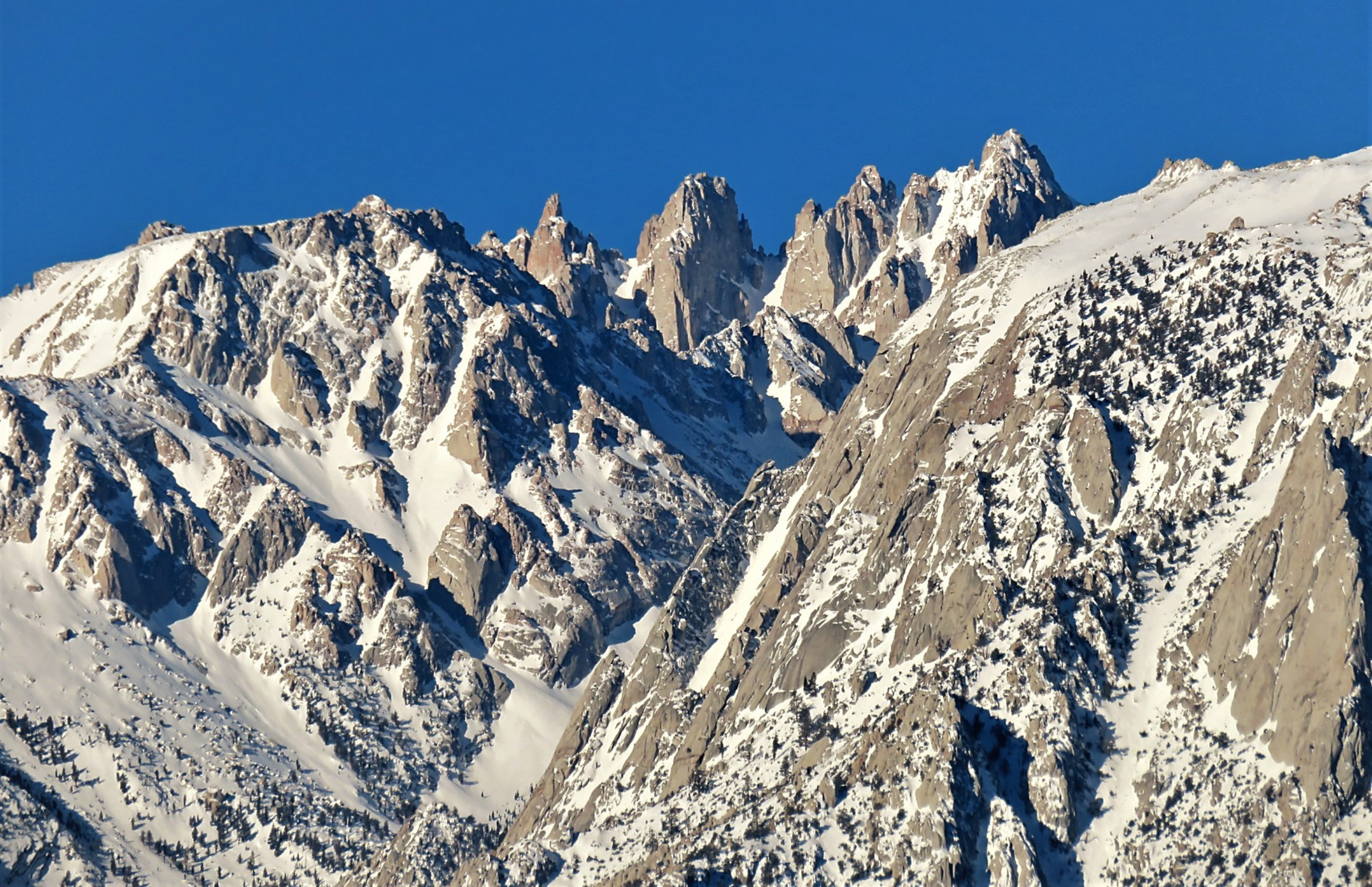
- East aspect centered. (Mt. Le Conte to right)

Highest point
- Elevation: 4,176 m (13,701 ft)
- Prominence: 197 ft (60 m)
- Parent peak: Mount Le Conte
- Listing: Sierra Peaks Section; Western States Climbers Star peak
- Coordinates: 36°32′19″N 118°15′02″W

Naming
- Etymology: William Wilson Corcoran

Geography
- Location within California Location within the United States
- Location: Sequoia National Park; John Muir Wilderness Area; Tulare / Inyo counties, California U.S.
- Parent range: Sierra Nevada
- Topo map: USGS Mount Langley

Geology
- Rock age: Cretaceous
- Mountain type: Fault block
- Rock type: Granitoid

Climbing
- First ascent: 1933 by Howard S. Gates
- Easiest route: Scramble (class 2–3)

Mount Corcoran is a 13,701-foot (4,176 m) mountain summit located on the crest of the Sierra Nevada mountain range in California. It is situated on the boundary between Tulare County and Inyo County, as well as the boundary between Sequoia National Park and John Muir Wilderness. It is 12 miles (19 km) west-southwest of the community of Lone Pine, 3.6 miles (5.8 km) southeast of Mount Whitney, 1.2 miles (1.9 km) northwest of Mount Langley, and 0.23 miles (0.37 km) immediately south of Mount Le Conte, the nearest higher neighbor. Topographic relief is significant as it rises approximately 1,800 feet (550 meters) above Iridescent Lake in one-half mile.

== Climate ==
According to the Köppen climate classification system, Mount Corcoran has an alpine climate. Most weather fronts originate in the Pacific Ocean, and travel east toward the Sierra Nevada mountains. As fronts approach, they are forced upward by the peaks, causing them to drop their moisture in the form of rain or snowfall onto the range (orographic lift). Precipitation runoff from this mountain drains west to the Kern River via Rock Creek, and east to Owens Valley via Tuttle Creek.

== History ==
The mountain known today as Mount Langley was named Mount Corcoran in 1868 by artistic painter Albert Bierstadt in honor of William Wilson Corcoran (1839–1923), an American banker, philanthropist, and art collector. 1891 and 1933 decision descriptions by the United States Board on Geographic Names placed the Corcoran name at what is now known as Mount Langley. A 1968 board decision officially applied the Mount Corcoran name to the highest and northernmost of four pinnacles on the ridge immediately south of Mount Le Conte and north of Mt. Langley.

The first ascent of the summit was made in 1933 by Howard S. Gates.

== Gallery ==
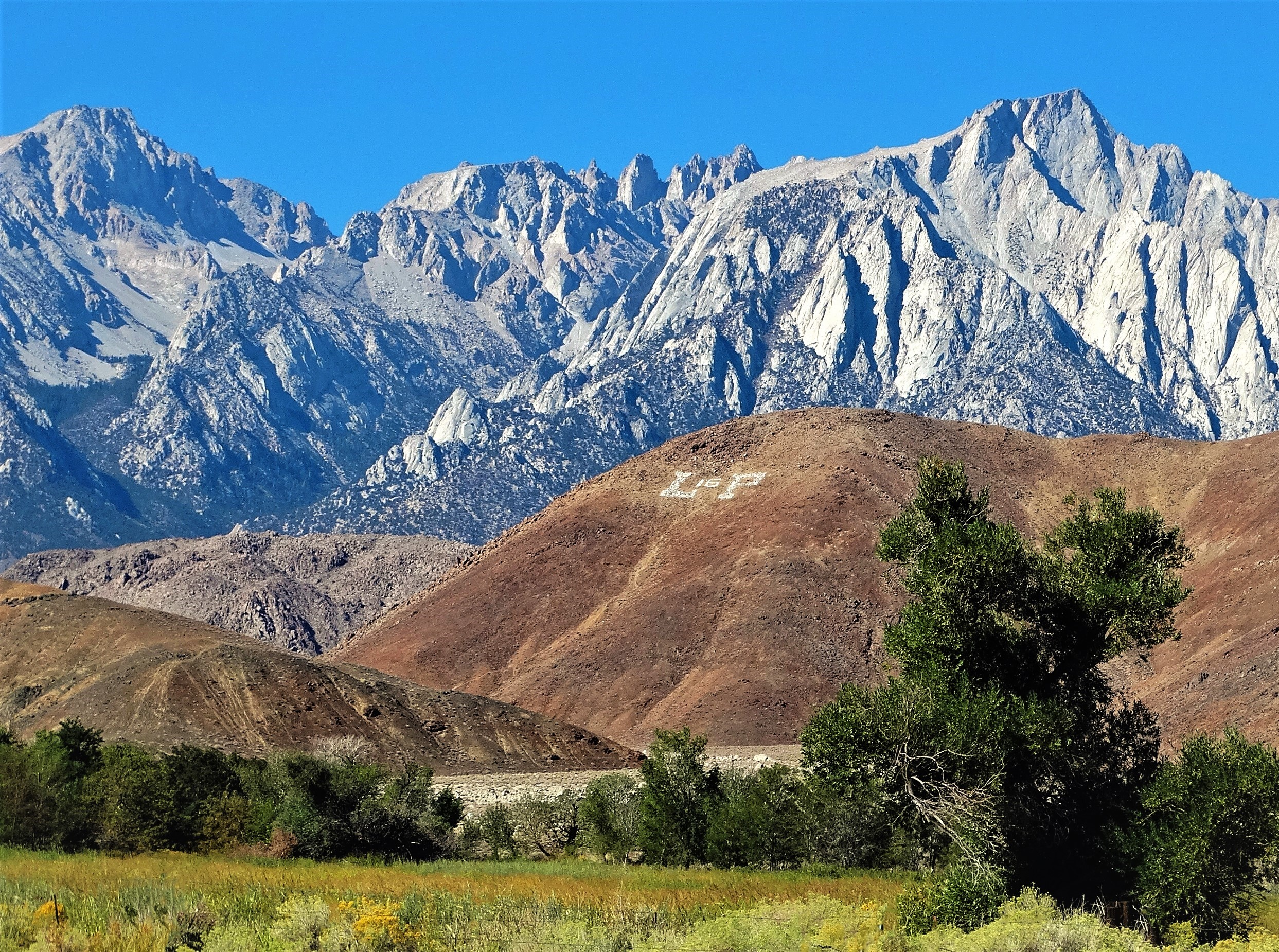
Left to rightː Mt. Langley, Mt. Corcoran (centered), Mt. LeConte, Lone Pine Peak.

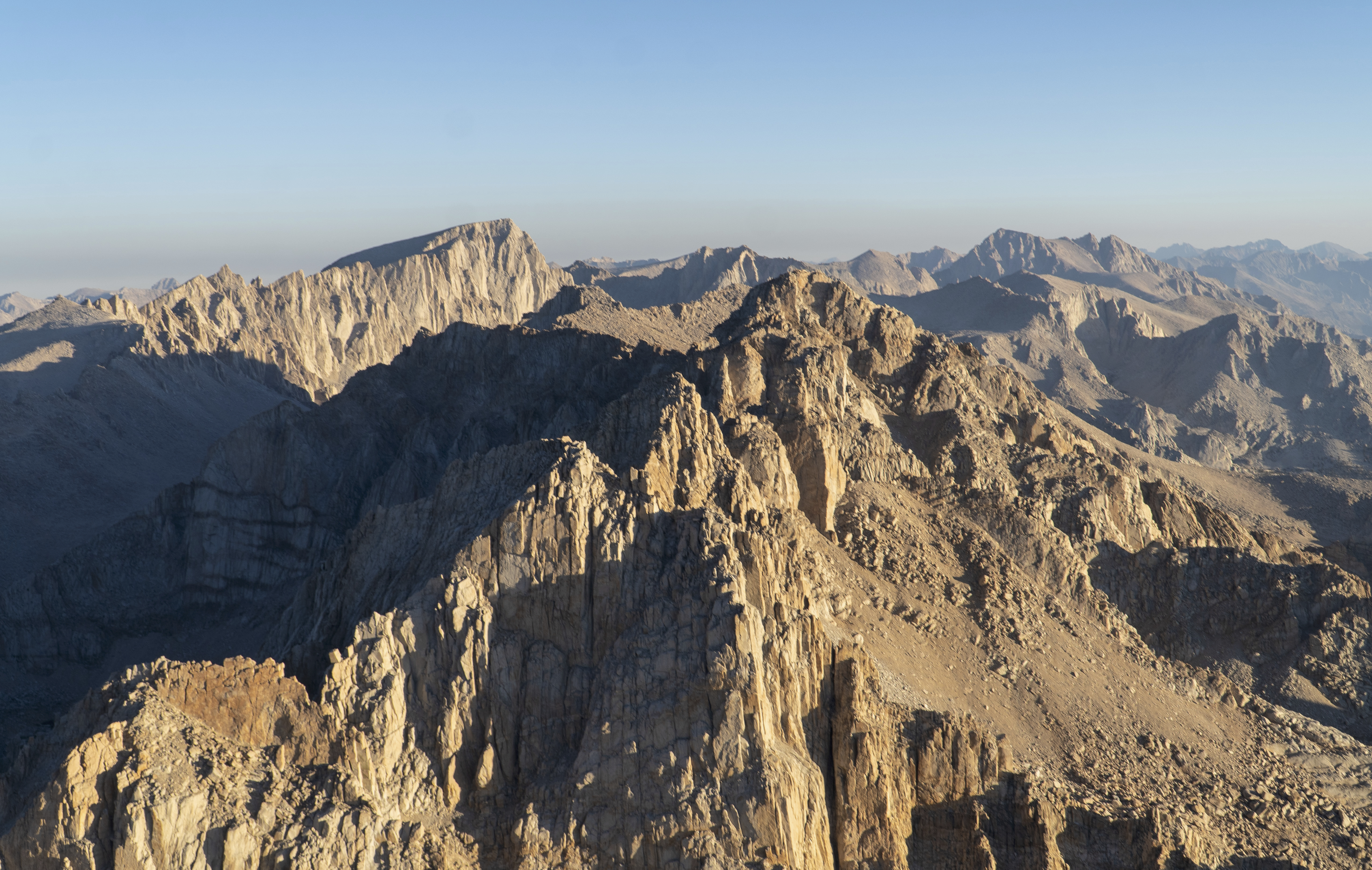
Mts. Corcoran / Le Conte centered, seen from Mt. Langley.
(Mount Whitney upper left).

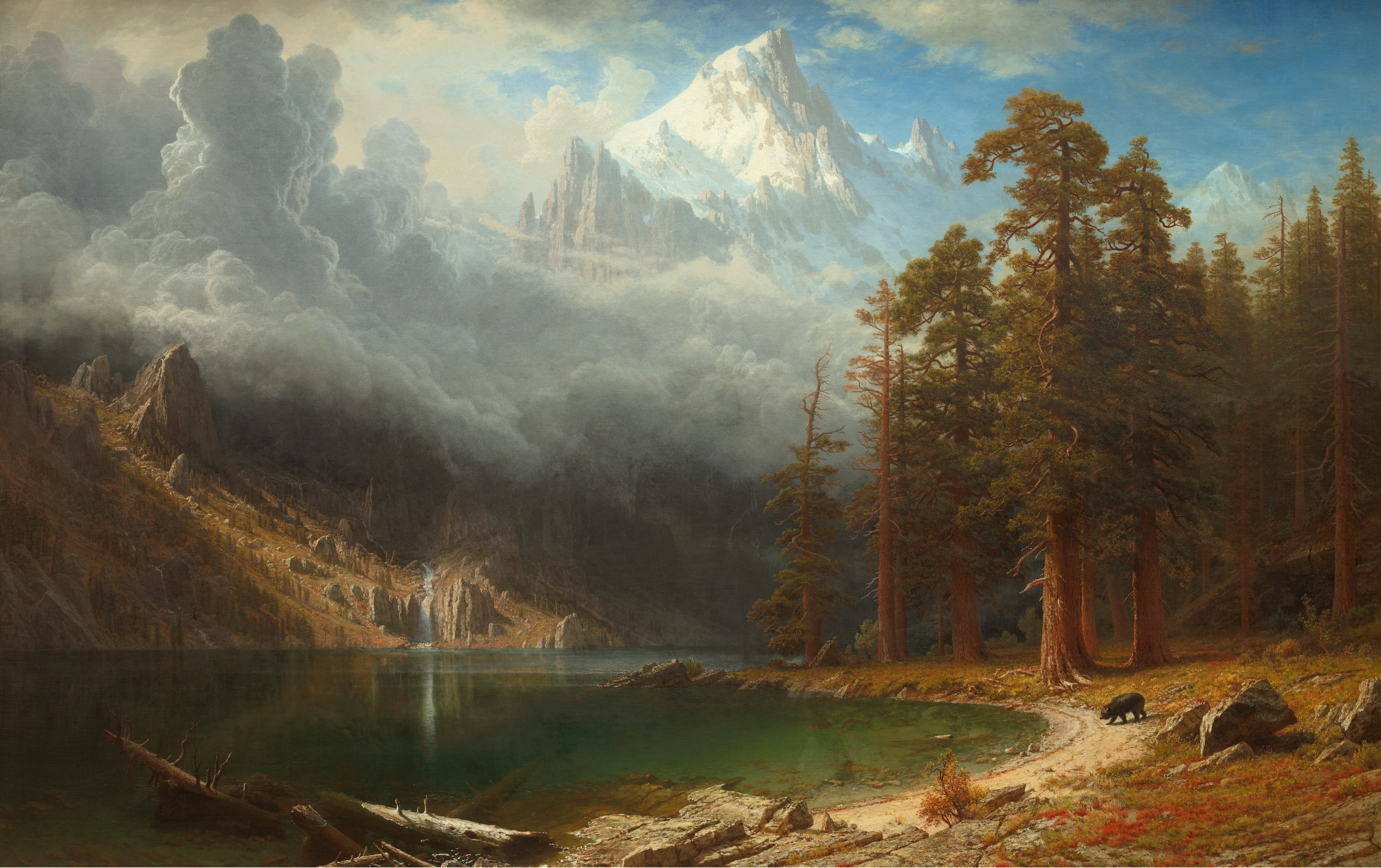
Albert Bierstadt's painting, "Mount Corcoran", circa 1876–1877, is a composite of locations that he visited in the Sierras.

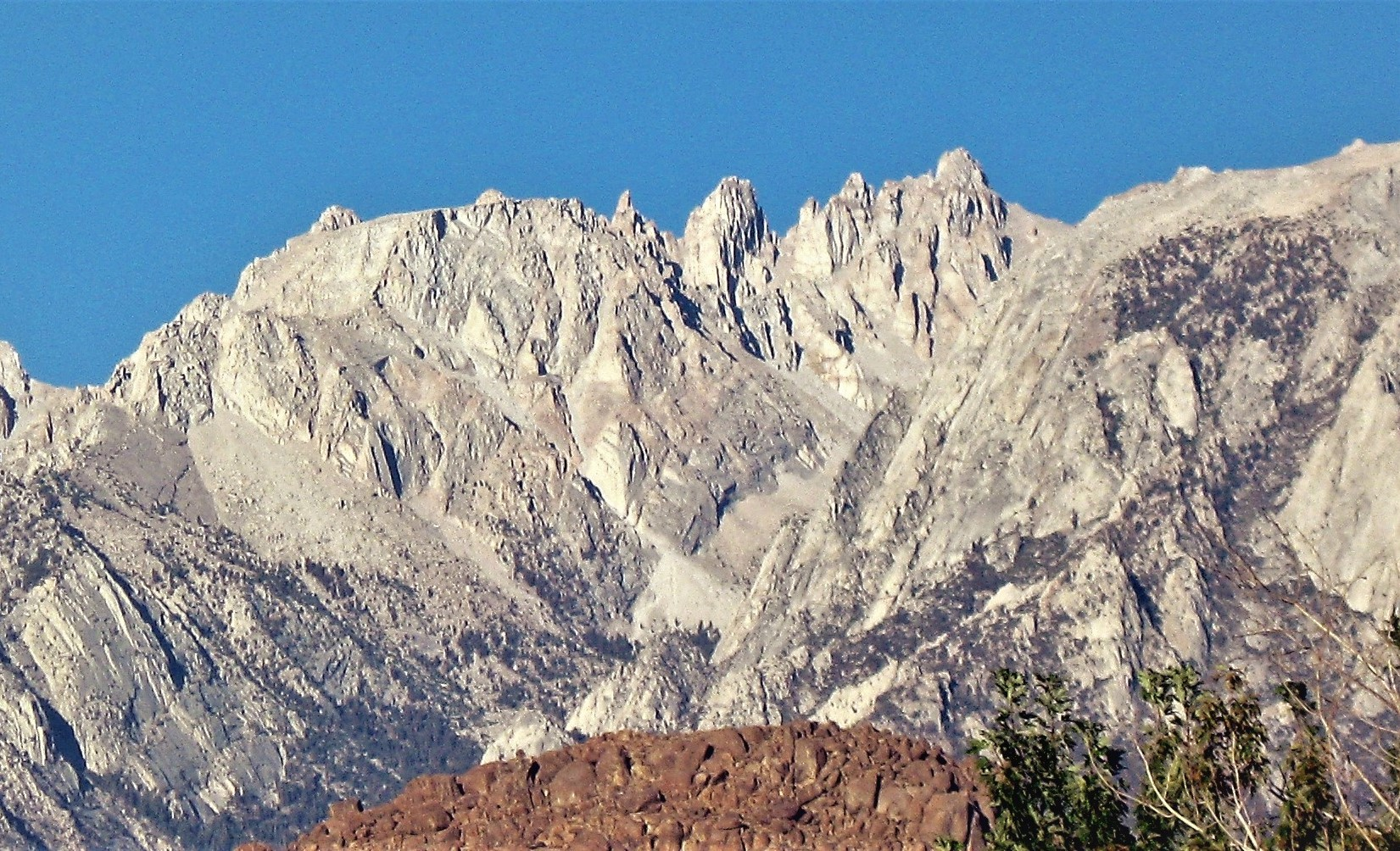
Corcoran (centered), and Le Conte

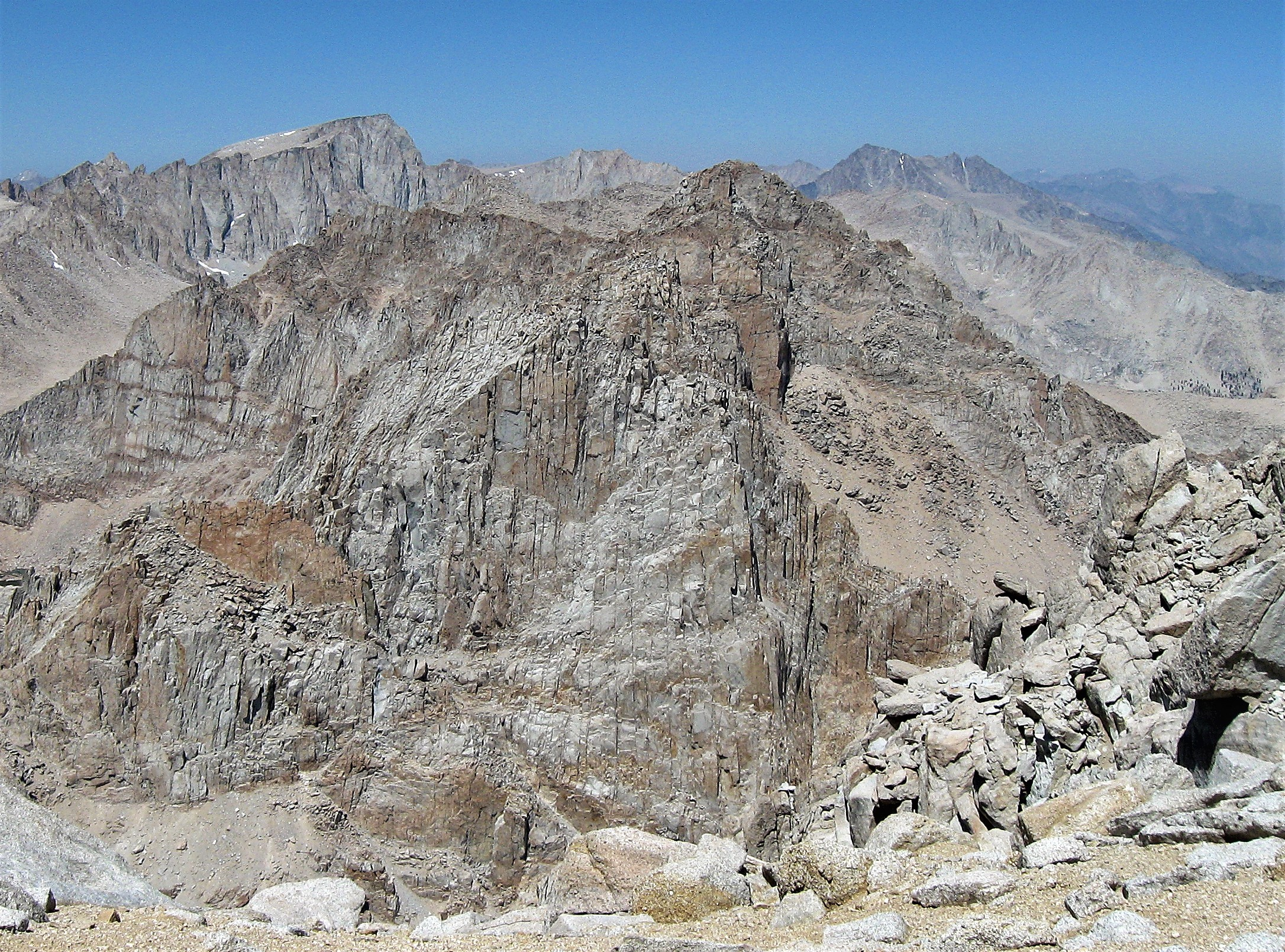
Mts. Corcoran / Le Conte centered, seen from Mt. Langley.
(Mount Whitney upper left).

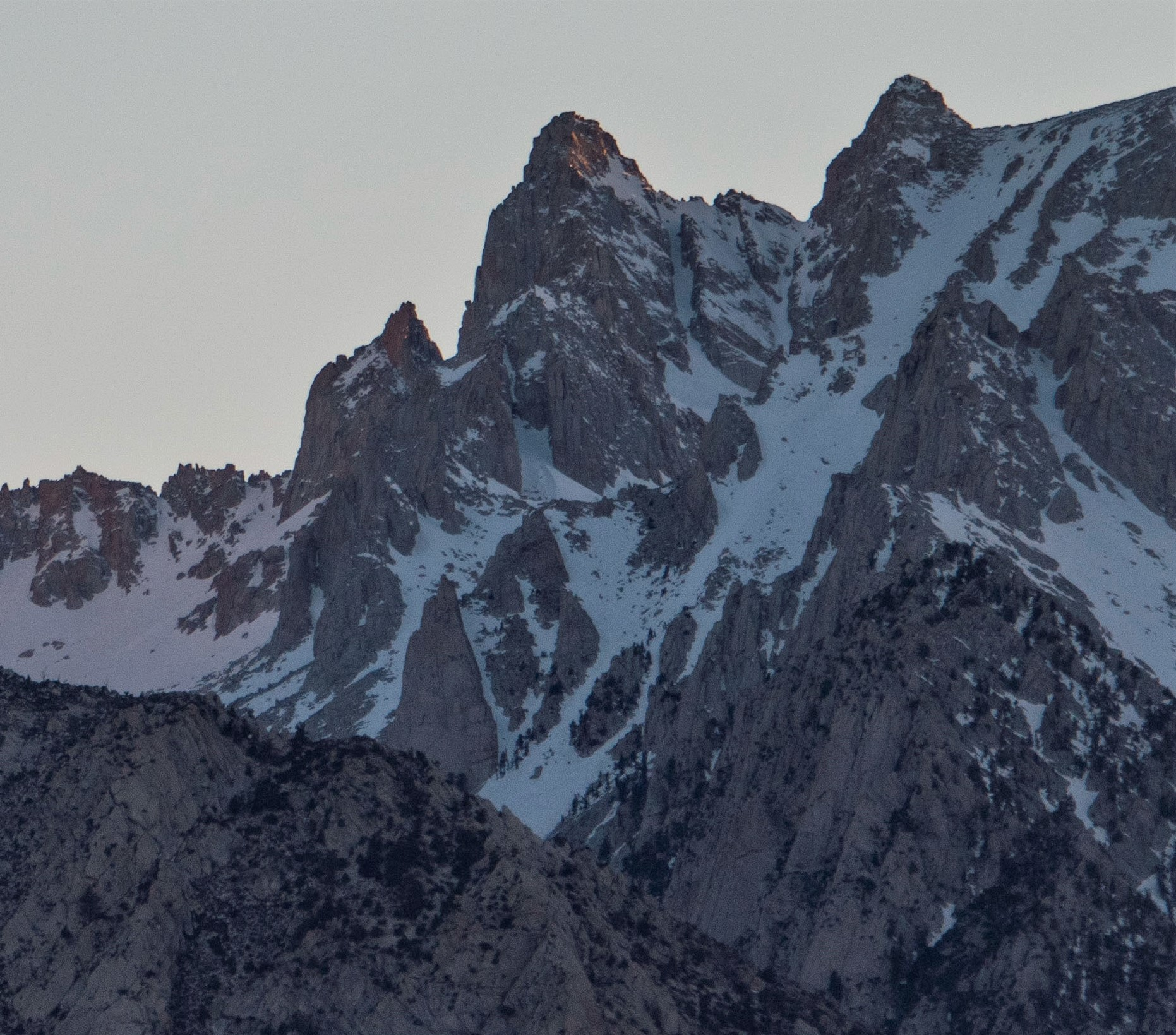
Corcoran's southernmost peak

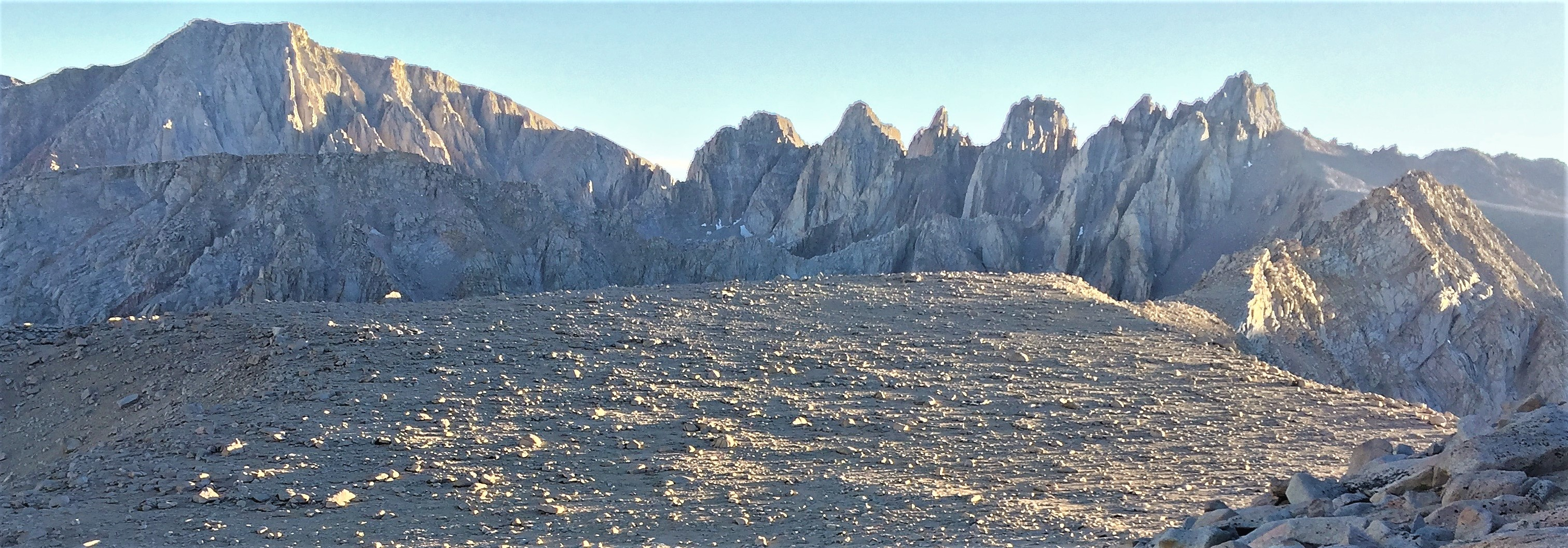
Mount Langley (left), Mount Corcoran, and Mt. LeConte (right) seen from Lone Pine Peak area.

== See also ==
- List of mountain peaks of California
