= Mount Chamberlin (California) =

Mountain summit in Tulare County, California

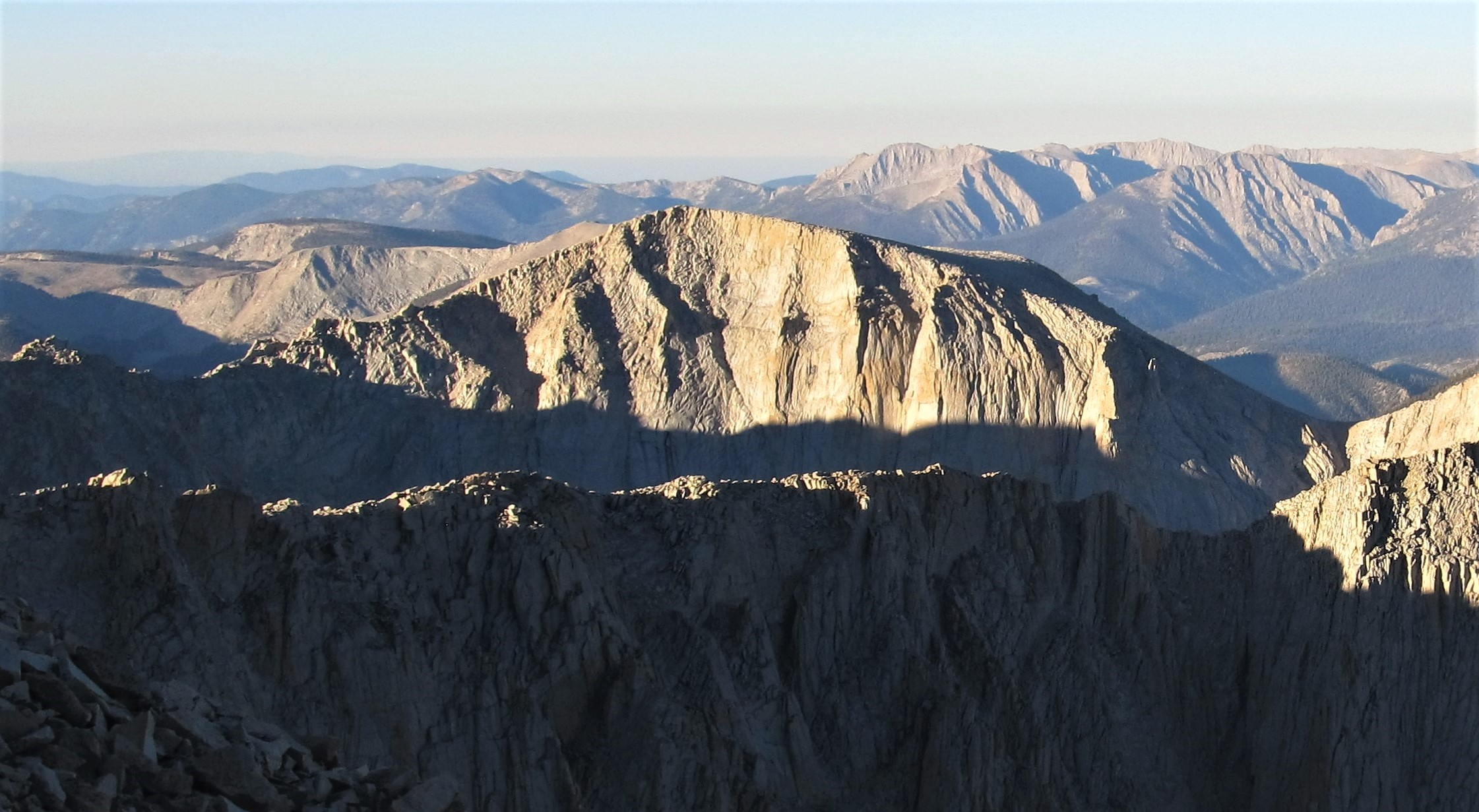
- Northeast aspect from Trail Crest

Highest point
- Elevation: 13,169 ft (4,014 m)
- Prominence: 374 ft (114 m)
- Parent peak: Mount Newcomb (13,422 ft)
- Isolation: 1.07 mi (1.72 km)
- Listing: Sierra Peaks Section
- Coordinates: 36°32′01″N 118°18′38″W

Naming
- Etymology: Thomas Chrowder Chamberlin

Geography
- Location within California Location within the United States
- Location: Sequoia National Park; Tulare County; California, U.S.
- Parent range: Sierra Nevada
- Topo map: USGS Mount Whitney

Geology
- Rock age: Cretaceous
- Mountain type: Fault block
- Rock type: granitic

Climbing
- First ascent: < 1932, J. H. Czock
- Easiest route: class 2 West or south slopes

Mount Chamberlin is a 13,169-foot-elevation (4,014-meter) mountain summit located west of the crest of the Sierra Nevada mountain range in Tulare County, California. It is situated in Sequoia National Park, and is 3.2 miles (5.1 km) south-southwest of Mount Whitney, 1.5 miles (2.4 km) south of Mount Hitchcock, and 3.5 miles west of Mount Corcoran. Topographic relief is significant as it rises approximately 1,830 feet (560 meters) above Crabtree Lakes in one-half mile. Mt. Chamberlin ranks as the 119th highest summit in California. This mountain's name was officially adopted in 1940 by the U.S. Board on Geographic Names to honor American geologist Thomas Chrowder Chamberlin (1843–1928). The first ascent of the summit was made by Sierra Club member J. H. Czock, date unknown.

== Climbing ==
Established climbing routes:

- South and West Slopes – class 2 – 1932 by J.N. Holladay, E.M. Holladay, H.E. Fritsche
- East Ridge – class 3 – 1956 by George O. Hale
- North Pillar – class 5.10 – 1979 by Galen Rowell, Mike Farrell
- North Face – class 5.10d – 1983 by Claude Fiddler, Bob Harrington
- Eastern Pillar of the North Face – class 5.11 – 1992 by Julie Brugger, Andy de Klerk
- Asleep at the Wheel – class 5.11 – 2001 by Jimmy Haden, Mike Pennings

== Climate ==
According to the Köppen climate classification system, Mount Chamberlin has an alpine climate. Most weather fronts originate in the Pacific Ocean, and travel east toward the Sierra Nevada mountains. As fronts approach, they are forced upward by the peaks, causing them to drop their moisture in the form of rain or snowfall onto the range (orographic lift). Precipitation runoff from this mountain drains west to the Kern River via Whitney and Rock Creeks.

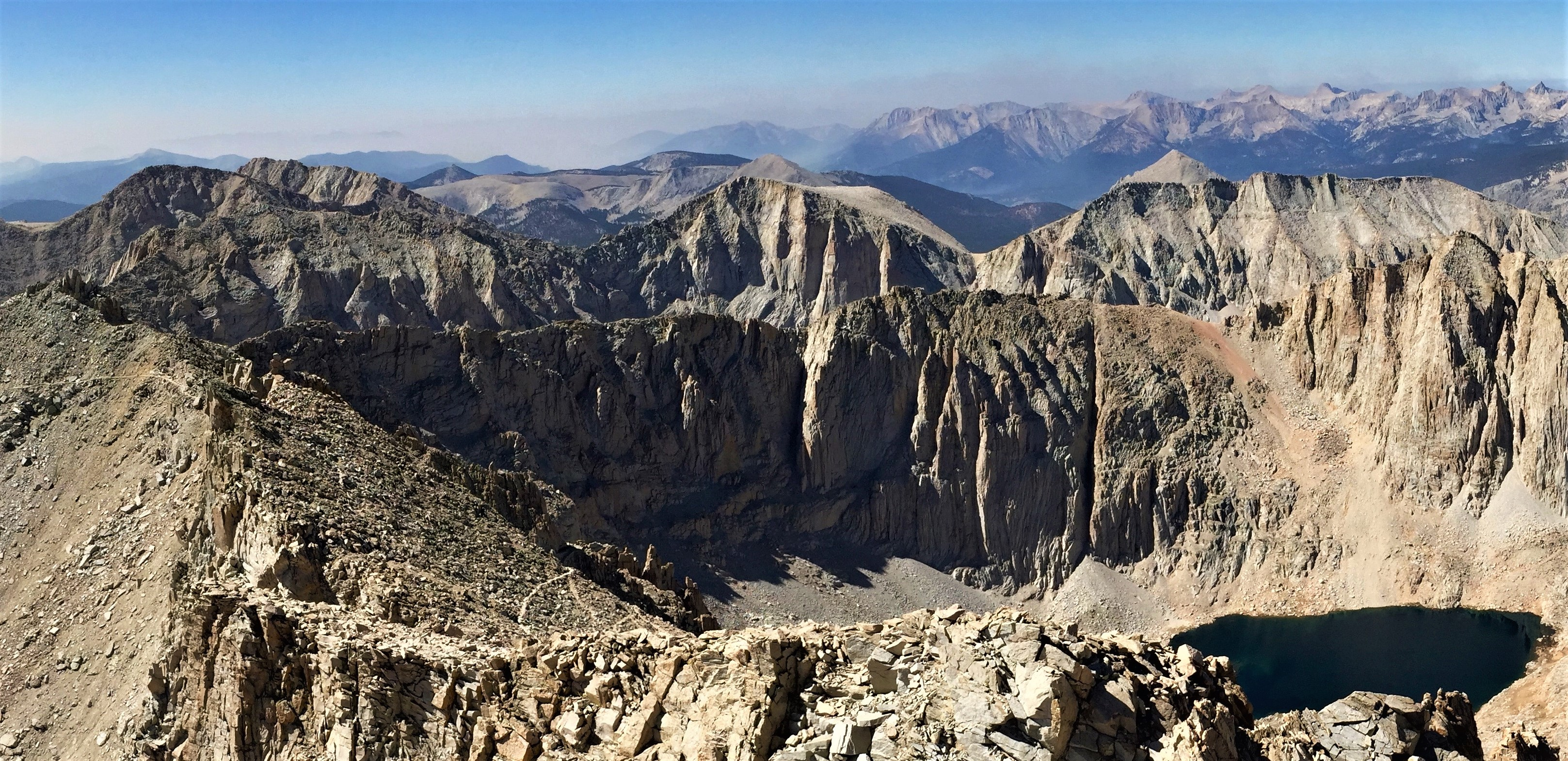
Mts. Pickering, Chamberlin (center), Hitchcock

== See also ==
- List of mountain peaks of California
