= Taboose Pass =

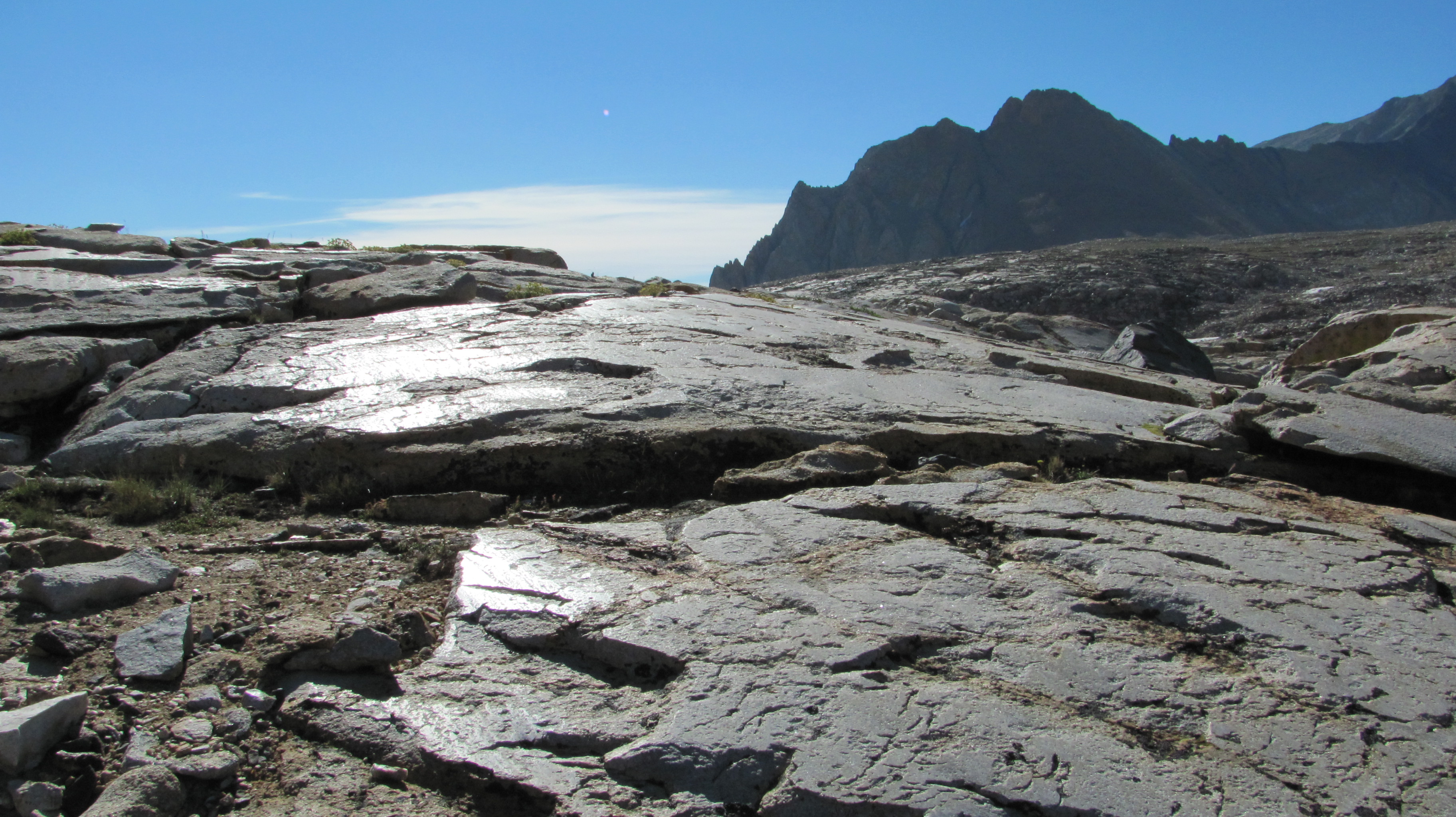
- Glacial striations at Taboose Pass
- Interactive map of Taboose Pass
- Elevation: 11,417 ft (3,480 m)
- Traversed by: Taboose Pass Trail

Third Approach
- Location: Inyo and Fresno Counties, California
- Range: Sierra Nevada
- Coordinates: 36°59′05″N 118°24′50″W

Taboose Pass, 11,417 ft (3,480 m), also known as Wide Gap, is a mountain pass in the southern Sierra Nevada, California on the border of the Inyo National Forest (John Muir Wilderness) to the east and Kings Canyon National Park to the west. The pass is reachable from the east via a long, strenuous hike from the desert floor of the Owens Valley. On the west, it connects to the Pacific Crest Trail/John Muir Trail in the National Park.

Taboose Pass is one of the more difficult Eastern Sierra passes in the Sierra Nevada range, partly due to the low starting elevation of the Owens Valley Trailhead in a desert floor, at 5,500 feet. From the trailhead it is an 8-mile hike, gaining 6,000 feet over that distance to reach the pass at 11,400 feet. Some notable peaks near Taboose Pass include: Split Mountain (the southernmost fourteener in the Palisades group), Cardinal Mountain, Crater Mountain, Goodale Mountain, Mount Ickes, Marion Peak, Mount Pinchot, Mount Ruskin, Striped Mountain, Striped South, Vennacher Needle, White Mountain (at 12,828', not to be confused with the California fourteener with the same name), and Mount Wynne.
