= Mount Tinemaha =

Mountain in California, United States

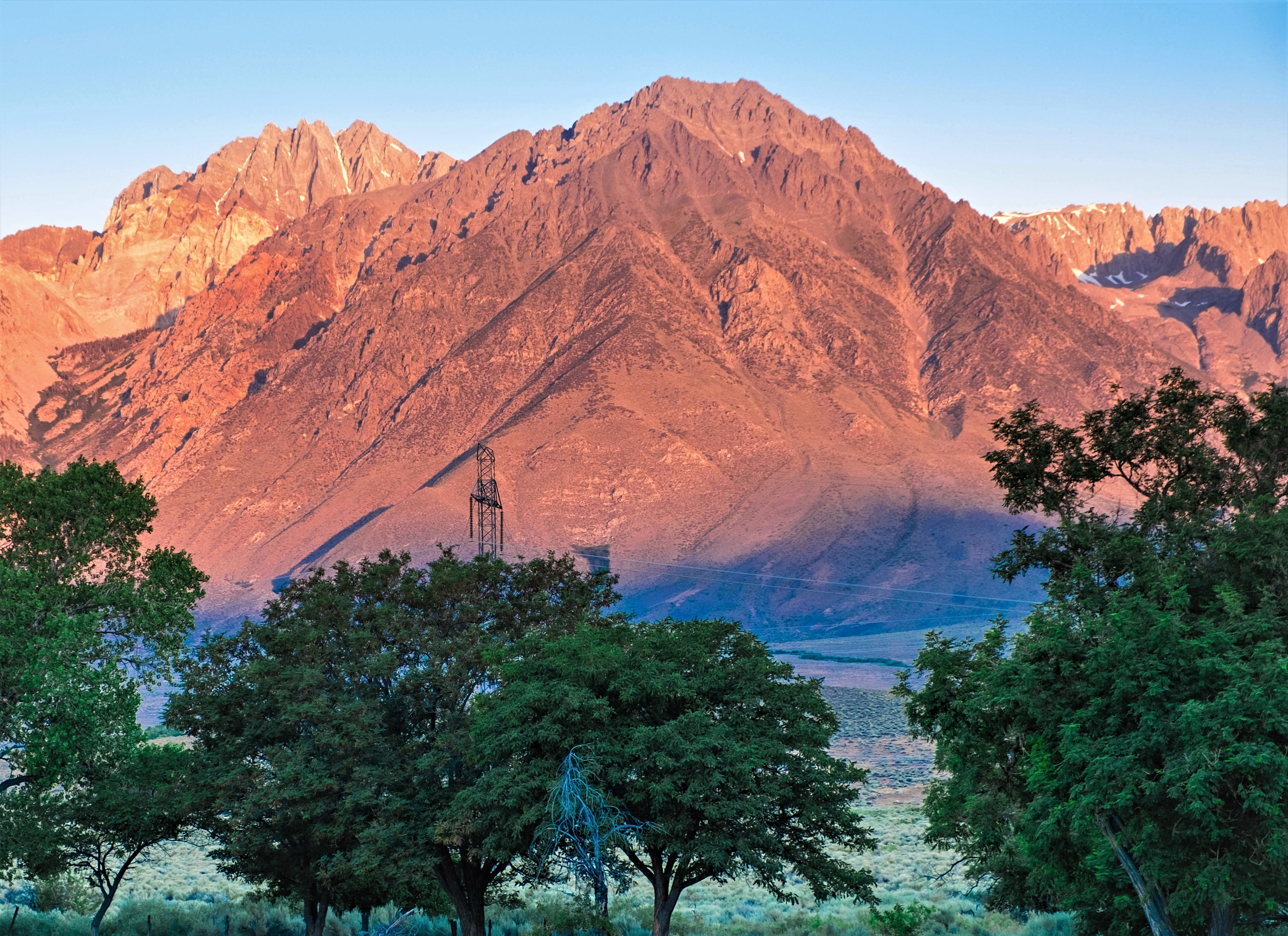
- East aspect at sunrise (Split Mountain behind left)

Highest point
- Elevation: 12,520 ft (3,820 m)
- Prominence: 545 ft (166 m)
- Parent peak: Split Mountain (14,058 ft)
- Isolation: 1.80 mi (2.90 km)
- Listing: Sierra Peaks Section
- Coordinates: 37°02′11″N 118°23′47″W

Geography
- Location within California Location within the United States
- Location: Inyo County, California, U.S.
- Parent range: Sierra Nevada
- Topo map: USGS Split Mountain

Climbing
- First ascent: 1937
- Easiest route: class 2 West Ridge

Mount Tinemaha is a 12,520-foot-elevation (3,820-meter) mountain summit located east of the crest of the Sierra Nevada mountain range, in Inyo County of northern California. It is situated on the eastern boundary of the John Muir Wilderness, on land managed by Inyo National Forest. It is 1.3 mile southeast of Tinemaha Lake, and 1.8 mile northeast of parent Split Mountain. Topographic relief is significant as the east aspect rises 5,900 feet (1,800 meters) above Owens Valley in two miles.

== History ==
This mountain's name was officially adopted in 1937 by the U.S. Board on Geographic Names to honor the legendary Paiute chief, Tinemaha. The peak was known by this name to the early prospectors and cattlemen of Owens Valley. The first ascent of the summit was made July 1, 1937, by Chester Versteeg, a prominent Sierra Club member. Chester Versteeg submitted the name to the board for consideration.

== Climate ==
According to the Köppen climate classification system, Mount Tinemaha has an alpine climate. Most weather fronts originate in the Pacific Ocean, and travel east toward the Sierra Nevada mountains. As fronts approach, they are forced upward by the peaks, causing them to drop their moisture in the form of rain or snowfall onto the range (orographic lift). Precipitation runoff from this mountain drains to Red Mountain Creek and Tinemaha Creek, thence Tinemaha Reservoir.

== Gallery ==
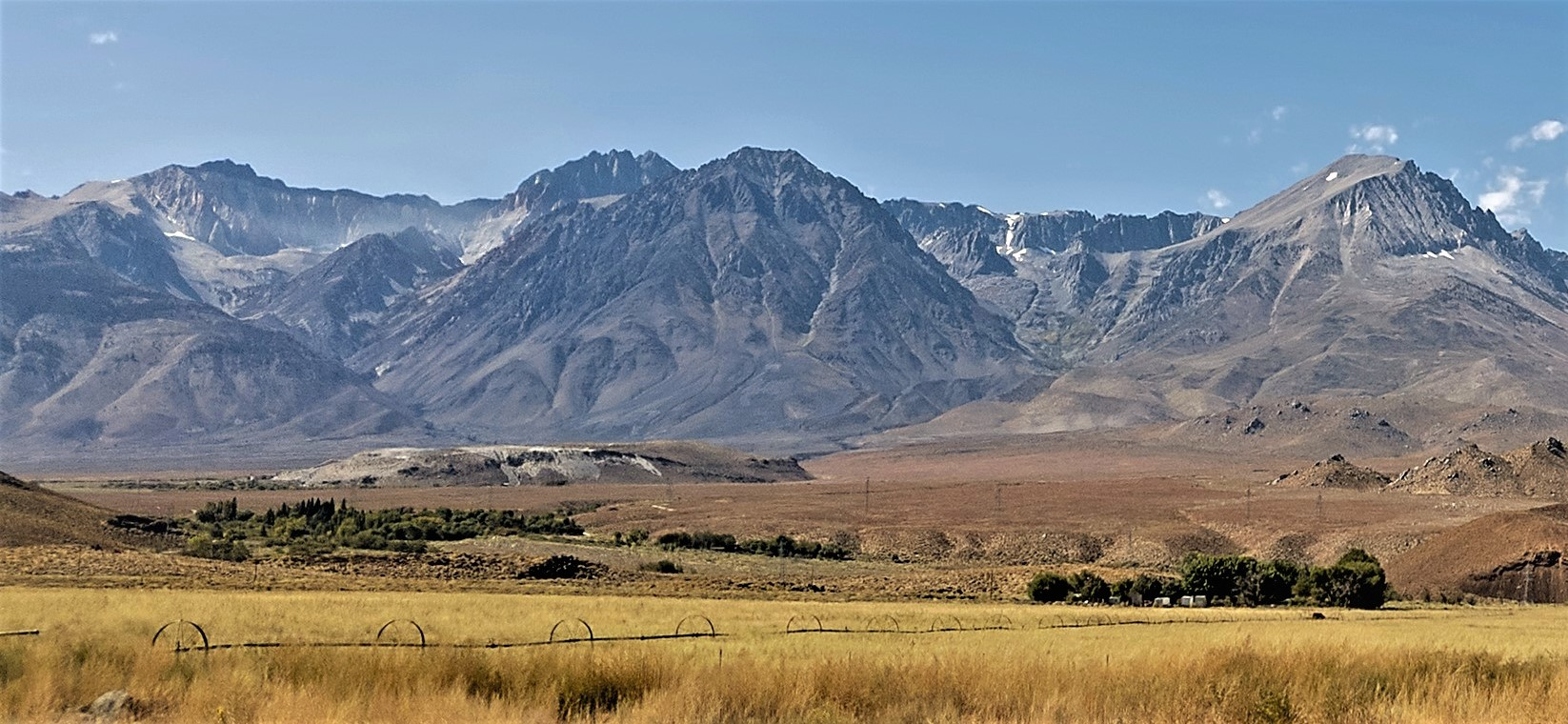
Cardinal Mountain, Split Mountain, Mt. Tinemaha, Birch Mountain from east

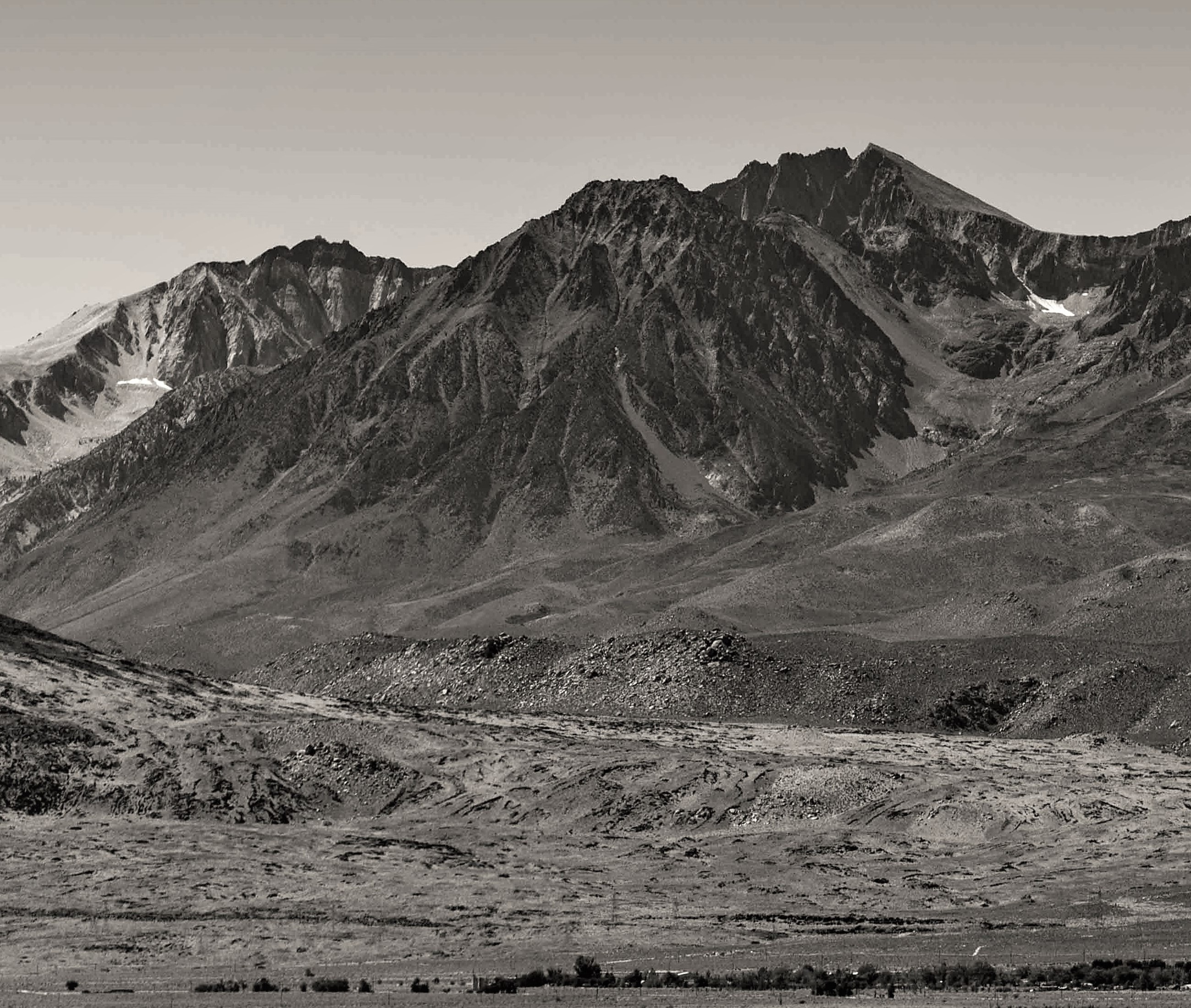
Tinemaha centered, Cardinal Mountain (left), Split Mountain (right)

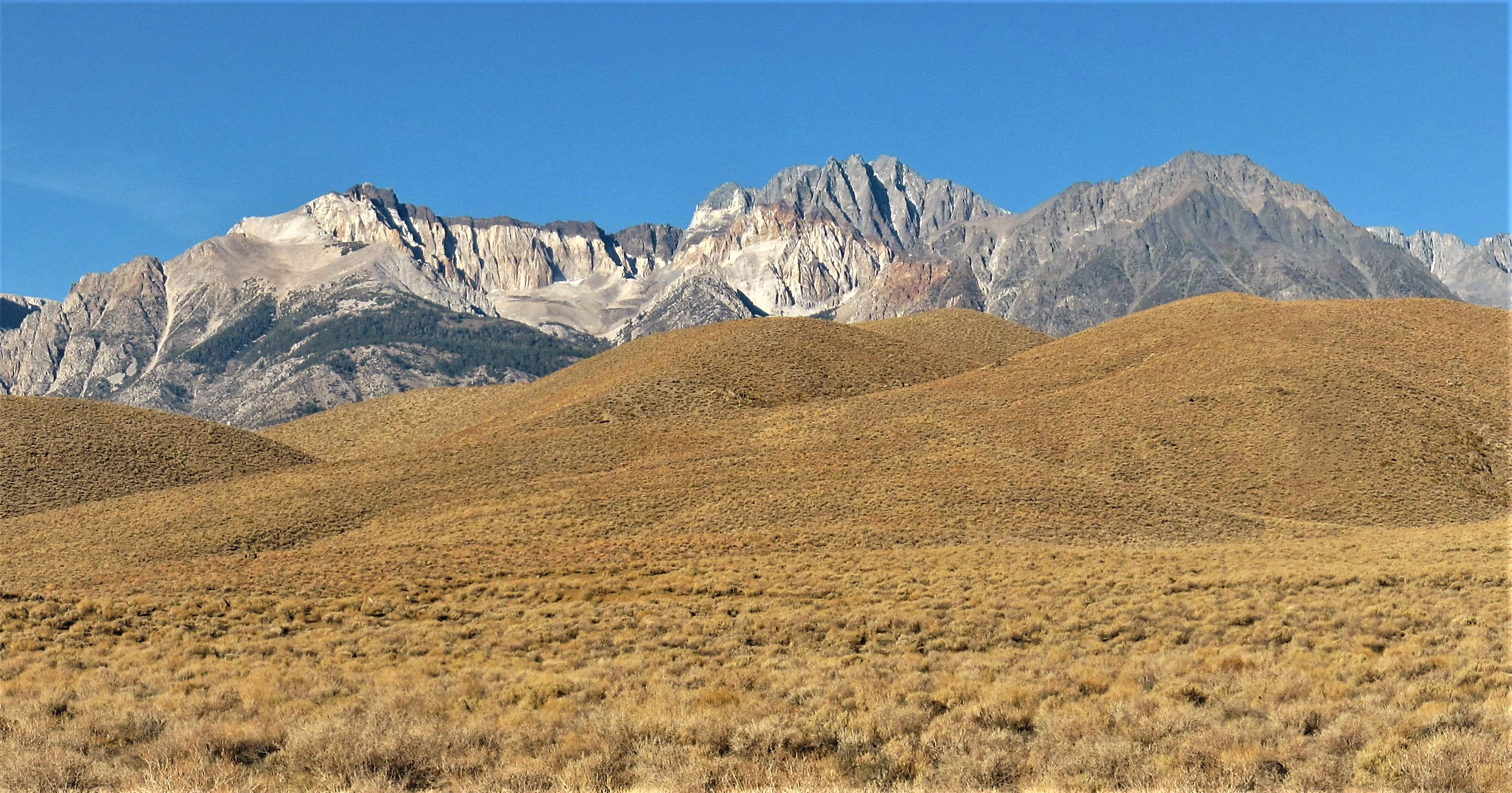
Cardinal Mountain (left), Split Mountain, Mount Tinemaha (right), from Highway 395

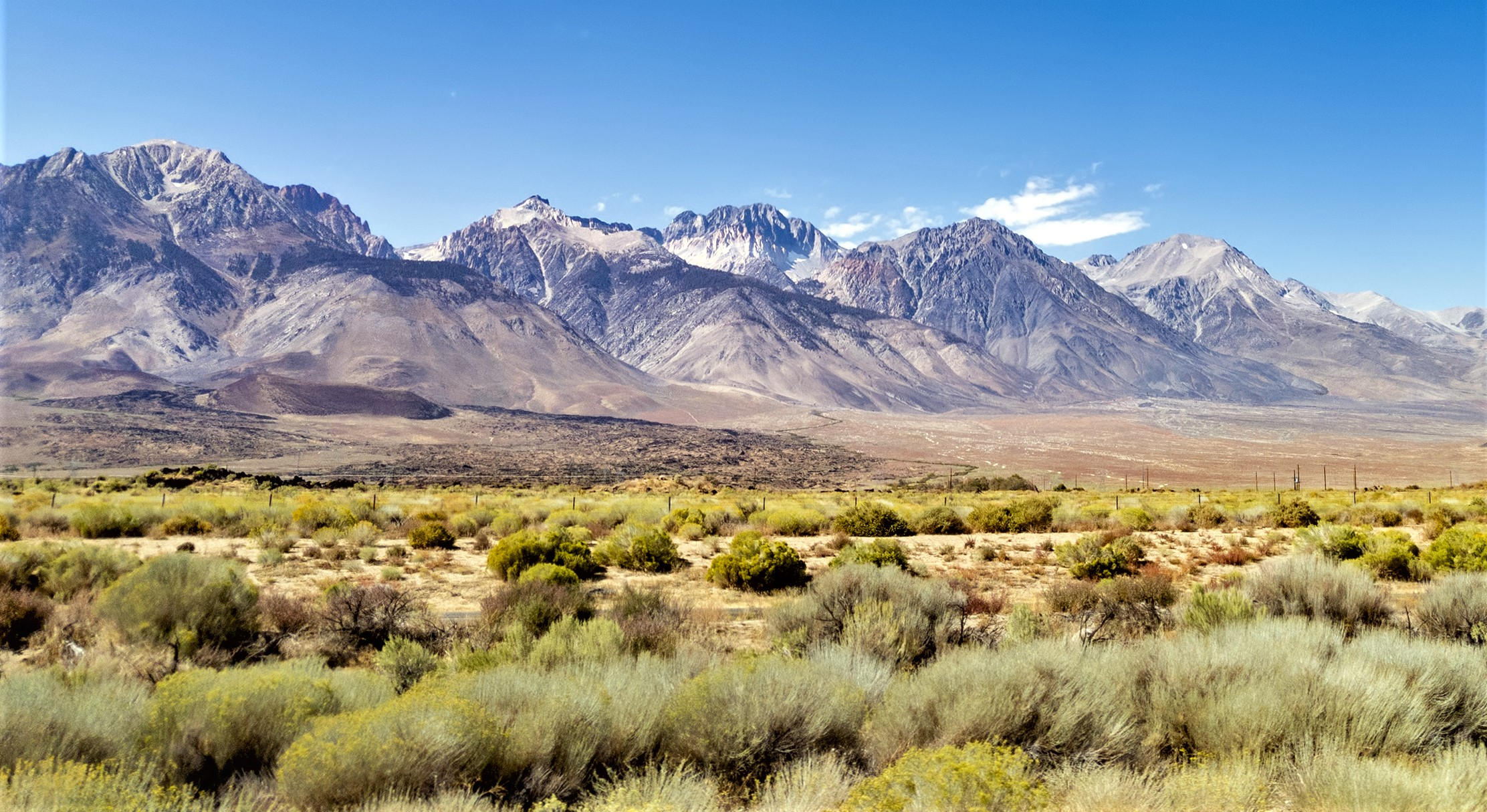
From left to rightː Goodale, Cardinal, Split, Tinemaha, Birch.

== See also ==
- List of mountain peaks of California
- Mono people
