= Goodale Mountain =

Mountain in California, United States

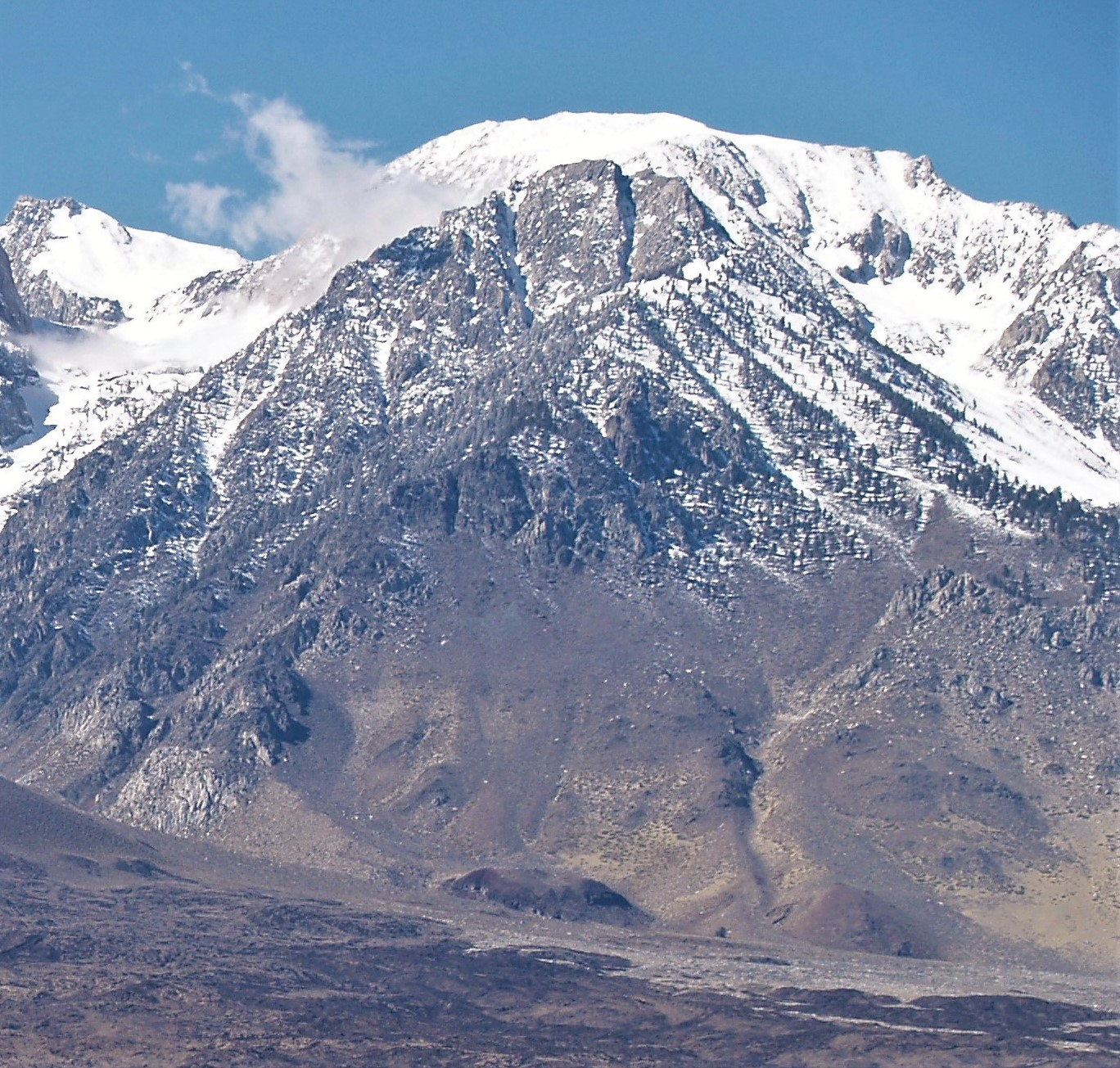
- East aspect, from Owens Valley

Highest point
- Elevation: 12,736+ ft (3882+ m) NAVD 88
- Prominence: 624 ft (190 m)
- Parent peak: Striped Mountain
- Listing: Sierra Peaks Section
- Coordinates: 36°58′20″N 118°23′08″W

Naming
- Etymology: Thomas J. Goodale

Geography
- Location within California Location within the United States
- Country: United States
- State: California
- County: Inyo
- Protected area: John Muir Wilderness
- Parent range: Sierra Nevada
- Topo map: USGS Mount Pinchot

Geology
- Rock age: Cretaceous
- Mountain type: Fault block
- Rock type: granitic

Climbing
- First ascent: July 23, 1939 by Norman Clyde, Allan MacRae and Albion J. Whitney
- Easiest route: scramble, class 2, Summit block class 3

Goodale Mountain is a 12,772-foot-elevation (3,893-meter) mountain summit located one mile east of the crest of the Sierra Nevada mountain range, in Inyo County of northern California. It is situated less than two miles southeast of Taboose Pass in the John Muir Wilderness, on land managed by Inyo National Forest. It is also 16.5 miles (26.6 km) northwest of the community of Independence, and one mile northeast of Striped Mountain, the nearest higher neighbor. Topographic relief is significant as the east aspect rises 7,200 feet (2,200 meters) above Owens Valley in 3.5 miles. It ranks as the 218th highest peak in California.

== History ==
The mountain's name was officially adopted by the United States Board on Geographic Names to commemorate Thomas Jackson Goodale (1830–1894), an Owens Valley pioneer who had an adobe house at nearby Fish Springs. The first ascent of the summit was made July 23, 1939, by Allan A. MacRae, Albion J. Whitney, and Norman Clyde who is credited with 130 first ascents, most of which were in the Sierra Nevada.

== Climate ==
According to the Köppen climate classification system, Goodale Mountain has an alpine climate. Most weather fronts originate in the Pacific Ocean, and travel east toward the Sierra Nevada mountains. As fronts approach, they are forced upward by the peaks, causing them to drop their moisture in the form of rain or snowfall onto the range (orographic lift). Precipitation runoff from this mountain drains into Goodale and Taboose Creeks, thence Owens Valley.

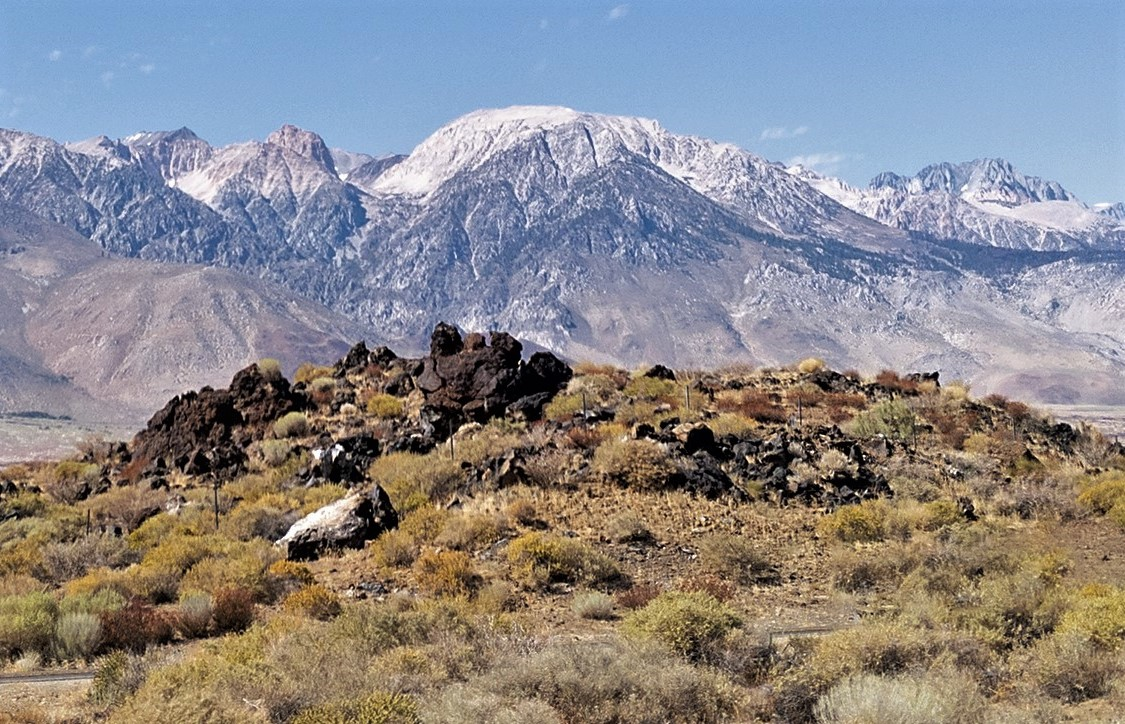
Southeast aspect, centered

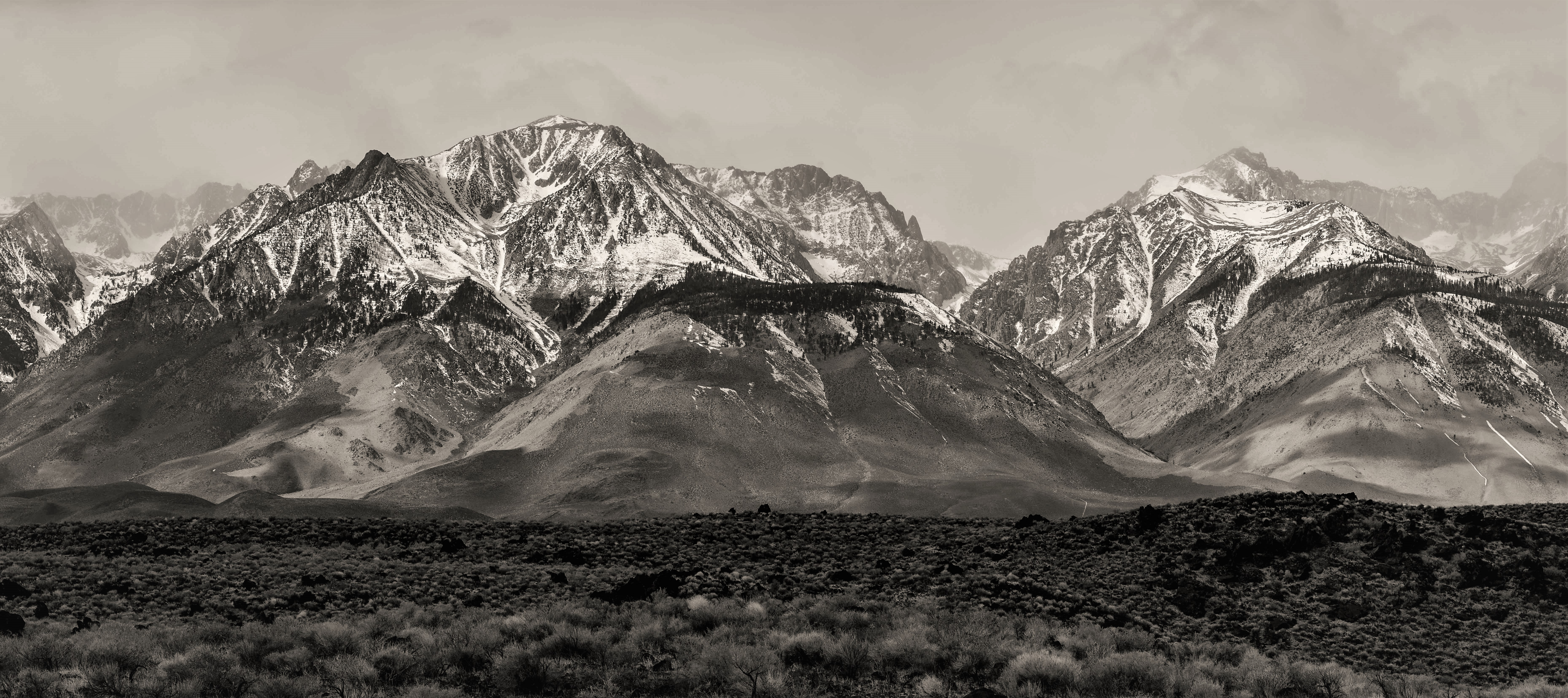
Goodale Mountain (left), Taboose Pass, Cardinal Mountain (right)

== See also ==
- List of mountain peaks of California
