= Striped Mountain =

Mountain in the American state of California

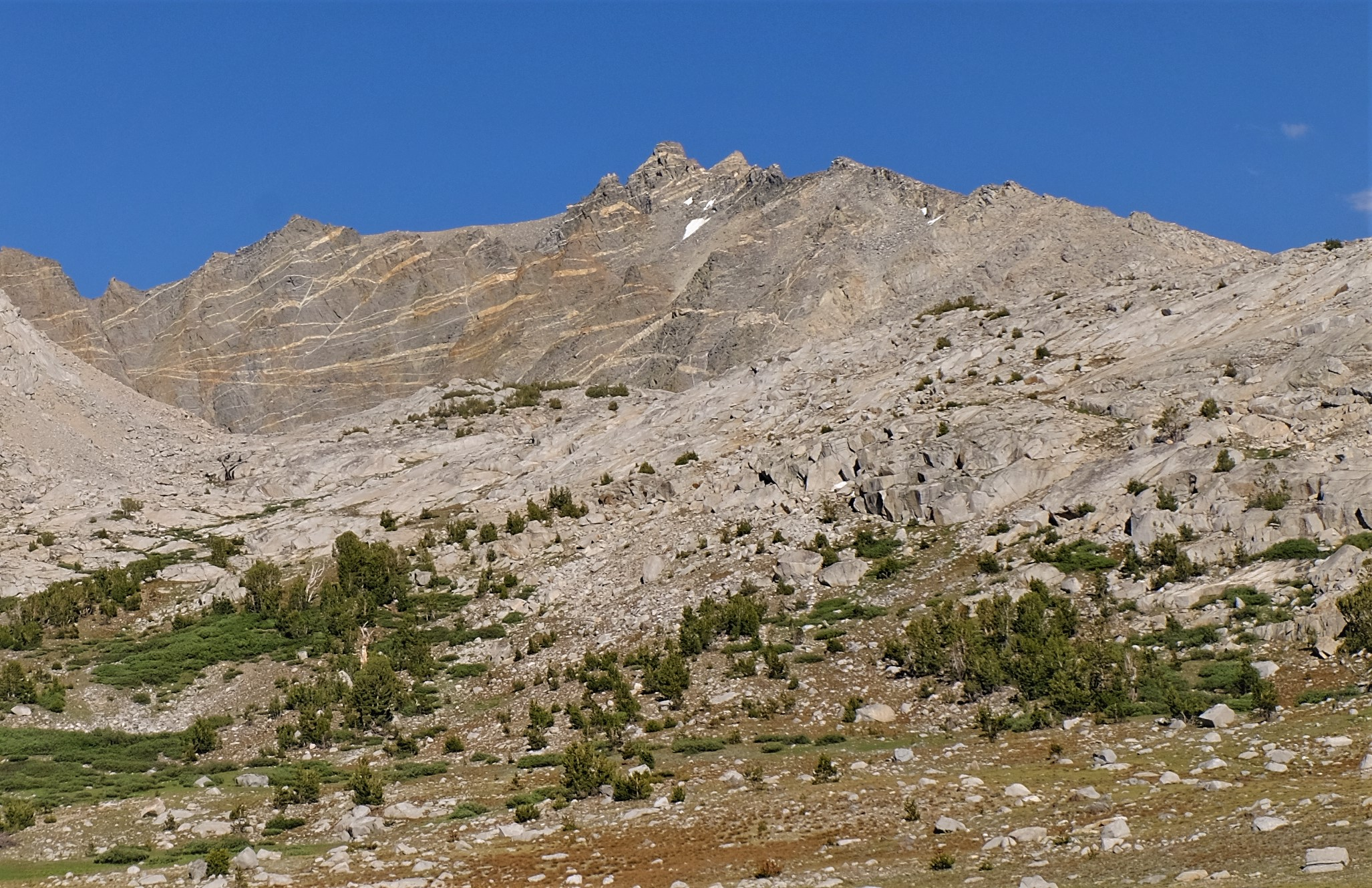
- West aspect

Highest point
- Elevation: 13,179 ft (4,017 m)
- Prominence: 515 ft (157 m)
- Parent peak: Snowdrift Peak (13,264 ft)
- Isolation: 0.58 mi (0.93 km)
- Listing: Sierra Peaks Section
- Coordinates: 36°57′56″N 118°24′14″W

Geography
- Location within California Location within the United States
- Location: Kings Canyon National Park; Fresno County / Inyo County; California, U.S.
- Parent range: Sierra Nevada
- Topo map: USGS Mount Pinchot

Geology
- Rock type: granitic

Climbing
- First ascent: July 1905
- Easiest route: class 2

Striped Mountain is a 13,179-foot-elevation (4,017-meter) mountain summit located on the crest of the Sierra Nevada mountain range in northern California. It is situated on the common border of Fresno County with Inyo County, as well as the shared boundary of John Muir Wilderness and Kings Canyon National Park. It is 8.5 miles (13.7 km) northwest of the community of Independence, approximately two miles south of Taboose Pass, and 1.9 miles (3.1 km) north of Mount Wynne. Striped Mountain ranks as the 115th highest summit in California. The first ascent of the summit was made in July 1905 by George R. Davis, a USGS topographer. Climbing routes to this mountain include Taboose Pass and the West Ridge. The John Muir Trail passes west of this peak, providing an additional approach to the mountain. Bolton Coit Brown gave this mountain its descriptive name in 1895 when he later wrote: "That nearest the pass is strikingly barred across its steep craggy summit with light streaks. As this is an unusually marked case of this peculiarity and as it seems well occasionally to have a mountain whose name bears some relation to its visible character, I called it Striped Mountain." The numerous stripes are lightly colored granitic dikes of Lamarck granodiorite intruded within Striped pluton, which is composed of fine-grained mafic granodiorite.

== Climate ==
According to the Köppen climate classification system, Striped Mountain has an alpine climate. Most weather fronts originate in the Pacific Ocean, and travel east toward the Sierra Nevada mountains. As fronts approach, they are forced upward by the peaks, causing them to drop their moisture in the form of rain or snowfall onto the range (orographic lift). Precipitation runoff from this mountain drains west into the South Fork Kings River, and east to the Owens Valley via Goodale and Taboose Creeks.

== See also ==
- Cardinal Mountain
- Goodale Mountain
- List of mountain peaks of California
