= Cardinal Mountain =

Mountain in the American state of California

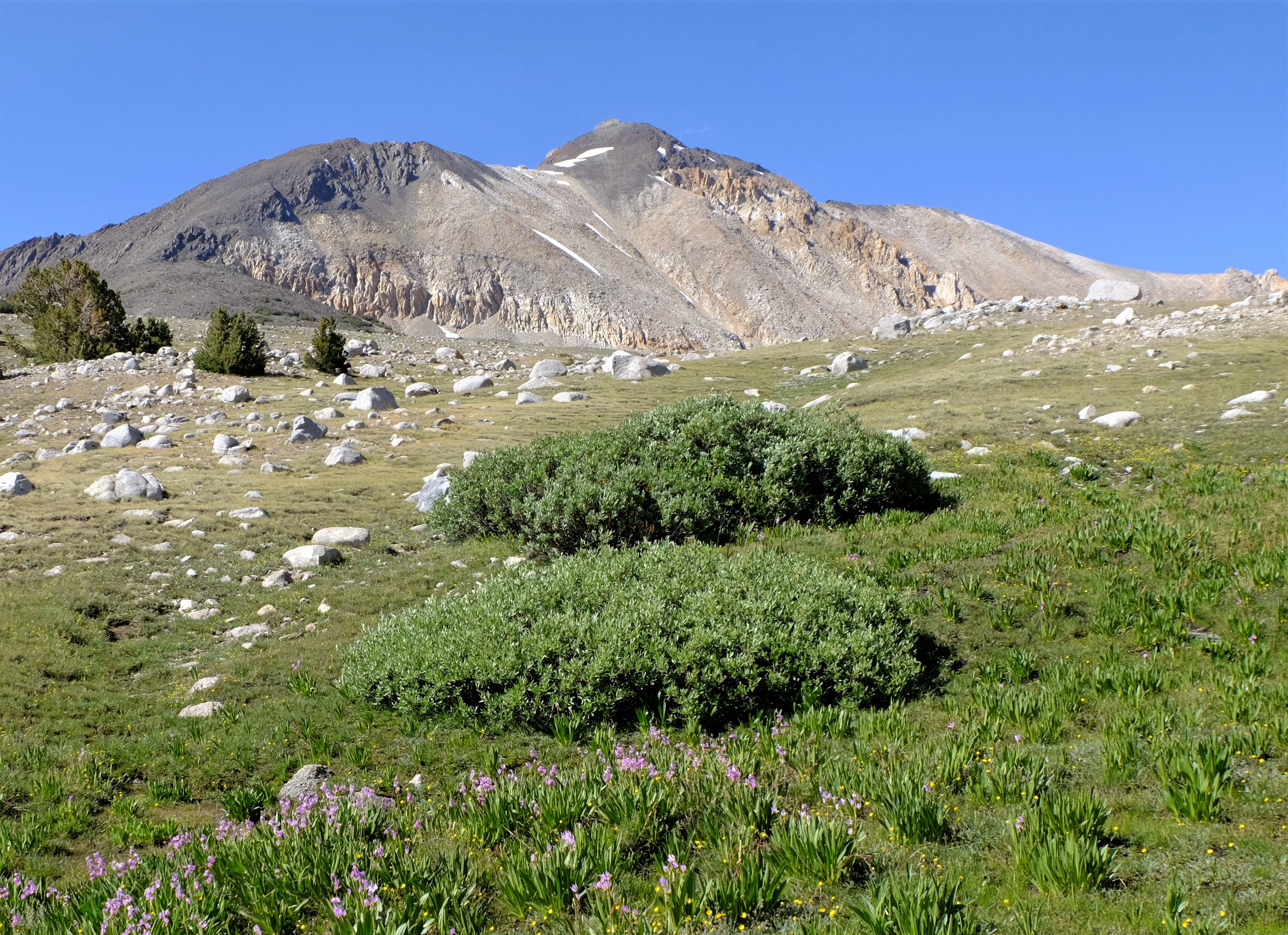
- South aspect from Taboose Pass

Highest point
- Elevation: 13,402 ft (4,085 m) NAVD 88
- Prominence: 568 ft (173 m)
- Parent peak: Split Mountain - South Peak
- Isolation: 1.14 mi (1.83 km)
- Listing: SPS Emblem peak; Vagmarken Club Sierra Crest List
- Coordinates: 36°59′58″N 118°24′46″W

Naming
- Etymology: Cardinal (color)

Geography
- Location within California Location within the United States
- Location: Kings Canyon National Park; Fresno County / Inyo County; California, U.S.
- Parent range: Sierra Nevada
- Topo map: USGS Mount Pinchot

Geology
- Rock type: metamorphic over granitic

Climbing
- First ascent: 1922
- Easiest route: Simple scramble class 2

Cardinal Mountain is a 13,396-foot-elevation (4,083-meter) mountain summit located on the crest of the Sierra Nevada mountain range in northern California. It is situated on the common border of Fresno County with Inyo County, as well as the shared boundary of John Muir Wilderness and Kings Canyon National Park. It is 14 miles (23 km) south-southwest of the community of Big Pine, approximately one mile north of Taboose Pass, and one mile south-southeast of Split Mountain, which is the nearest higher neighbor. Cardinal Mountain ranks as the 73rd highest summit in California. The first ascent of the summit was made August 11, 1922, by George Downing Jr. The standard approach is via the Taboose Pass Trail, and the John Muir Trail passes west of this peak, providing an approach option to the mountain. The mountain's descriptive name was given by George R. Davis, a USGS topographer, on account of the brilliant red color of the roof pendant, like the red cap of a cardinal.

== Climate ==
According to the Köppen climate classification system, Cardinal Mountain has an alpine climate. Most weather fronts originate in the Pacific Ocean, and travel east toward the Sierra Nevada mountains. As fronts approach, they are forced upward by the peaks, causing them to drop their moisture in the form of rain or snowfall onto the range (orographic lift). Precipitation runoff from this mountain drains west into the South Fork Kings River, and east to the Owens Valley via Red Mountain and Taboose Creeks.

== See also ==
- List of mountain peaks of California

== Gallery ==
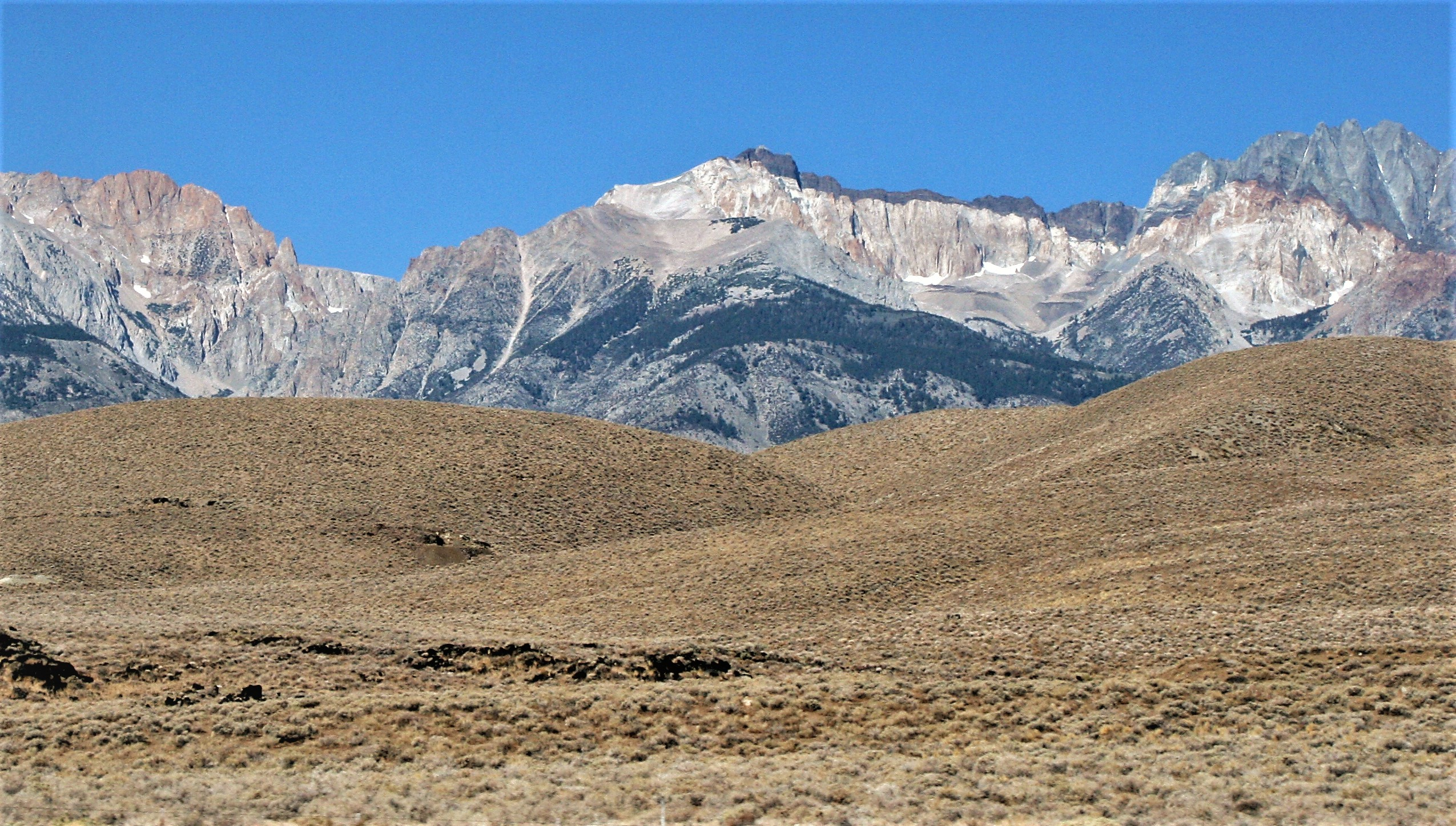
East aspect

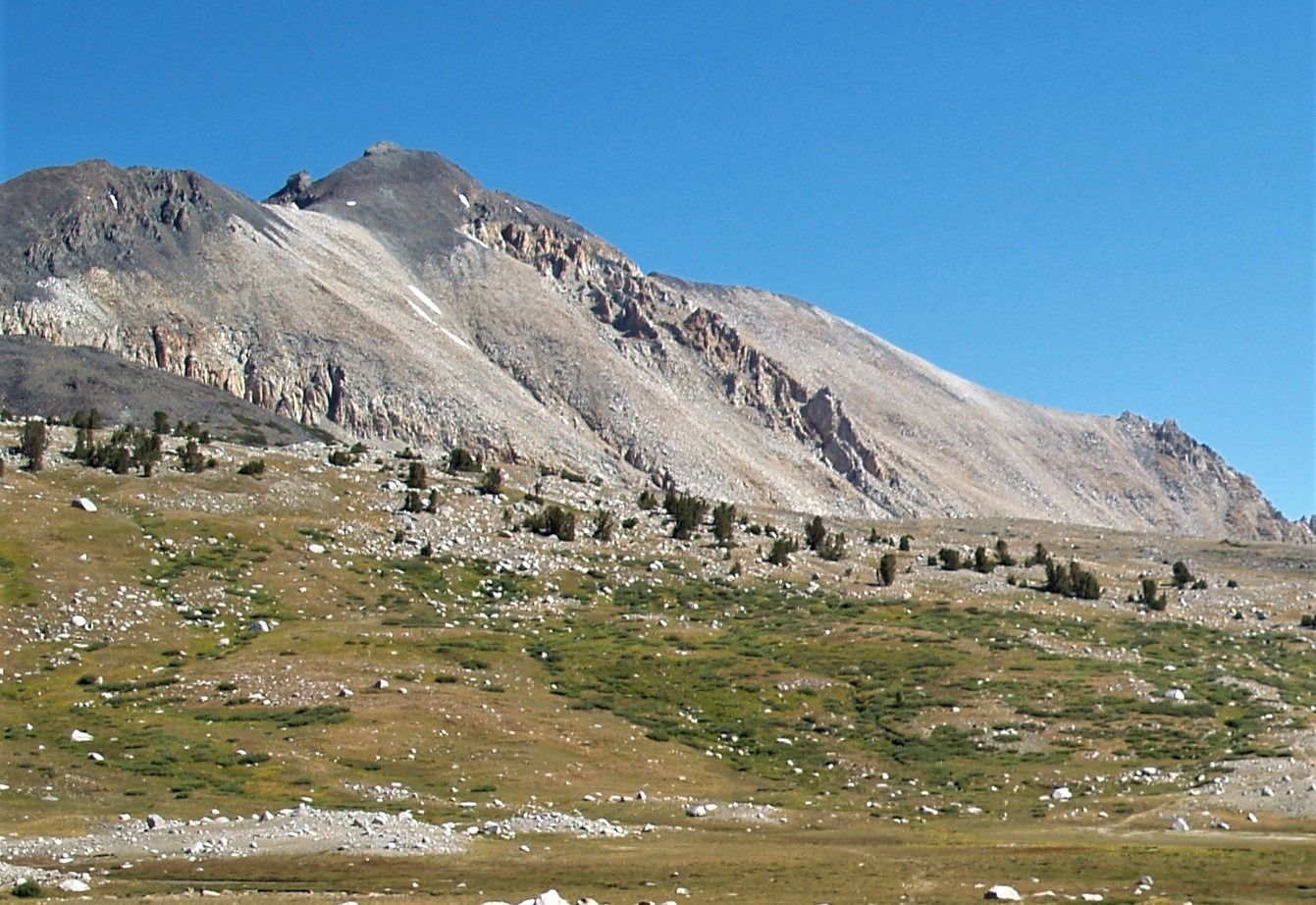
South aspect

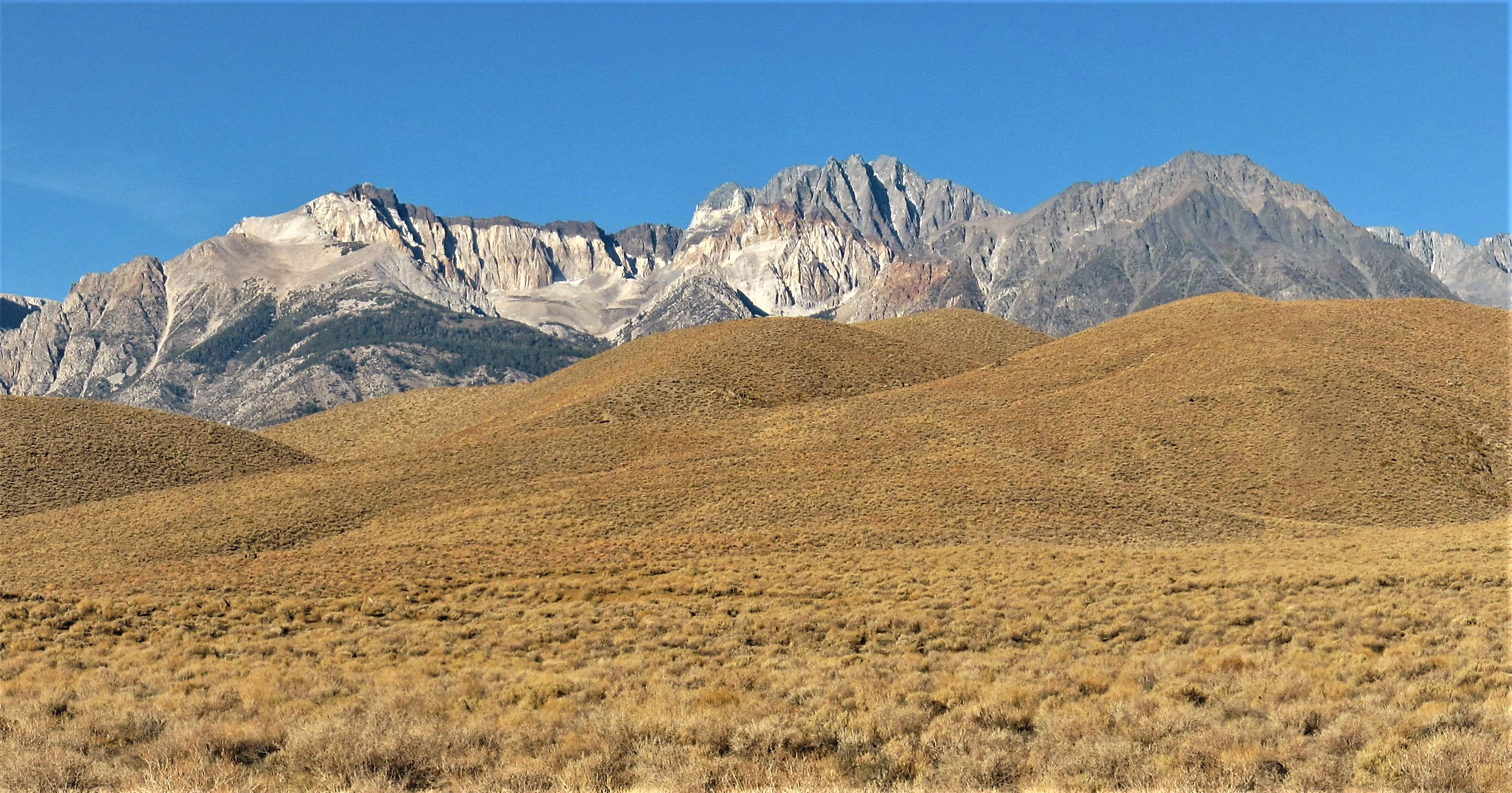
Cardinal Mountain (left), Split Mountain, Mount Tinemaha (right), from Hwy 395

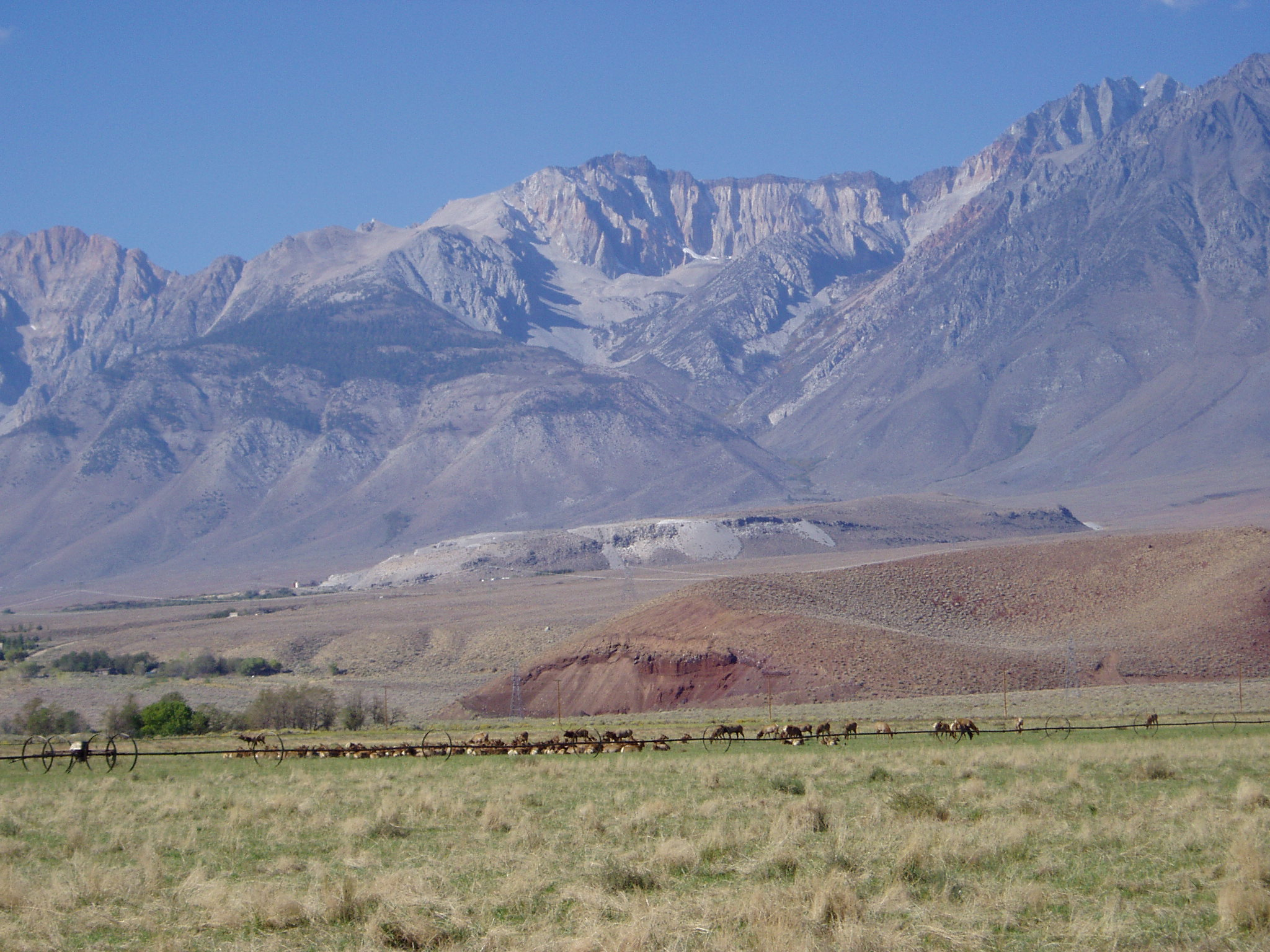
Cardinal Mountain
