= Vennacher Needle =

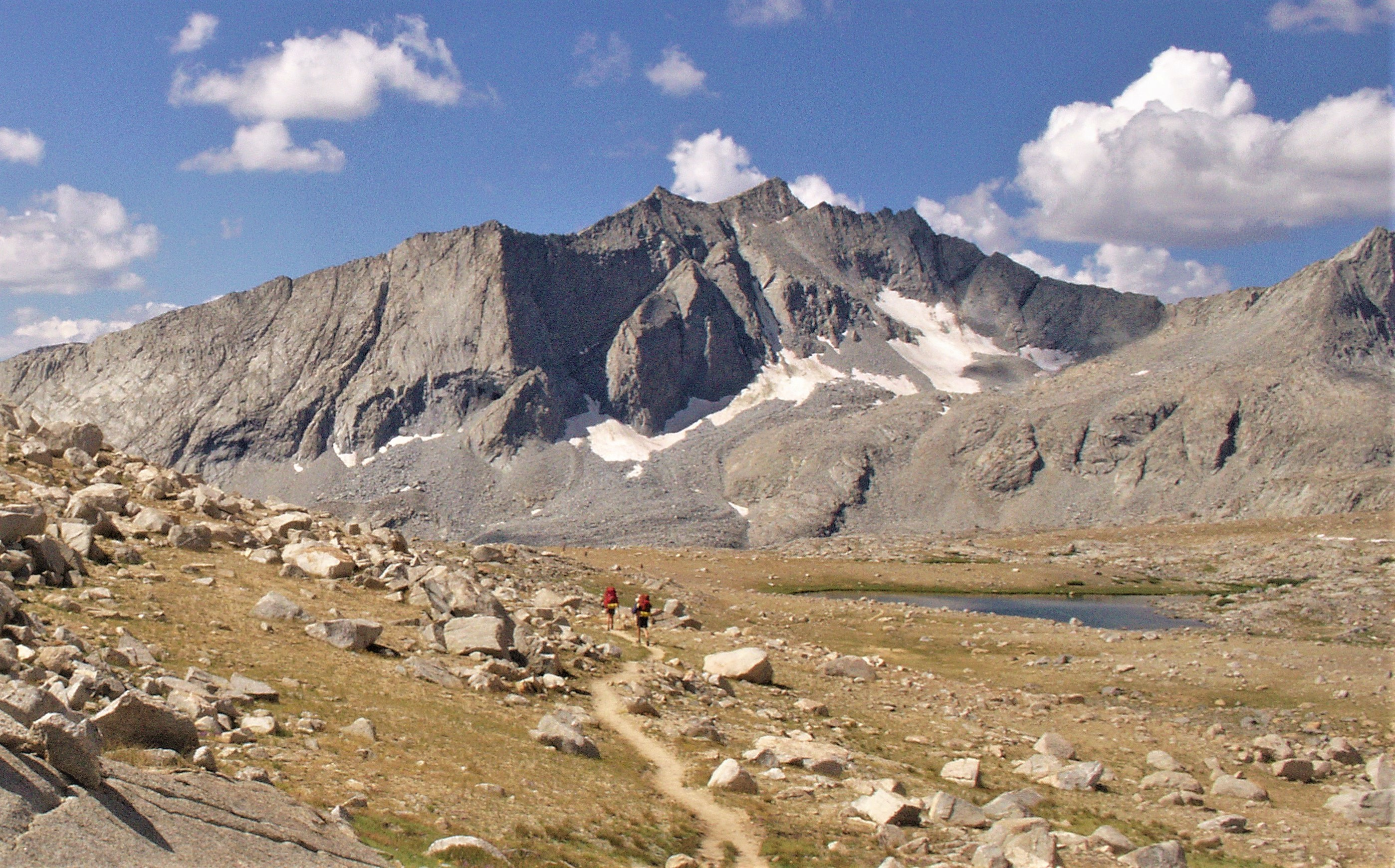
- North aspect, from JMT in Upper Basin

Highest point
- Elevation: 12,995 ft (3,961 m)
- Prominence: 889 ft (271 m)
- Parent peak: Twin Peaks ( 13,061 ft)
- Isolation: 2.85 mi (4.59 km)
- Coordinates: 36°59′56″N 118°28′26″W

Geography
- Location within California Location within the United States
- Location: Kings Canyon National Park; Fresno County; California, U.S.
- Parent range: Sierra Nevada
- Topo map: USGS Mount Pinchot

Geology
- Rock type: granitic

Climbing
- Easiest route: class 2 Southeast slope

Vennacher Needle is a 12,995-foot-elevation (3,961-meter) mountain summit located in Kings Canyon National Park, in Fresno County of northern California, United States. It is situated west of the crest of the Sierra Nevada mountain range, and 1.4 miles (2.3 km) north of Mount Ruskin. Topographic relief is significant as the east aspect rises nearly 2,300 feet (700 meters) above the Upper Basin of South Fork Kings River in one mile. The John Muir Trail, which passes one mile to the east of this mountain, provides one possible approach option. This mountain's name has been officially adopted by the United States Board on Geographic Names.

== Climate ==
According to the Köppen climate classification system, Vennacher Needle is located in an alpine climate zone. Most weather fronts originate in the Pacific Ocean, and travel east toward the Sierra Nevada mountains. As fronts approach, they are forced upward by the peaks (orographic lift), causing them to drop their moisture in the form of rain or snowfall onto the range. Precipitation runoff from this mountain drains into tributaries of the Kings River.

== Gallery ==
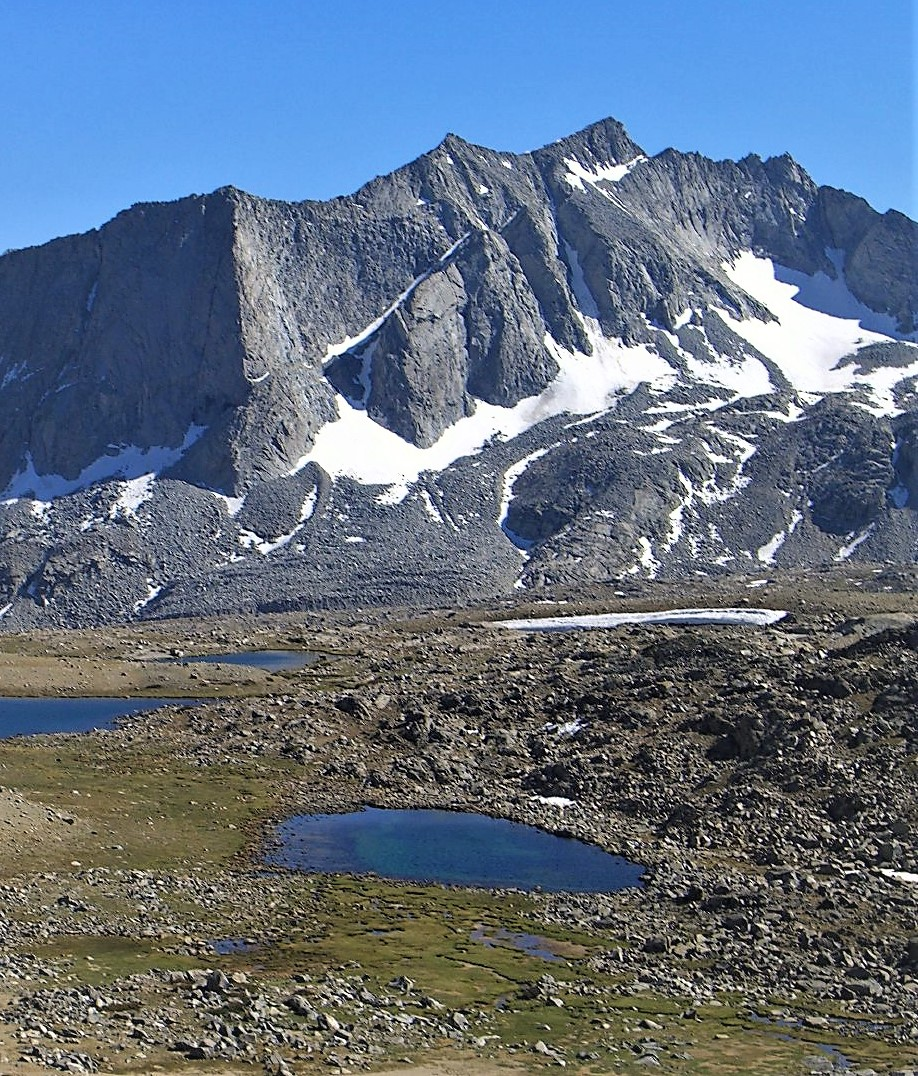
Vennacher Needle

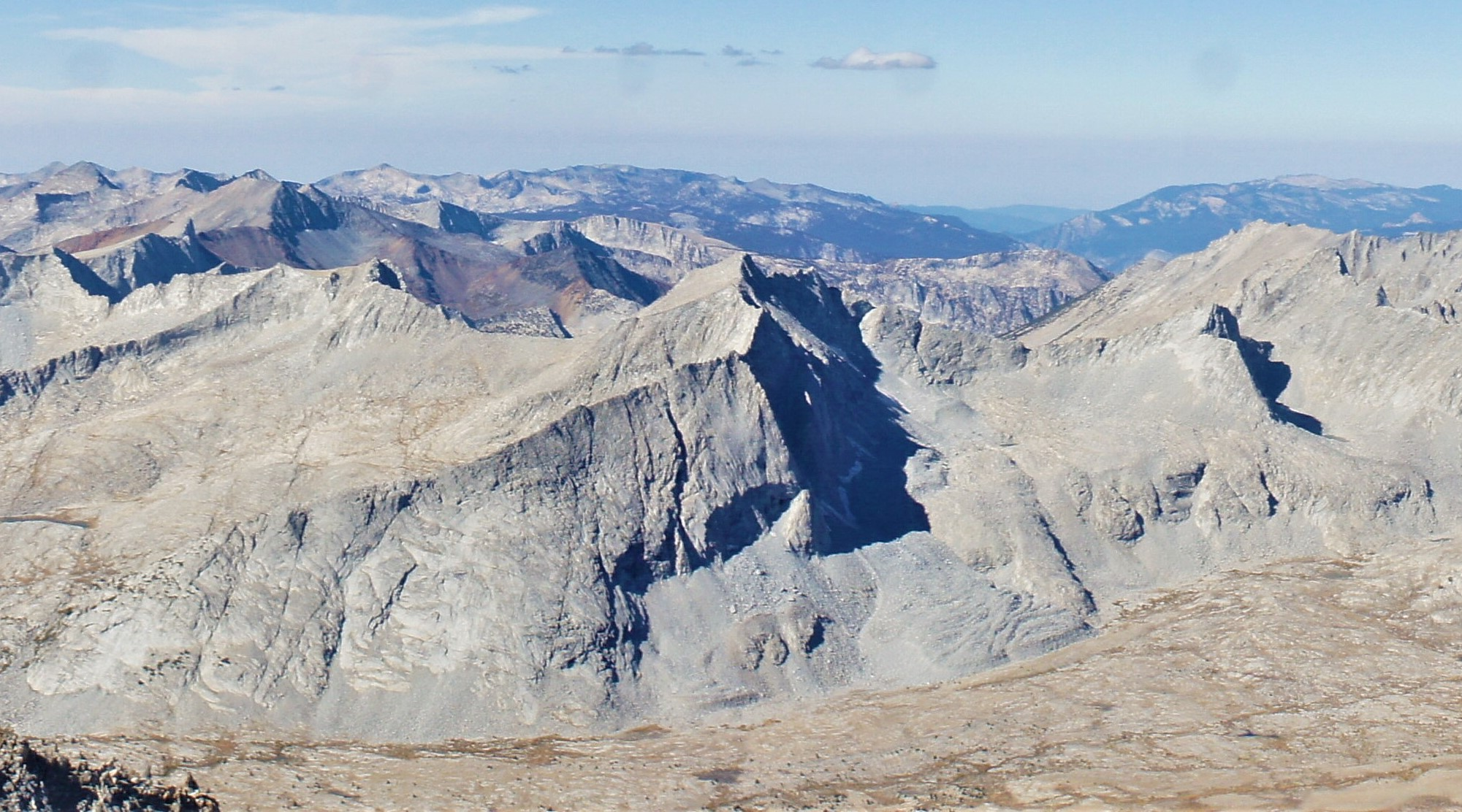
Vennacher Needle seen from Split Mountain

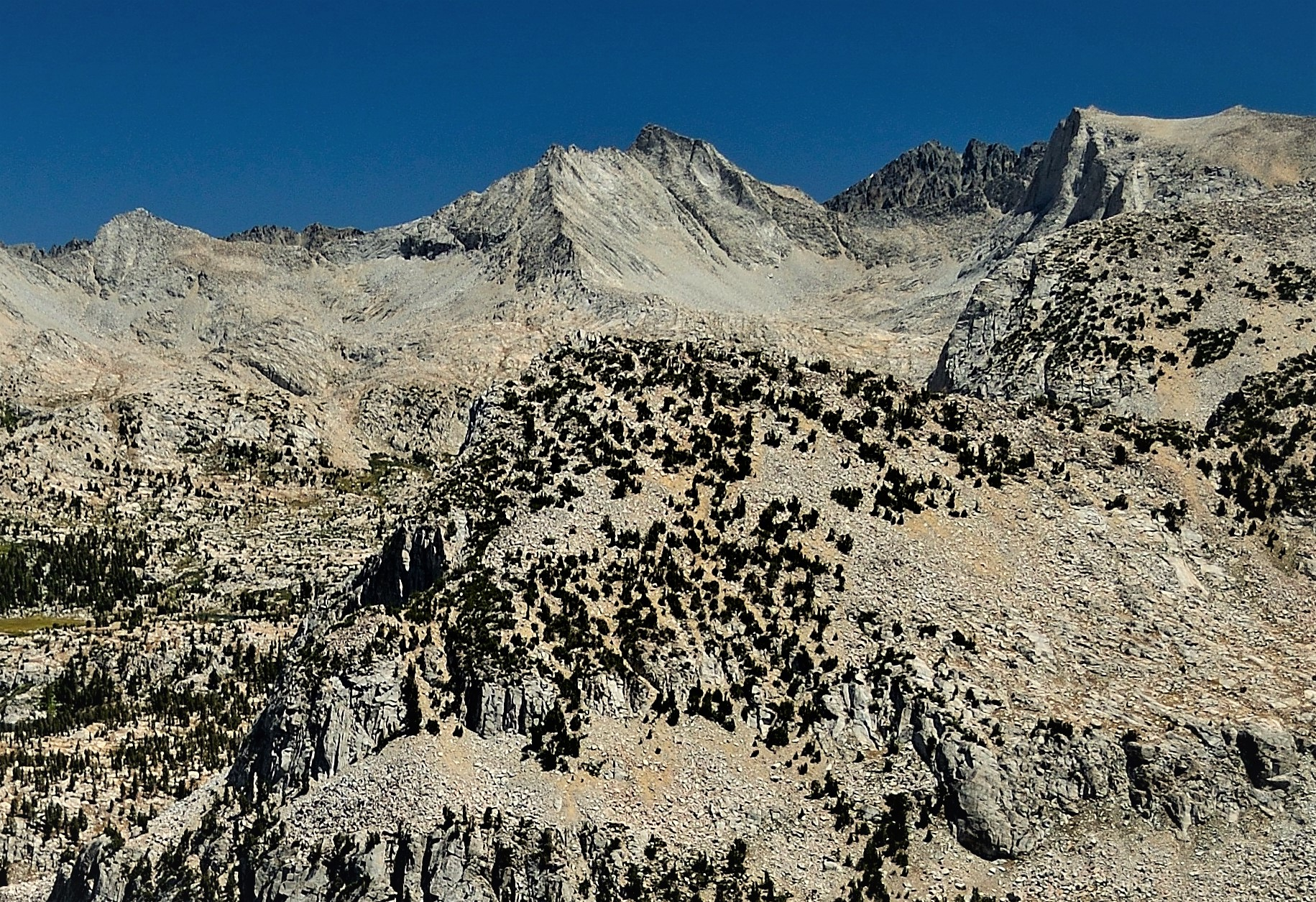
Vennacher Needle from southwest

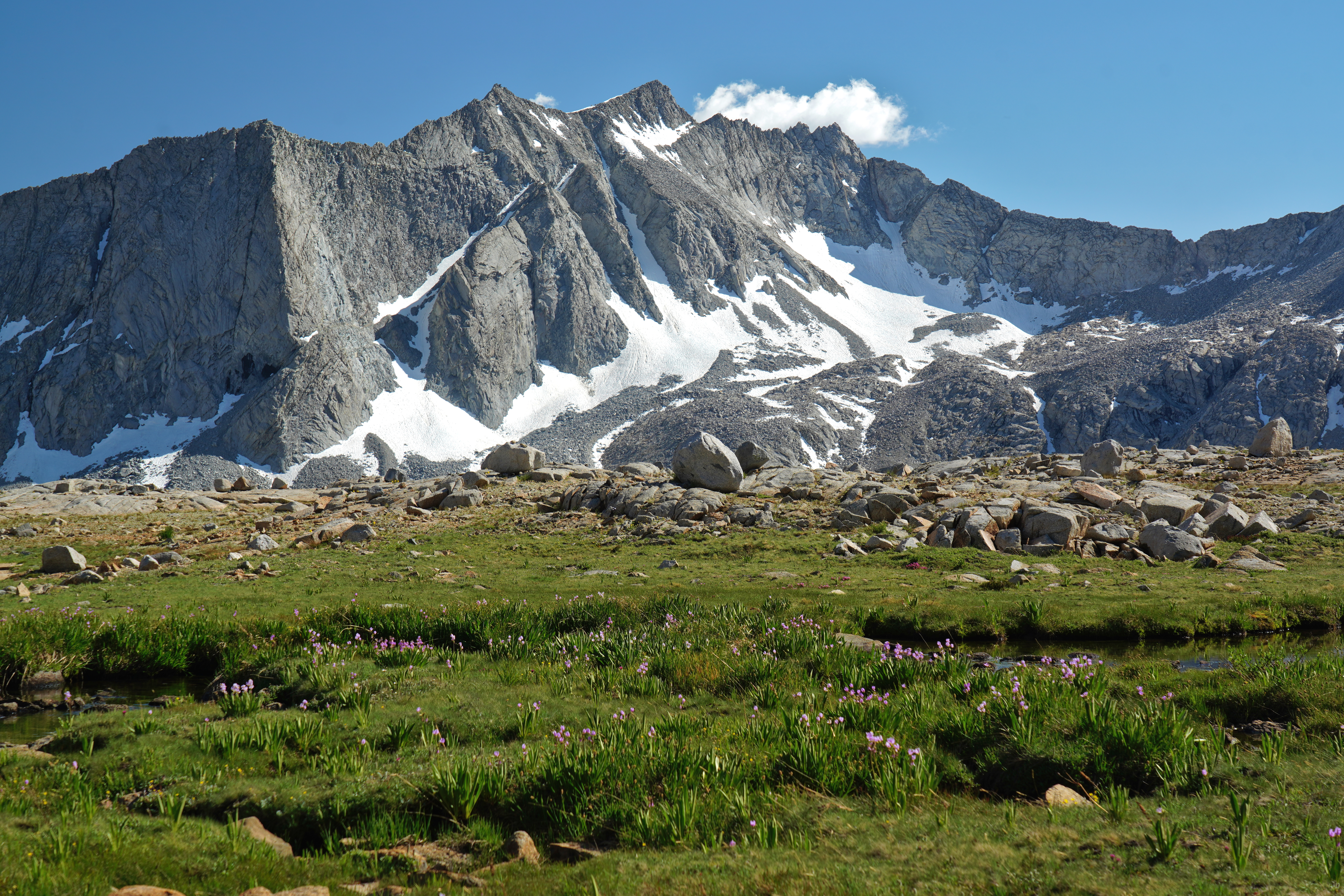
Vennacher Needle from approach to Mather Pass

== See also ==
- List of mountain peaks of California
