= Mount Ruskin =

Mountain summit in northern California

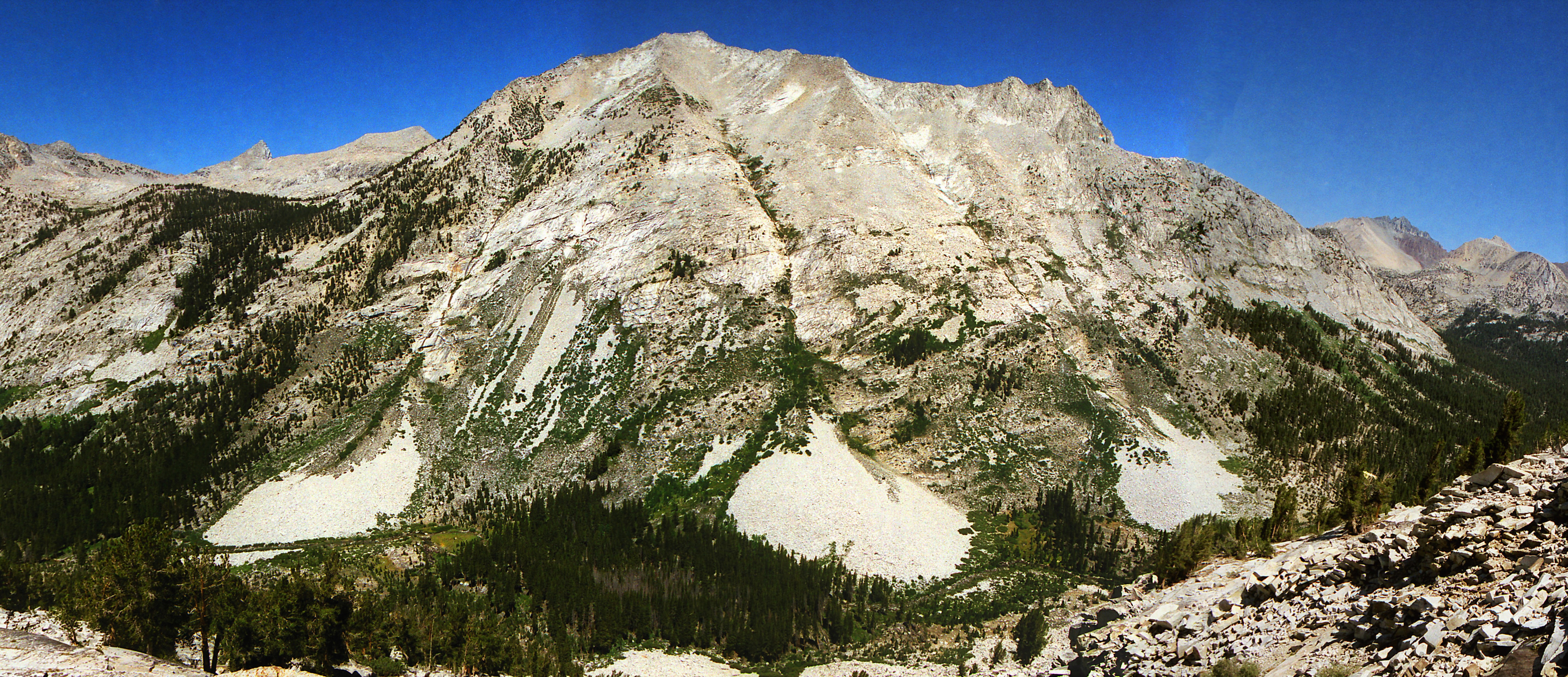
- South aspect, from Bench Lake area

Highest point
- Elevation: 12,920 ft (3,940 m)
- Prominence: 553 ft (169 m)
- Parent peak: Vennacher Needle (12,995 ft)
- Isolation: 1.40 mi (2.25 km)
- Listing: Sierra Peaks Section
- Coordinates: 36°58′42″N 118°28′24″W

Naming
- Etymology: John Ruskin

Geography
- Location within California Location within the United States
- Location: Kings Canyon National Park; Fresno County; California, U.S.
- Parent range: Sierra Nevada
- Topo map: USGS Mount Pinchot

Geology
- Rock type: granitic

Climbing
- First ascent: 1895
- Easiest route: class 3

Mount Ruskin is a 12,920-foot-elevation (3,940-meter) mountain summit located in Kings Canyon National Park, in Fresno County of northern California, United States. It is situated west of the crest of the Sierra Nevada mountain range, immediately east of Cartridge Pass, and 1.4 miles (2.3 km) south of Vennacher Needle, the nearest higher neighbor. Topographic relief is significant as the south aspect rises over 3,280 feet (1,000 meters) above South Fork Kings River in 1.5 mile.

== History ==
The first ascent of the summit was made August 7, 1895, by Bolton Coit Brown via the class 3 northwest ridge from Cartridge Pass. The class 3 west slope was first climbed August 13, 1945, by Art Reyman.

Mount Ruskin was named in 1895 by Professor Bolton Brown for John Ruskin (1819–1900), English writer and critic. This mountain's name has been officially adopted by the United States Board on Geographic Names.

== Climate ==
According to the Köppen climate classification system, Mount Ruskin is located in an alpine climate zone. Most weather fronts originate in the Pacific Ocean, and travel east toward the Sierra Nevada mountains. As fronts approach, they are forced upward by the peaks, causing them to drop their moisture in the form of rain or snowfall onto the range (orographic lift). Precipitation runoff from this mountain drains into tributaries of the Kings River.

== Gallery ==
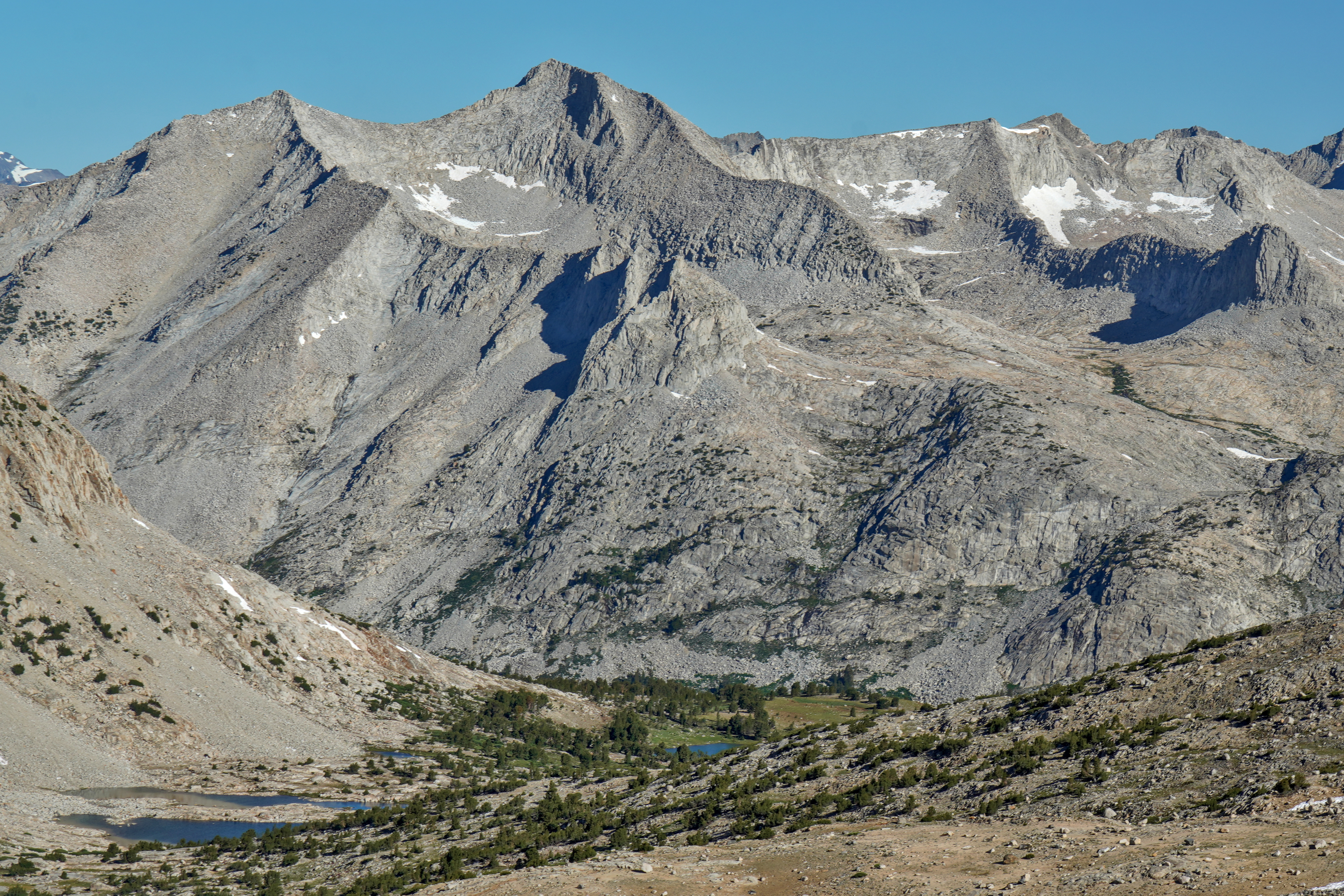
Southeast aspect

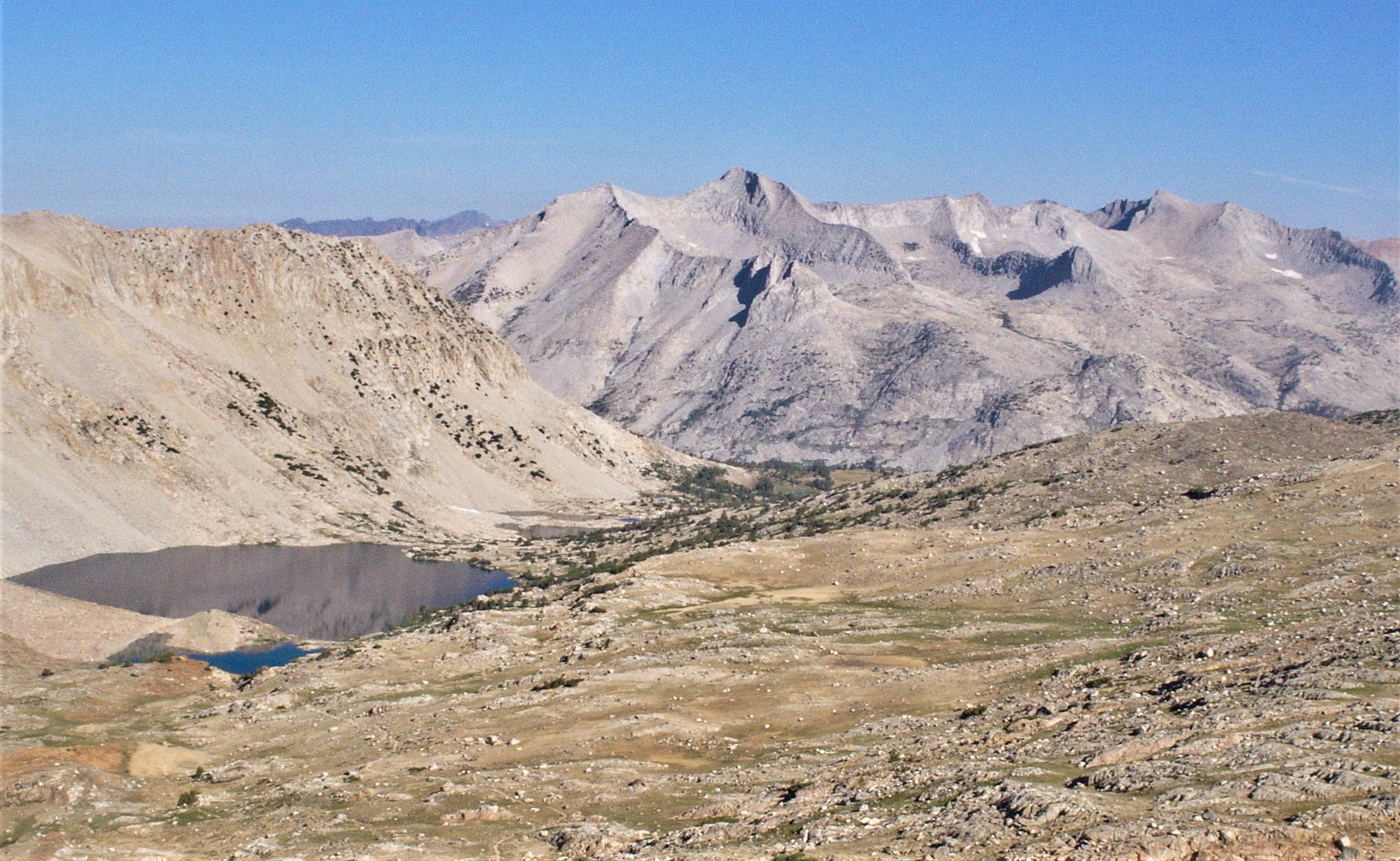
Mount Ruskin and Lake Marjorie seen from the southeast near Pinchot Pass

== See also ==
- List of mountain peaks of California
