= Split Mountain (California) =

Mountain of the Sierra Nevada in California, United States

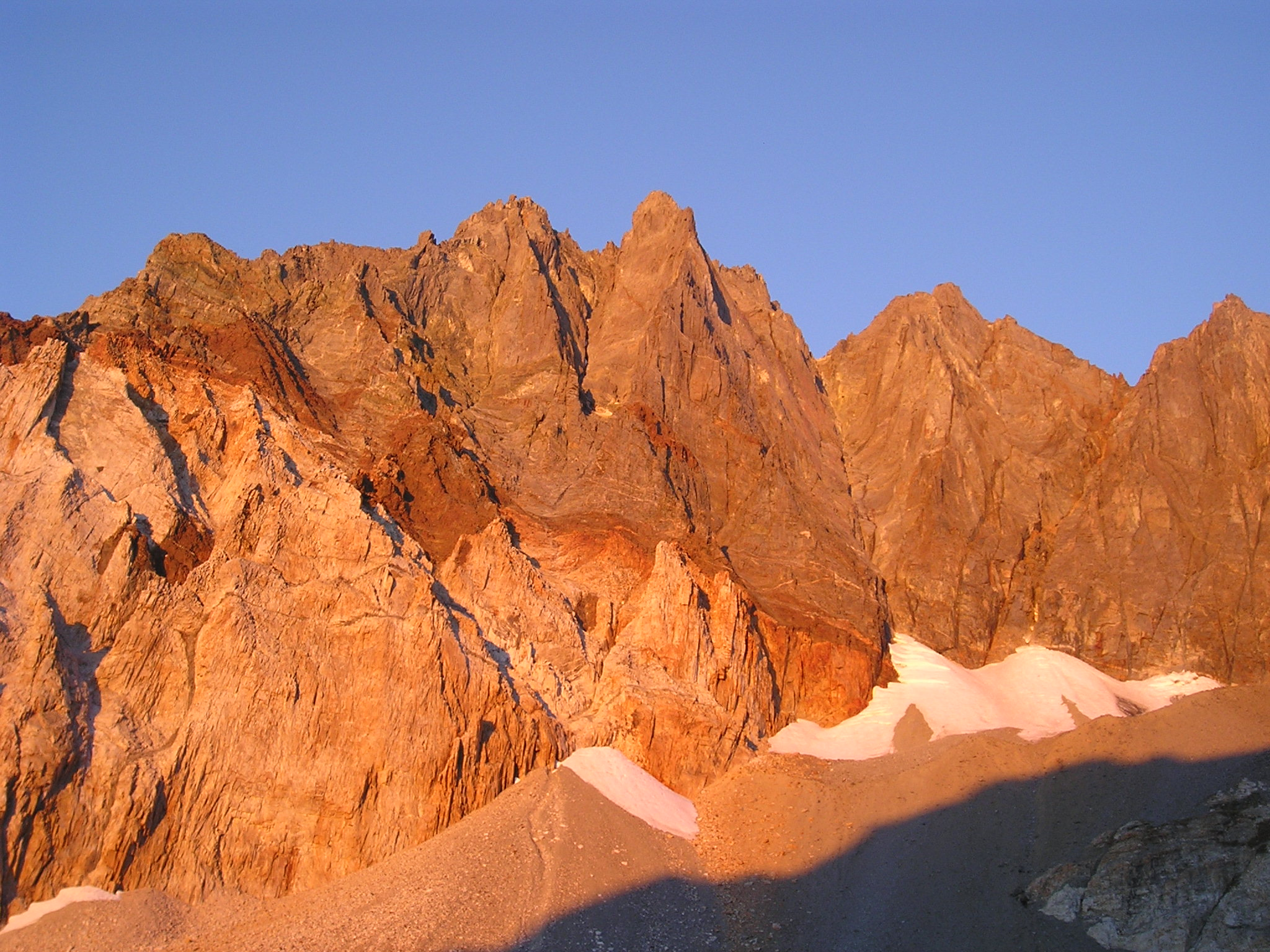
- Sunrise on Split Mountain's east face, September 2004.

Highest point
- Elevation: 14,064 ft (4,287 m) NAVD 88
- Prominence: 1,525 ft (465 m)
- Parent peak: North Palisade
- Listing: California fourteeners 8th; SPS Emblem peak; Vagmarken Club Sierra Crest List; Western Climbers Star peak
- Coordinates: 37°01′15″N 118°25′21″W

Geography
- Location within California
- Location: Fresno / Inyo counties, Calif., U.S.
- Parent range: Sierra Nevada
- Topo map: USGS Split Mountain

Geology
- Mountain type: granite

Climbing
- First ascent: 1887, Frank Saulque and party
- Easiest route: North slope, scramble (class 2)

Split Mountain is a fourteener in the Sierra Nevada of the U.S. state of California, near the southeast end of the Palisades group of peaks. It is the only fourteener in the watershed of the South Fork Kings River, and it rises to 14,064 feet (4,287 m), making it the eighth-highest peak in the state.

== Geography ==
Split Mountain's twin summits lie on a north–south running section of the Sierra Crest. This same line of ridges divides Fresno County and Kings Canyon National Park to the west, from Inyo County and the Inyo National Forest to the east. Precipitation falling on the Crest drains to the Kings River to the west, and the Owens River to the east.

== Geology ==
The two-toned appearance of the mountain's eastern face is created by a roof pendant of darker colored granodiorite atop a lighter colored body of leucogranite.

== History ==
The name Split Mountain, inspired by the shape of its double summit, was coined by artist and mountaineer Bolton Brown in 1896. The Wheeler Survey called the mountain Southeast Palisade and other parties called it South Palisade, but Split Mountain is not properly part of the Palisade mountains group to the north.

The first ascent of the peak was made by Frank Salque and his companions by an unknown route in 1887. Joseph LeConte, Helen LeConte, and Curtis M. Lindley are sometimes credited instead, having summited in 1902 from the west side.

== Recreation ==
Split Mountain is one of the easier California fourteeners to climb. The least technical route is the class 2 north slope, which can be approached from the west—where the slope is accessible from the John Muir Trail as it descends from Mather Pass—or the east. Joseph LeConte, Helen LeConte and Curtis Lindley took the simple western approach from Upper Basin when they climbed Split Mountain on July 23, 1902. A more common route to the north face is from the east, by way of Red Lake. Starting at the Red Lake trailhead, this trail covers six miles (10 km) with 4,000 feet (1,220 m) of elevation gain one way to the lake. From here, another 3,500 feet (1,070 m) of cross-country climbing, including a short class 3 ridge traverse, leads to the summit.

There are many more technical routes up both the north and south peaks of Split Mountain.

Split Couloir, a steep couloir dividing the north and south peaks of Split Mountain on its eastern side, is included in the book Fifty Classic Ski Descents of North America, published in 2010.

== See also ==
- List of mountain peaks of California
- List of California fourteeners
- The Palisades of the Sierra Nevada
