= Mount Hooper =

Mountain in the state of California

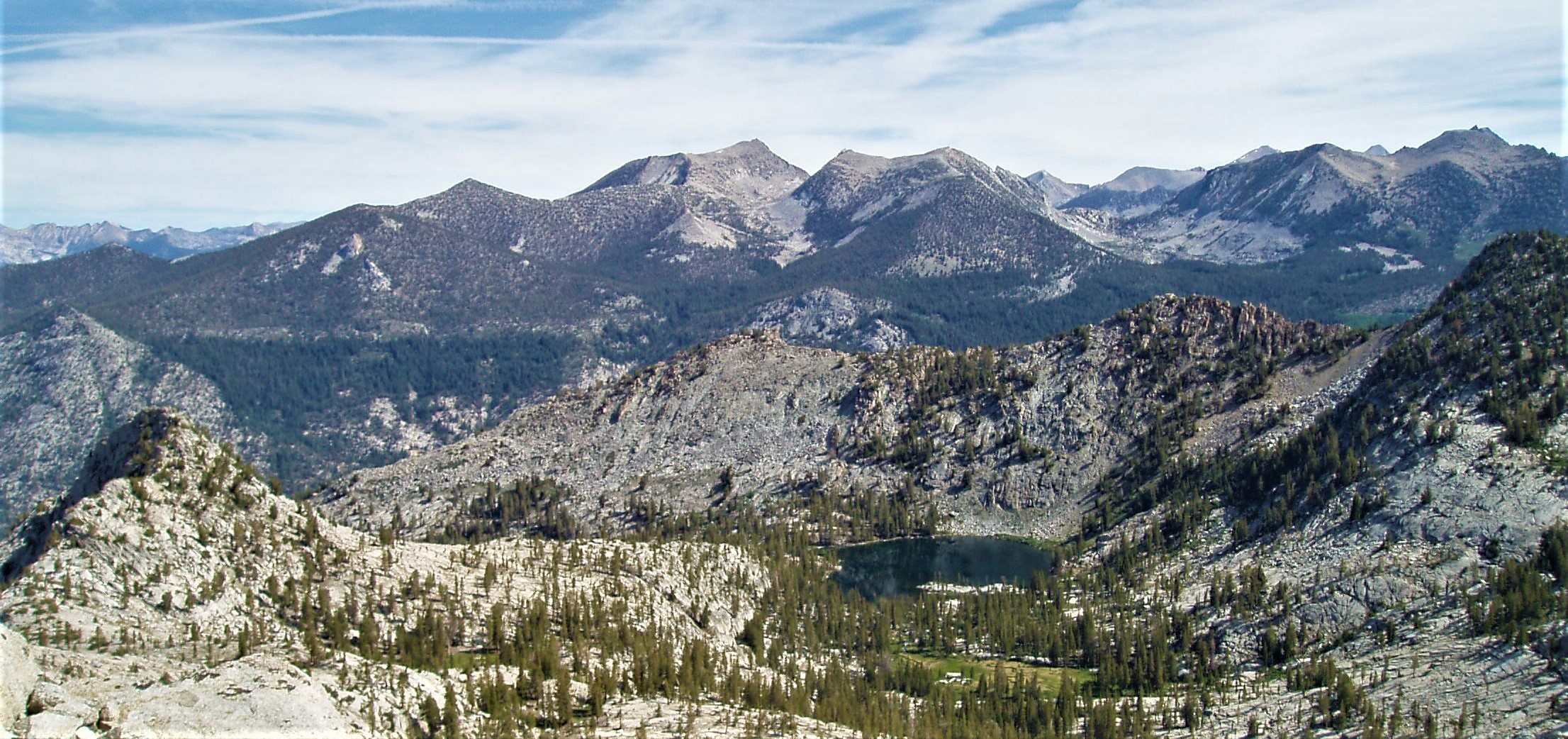
- South aspect, centered on horizon

Highest point
- Elevation: 12,349 ft (3,764 m)
- Prominence: 1,469 ft (448 m)
- Parent peak: Gemini (12,880 ft)
- Isolation: 3.61 mi (5.81 km)
- Listing: Sierra Peaks Section
- Coordinates: 37°17′32″N 118°53′42″W

Naming
- Etymology: William Burchell Hooper

Geography
- Location within California Location within the United States
- Country: United States
- State: California
- County: Fresno
- Protected area: John Muir Wilderness
- Parent range: Sierra Nevada
- Topo map: USGS Florence Lake

Geology
- Rock age: Cretaceous
- Mountain type: Fault block
- Rock type: Granodiorite

Climbing
- First ascent: 1929
- Easiest route: class 4 via Selden Pass

Mount Hooper is a 12,349-foot (3,764 meter) high mountain summit located west of the crest of the Sierra Nevada mountain range in Fresno County of northern California, United States. It is set within the John Muir Wilderness, on land managed by Sierra National Forest. It is situated 4.26 miles (6.86 km) west of Gemini, 3.6 miles (5.8 km) southwest of Seven Gables, and 2.25 miles (3.62 km) west-northwest of Mount Senger. Hooper ranks as the 326th-highest summit in California, and topographic relief is significant as the summit rises over 5,000 feet (1,500 meters) above Florence Lake in approximately four miles. The John Muir Trail traverses the east slope of the mountain, providing an approach option.

== History ==
The mountain was named by R. B. Marshall of the United States Geological Survey probably during the 1907–09 USGS survey, and officially adopted in 1911 by the U.S. Board on Geographic Names to honor Major William Burchell Hooper (October 8, 1836 – July 16, 1903), proprietor of the Occidental Hotel in San Francisco. Marshall also named nearby Rose Lake (one mile north) for Rosa Hooper, the daughter of William Hooper and sister of Selden Stuart Hooper, an assistant with the USGS from 1891 to 1898. Selden Pass, which the John Muir Trail crosses, is one mile east of the peak and was also named by Marshall.

The first ascent of the summit was made in 1929 by Glen Dawson, William D. Horsfall, and John Nixon. Today this peak draws climbing interest because it is included on the Sierra Peaks Section's peak bagging list.

== Climate ==
According to the Köppen climate classification system, Mount Hooper is located in an alpine climate zone. Most weather fronts originate in the Pacific Ocean, and travel east toward the Sierra Nevada mountains. As fronts approach, they are forced upward by the peaks (orographic lift), causing them to drop their moisture in the form of rain or snowfall onto the range. Precipitation runoff from this mountain drains into the San Joaquin River watershed.

== See also ==
- List of mountain peaks of California

== Gallery ==
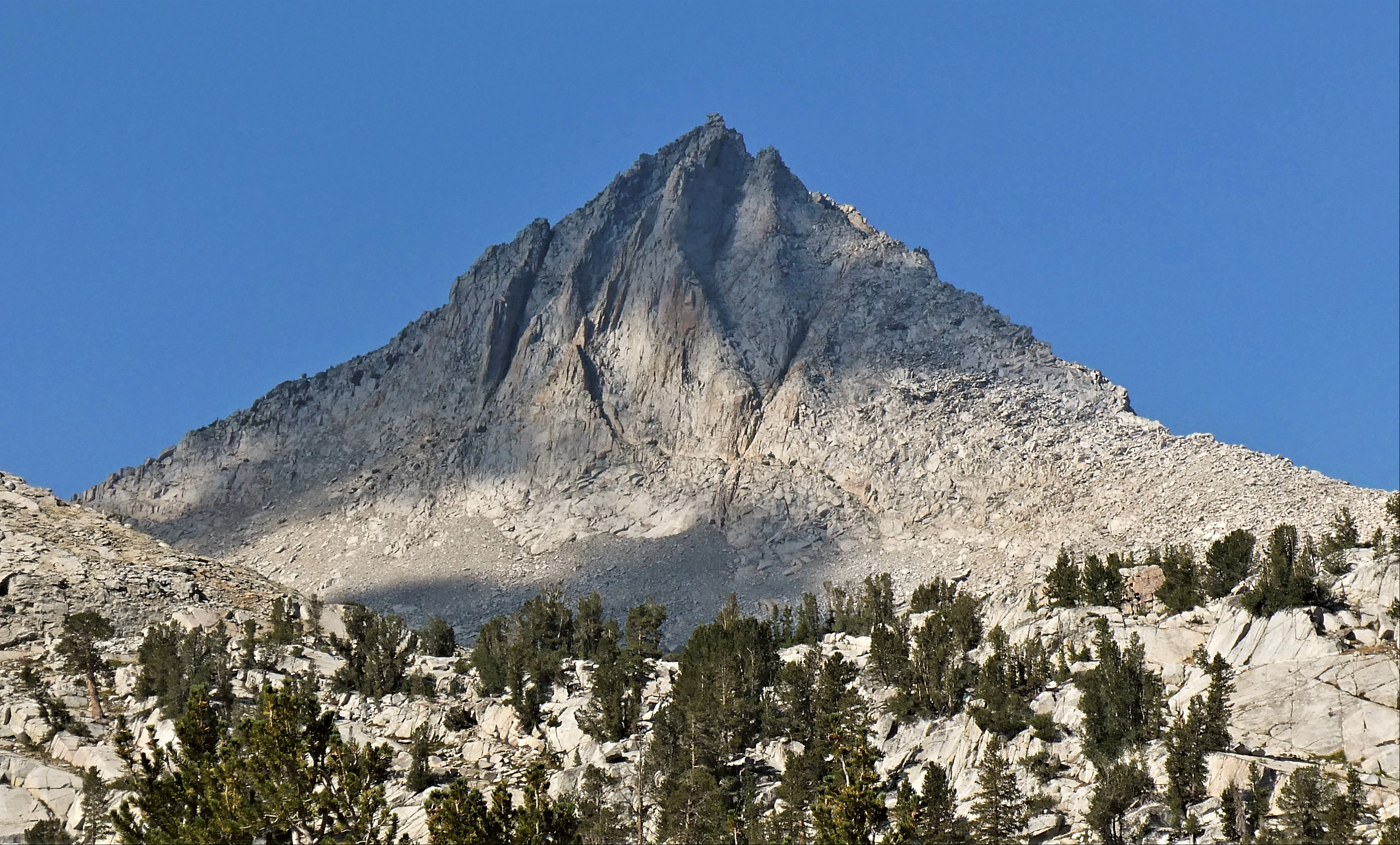
East aspect

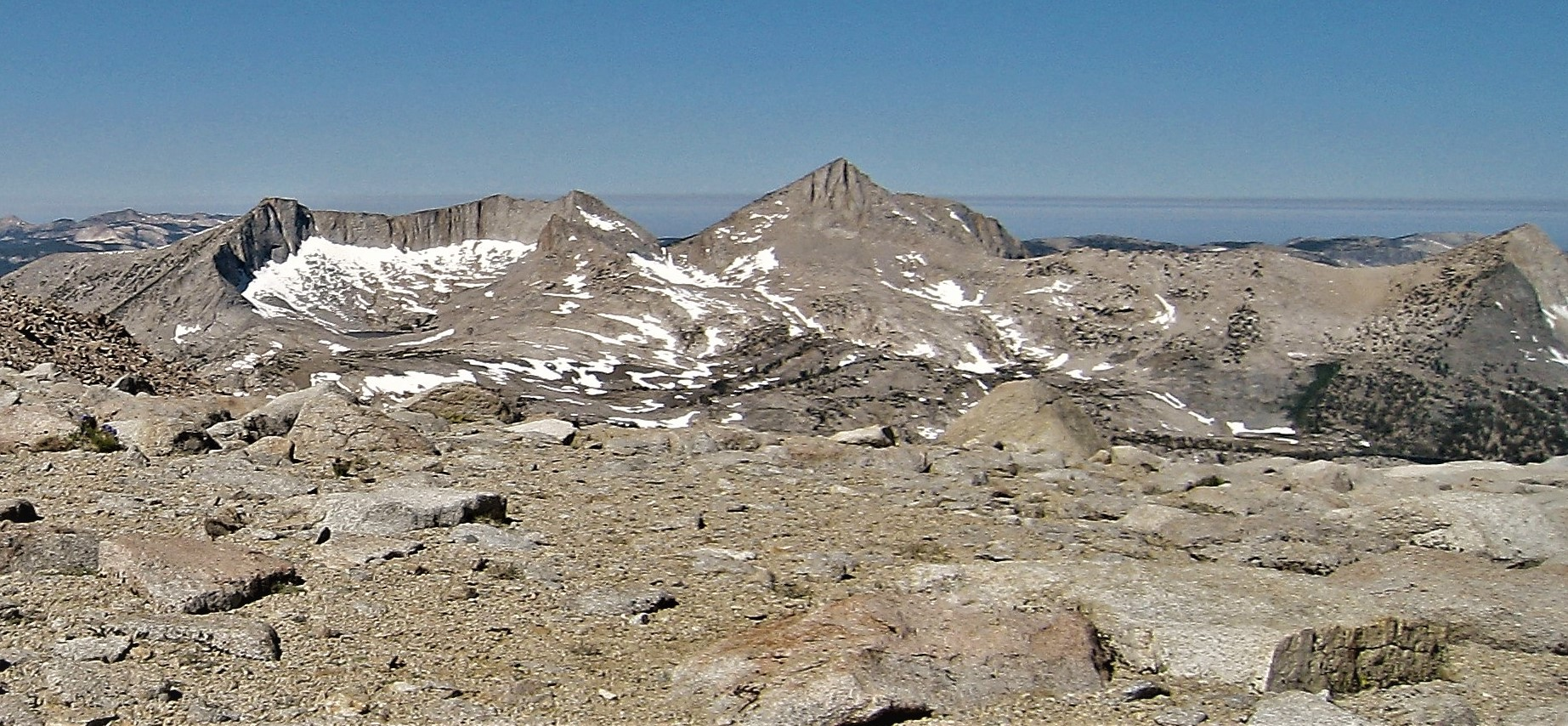
Hooper from the east
