= Mount Senger =

Mountain in the state of California

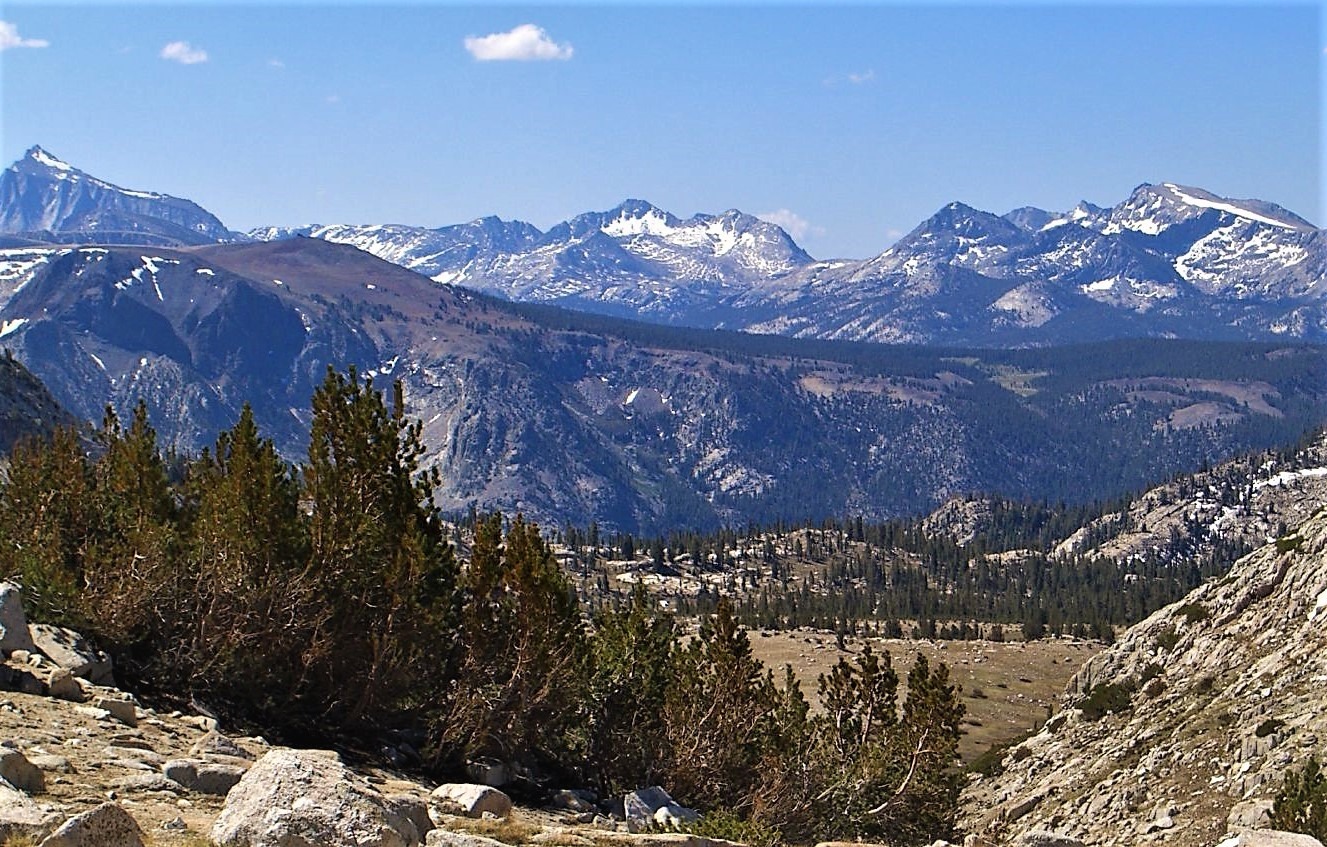
- North aspect, centered on horizon

Highest point
- Elevation: 12,286 ft (3,745 m)
- Prominence: 1,046 ft (319 m)
- Parent peak: Gemini (12,880 ft)
- Isolation: 2.24 mi (3.60 km)
- Listing: Sierra Peaks Section
- Coordinates: 37°16′40″N 118°51′30″W

Naming
- Etymology: Joachim H. Senger

Geography
- Location within California Location within the United States
- Location: Fresno County, California, U.S.
- Parent range: Sierra Nevada
- Topo map: USGS Mount Hilgard

Geology
- Rock age: Cretaceous
- Mountain type: Fault block
- Rock type: Granodiorite

Climbing
- First ascent: 1907–09 by USGS
- Easiest route: class 2

Mount Senger is a 12,286-foot-elevation (3,745-meter) mountain summit located west of the crest of the Sierra Nevada mountain range in Fresno County of northern California, United States. It is set within the John Muir Wilderness, on land managed by Sierra National Forest. It is situated 2.2 miles (3.5 km) southeast of Mount Hooper, 2.6 miles (4.2 km) southwest of Gemini, and 2.7 miles (4.3 km) south-southwest of Seven Gables. Senger ranks as the 348th-highest summit in California. Topographic relief is significant as the summit rises over 4,600 feet (1,400 meters) above the South Fork San Joaquin River in approximately three miles. The John Muir Trail traverses the south and west slopes of the mountain, providing an approach option.

== History ==
The mountain was named in 1894 by Theodore Solomons to honor Joachim Henry Senger (1848–1926), philologist and professor at the University of California, Berkeley, who was one of the four founders of the Sierra Club in 1892. Senger contacted John Muir with the idea of forming a local 'alpine club' for mountain lovers. Senger and San Francisco attorney Warren Olney sent out invitations "for the purpose of forming a 'Sierra Club'. Mr. John Muir will preside". On May 28, 1892, the first meeting of the Sierra Club was held to write articles of incorporation. One week later, John Muir was elected president and Warren Olney was elected vice-president. This landform's toponym has been officially adopted by the U.S. Board on Geographic Names.

The first ascent of the summit was made during the 1907–09 USGS survey by George R. Davis, T. G. Gerdine, C. F. Urquhart, and L. F. Biggs. Today this peak draws climbing interest because it is included on the Sierra Peaks Section's peak bagging list.

== Climate ==
According to the Köppen climate classification system, Mount Senger is located in an alpine climate zone. Most weather fronts originate in the Pacific Ocean, and travel east toward the Sierra Nevada mountains. As fronts approach, they are forced upward by the peaks (orographic lift), causing them to drop their moisture in the form of rain or snowfall onto the range. Precipitation runoff from this mountain drains into tributaries of the South Fork San Joaquin River.

== Gallery ==
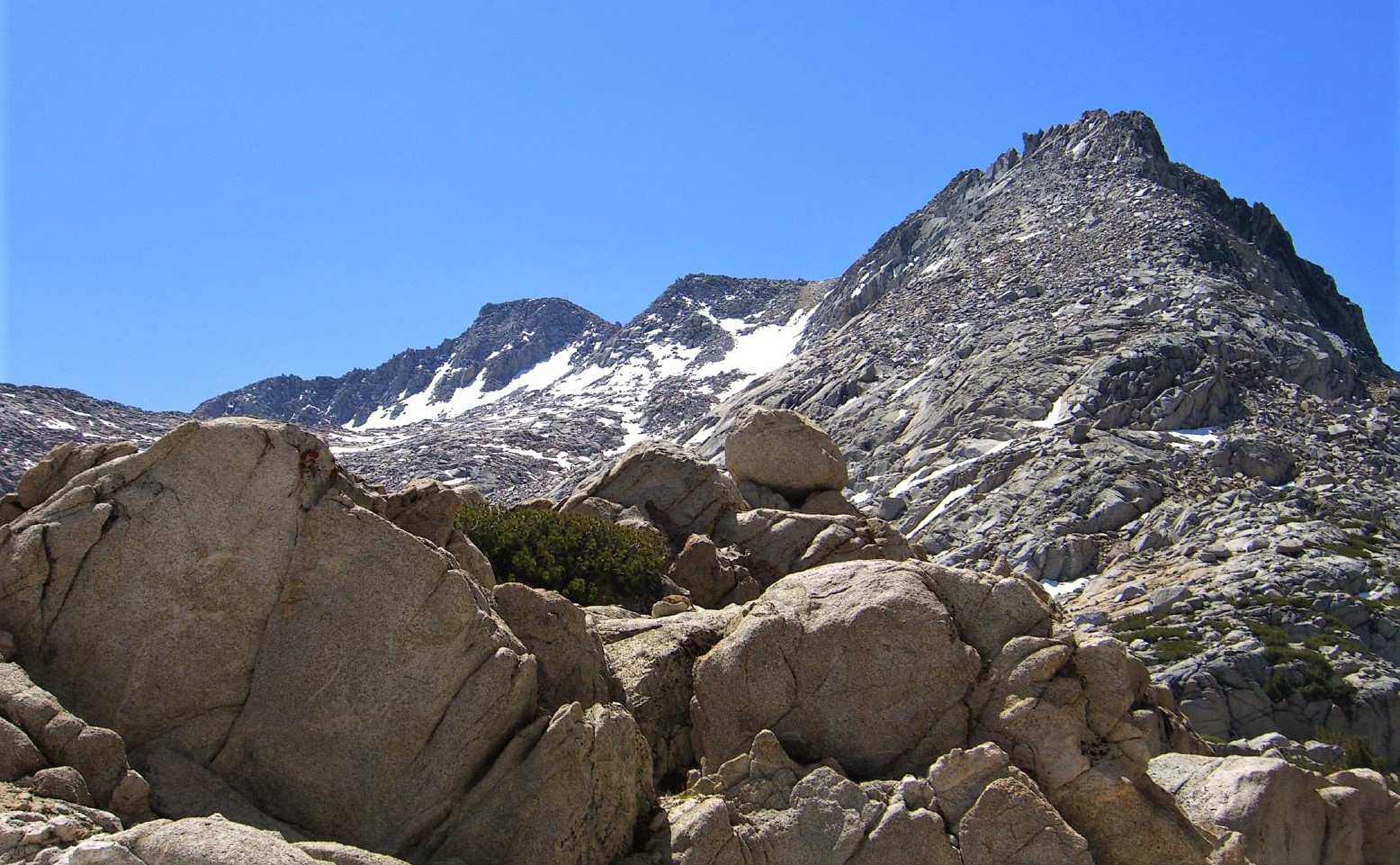
Senger from Selden Pass. Summit to left of center.

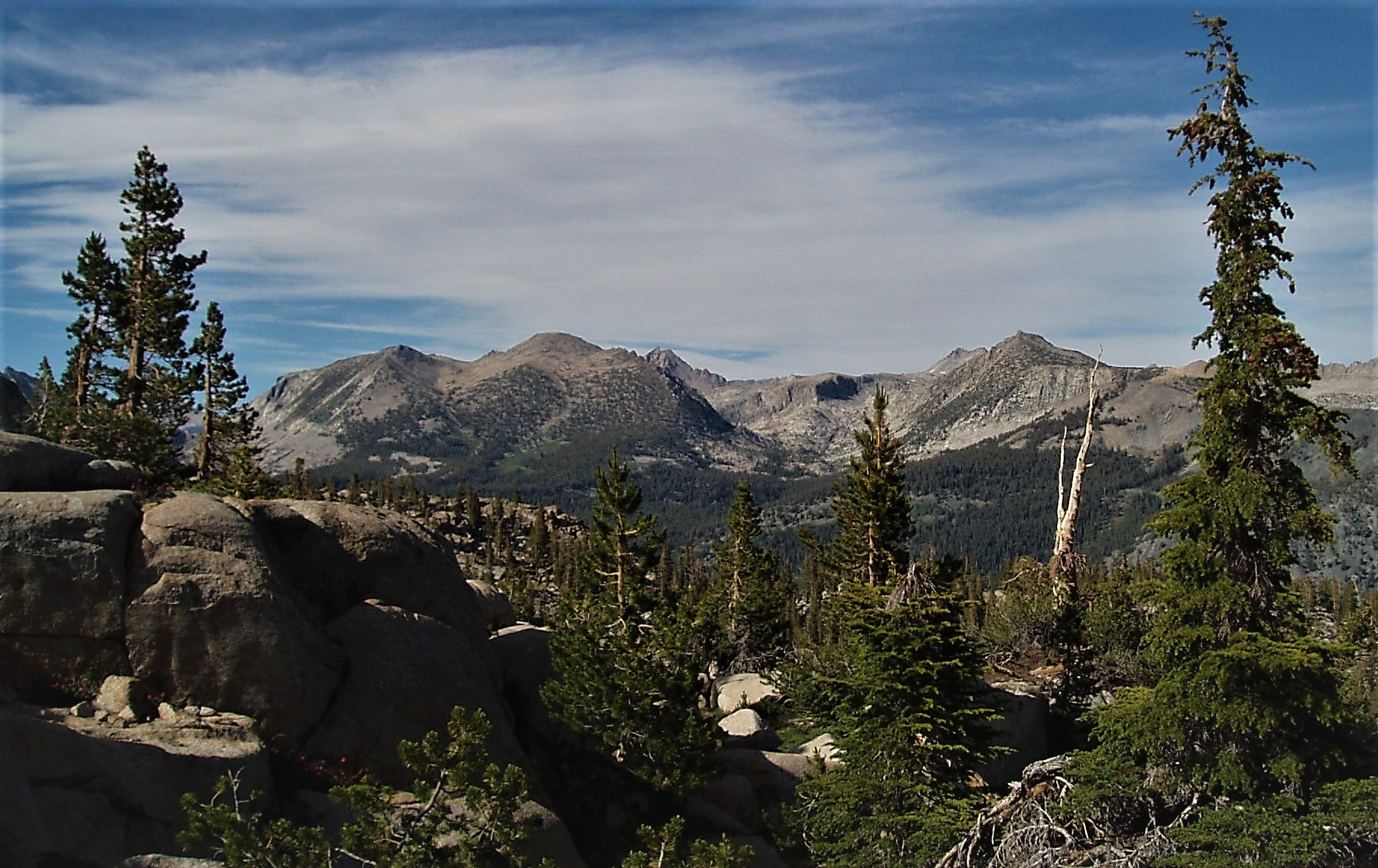
South aspects of Mt. Senger (left) and Turret Peak (right)

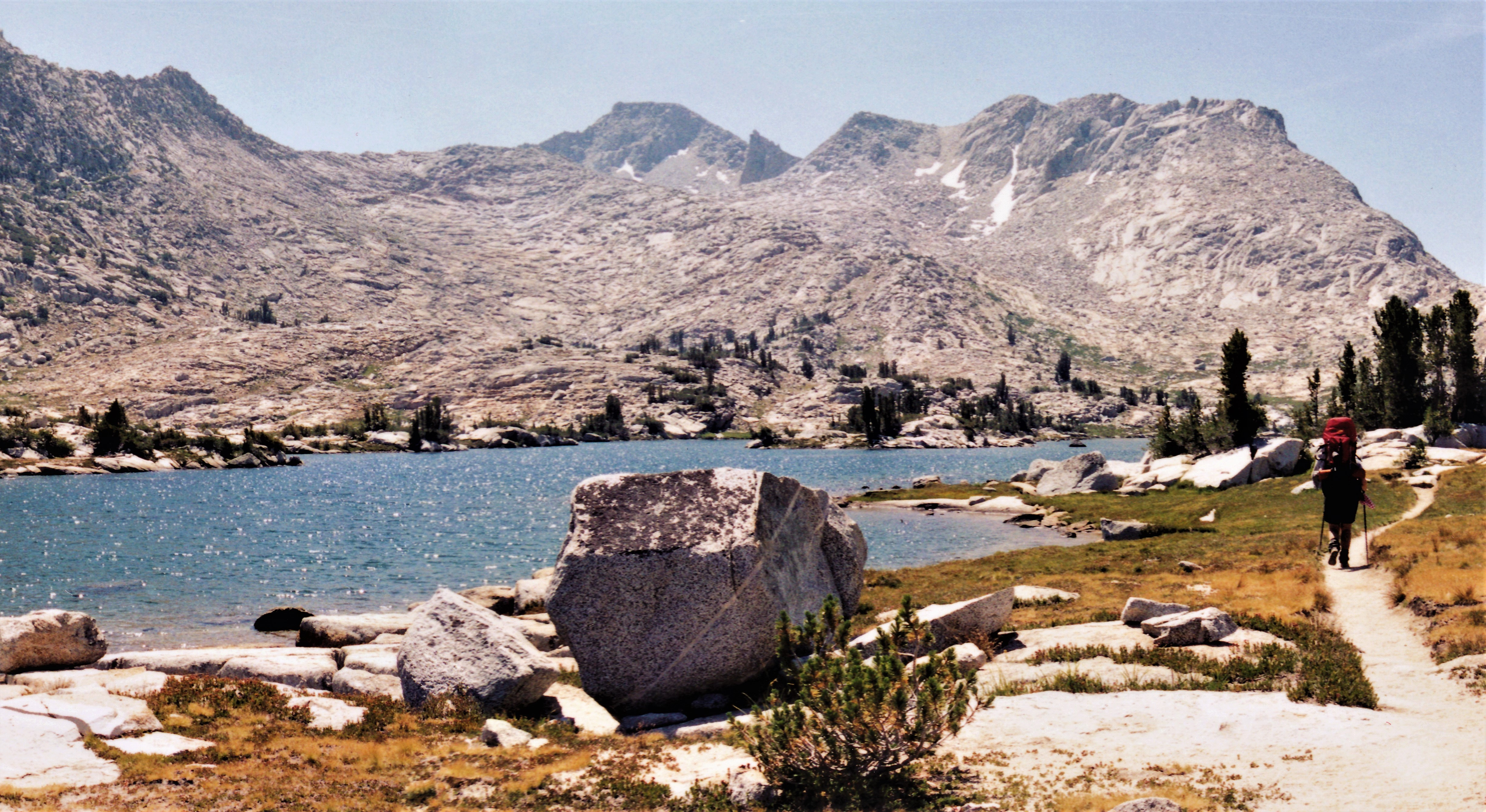
Mt. Sanger from JMT at Marie Lake.

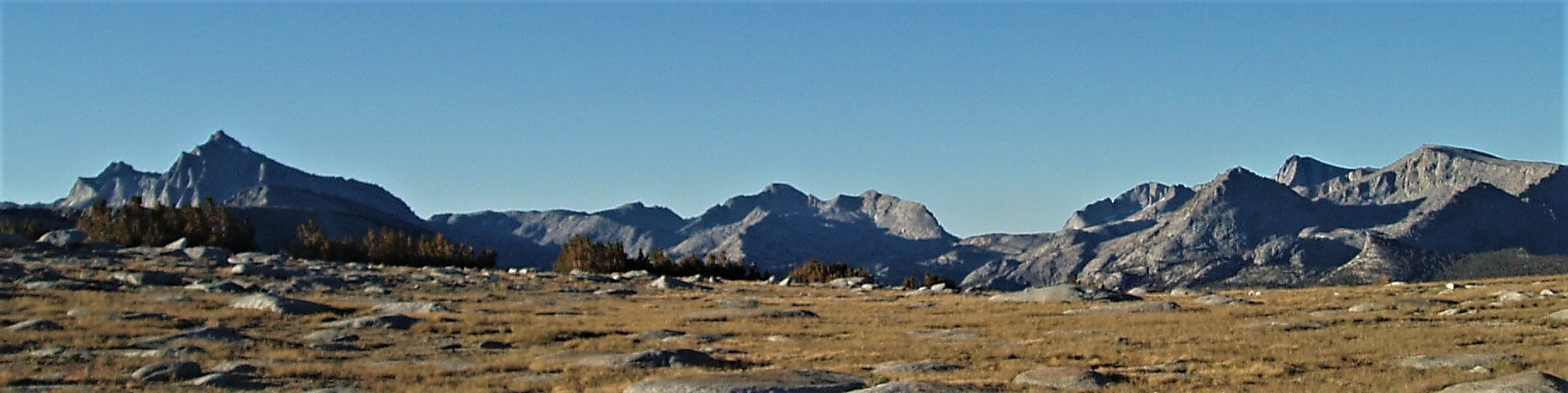
Seven Gables (left), Mount Senger (center), Mt. Hooper (right, in back)

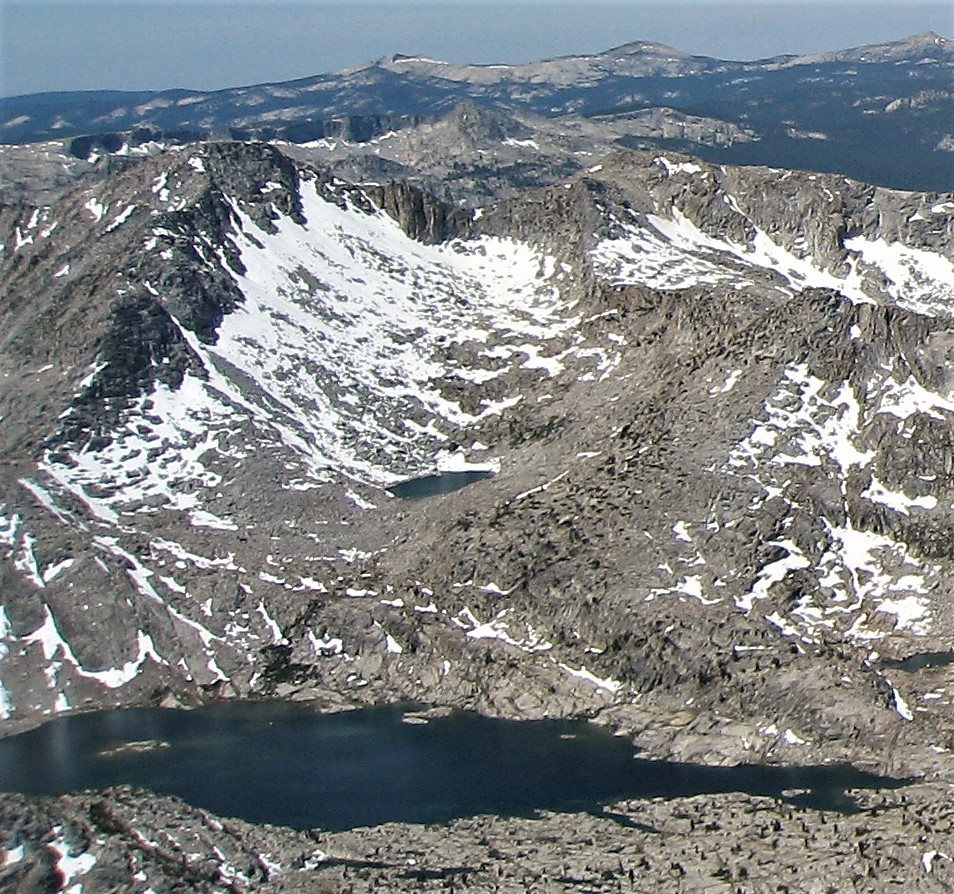
Northeast aspect seen from Seven Gables, with Three Island Lake below.

== See also ==
- List of mountain peaks of California
