= Gemini (California mountain) =

Mountain in California, United States

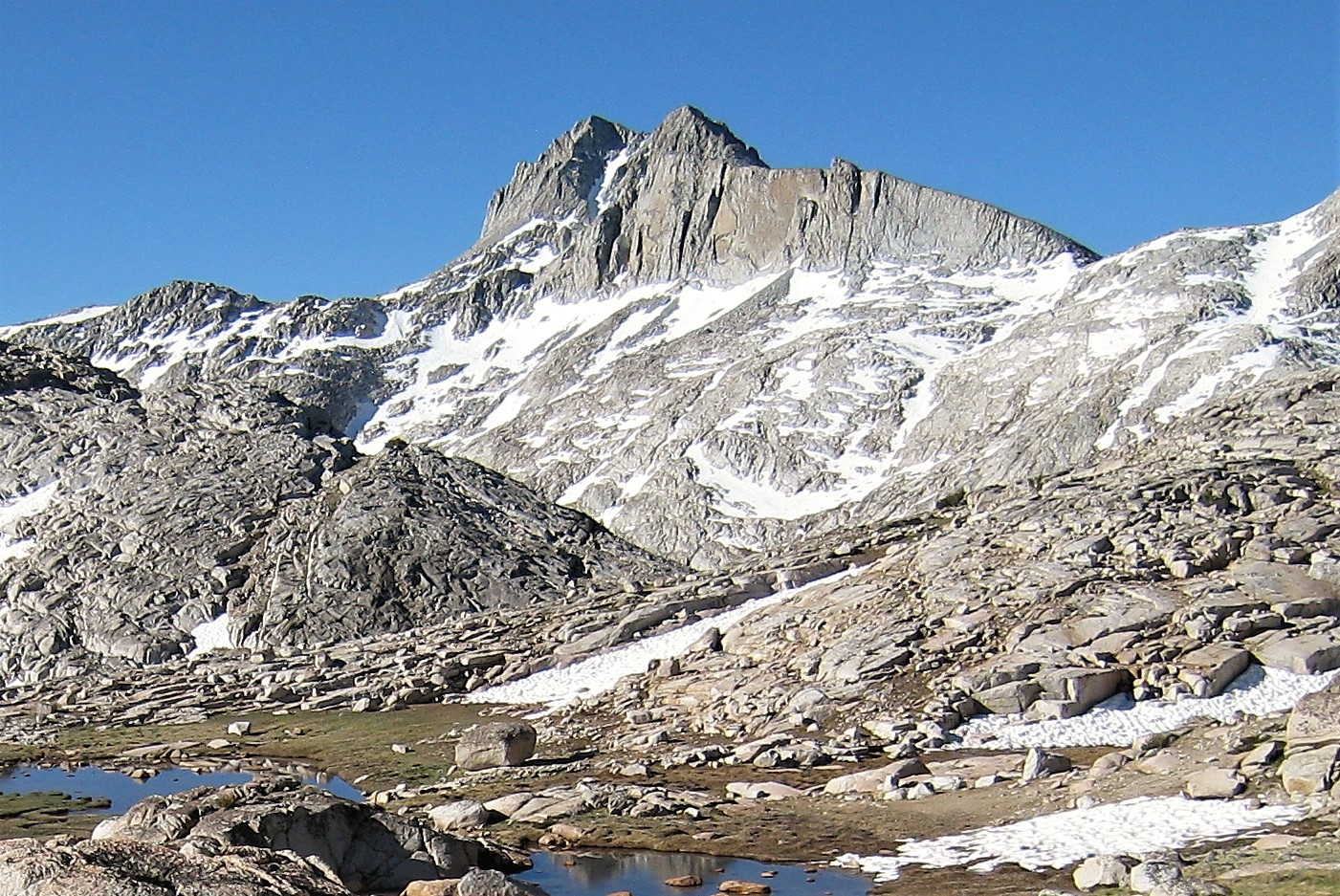
- North aspect

Highest point
- Elevation: 12,880 ft (3,926 m)
- Prominence: 800 ft (244 m)
- Parent peak: Seven Gables (13,080 ft)
- Isolation: 1.30 mi (2.09 km)
- Listing: Sierra Peaks Section
- Coordinates: 37°17′48″N 118°49′01″W

Naming
- Etymology: Gemini twins

Geography
- Location within California Location within the United States
- Country: United States
- State: California
- County: Fresno
- Protected area: John Muir Wilderness
- Parent range: Sierra Nevada
- Topo map: USGS Mount Hilgard

Geology
- Rock age: Cretaceous
- Mountain type: Fault block
- Rock type: granite

Climbing
- First ascent: 1953
- Easiest route: class 2

Gemini is a 12,880-foot-elevation (3,926-meter) twin-peaked mountain summit located west of the crest of the Sierra Nevada mountain range in Fresno County of northern California, United States. It is situated in the John Muir Wilderness, on land managed by Sierra National Forest. It is set 3.0 miles (4.8 km) west-southwest of Merriam Peak, 2.6 miles (4.2 km) northeast of Mount Senger, and 1.2 miles (1.9 km) southeast of Seven Gables, the nearest higher neighbor. Topographic relief is significant as it rises over 3,500 feet (1,067 meters) above Piute Canyon in approximately three miles. Gemini ranks as the 176th-highest summit in California.

== History ==
The first ascent of the summit was made July 30, 1953, by Jim Koontz and Rosemarie Lenel. The mountain's name was suggested by Chester Versteeg, a prominent Sierra Club mountaineer from Los Angeles. The peak's name was officially adopted in 1954 by the U.S. Board on Geographic Names and promulgated in 1957. Today this peak draws climbing interest because it is included on the Sierra Peaks Section's peak bagging list.

== Climate ==
According to the Köppen climate classification system, Gemini is located in an alpine climate zone. Most weather fronts originate in the Pacific Ocean, and travel east toward the Sierra Nevada mountains. As fronts approach, they are forced upward by the peaks, causing them to drop their moisture in the form of rain or snowfall onto the range (orographic lift). Precipitation runoff from this mountain drains into tributaries of the South Fork San Joaquin River.

== See also ==
- List of mountain peaks of California

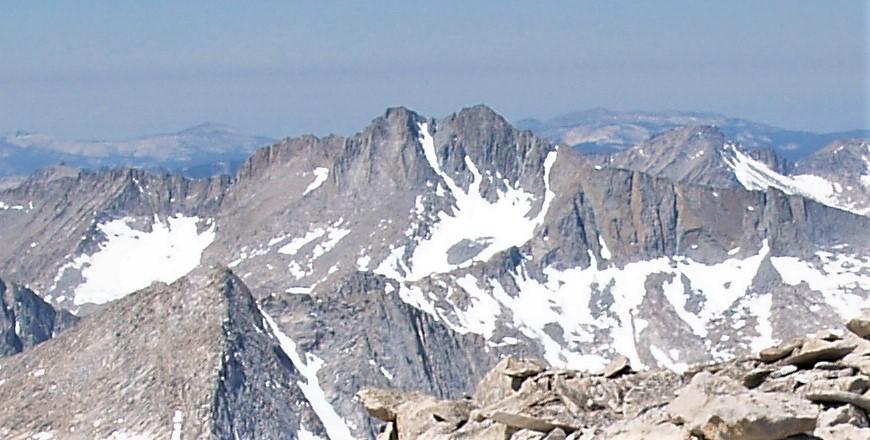
Gemini seen from Feather Peak
