= Merriam Peak (California) =

Mountain summit in California

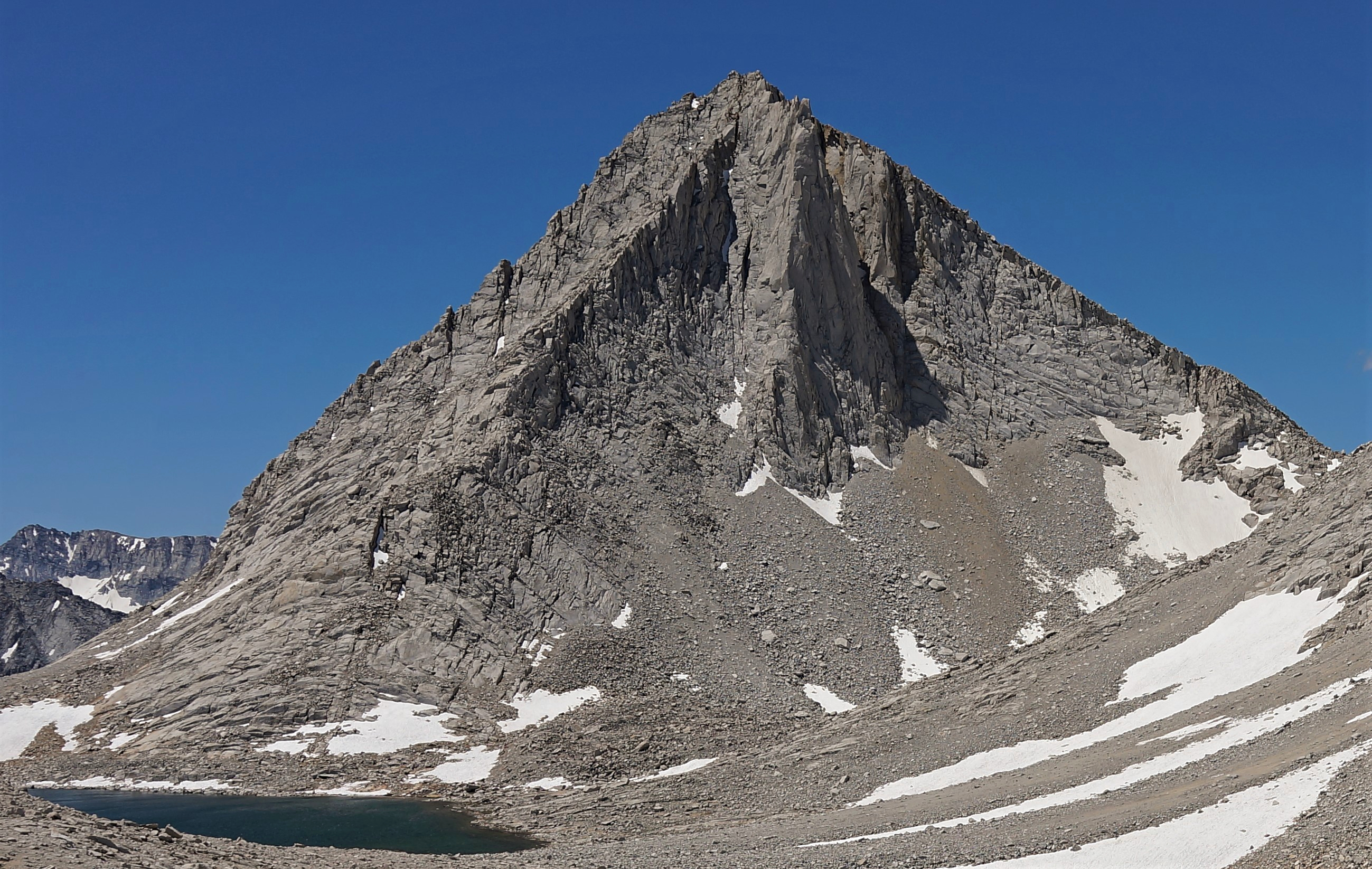
- North aspect

Highest point
- Elevation: 13,103 ft (3,994 m)
- Prominence: 863 ft (263 m)
- Parent peak: Royce Peak (13,300 ft)
- Isolation: 0.69 mi (1.11 km)
- Listing: Sierra Peaks Section
- Coordinates: 37°18′33″N 118°45′55″W

Naming
- Etymology: Clinton Hart Merriam

Geography
- Location within California Location within the United States
- Location: Fresno County; California, U.S.
- Parent range: Sierra Nevada
- Topo map: USGS Mount Hilgard

Geology
- Rock type: granitic

Climbing
- First ascent: July 14, 1933
- Easiest route: class 2+ Royce-Merriam saddle

Merriam Peak is a 13,103-foot-elevation (3,994-meter) mountain summit located in Fresno County in the Sierra Nevada mountain range in northern California, United States. It is situated south of the Royce Lakes and north of French Canyon, in the John Muir Wilderness, on land managed by Sierra National Forest. It is set 0.7 miles (1.1 km) south-southeast of Royce Peak, the nearest higher neighbor. Merriam Peak is the 129th highest summit in California. Topographic relief is significant as it rises approximately 3,000 feet (910 meters) above French Canyon in one mile. This mountain was named in 1929 by the California State Geographic Board, and officially adopted in 1930 by the U.S. Board on Geographic Names to honor Dr. Clinton Hart Merriam (1855–1942), an American zoologist and naturalist, who served on the U.S. Board on Geographic Names from 1914 through 1925.

== Climate ==
According to the Köppen climate classification system, Merriam Peak is located in an alpine climate zone. Most weather fronts originate in the Pacific Ocean, and travel east toward the Sierra Nevada mountains. As fronts approach, they are forced upward by the peaks, causing them to drop their moisture in the form of rain or snowfall onto the range (orographic lift). Precipitation runoff from this mountain drains south into tributaries of the South Fork San Joaquin River.

== Climbing ==
The first ascent of the summit was made July 14, 1933, by Sierra Club members Lewis Clark, Julie Mortimer, and Ted Waller. They called it "Bastille Peak" in honor of the July 14th French holiday, Bastille Day, unaware that it had previously been named. Class 3 scrambles can be made via the east, south, and southwest aspects. The North Buttress is considered one of the classic climbing routes in the Sierra Nevada.

Established rock climbing routes:

- North Buttress – class 5.10 – 1976 by Vern Clevenger, Bob Harrington
- The Flying Buttress – class 5.11b – 2011 by Peter Croft, Lisa Rands
- Gargoyle – class 5.11b – 2011 by Peter Croft, Lisa Rands

== Gallery ==
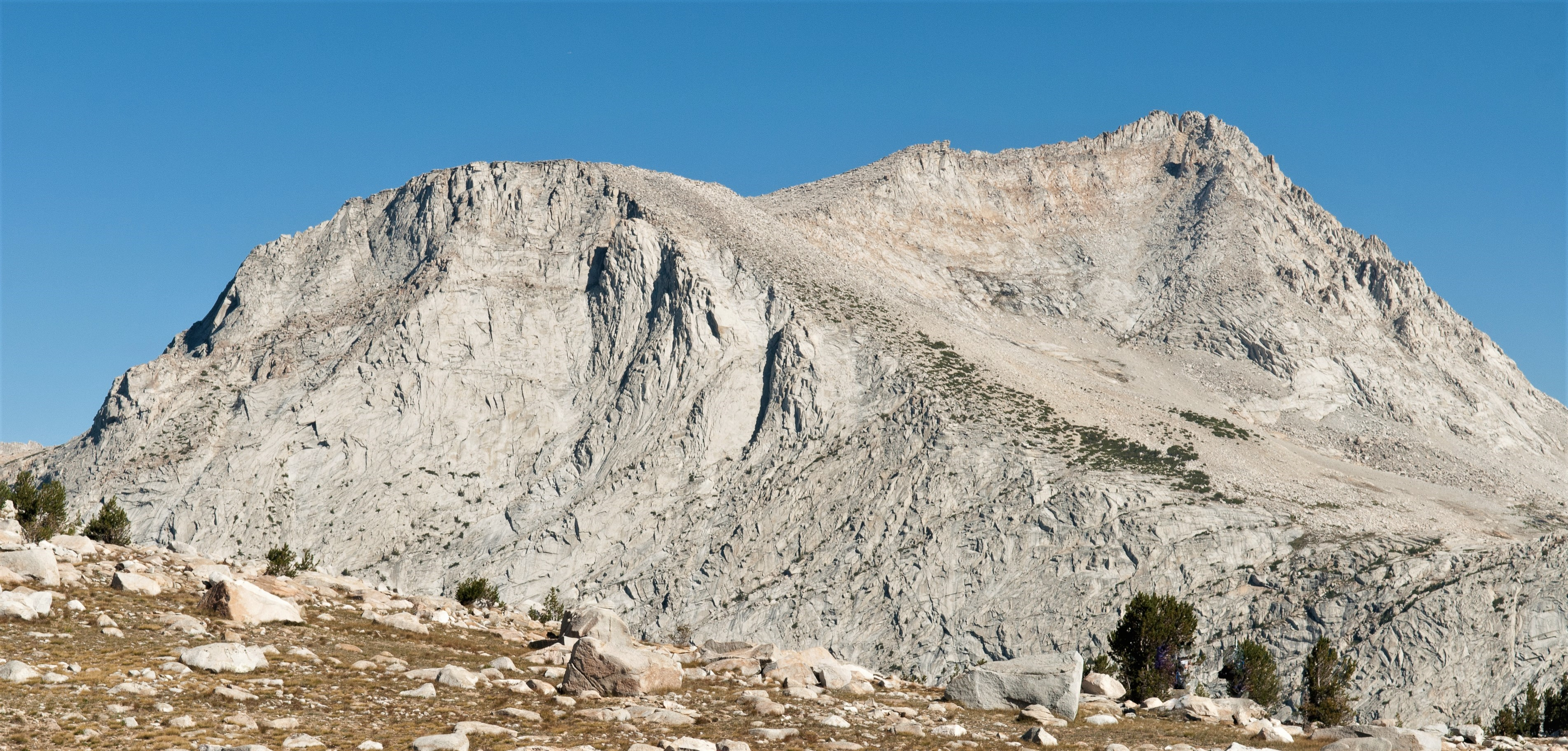
Southeast aspect

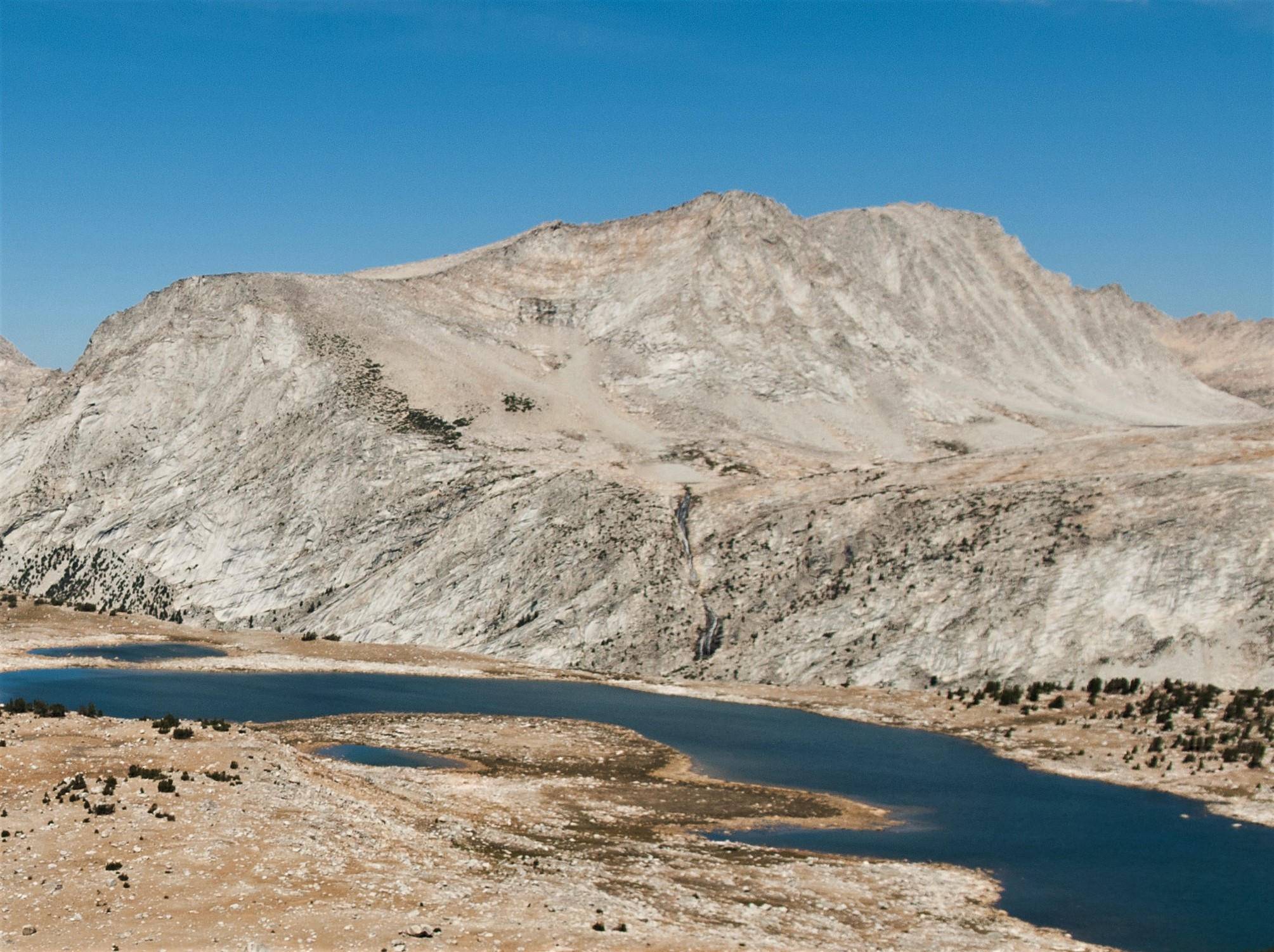
Merriam Peak (center) with Royce Peak behind, right. Puppet Lake in foreground. Camera pointed northwest.

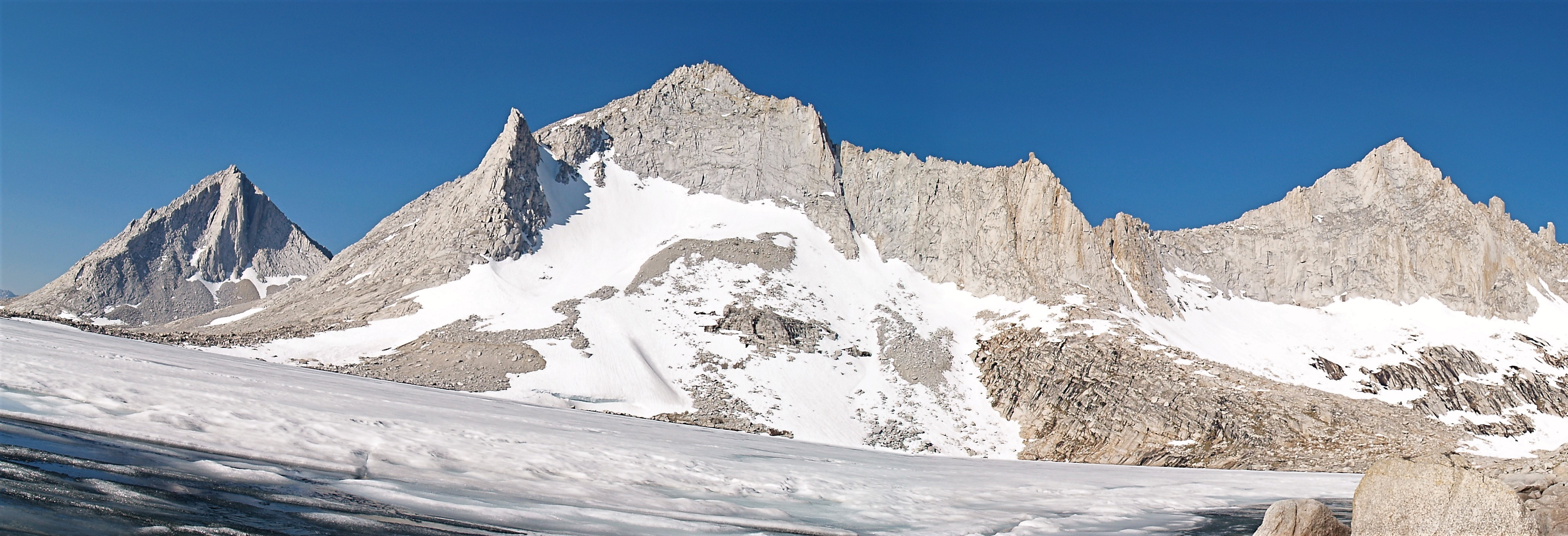
Merriam Peak (left) with Royce Peak (centered), and Feather Peak (right)

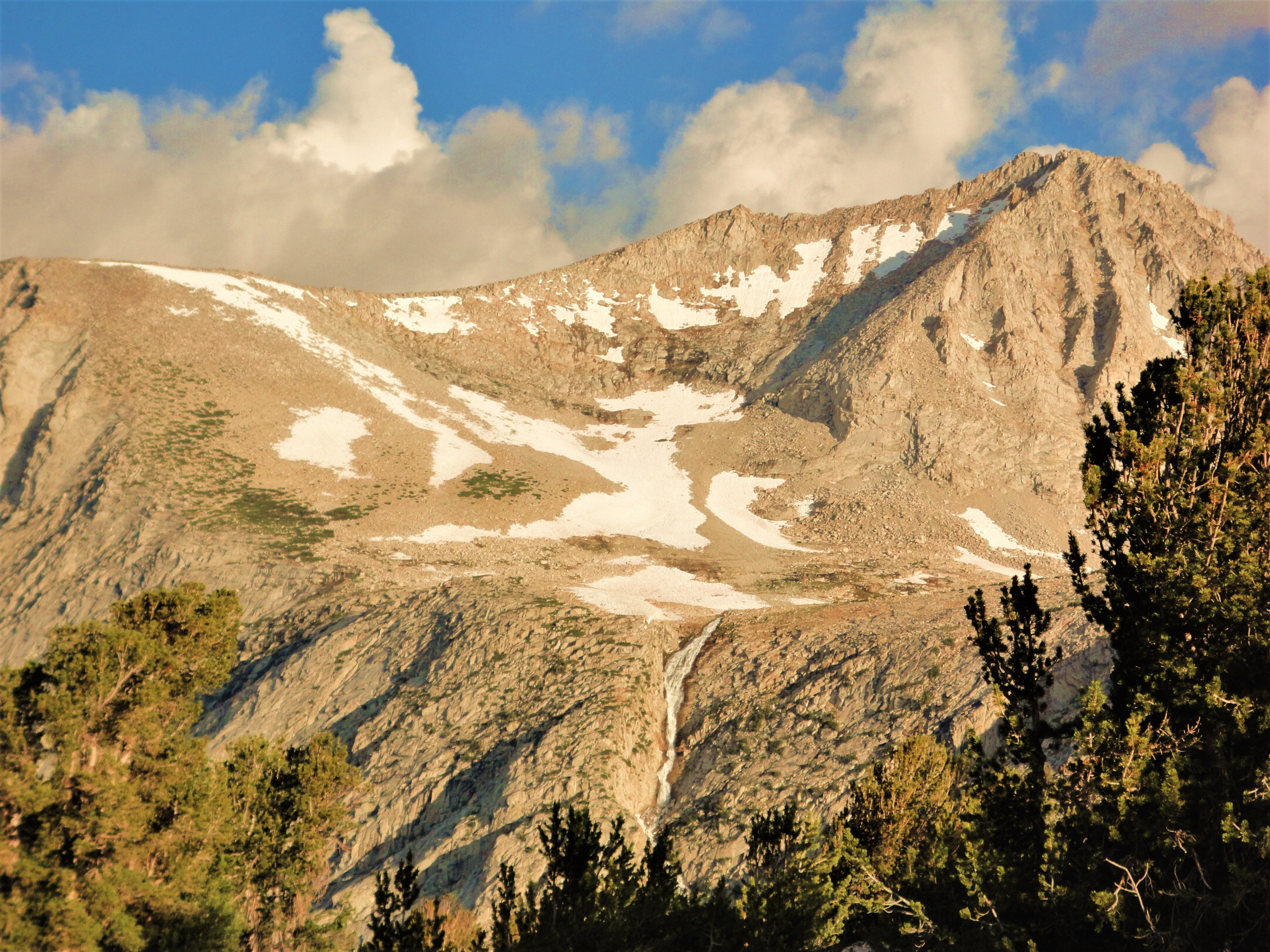
East aspect of Merriam Peak with waterfall plunging into French Canyon.

== See also ==
- List of mountain peaks of California
