= Royce Peak =

Mountain in California, United States

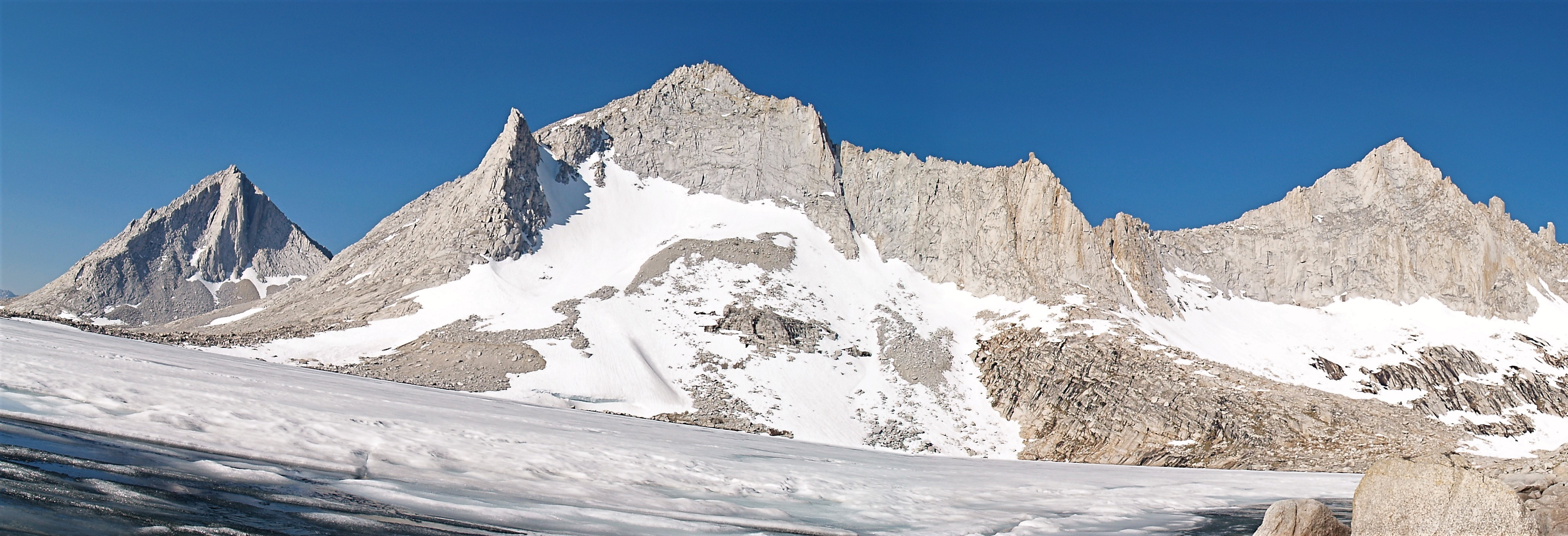
- Northeast aspect (centered) (Merriam Peak left, Feather Peak right)

Highest point
- Elevation: 13,280 ft (4,050 m)
- Prominence: 880 ft (270 m)
- Parent peak: Bear Creek Spire (13,726 ft)
- Isolation: 3.45 mi (5.55 km)
- Listing: Sierra Peaks Section
- Coordinates: 37°19′05″N 118°46′15″W

Naming
- Etymology: Josiah Royce

Geography
- Location within California Location within the United States
- Location: Fresno County; California, U.S.
- Parent range: Sierra Nevada
- Topo map: USGS Mount Hilgard

Geology
- Rock age: Cretaceous
- Mountain type: Fault block
- Rock type: granite

Climbing
- First ascent: 1931
- Easiest route: class 2 south slope

Royce Peak, also known as Mount Royce, is a 13,280-foot-elevation (4,050-meter) mountain summit located west of the Royce Lakes in the Sierra Nevada mountain range in northern California, United States. It is situated in Fresno County, in the John Muir Wilderness, on land managed by Sierra National Forest. It is set 0.66 miles (1.06 km) southeast of Feather Peak, 0.71 miles (1.14 km) north-northwest of Merriam Peak, and the nearest higher neighbor is Bear Creek Spire, 3.44 miles (5.54 km) to the north. Royce Peak is the 89th-highest summit in California. This mountain was named in 1929 by the California State Geographic Board, and later officially adopted by the U.S. Board on Geographic Names to honor Dr. Josiah Royce (1855–1916), philosopher, instructor, and author. The first ascent of the summit was made June 23, 1931, by Nathan Clark and Roy Crites.

== Climate ==
According to the Köppen climate classification system, Royce Peak is located in an alpine climate zone. Most weather fronts originate in the Pacific Ocean, and travel east toward the Sierra Nevada mountains. As fronts approach, they are forced upward by the peaks, causing them to drop their moisture in the form of rain or snowfall onto the range (orographic lift). Precipitation runoff from this mountain drains south into tributaries of the San Joaquin River.

== See also ==
- List of mountain peaks of California
