= Seven Gables =

Mountain in California, United States

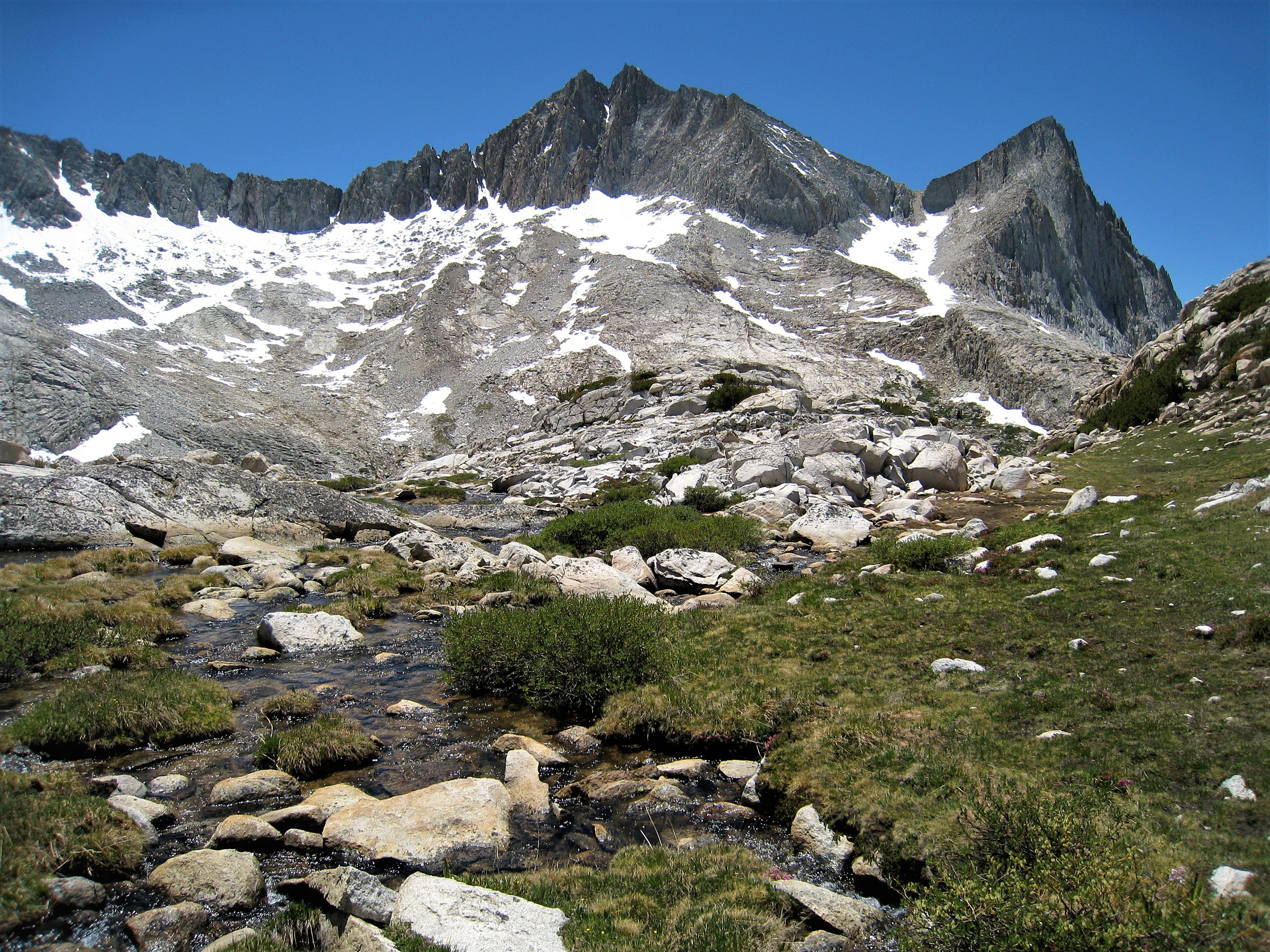
- Northeast aspect

Highest point
- Elevation: 13,080 ft (3,990 m)
- Prominence: 1,120 ft (340 m)
- Parent peak: Feather Peak (13,260 ft)
- Isolation: 3.22 mi (5.18 km)
- Listing: Sierra Peaks Section
- Coordinates: 37°18′39″N 118°50′01″W

Geography
- Location within California Location within the United States
- Location: Fresno County; California, U.S.
- Parent range: Sierra Nevada
- Topo map: USGS Mount Hilgard

Geology
- Rock age: Cretaceous
- Mountain type: Fault block
- Rock type: granite

Climbing
- First ascent: 1894
- Easiest route: class 3

Seven Gables is a 13,080-foot-elevation (3,990-meter) mountain summit located in the Sierra Nevada mountain range in Fresno County of northern California, United States. It is situated between the east and south forks of Bear Creek in the John Muir Wilderness, on land managed by Sierra National Forest. It is set 9 miles (14 km) southeast of Lake Thomas A Edison, 1.2 miles (1.9 km) northwest of Gemini, and 3.2 miles (5.1 km) west-southwest of Feather Peak, the nearest higher neighbor. Topographic relief is significant as it rises nearly 3,500 feet (1,100 meters) above Upper Bear Creek Meadows in approximately two miles. Seven Gables ranks as the 133rd highest summit in California.

== History ==
The first ascent of the summit was made September 20, 1894, by Theodore Solomons and Leigh Bierce. Solomons also named it: "The south wall of the gap we found to be the side of a peak, the eccentric shape of which is suggested in the name Seven Gables, which we hastened to fasten upon it". Impressed by the superlative view from the summit, Solomons wrote: "I was too awed to shout. The ideas represented by such words as lovely, beautiful, wild or terrible, cold or desolate, fail to compass it. Words are puny things, and the language of description quite as impotent as the painter's brush. Roughly speaking, one might say that the sight was sublime and awful."

Joseph Nisbet LeConte and Clarence L. Cory climbed it on June 29, 1898, placing a Sierra Club register at the summit. The class 5.9 Direct East Face, considered one of the classic climbing routes in the Sierra Nevada, was first climbed in 1981 by Claude Fiddler and Vern Clevenger. Galen Rowell put up a new route in 1988. This mountain's name has been officially adopted by the U.S. Board on Geographic Names. Today this peak draws interest because it is on the Sierra Peaks Section's Mountaineers Peaks peak bagging list.

== Climate ==
According to the Köppen climate classification system, Seven Gables is located in an alpine climate zone. Most weather fronts originate in the Pacific Ocean, and travel east toward the Sierra Nevada mountains. As fronts approach, they are forced upward by the peaks, causing them to drop their moisture in the form of rain or snowfall onto the range (orographic lift). Precipitation runoff from this mountain drains into Bear Creek, a tributary of the South Fork San Joaquin River.

== Gallery ==
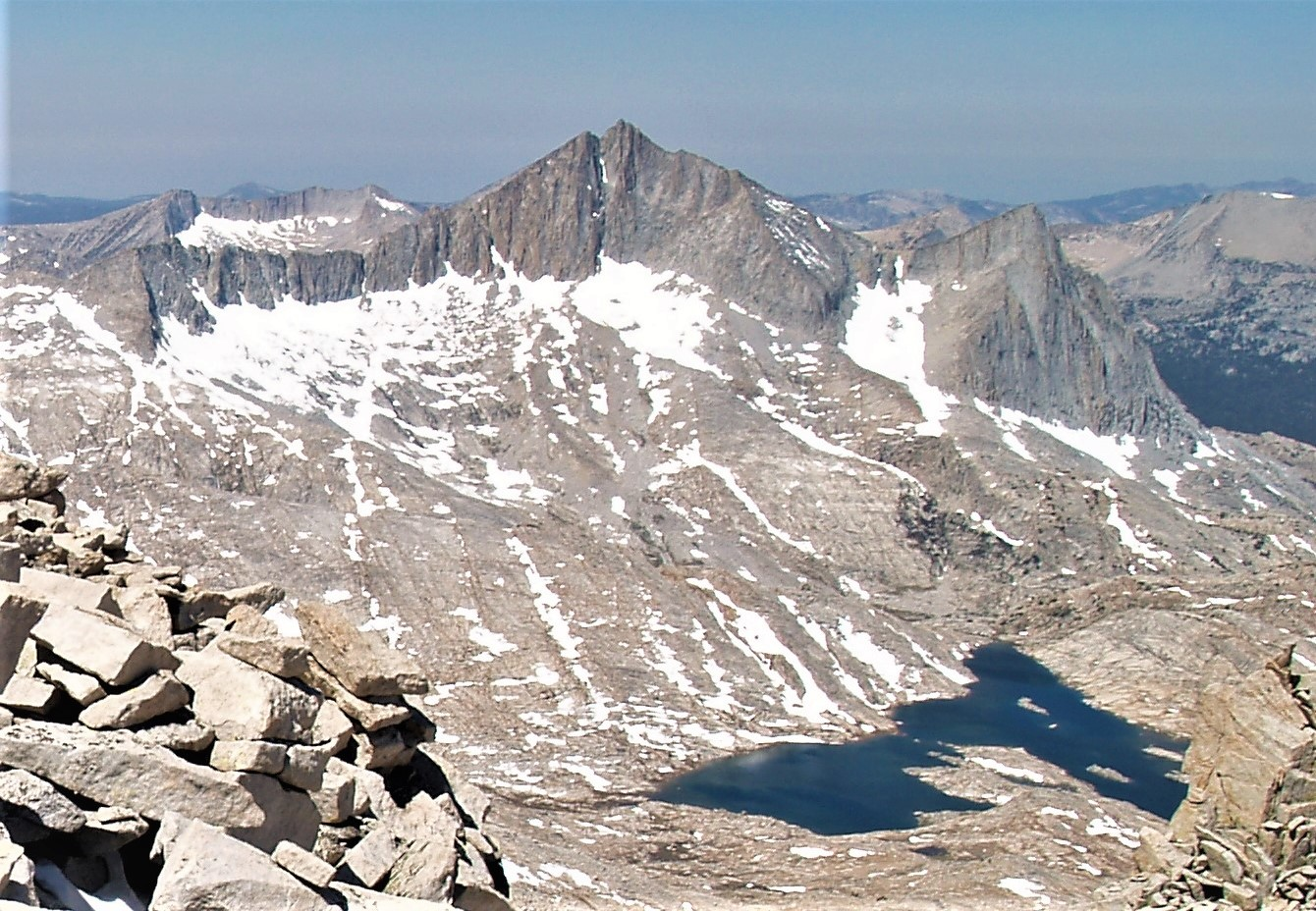
Seven Gables from Feather Peak. Vee Lake lower right.

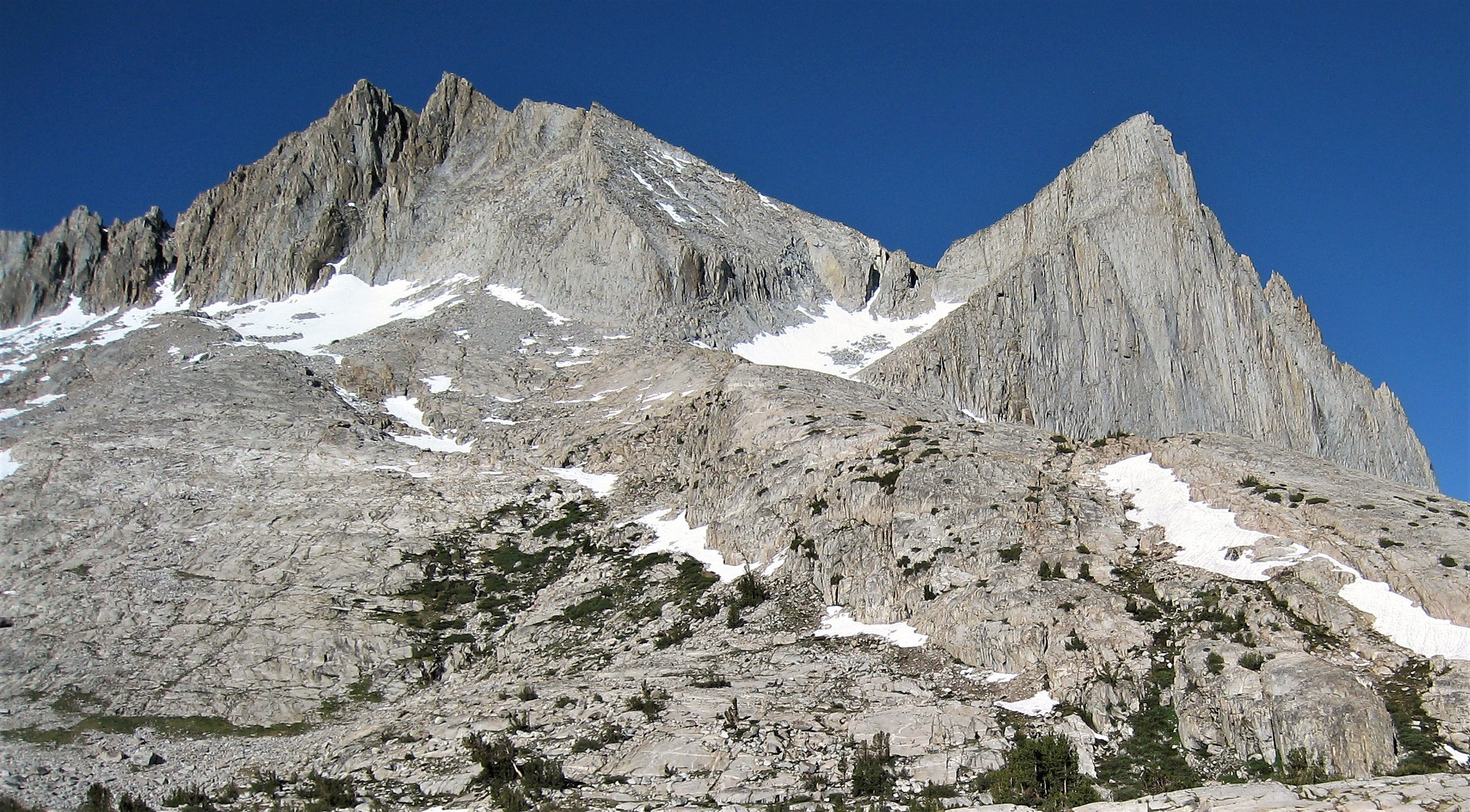
Northeast aspect

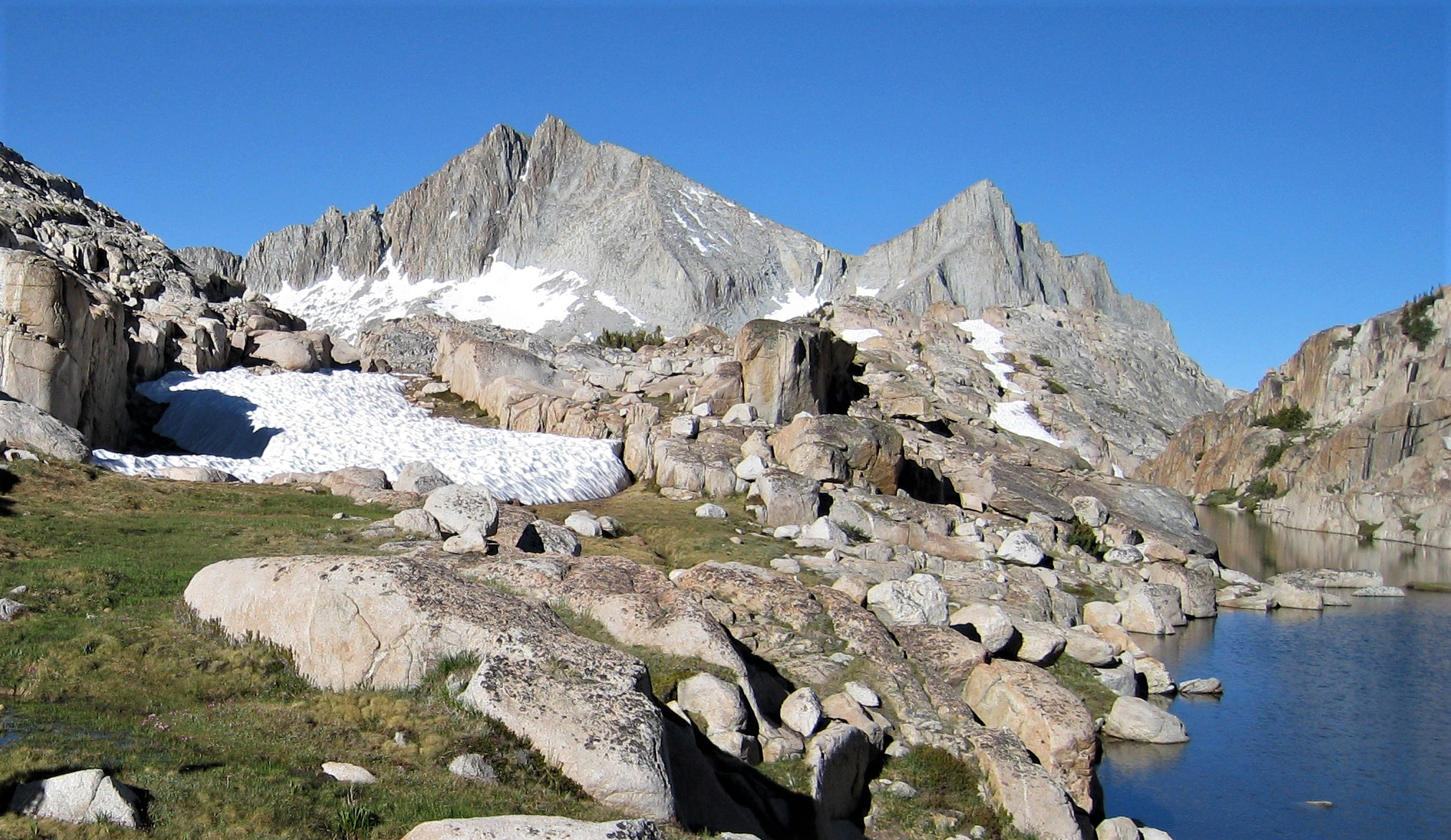

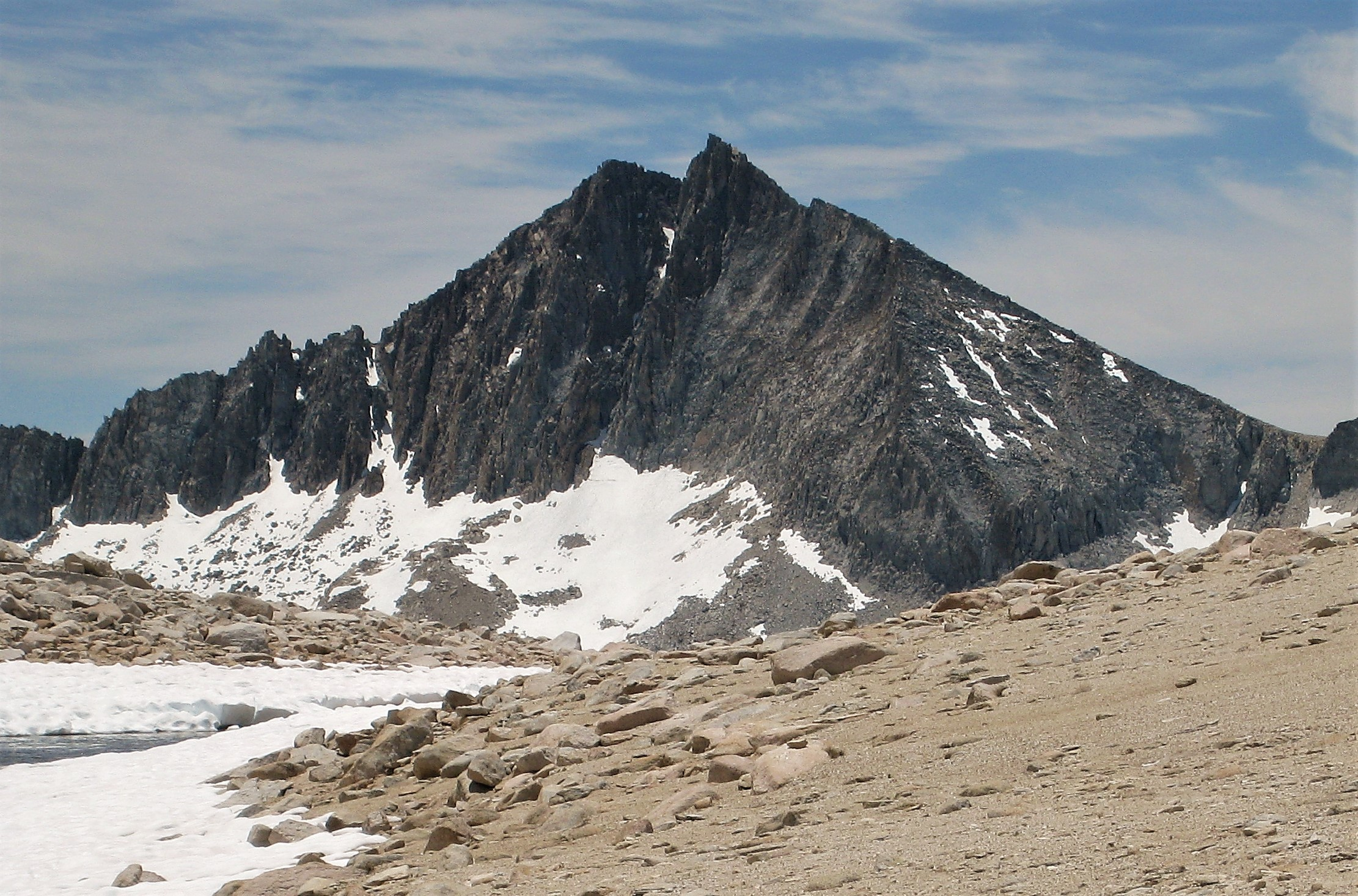

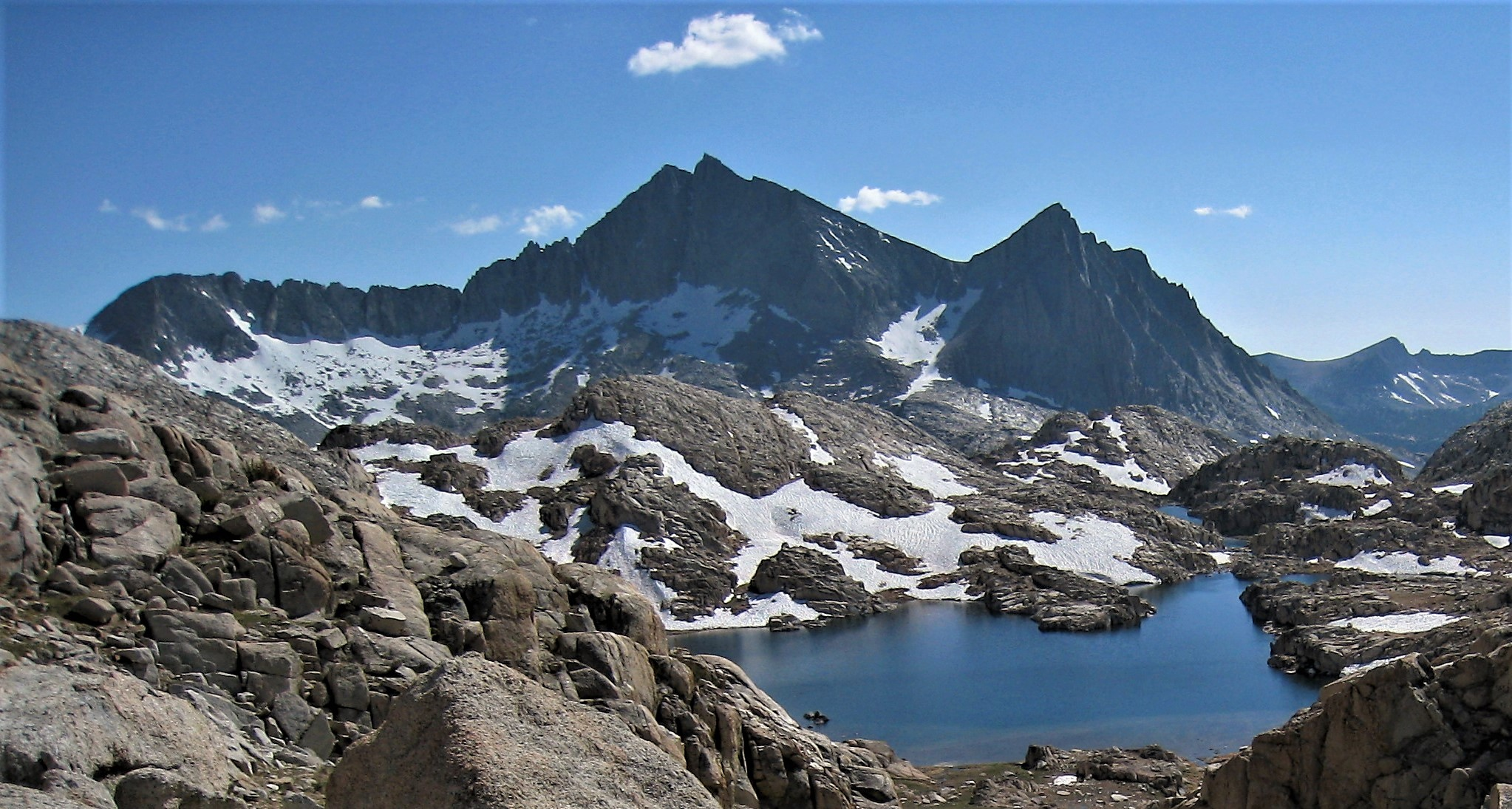

== See also ==
- List of mountain peaks of California
