= Feather Peak =

Mountain in California, United States

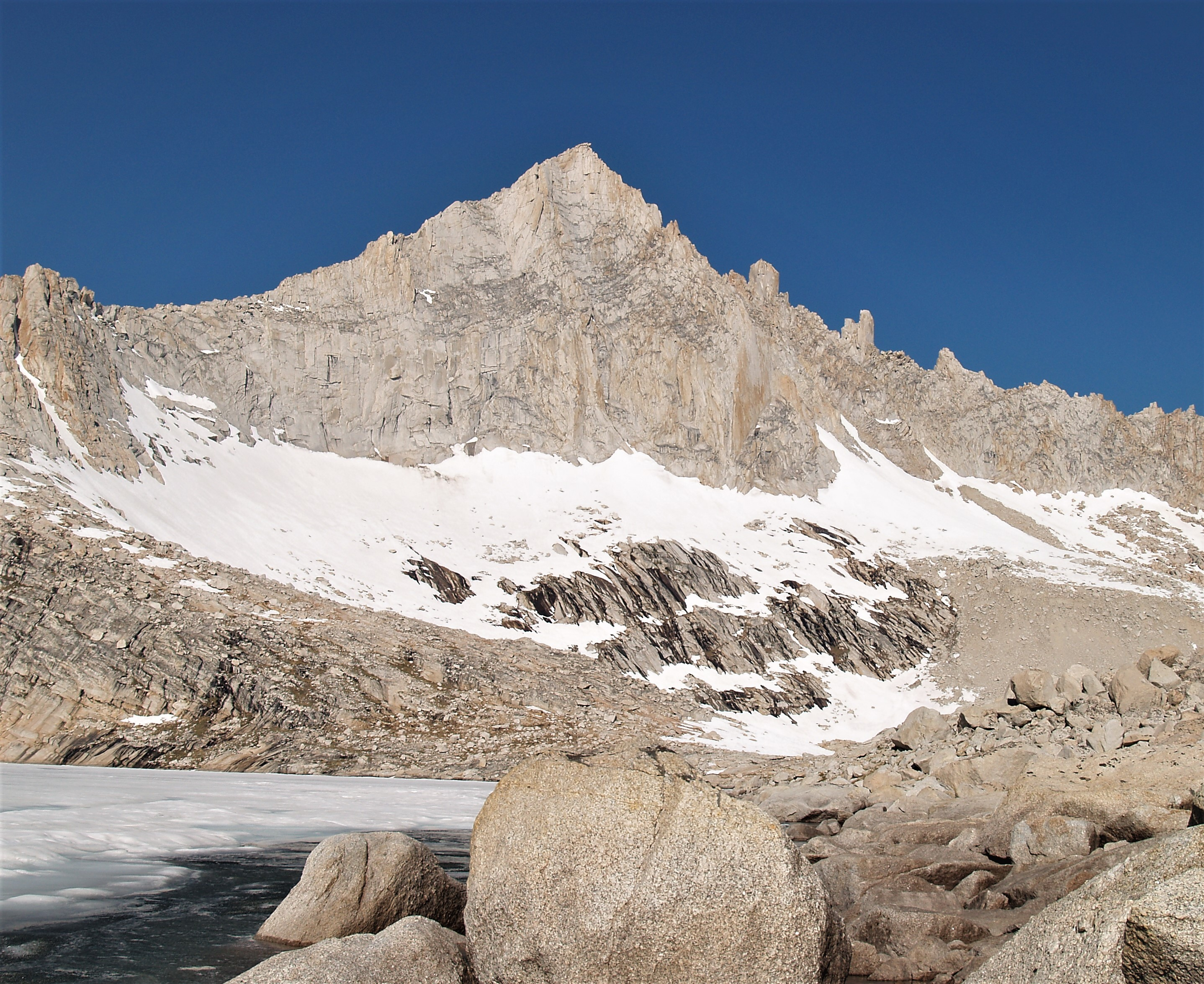
- East aspect

Highest point
- Elevation: 13,240 ft (4,040 m)
- Prominence: 720 ft (220 m)
- Parent peak: Royce Peak (13,280 ft)
- Isolation: 0.67 mi (1.08 km)
- Coordinates: 37°19′32″N 118°46′42″W

Geography
- Location within California Location within the United States
- Country: United States
- State: California
- County: Fresno
- Protected area: John Muir Wilderness
- Parent range: Sierra Nevada
- Topo map: USGS Mount Hilgard

Geology
- Rock age: Mesozoic
- Rock type: granite

Climbing
- First ascent: 1933
- Easiest route: class 3 south slope

Feather Peak is a 13,240-foot-elevation (4,040-meter) mountain summit located west of the Royce Lakes in the Sierra Nevada mountain range in northern California, United States. It is situated in Fresno County, in the John Muir Wilderness, on land managed by Sierra National Forest. It is set 3.2 miles (5.1 km) east-northeast of Seven Gables, and 0.66 miles (1.06 km) northwest of Royce Peak, which is the nearest higher neighbor. Feather Peak ranks as the 99th-highest summit in California. The first ascent of the summit was made in July 1933 by David Brower, who also named this peak.

== Climate ==
According to the Köppen climate classification system, Feather Peak is located in an alpine climate zone. Most weather fronts originate in the Pacific Ocean, and travel east toward the Sierra Nevada mountains. As fronts approach, they are forced upward by the peaks, causing them to drop their moisture in the form of rain or snowfall onto the range (orographic lift). Precipitation runoff from this mountain drains south into tributaries of the San Joaquin River.

== Climbing ==
Established climbing routes on Feather Peak:

- Southeast Slope – class 3 – First Ascent 1933
- Southwest Ridge – class 4
- Northeast Face – class 5.9 – 10 pitches – FA 1966
- Feather Couloir (North Couloir) – class AI2 – 4 pitches
- North Ridge – class 5.4 – FA 1992

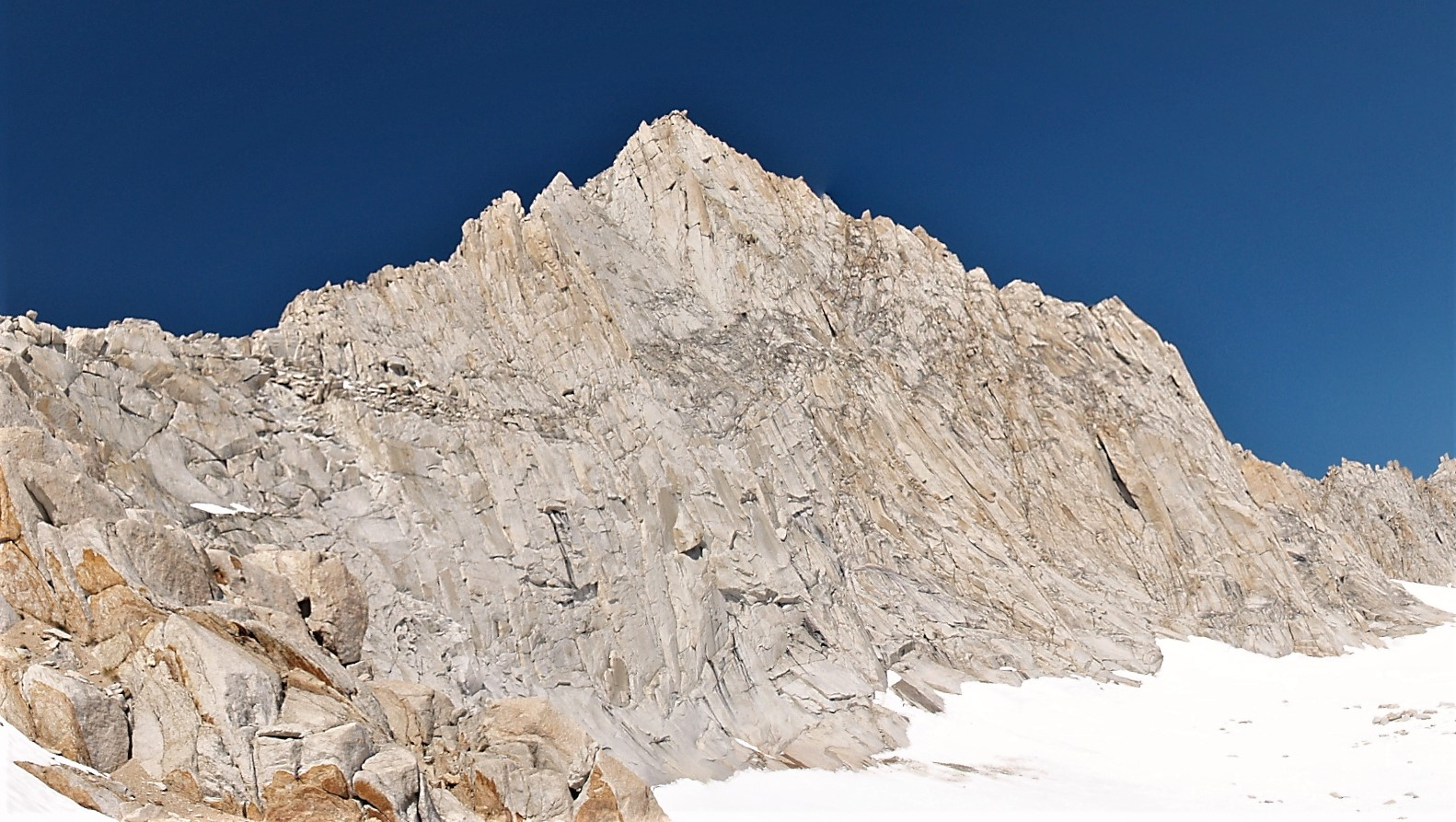
Feather Peak

== See also ==
- List of mountain peaks of California
