= Mount Solomons =

Mountain in the state of California

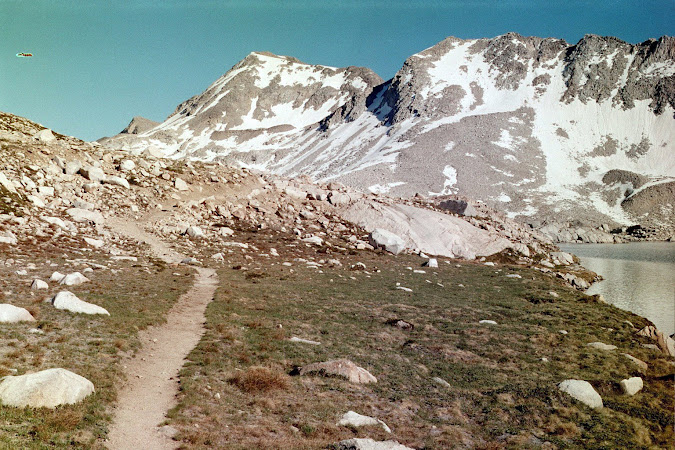
- Mount Solomons (center left) from the John Muir Trail

Highest point
- Elevation: 13,040 ft (3,975 m) NAVD 88
- Prominence: 554 ft (169 m)
- Coordinates: 37°06′23″N 118°40′26″W

Geography
- Location within California Location within the United States
- Location: Fresno County, Kings Canyon National Park, California, U.S.
- Parent range: Sierra Nevada

Climbing
- First ascent: 1929 by M.H. Pramme and T.F. Harms
- Easiest route: Scramble, class 2

Mount Solomons is a peak in the Sierra Nevada mountain range in the U.S. state of California. It rises to 13,040 feet (3,975 m) directly above Muir Pass. Mount Solomons was named after Theodore Solomons, an explorer of the Sierra Nevada mountains, who mapped and established what is now the northern half of John Muir Trail.

The peak is on the Goddard Divide in Kings Canyon National Park and overlooks Evolution Basin. A scramble from the Muir trail at Muir pass leads to the summit.

== See also ==
- Mount Goddard
- Black Giant
