= Martha Lake (California) =

Lake of the United States of America

Lake Martha
- Location within California Location within the United States
- Location: Kings Canyon National Park, Fresno County, California, US
- Coordinates: 37°05′40″N 118°44′18″W
- Primary outflows: South Fork San Joaquin River
- Basin countries: United States of America
- Surface elevation: 11,010 feet (3,356 m)

Lake Martha is a lake in Kings Canyon National Park, on the Le Conte Divide, 1.0 mile (1.6 km) north of Mount Reinstein and 1.2 miles (1.9 km) southwest of Mount Goddard. Lake Martha is notable for being the source of the south fork of the San Joaquin River. It is also on the easiest route to Hell for Sure Pass. Due to its elevation, it can be completely frozen at high summer (August).

== See also ==
- List of lakes in California
