= Peter Peak (California) =

Mountain in California, United States

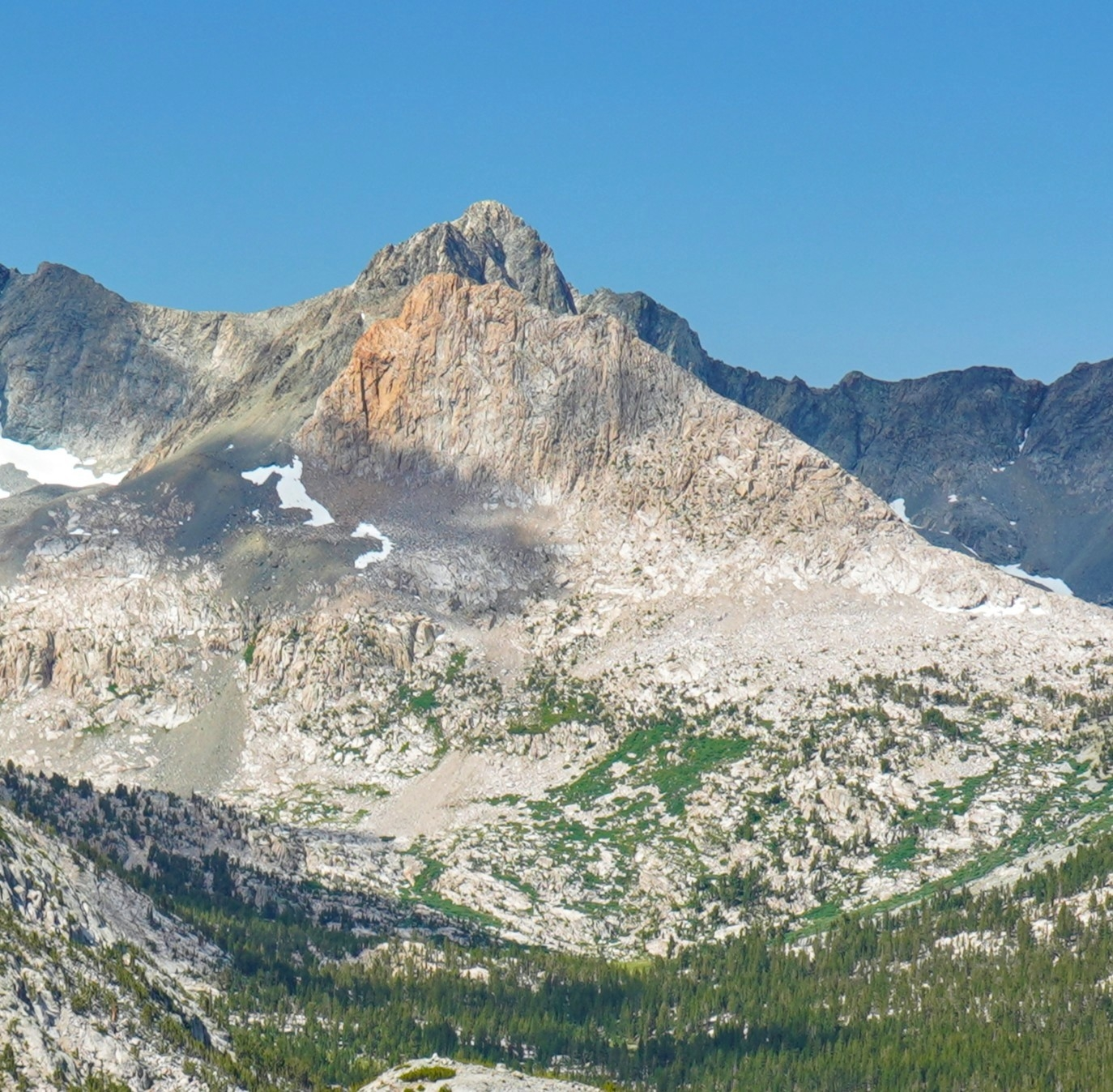
- Northeast aspect

Highest point
- Elevation: 12,490 ft (3,810 m)
- Prominence: 310 ft (94 m)
- Parent peak: Mount McGee (12,944 ft)
- Isolation: 0.62 mi (1.00 km)
- Coordinates: 37°08′44″N 118°44′45″W

Naming
- Etymology: Peter Grubb

Geography
- Location within California Location within the United States
- Country: United States
- State: California
- County: Fresno
- Protected area: Kings Canyon National Park
- Parent range: Sierra Nevada
- Topo map: USGS Mount Darwin

Geology
- Rock type: metamorphic

Climbing
- First ascent: July 11, 1936; Peter Grubb, Richard G. Johnson
- Easiest route: class 2

Peter Peak is a 12,490-foot-elevation (3,810-meter) mountain summit located west of the crest of the Sierra Nevada mountain range, in Fresno County of central California, United States. It is situated in northern Kings Canyon National Park, 2 miles (3.2 km) southwest of The Hermit, and 0.6 miles (0.97 km) northwest of Mount McGee, the nearest higher neighbor. Topographic relief is significant as the west aspect rises 2,900 feet (880 meters) above Goddard Canyon in 1.5 mile. The John Muir Trail passes to the east, providing an approach. This geographical feature was named by the Sierra Club in 1938 in memory of one of their own, Peter Grubb (1919–1937), who made the first ascent of this peak in 1936. Peter died at Capri, age 18, while traveling on a bicycle tour of Italy. This mountain's toponym has been officially adopted by the United States Board on Geographic Names.

== Climate ==
According to the Köppen climate classification system, Peter Peak is located in an alpine climate zone. Most weather fronts originate in the Pacific Ocean, and travel east toward the Sierra Nevada mountains. As fronts approach, they are forced upward by the peaks, causing them to drop their moisture in the form of rain or snowfall onto the range (orographic lift). Precipitation runoff from this mountain drains into tributaries of the San Joaquin River.

== Gallery ==
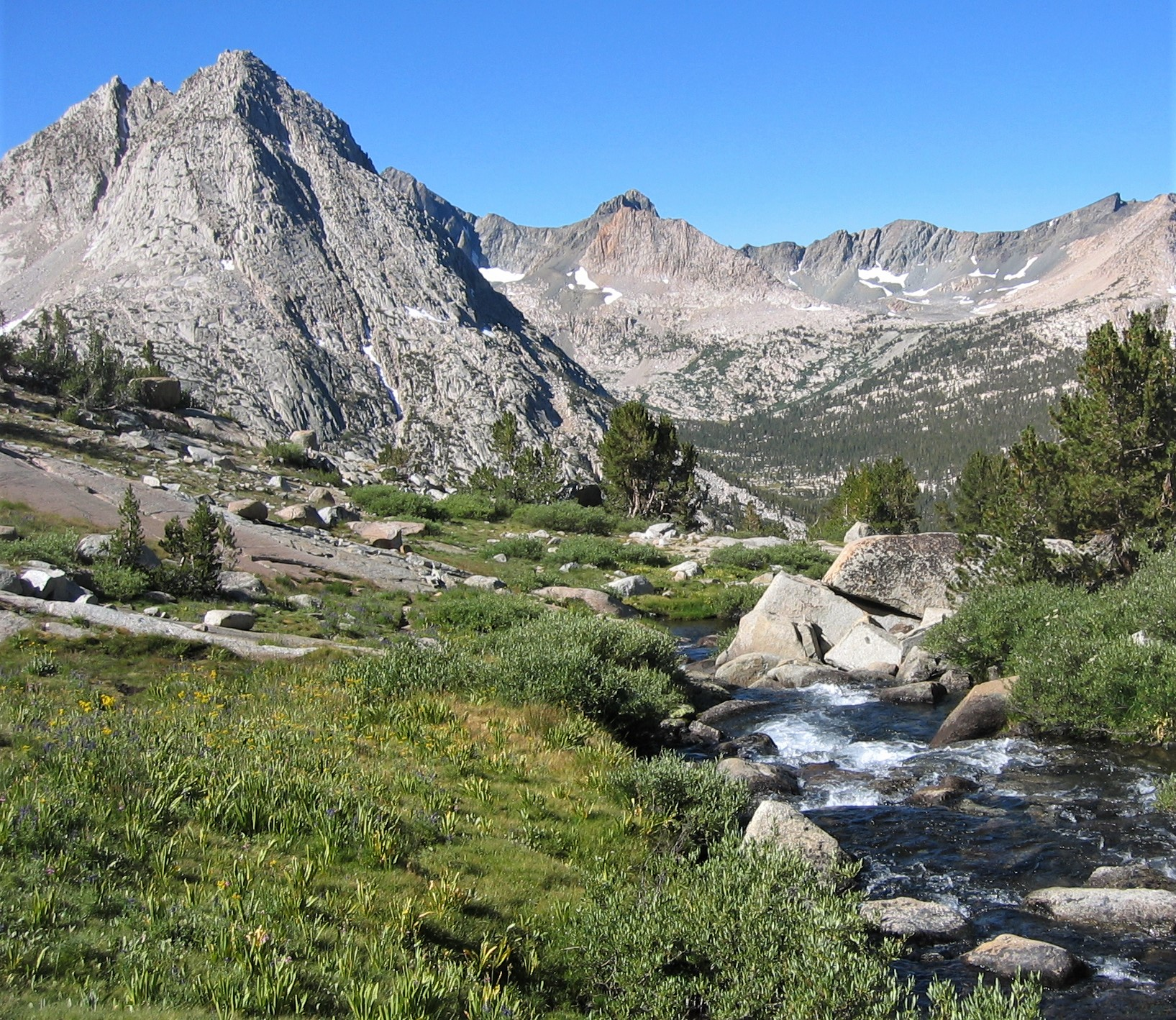
Peter Peak centered in the distance
(The Hermit to the left, from Darwin Bench)

== See also ==
- List of mountain peaks of California
- Emerald Peak
