= Emerald Peak (California) =

Mountain in California, United States

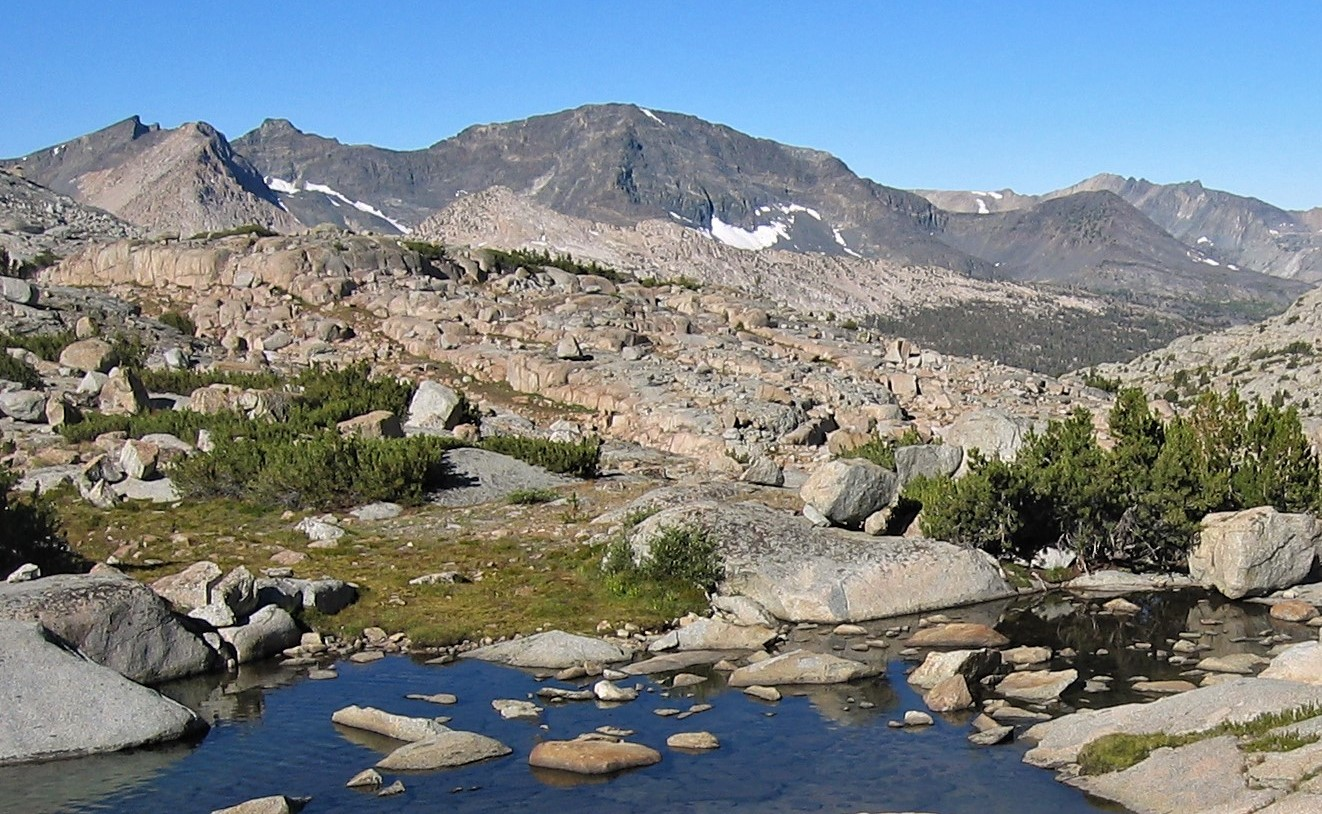
- Emerald Peak centered, from the east

Highest point
- Elevation: 12,546 ft (3,824 m)
- Prominence: 666 ft (203 m)
- Parent peak: Mount McGee (12,944 ft)
- Isolation: 2.30 mi (3.70 km)
- Listing: Sierra Peaks Section
- Coordinates: 37°09′55″N 118°45′50″W

Geography
- Location within California Location within the United States
- Country: United States
- State: California
- County: Fresno
- Protected area: Kings Canyon National Park
- Parent range: Sierra Nevada
- Topo map: USGS Mount Henry

Geology
- Rock type: metamorphic

Climbing
- First ascent: 1925
- Easiest route: class 2

Emerald Peak is a 12,546-foot-elevation (3,824-meter) mountain summit located west of the crest of the Sierra Nevada mountain range, in Fresno County of central California, United States. It is situated in northern Kings Canyon National Park, southwest of Evolution Valley, and 2.3 miles (3.7 km) northwest of Mount McGee, the nearest higher neighbor. Other nearby peaks include The Hermit, 2.5 miles (4.0 km) to the east, and Peter Peak, 1.6 miles (2.6 km) to the southeast. Topographic relief is significant as the west aspect rises over 3,500 feet (1,100 meters) above Goddard Canyon in 1.5 mile. The John Muir Trail passes to the northeast, providing an approach.

== History ==
The peak's descriptive name was originally applied in 1895 as "Emerald Point" by Sierra Club explorer Theodore Solomons due to its color, caused by greenish slate. This geographical feature's name has been officially adopted by the United States Board on Geographic Names. The first ascent of the summit was made August 8, 1925, by Sierra Club members Norman Clyde, Julie Mortimer, and Eleanor Bartlett.

== Climate ==
According to the Köppen climate classification system, Emerald Peak is located in an alpine climate zone. Most weather fronts originate in the Pacific Ocean, and travel east toward the Sierra Nevada mountains. As fronts approach, they are forced upward by the peaks, causing them to drop their moisture in the form of rain or snowfall onto the range (orographic lift). Precipitation runoff from this mountain drains into tributaries of the San Joaquin River.

== See also ==
- List of mountain peaks of California
