= Mount Henry (California) =

Mountain in the American state of California

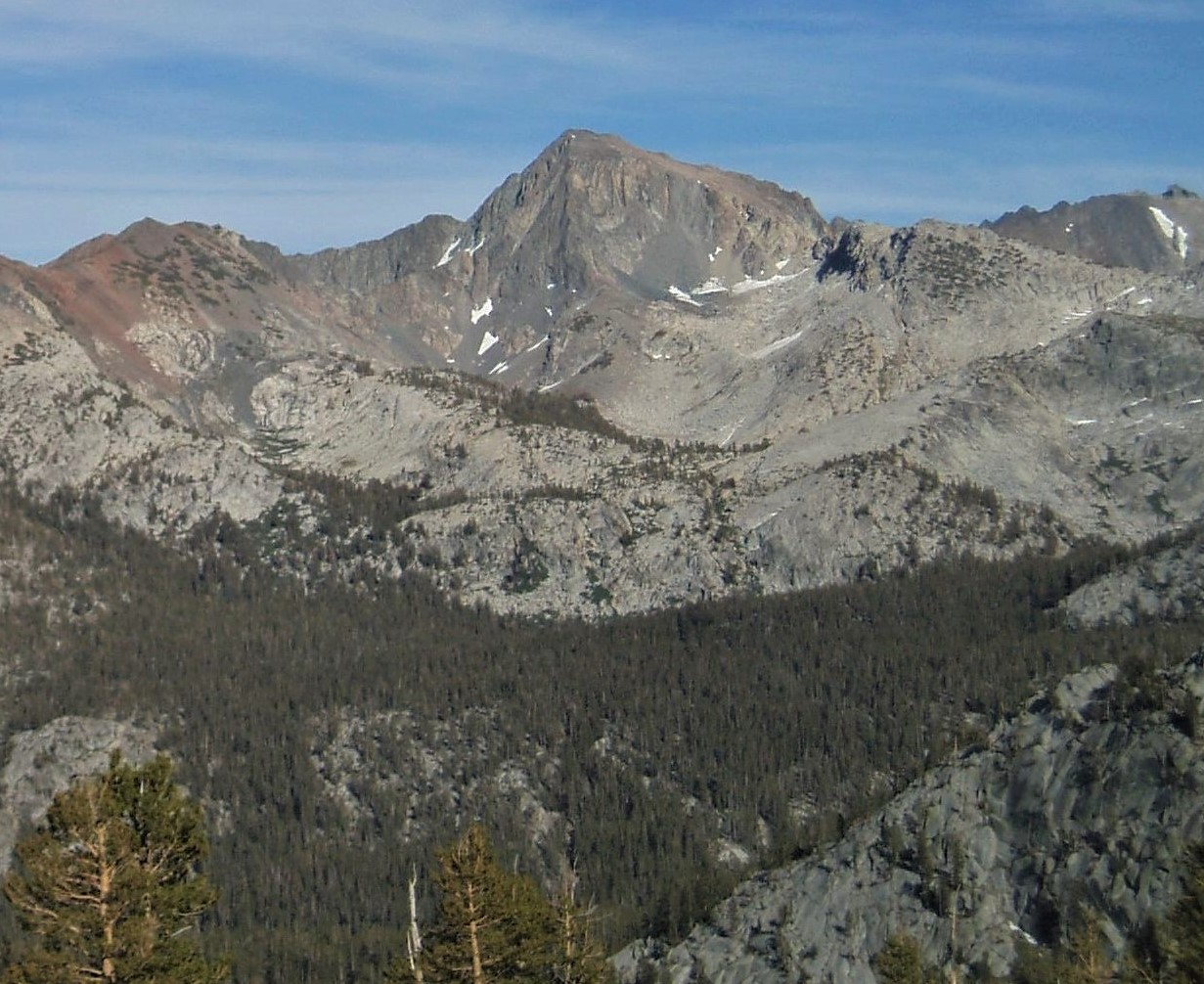
- Mount Henry, from the northwest

Highest point
- Elevation: 12,196 ft (3,717 m)
- Prominence: 876 ft (267 m)
- Parent peak: Emerald Peak (12,546 ft)
- Isolation: 3.72 mi (5.99 km)
- Listing: Sierra Peaks Section
- Coordinates: 37°10′59″N 118°49′38″W

Naming
- Etymology: Joseph Henry

Geography
- Location within California Location within the United States
- Country: United States
- State: California
- County: Fresno
- Protected area: Kings Canyon National Park
- Parent range: Sierra Nevada
- Topo map: USGS Mount Henry

Climbing
- Easiest route: class 2

Mount Henry is a 12,196-foot-elevation (3,717-meter) mountain summit located in the Sierra Nevada mountain range, in Fresno County of northern California, United States. It is situated on the Le Conte Divide, along the shared boundary of John Muir Wilderness and Kings Canyon National Park, and 3.7 miles (6.0 km) northwest of Emerald Peak, the nearest higher neighbor. Topographic relief is significant as the east aspect rises 3,800 feet (1,200 meters) above South Fork San Joaquin River in two miles. The John Muir Trail passes to the northeast, providing an approach option.

== Etymology ==
The peak's name was applied in 1904 by Joseph Nisbet LeConte to honor Joseph Henry (1797–1878), an eminent American scientist noted for his investigations of electromagnetism, and who served as the first Secretary of the Smithsonian Institution. This geographical feature's name has been officially adopted by the United States Board on Geographic Names.

== Climate ==
According to the Köppen climate classification system, Mount Henry is located in an alpine climate zone. Most weather fronts originate in the Pacific Ocean, and travel east toward the Sierra Nevada mountains. As fronts approach, they are forced upward by the peaks, causing them to drop their moisture in the form of rain or snowfall onto the range (orographic lift). Precipitation runoff from this mountain drains into the San Joaquin River watershed.

Climate data for Mount Henry 37.1837 N, 118.8264 W, Elevation: 11,535 ft (3,516 m) (1991–2020 normals)
| Month | Jan | Feb | Mar | Apr | May | Jun | Jul | Aug | Sep | Oct | Nov | Dec | Year |
|---|---|---|---|---|---|---|---|---|---|---|---|---|---|
| Mean daily maximum °F (°C) | 31.0 (−0.6) | 30.1 (−1.1) | 33.4 (0.8) | 37.8 (3.2) | 44.8 (7.1) | 53.9 (12.2) | 60.5 (15.8) | 59.8 (15.4) | 54.6 (12.6) | 46.5 (8.1) | 37.5 (3.1) | 30.7 (−0.7) | 43.4 (6.3) |
| Daily mean °F (°C) | 21.4 (−5.9) | 19.6 (−6.9) | 22.3 (−5.4) | 25.9 (−3.4) | 33.3 (0.7) | 42.4 (5.8) | 49.6 (9.8) | 48.8 (9.3) | 43.2 (6.2) | 35.6 (2.0) | 27.4 (−2.6) | 21.2 (−6.0) | 32.6 (0.3) |
| Mean daily minimum °F (°C) | 11.7 (−11.3) | 9.2 (−12.7) | 11.2 (−11.6) | 14.1 (−9.9) | 21.7 (−5.7) | 30.9 (−0.6) | 38.6 (3.7) | 37.8 (3.2) | 31.9 (−0.1) | 24.7 (−4.1) | 17.4 (−8.1) | 11.6 (−11.3) | 21.7 (−5.7) |
| Average precipitation inches (mm) | 9.26 (235) | 7.71 (196) | 6.90 (175) | 4.26 (108) | 2.22 (56) | 0.60 (15) | 0.29 (7.4) | 0.15 (3.8) | 0.35 (8.9) | 2.08 (53) | 2.91 (74) | 8.52 (216) | 45.25 (1,148.1) |
Source: PRISM Climate Group

== Climbing ==
It is unknown when, or by whom, the first ascent was made.

Established climbing routes:

- Northeast ridge – class 2 – July 7, 1939, by a Sierra Club party led by David Brower
- Southwest slope – class 2 – August 14, 1939, by a party of eight
- West slope – class 2 – August 29, 1940, by Bob Helliwell and Alden Bryant
- North ridge – class 3 – July 10, 1951 by Art Reyman

== See also ==
- List of mountain peaks of California

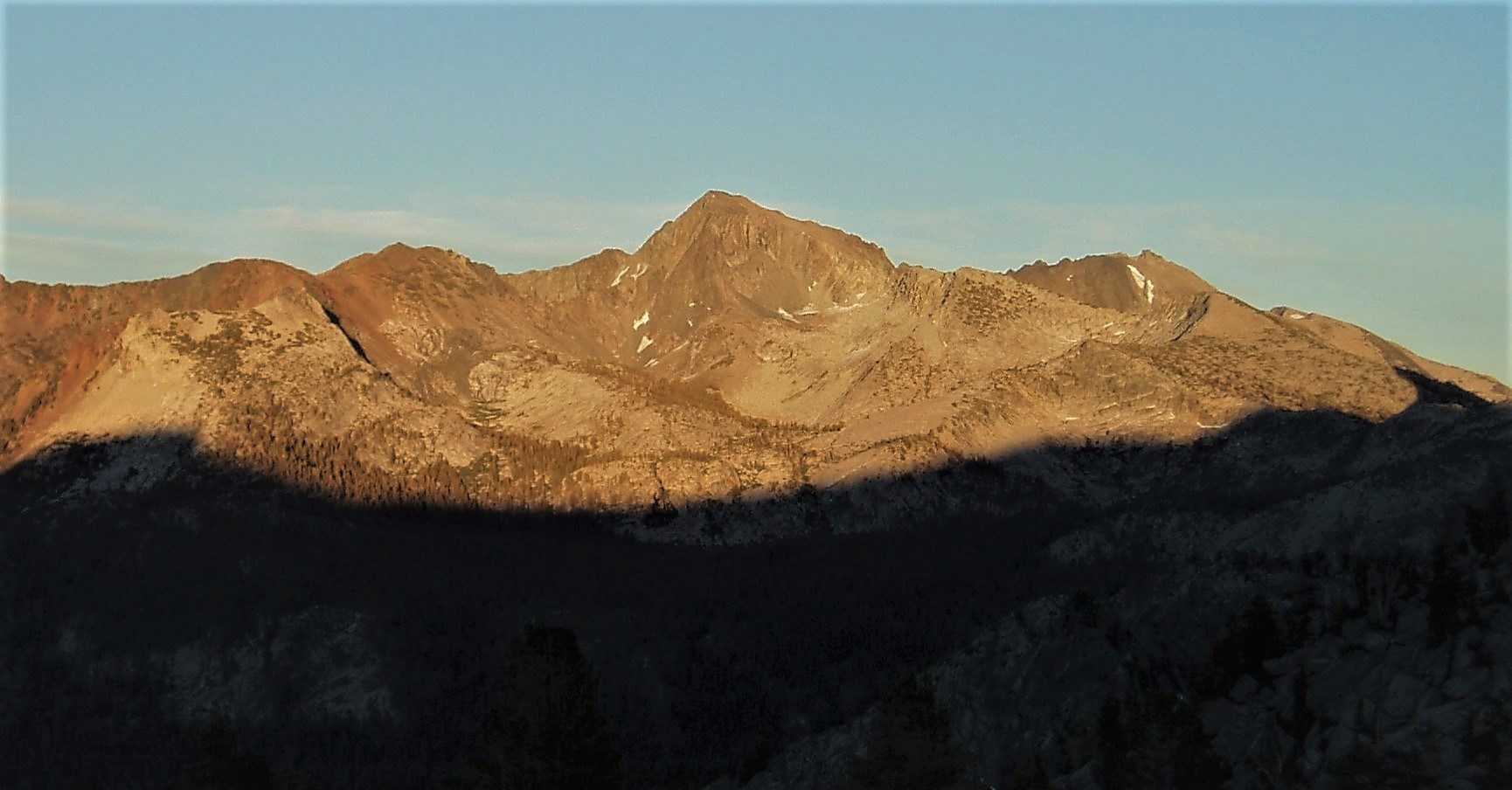
Sunset on Mt. Henry
