= Mount Reinstein =

Mountain in California, United States of America

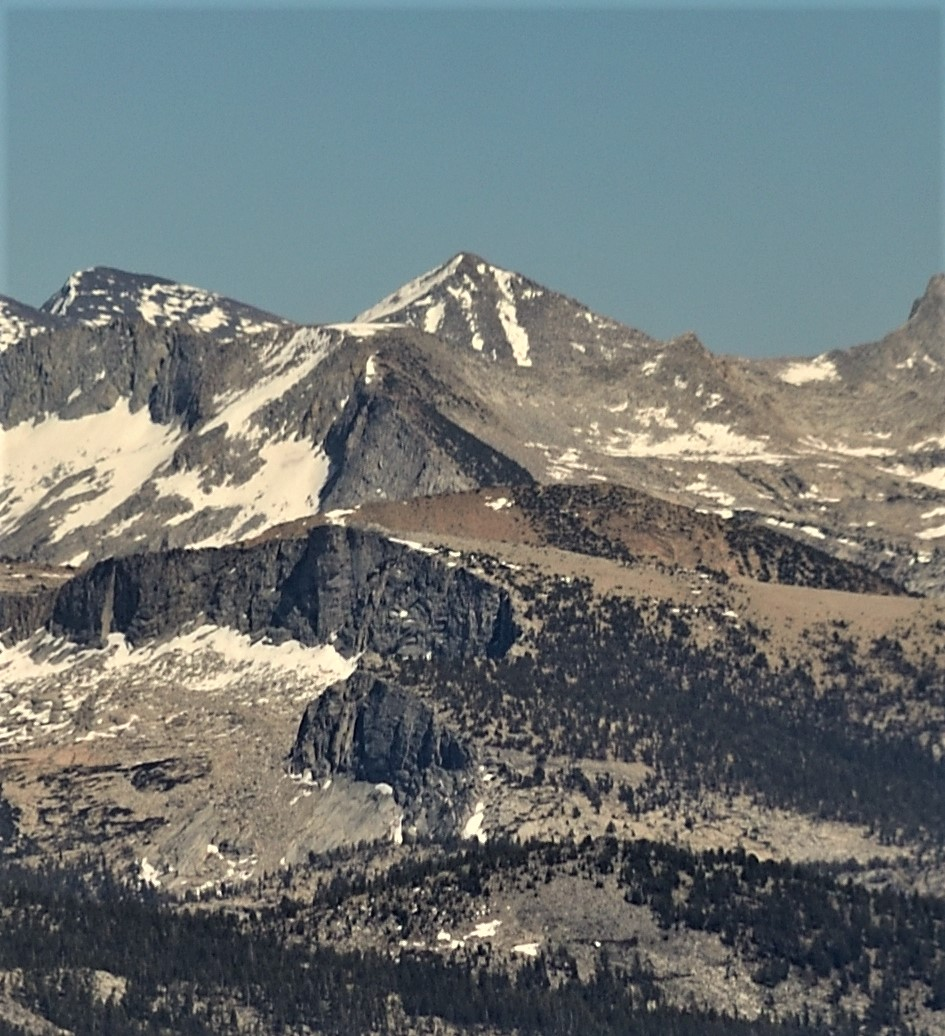
- Northwest aspect centered at top

Highest point
- Elevation: 12,586 ft (3,836 m)
- Prominence: 706 ft (215 m)
- Isolation: 1.25 mi (2.01 km)
- Listing: Sierra Peaks Section
- Coordinates: 37°04′46″N 118°44′18″W

Naming
- Etymology: Jacob B. Reinstein (1853–1911)

Geography
- Location within California Location within the United States
- Location: Kings Canyon National Park; Fresno County, California, U.S.
- Parent range: Sierra Nevada
- Topo map: USGS Mount Goddard

Geology
- Rock age: Cretaceous
- Mountain type: Fault block
- Rock type: Granodiorite

Climbing
- First ascent: Unknown
- Easiest route: class 2

Mount Reinstein is a 12,586-foot-elevation (3,836-meter) mountain summit located west of the crest of the Sierra Nevada mountain range, in Fresno County, California, United States. This peak is situated on the common boundary shared by Kings Canyon National Park with John Muir Wilderness, and it is the highest point on LeConte Divide. Reinstein ranks as the 260th-highest summit in California. It is set 2.7 miles (4.3 km) west of Scylla and 2.0 miles (3.2 km) southwest of Mount Goddard. Topographic relief is significant as the summit rises nearly 1,600 feet (490 meters) above Martha Lake in less than one mile. An ascent of the peak is non-technical, and inclusion on the Sierra Peaks Section peakbagging list generates climbing interest in this remote peak.

== History ==
This mountain was named "Reinstein Peak" in 1911 to honor Jacob Bert Reinstein, a charter member of the Sierra Club, prominent San Francisco attorney, and a regent of the University of California from 1897 until his death on April 16, 1911, at age 57. The toponym's present form was officially adopted in 1983 by the United States Board on Geographic Names.

== Climate ==
Mount Reinstein is located in an alpine climate zone. Most weather fronts originate in the Pacific Ocean, and travel east toward the Sierra Nevada mountains. As fronts approach, they are forced upward by the peaks (orographic lift), causing them to drop their moisture in the form of rain or snowfall onto the range. Precipitation runoff from this mountain drains east into Goddard Creek which is a tributary of the Middle Fork Kings River, and west to the North Fork Kings River.

== See also ==
- Sequoia-Kings Canyon Wilderness
