= Mount McGee (California) =

Mountain in California, United States

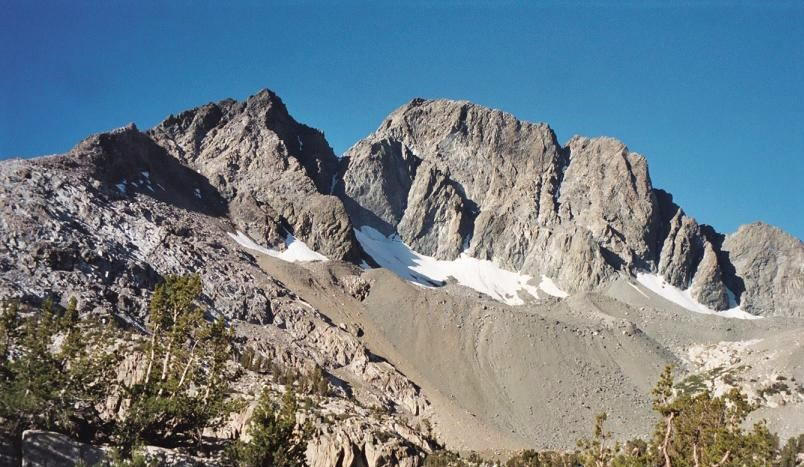
- Mt. McGee, north aspect

Highest point
- Elevation: 12,944 ft (3,945 m)
- Prominence: 1,264 ft (385 m)
- Parent peak: Mount Goddard (13,564 ft)
- Isolation: 1.82 mi (2.93 km)
- Listing: Sierra Peaks Section
- Coordinates: 37°08′20″N 118°44′17″W

Naming
- Etymology: William John McGee

Geography
- Location within California Location within the United States
- Location: Kings Canyon National Park; Fresno County; California, U.S.
- Parent range: Sierra Nevada
- Topo map: USGS Mount Darwin

Geology
- Rock type: metamorphic

Climbing
- First ascent: July 1923
- Easiest route: class 2+

Mount McGee is a 12,944-foot-elevation (3,945-meter) mountain summit located west of the crest of the Sierra Nevada mountain range, in Fresno County of central California, United States. It is situated in northern Kings Canyon National Park, 0.6 miles (0.97 km) southeast of Peter Peak, 2 miles (3.2 km) southwest of The Hermit, and 2.6 miles (4.2 km) north-northwest of Mount Goddard, the nearest higher neighbor. Topographic relief is significant as the west aspect rises 3,100 feet (940 meters) above Goddard Canyon in two miles. This geographical feature was named for William John McGee (1853–1912), well-known American geologist and anthropologist. This mountain's name has been officially adopted by the United States Board on Geographic Names. The first ascent of the summit was made in July 1923 by Roger N. Burnham, Robert E. Brownlee, Ralph H. Brandt, and Leonard Keeler.

== Climate ==
According to the Köppen climate classification system, Mount McGee is located in an alpine climate zone. Most weather fronts originate in the Pacific Ocean, and travel east toward the Sierra Nevada mountains. As fronts approach, they are forced upward by the peaks, causing them to drop their moisture in the form of rain or snowfall onto the range (orographic lift). Precipitation runoff from this mountain drains into tributaries of the San Joaquin River.

== Climbing ==
Established climbing routes:

- South chute – class 2 – Probably route of 1923 first ascent
- West face – class 2 – FA 1933 by Glen Dawson, Neil Ruge, Bala Ballantine
- North chute – class 4 – FA 1930 by Glen Dawson, Charles Dodge, Jules M. Eichorn, John Olmstead

== See also ==
- List of mountain peaks of California

== Gallery ==
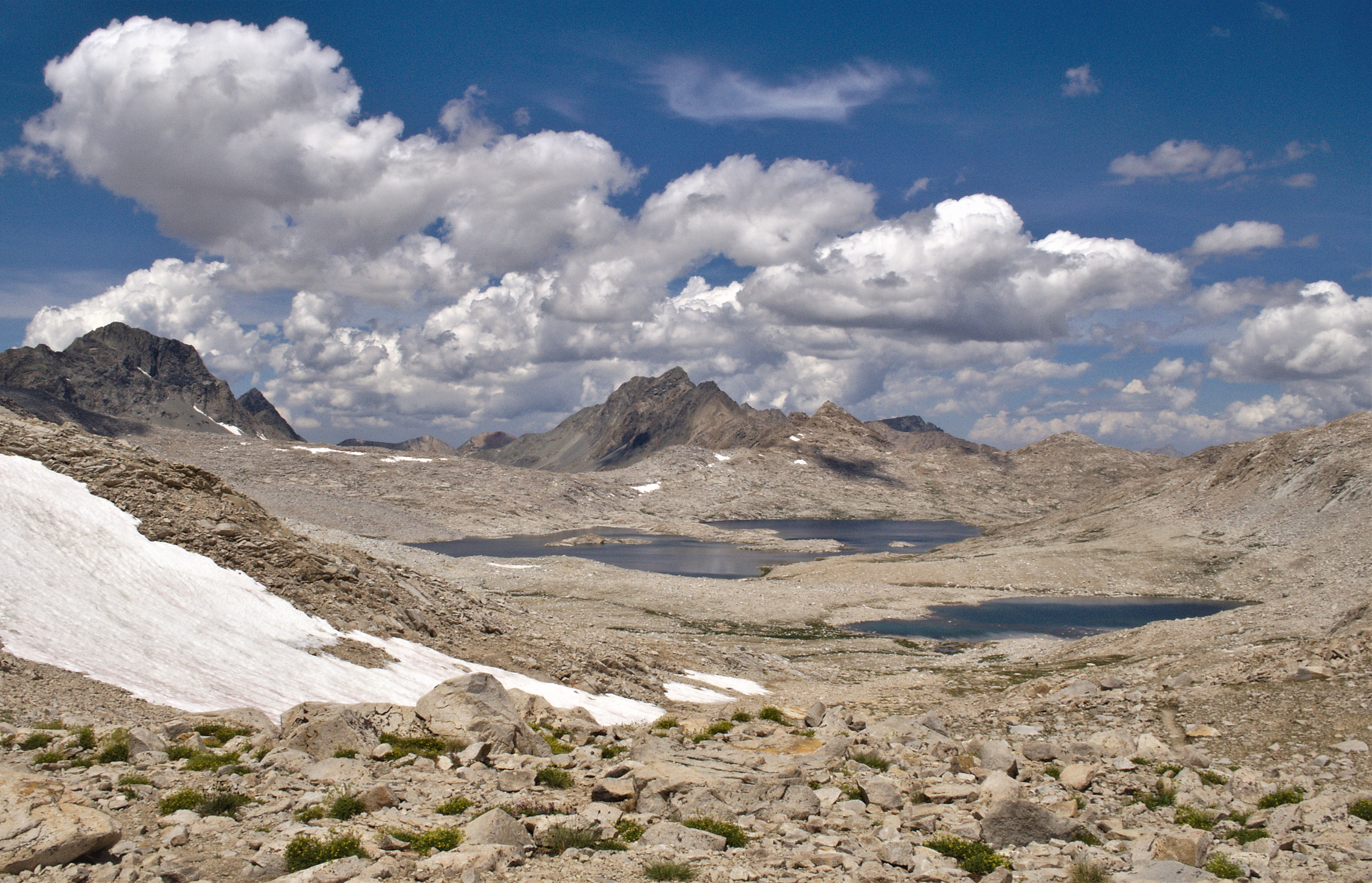
Mt. McGee centered, from Muir Pass

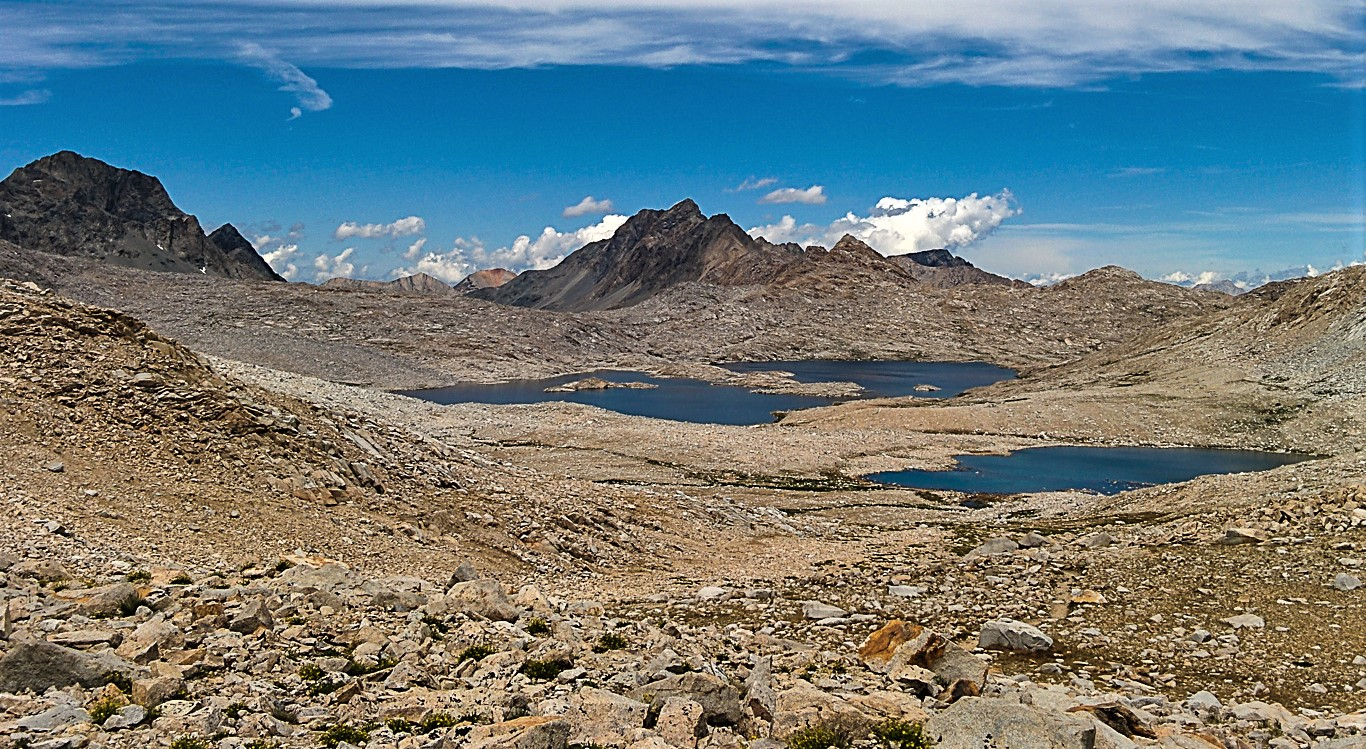
Mt. McGee centered beyond Wanda Lake. Looking northwest from Muir Pass.
