= The Hermit (California mountain) =

Mountain in the state of California

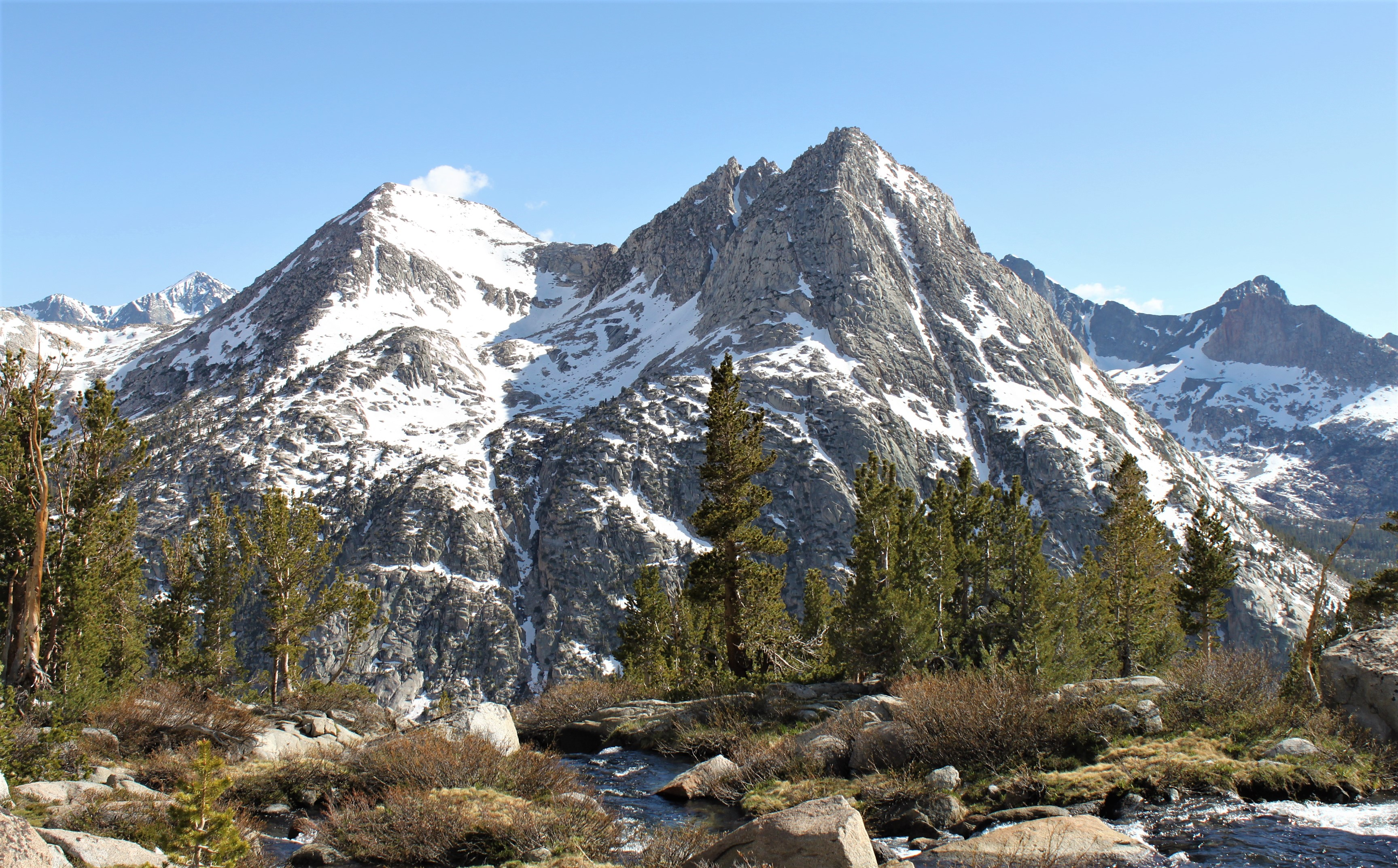
- North aspect, from Darwin Bench

Highest point
- Elevation: 12,328 ft (3,758 m)
- Prominence: 368 ft (112 m)
- Parent peak: Peak 12342
- Isolation: 0.52 mi (0.84 km)
- Listing: Sierra Peaks Section
- Coordinates: 37°09′46″N 118°43′07″W

Geography
- Location within California Location within the United States
- Country: United States
- State: California
- County: Fresno
- Protected area: Kings Canyon National Park
- Parent range: Sierra Nevada
- Topo map: USGS Mount Darwin

Geology
- Rock type: granite

Climbing
- First ascent: 1924
- Easiest route: class 5.5

The Hermit is a 12,328-foot-elevation (3,758-meter) mountain summit located west of the crest of the Sierra Nevada mountain range, in Fresno County of central California, United States. It is situated in northern Kings Canyon National Park, 2.5 miles (4.0 km) east of Emerald Peak, and 2.5 miles (4.0 km) west of Mount Darwin. Topographic relief is significant as the north aspect rises 2,500 feet (760 meters) above Evolution Valley in less than one mile. The John Muir Trail passes to the east and north of this landmark, providing an approach. This geographical feature was named by Sierra Club explorer Theodore Solomons in 1895 as he wrote: "The traveler will be greatly attracted by a very sharp peak or butte that rises on the south wall. From its isolated position as viewed from the valley we called it the Hermit."

== Climate ==
According to the Köppen climate classification system, The Hermit is located in an alpine climate zone. Most weather fronts originate in the Pacific Ocean, and travel east toward the Sierra Nevada mountains. As fronts approach, they are forced upward by the peaks, causing them to drop their moisture in the form of rain or snowfall onto the range (orographic lift). Precipitation runoff from this mountain drains to Evolution Creek which is a San Joaquin River tributary.

== Climbing ==
The first ascent of the mountain is credited to Leonard Keeler, Ralph Brandt, Marion Avery, and Margaret Avery on July 2, 1924. George R. Bunn climbed it July 28, 1924, declaring the final 20-foot summit slab as unclimbable, and Sierra Club mountaineers James Rennie and Norman Clyde climbed it on August 2, 1925. Due to exposure, rope is recommended for the final class 5.5 summit block, although one source claims that the south side of the summit block can be climbed by employing a "shaky shoulder stand."

Established routes on The Hermit:

- East side from Evolution Lake – class 2
- Southwest slope via McGee Canyon – class 2
- North Ridge – class 3 – FA 1936, by Richard G. Johnson, Peter Grubb
- Northwest Face – class 3 – FA 1939, by Harriet Parsons, Madi Bacon, Maxine Cushing

== Gallery ==
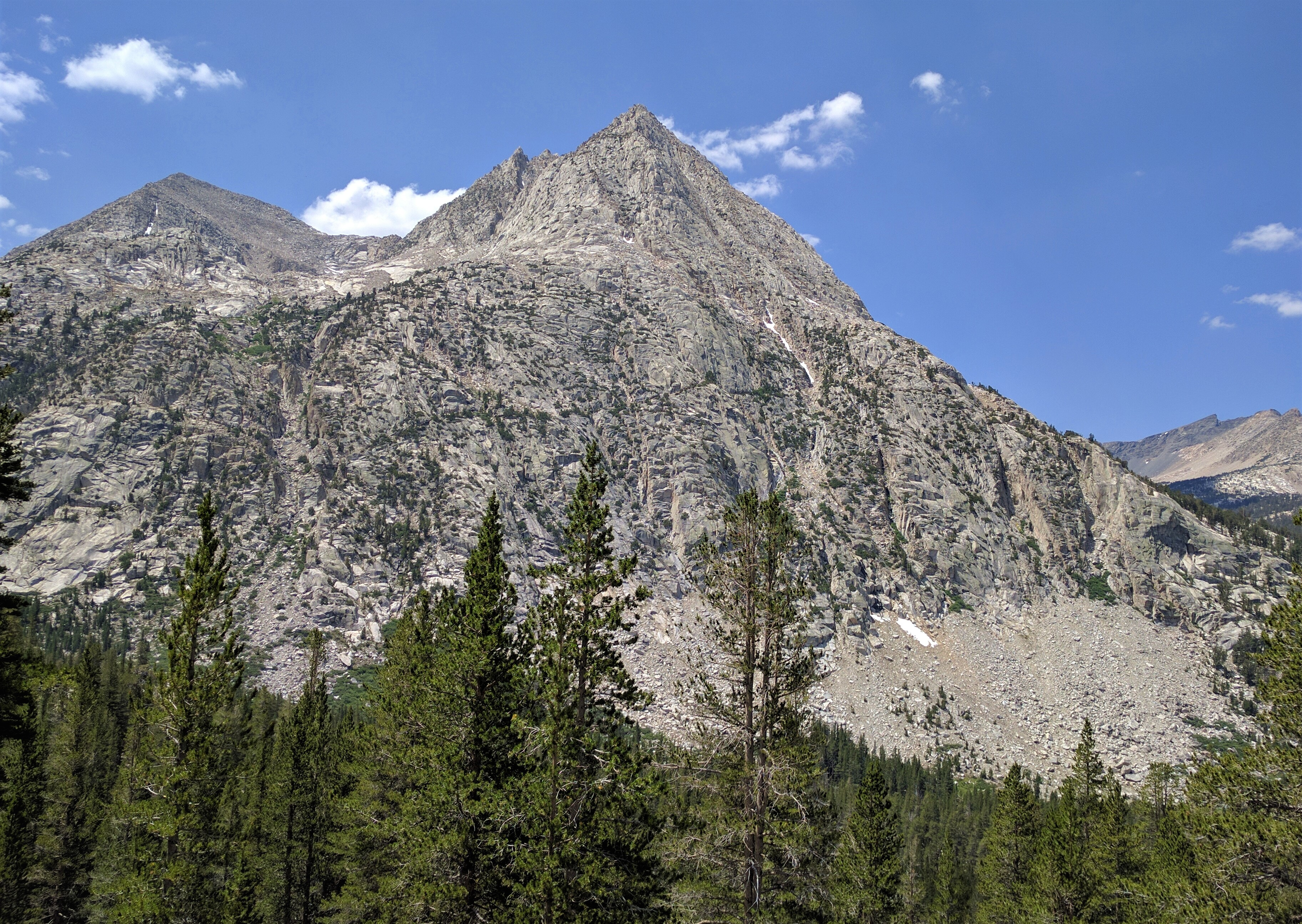
North aspect, from Evolution Valley

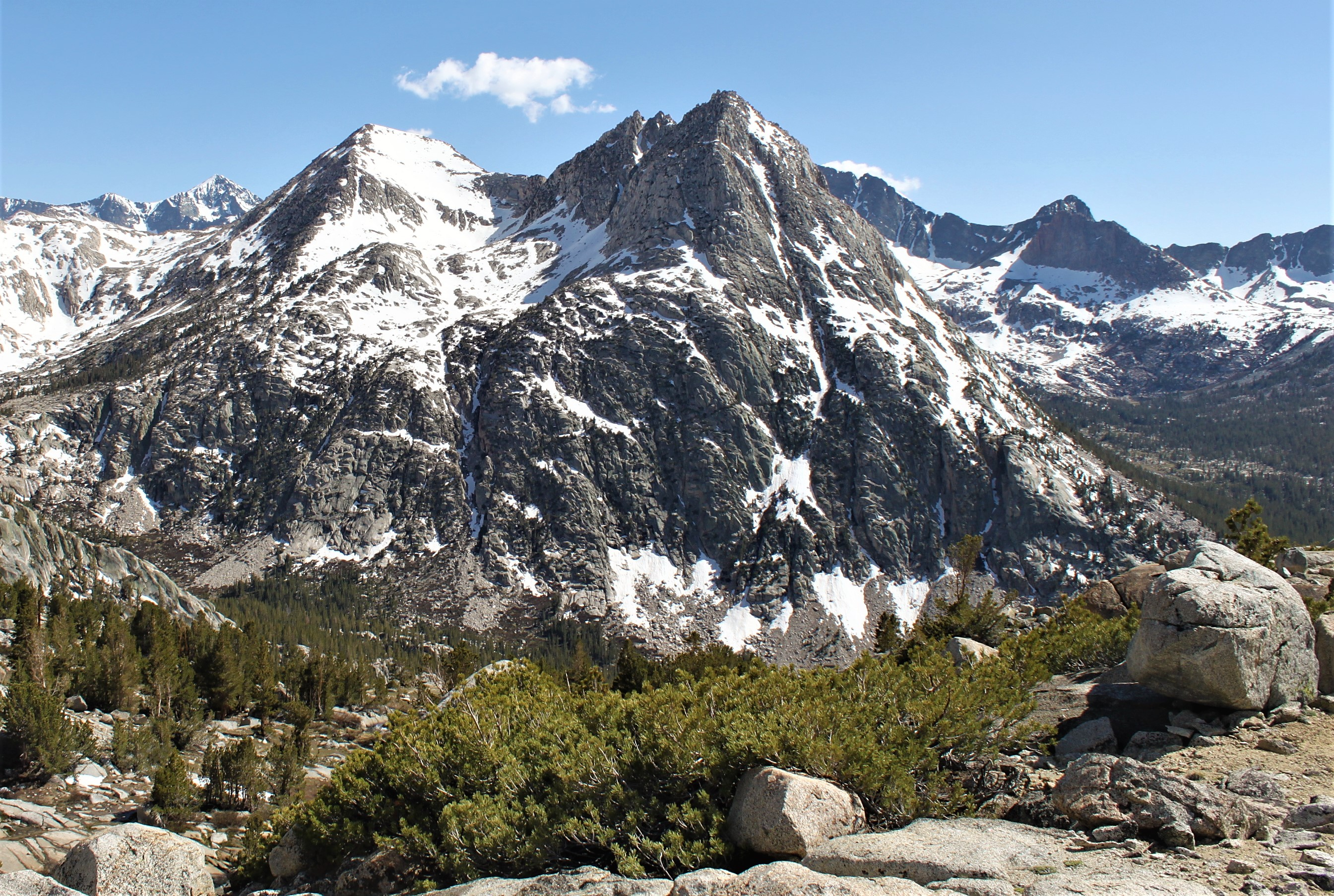
North aspect, from Darwin Bench

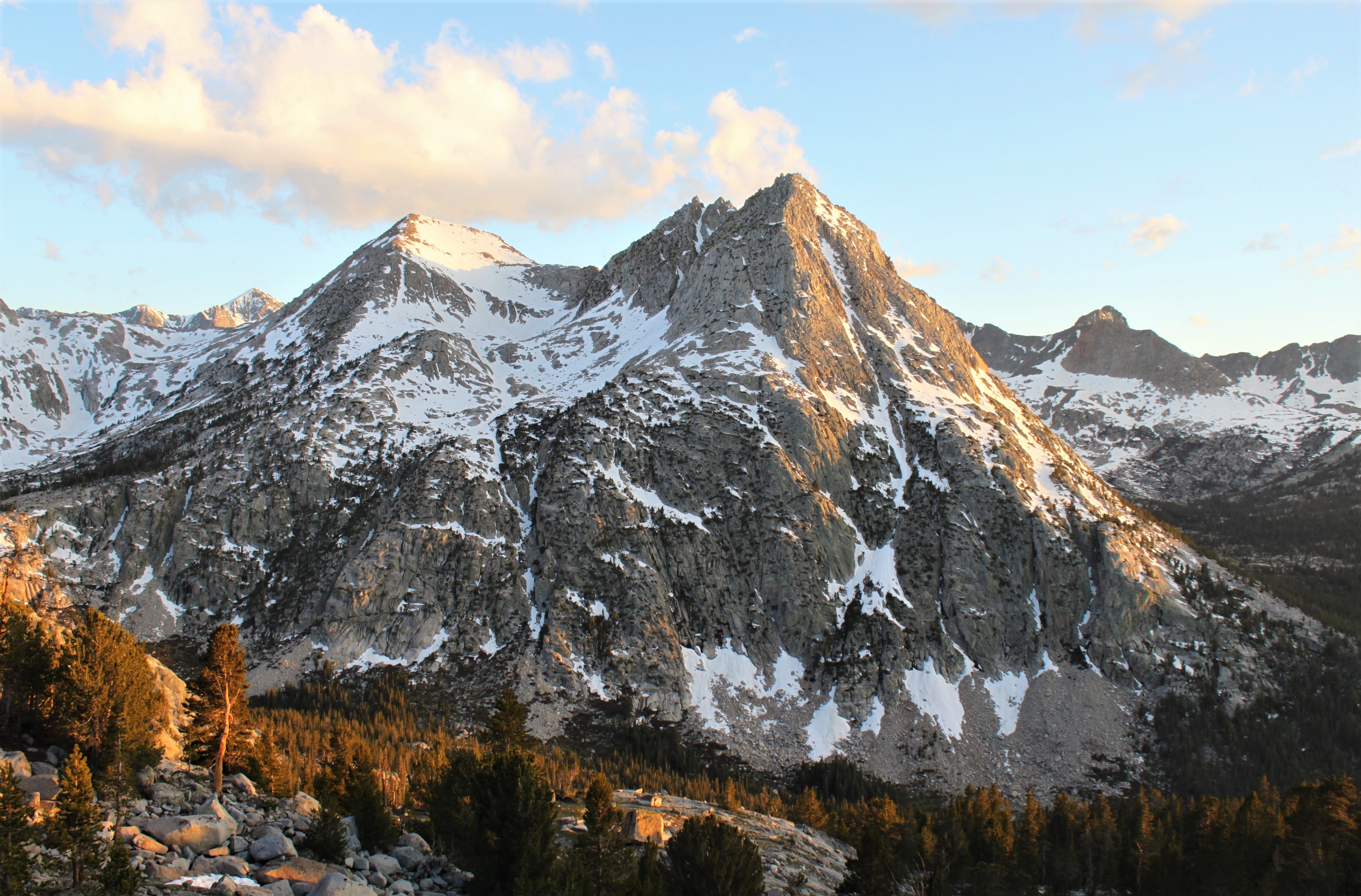
North aspect, from Darwin Bench

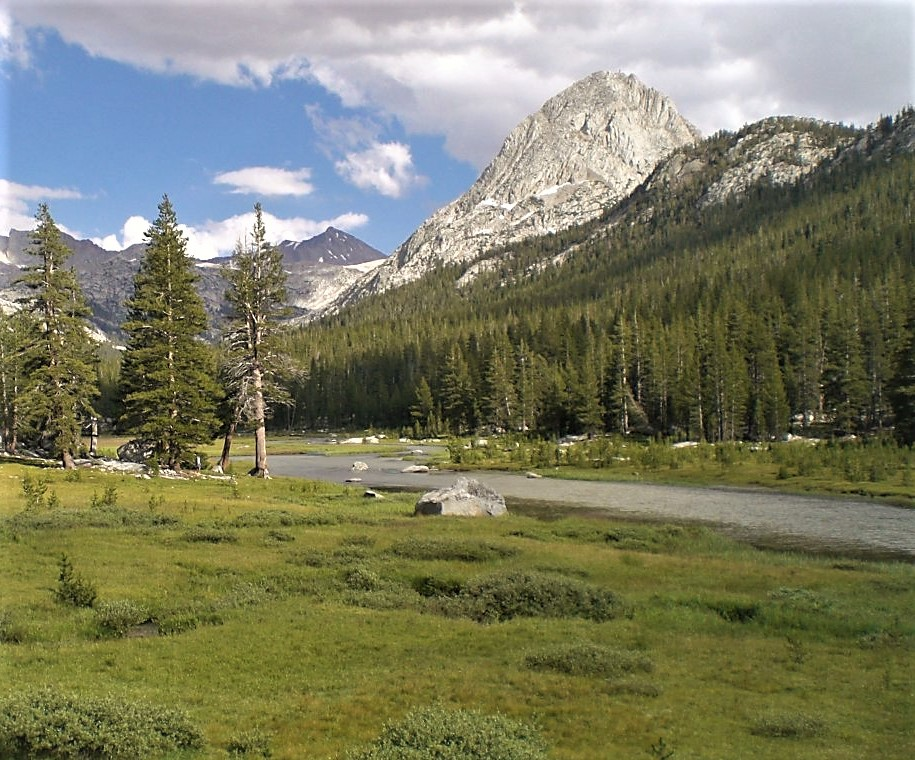
The Hermit from northwest in Evolution Valley

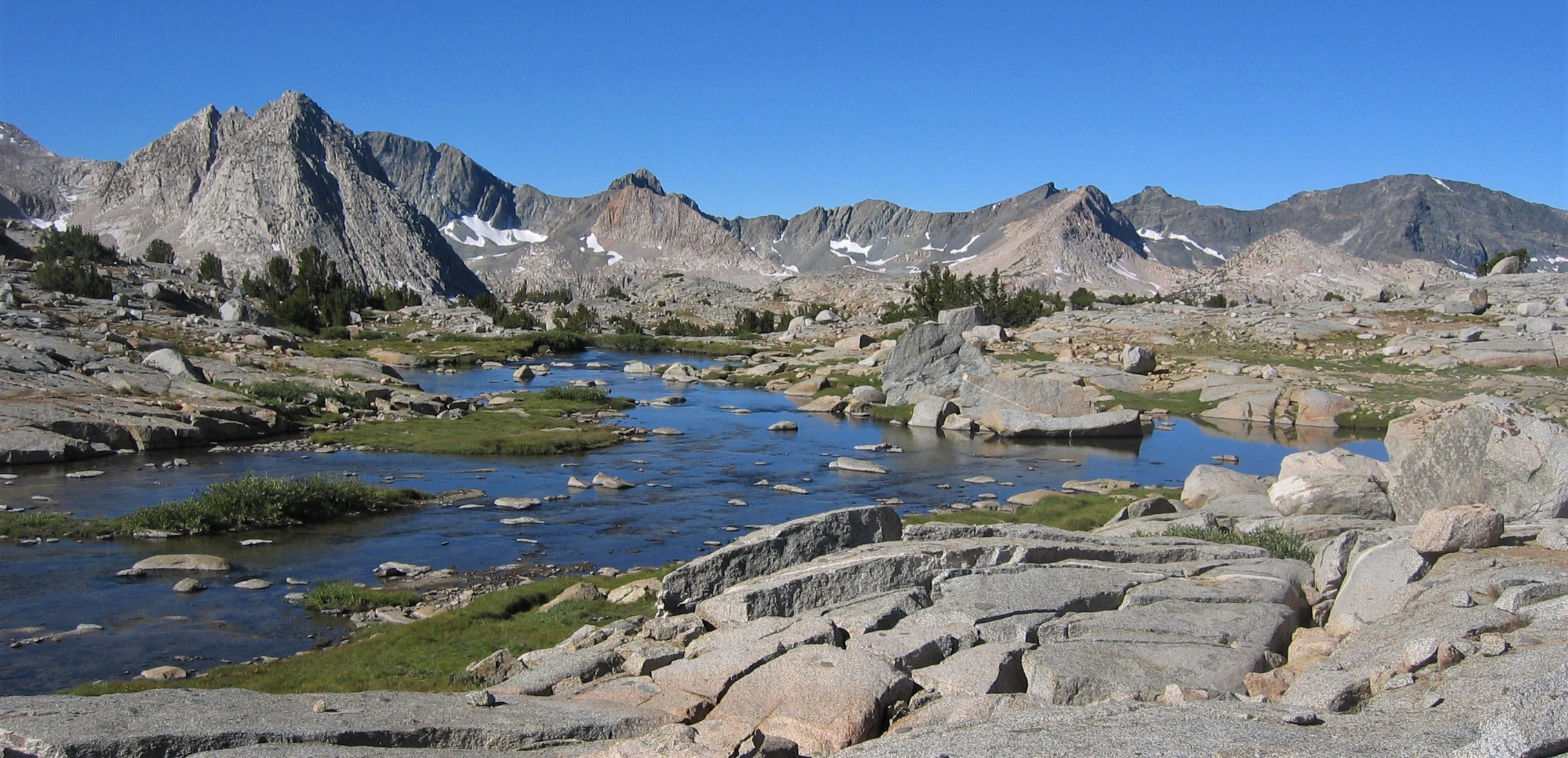
The Hermit, far left (Emerald Peak to far right)

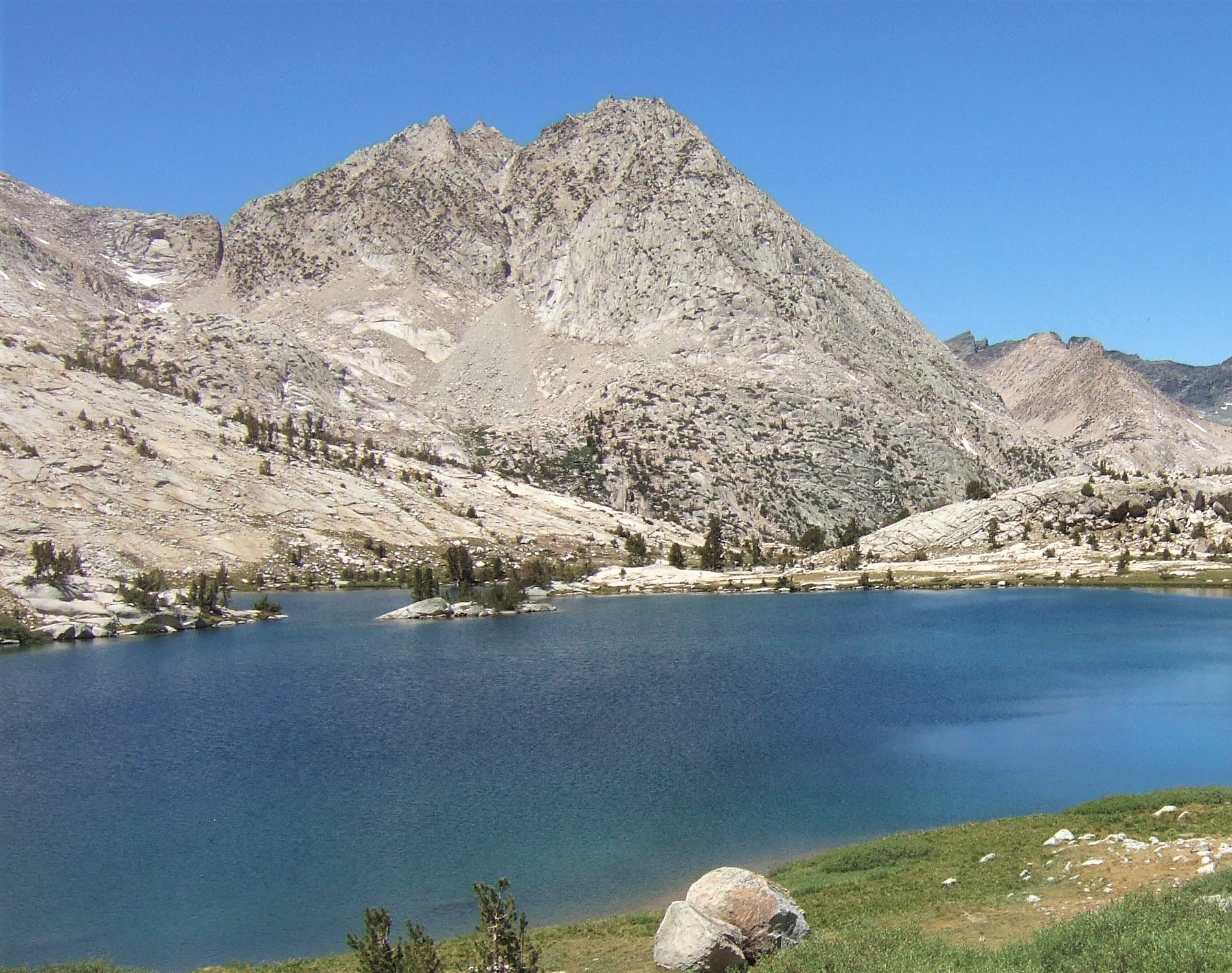
The Hermit from Evolution Lake

== See also ==
- List of mountain peaks of California
- Mount McGee
