= Theodore Solomons =

American explorer

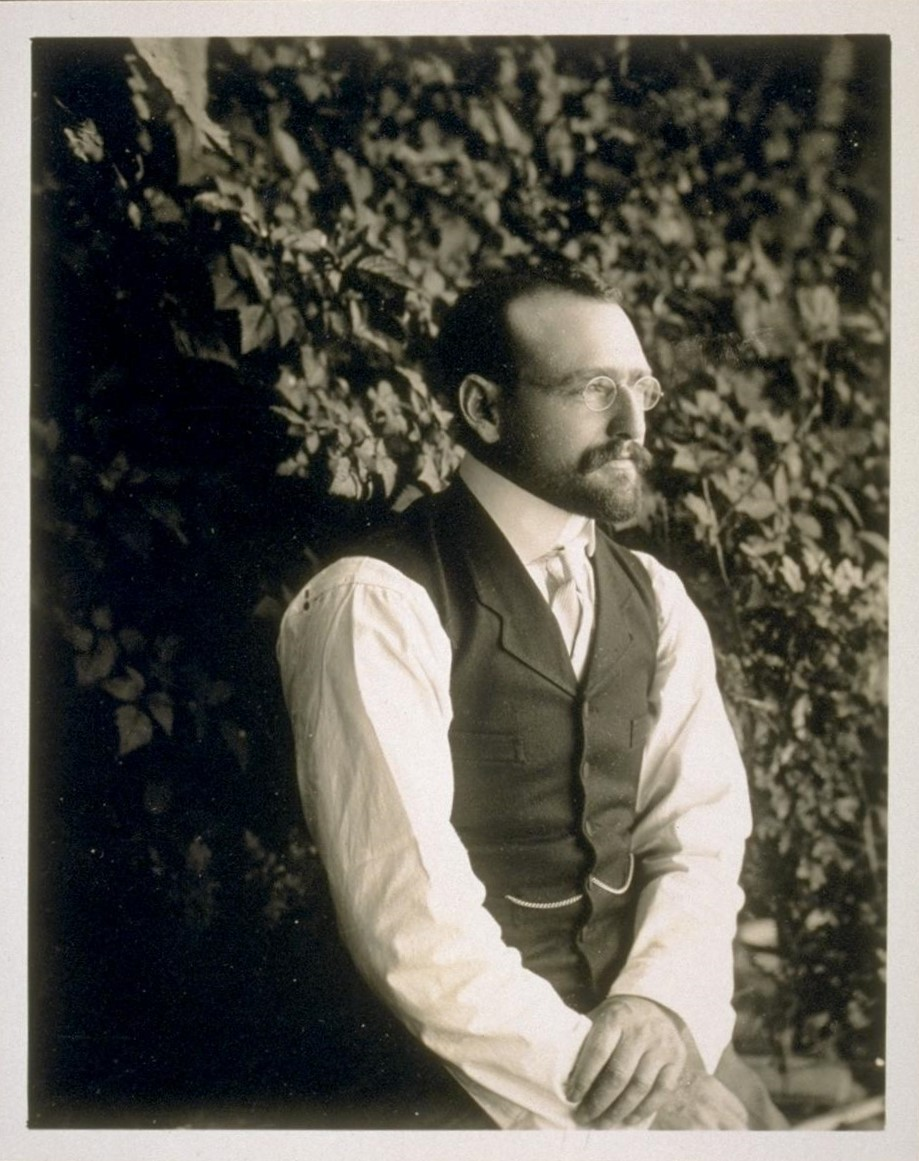
- Born: July 20, 1870; San Francisco, California, U.S.
- Died: May 27, 1947 (aged 76); Los Angeles, California
- Occupations: Explorer, naturalist & writer
- Spouses: Rozella M. Gould; Katherine Gray Church; Yvonne Robinson
- Children: Eleanor Susan B. Anthony "Toni" Solomons; David Seixas Solomons; Leon Henry Solomons
- Parent(s): Gershom Mendes Seixas Solomons; Hannah Marks

Theodore Seixas Solomons (1870–1947) was an American explorer and early member of the Sierra Club. From 1892 to 1897 he explored and named the Mount Goddard, Evolution Valley and Evolution Basin region in what is now northern Kings Canyon National Park in eastern California. He was instrumental in envisioning, exploring, and establishing the route of what became the John Muir Trail from Yosemite Valley along the crest of the Sierra Nevada to Mount Whitney.

== Biography ==
=== Early life and ancestors ===
Solomons was born in San Francisco, California, on July 20, 1870, the second son and the fifth of seven children (Note: Selina (b. 1862) became a writer and advocate for woman suffrage; Lucius Levy (b. 1863) became a lawyer and public speaker; Gertrude Marks (b. 1866) died at a young age; Adele Rosa (b. 1868) became a doctor; Leon Mendes (b. 1873) became a scholar; Frank Benjamin (b. 1875) died as an infant.) of Hannah Marks, an influential San Francisco educator and civic worker and Gershom Mendes Seixas Solomons. (Note: His cousin was the poet Emma Lazarus (1849–1887), known for her verses inscribed on the Statue of Liberty. He was also related to Benjamin N. Cardozo, Associate Justice of the US Supreme Court.) Gershom Solomons had relocated to San Francisco from New York City during the Gold Rush, and founded Congregation Emanu-El in 1854. He was also the first president of any West Coast lodge of B'nai B'rith. His great-grandfather was Gershom Mendes Seixas, of Portuguese-Jewish descent (1745–1816), the "Patriot Rabbi", the first native-born Rabbi in the United States. (Note: He was one of the fourteen recognized ministers in New York in 1789, participating in George Washington's first inauguration. He was also one of the incorporators of Columbia University and served as a member of the Board of Regents of the University of the State of New York.)

Solomons later recalled that the idea that resulted in the John Muir Trail originated in his adolescence. "The idea of a crest-parallel trail came to me one day while herding my uncle's cattle in an immense unfenced alfalfa field near Fresno. It was 1884 and I was 14."

=== Marriage and family ===
Solomons married three times. He married as his first wife, on March 29, 1901, at Dawson Creek, British Columbia, Canada, Rozella M. Gould of Dawson Creek. They were later divorced. There were no children from this marriage. He married on January 8, 1909, in New York City, as his second wife, Katherine Gray Church, born on May 6, 1881, in New York City the only daughter of Henry Seymour Church and Margaretta Josephine Gray. She died on February 7, 1971, in Cherryland, Alameda County, California. (Note: Katherine's stepfather was Albert J. Bothwell, a wealthy cattle baron and founder of the Wyoming Stock Growers Association and considered, by some, to be the main instigator of the infamous Wyoming Johnson County War.) Her mother, a published writer and singer, was born into a family with deep New England roots that trace back to the Rev. Mr. Blackleach Burritt, and Governor Thomas Welles. After his second wife was committed to a mental institution, he married Yvonne Robinson who died in 1965. They had no children.

Theodore and Katherine were the parents of three children: Eleanor Susan Brownell Anthony "Toni" Solomons (1911–2006), (Note: An unusually gifted student, Toni scored so high on intelligence tests that she was selected for a lifelong research project known as the Terman Genetic Studies of Genius. The study was started by Lewis Terman at Stanford University. After marrying and divorcing Benjamin O. Jackson, she began a relationship with Ed Ricketts in 1940 and became his common-law wife. Toni, who had attended the University of California, Los Angeles, later worked as a personal assistant for Pulitzer Prize–winning writer John Steinbeck and was the editor of The Log from the Sea of Cortez. Beside Steinbeck, their circle of friends also included the writer and painter, Henry Miller and the mythologist, writer, and lecturer Joseph Campbell. Toni left Ricketts after the death of her daughter from her first marriage, Katherine Adele Jackson. Katherine died on October 5, 1947, at the age of 12, from a brain tumor—just five months after the death of her father, Benjamin O. Jackson. Toni later married Benjamin Elazari Volcani.) David Seixas Solomons (1913–1961), and Leon Henry Solomons (1915–1988). Eleanor was married to Israeli biologist Benjamin Elazari Volcani.

They lived at a house he named the Flying Spur, which he built on 20 acres (81,000 m^{2}) of land that juts out over the Merced River Canyon. It is located at 4,600 feet (1,400 m) in the Stanislaus National Forest adjacent to Yosemite National Park.

== Explorations ==
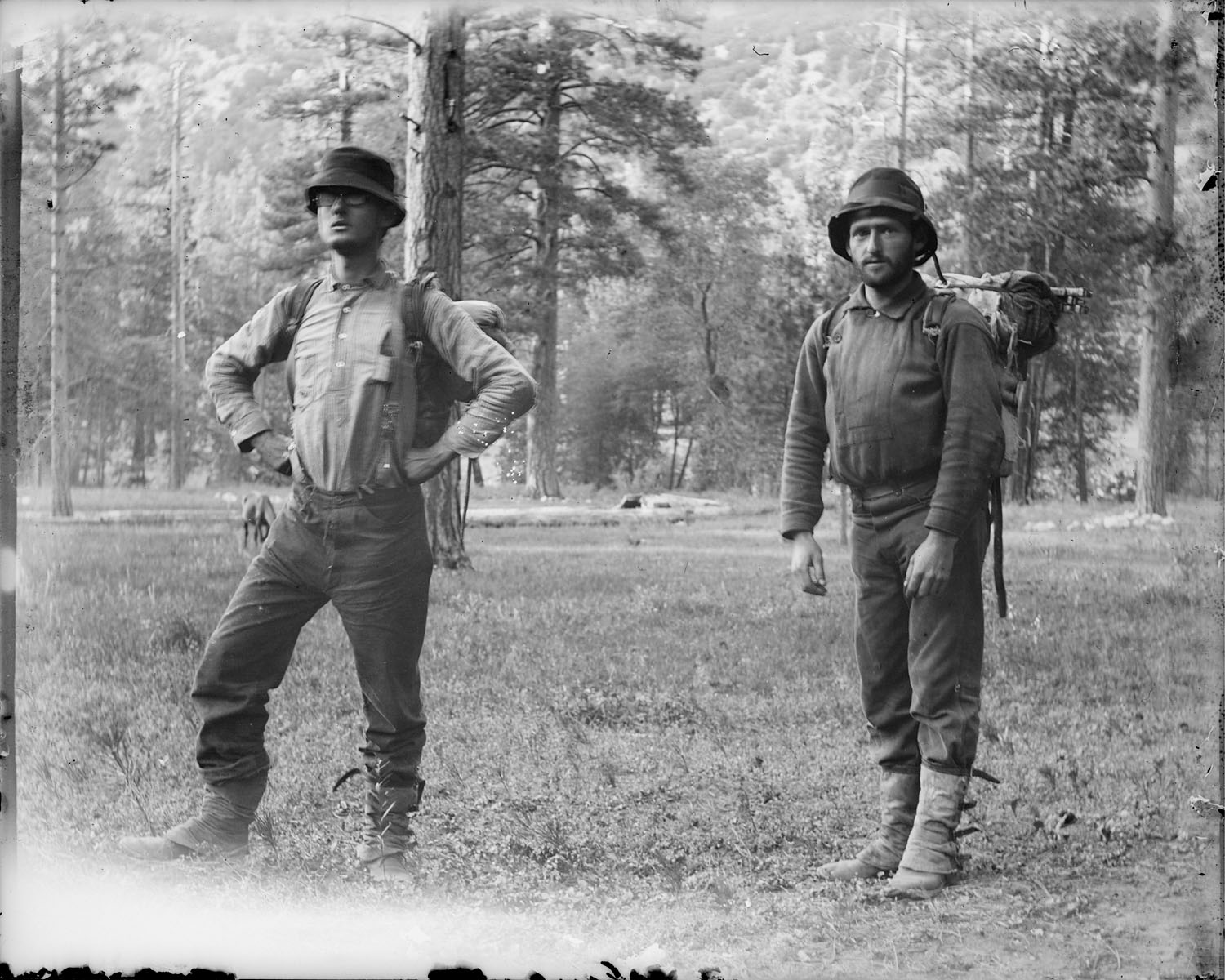
Bonner & Solomons, King's River Canyon, circa 1892-circa 1896

In his explorations, Solomons correctly determined the courses of the upper branches of the San Joaquin River. In 1892, accompanied by Joseph Nisbet LeConte and Sidney I. Peixotto, he crossed from Mount Lyell by way of Rush Creek to the base of Mount Ritter and ascended the peak. In 1895, Solomons took his most notable trip, accompanied by Ernest C. Bonner. Ascending the South Fork of the San Joaquin they came to the group of mountains now designated the Evolution Group, named by Solomons. The highest of these he called Mount Darwin (after the evolutionist Charles Darwin), and the others he named Haeckel, Wallace, Fiske, Spencer, and Huxley, after famous evolutionists of the day.

Continuing their explorations, Solomons and Bonner ascended Mount Goddard, then made their way down to Simpson Meadow via North Goddard Creek, and were the first to make this section known. Solomons’ excursions in the next two years added details to the knowledge of Sierra topography, but his principal contribution was an accurate map which he drafted and presented to the Sierra Club in 1896.

Although Solomons named the peaks of the Evolution Group and was the first to accurately map the region, the report from his 1895 trip is not the first written description of the area. As noted by Francis Farquhar in 1925, John Muir was the first to describe the then-unnamed Evolution Group of peaks. Muir's descriptions of his fall 1873 trek up the San Joaquin River provide enough geographic detail to make it clear that he explored Goddard Canyon and climbed through Evolution Valley to the peaks of the Evolution Group.

== Death and memorials ==
He died in Los Angeles, California, on May 27, 1947. Mount Solomons (13016') is named after him as well as the long-distance trail the Theodore Solomons Trail.
