= Mount Goddard =

Mountain in California, United States

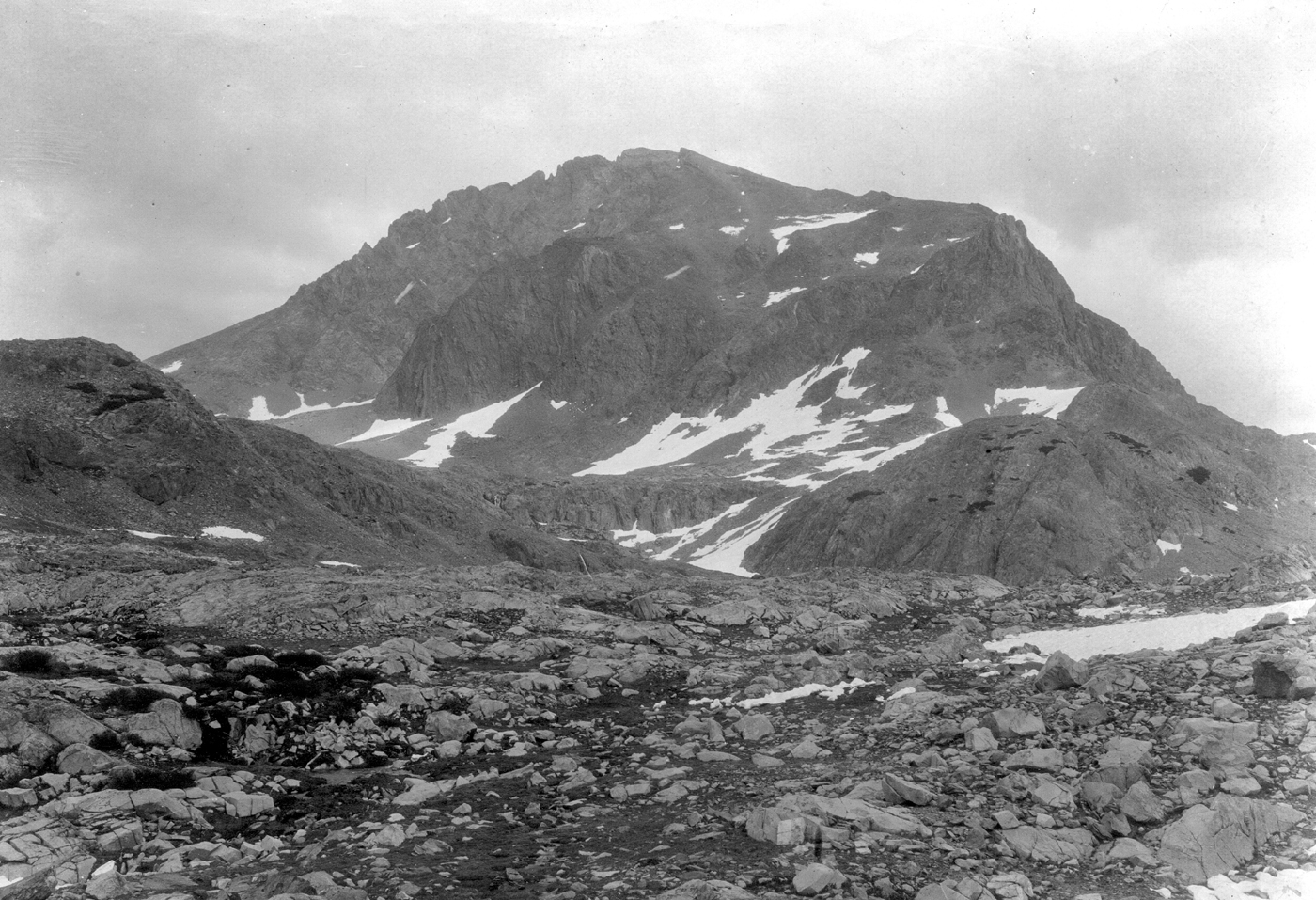
- Mt. Goddard from the south (G.K. Gilbert,1904).

Highest point
- Elevation: 13,564 ft (4,134 m) NAVD 88
- Prominence: 1,568 ft (478 m)
- Parent peak: Mount Darwin
- Listing: SPS Emblem peak; Western States Climbers Star peak
- Coordinates: 37°06′11″N 118°43′12″W

Geography
- Location within California
- Location: Kings Canyon National Park, Fresno County, California, U.S.
- Parent range: Sierra Nevada
- Topo map: USGS Mount Goddard

Climbing
- First ascent: September 23, 1879 by Lilbourne A. Winchell and Louis W. Davis
- Easiest route: Scramble, class 2 by Starr's Route or the East Slope

Mount Goddard is a mountain of California's Sierra Nevada, in the north section of Kings Canyon National Park. Goddard forms the southwest boundary of the Evolution Basin.

The peak is named for civil engineer George Henry Goddard, who surveyed the Sierra Nevada during the 1850s. The name was given by William Brewer's California Geological Survey party in 1864, during which year they made two unsuccessful attempts to climb the mountain.

Fifteen years later, Lilbourne Winchell and Louis Davis completed the first recorded ascent on September 23, 1879. They scrambled up class 2 rock from the east side of Martha Lake to Goddard Col, and a lake and chute beyond. From here they attained the summit by way of the Southwest Ridge, and a short class 3 ridge between the two summits of Mount Goddard.

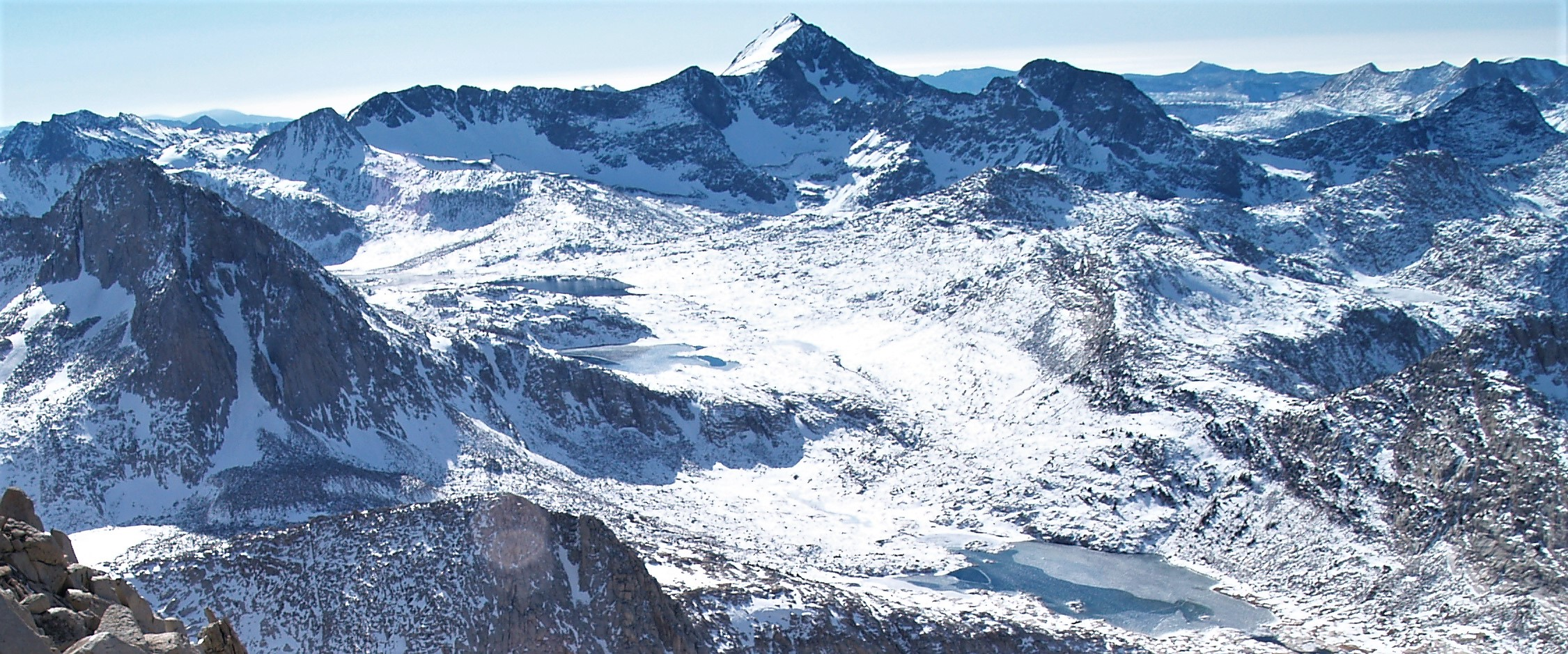
Mt. Goddard from the north-northeast at Mt. Darwin
