= Tehipite Valley =

Glacial valley in Kings Canyon National Park, California, USA

Coordinates: 36.909°N 118.782°W

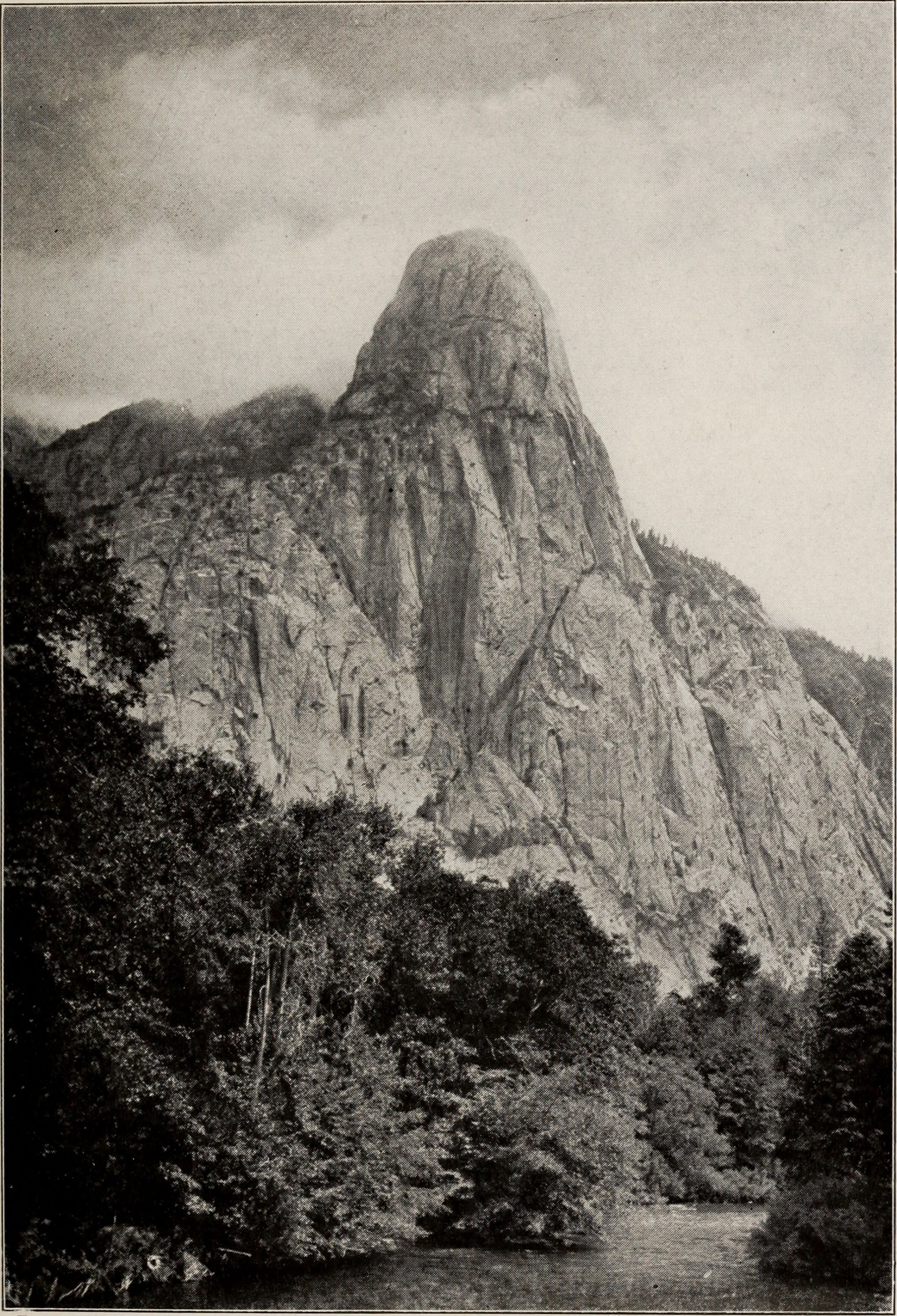
Tehipite Dome and the Middle Fork, c. 1920

Tehipite Valley, a glacial valley of the Middle Fork Kings River, is located in Kings Canyon National Park in the Sierra Nevada of California. The valley is in Fresno County about 45 miles (72 km) southwest of Bishop and 60 miles (97 km) east of Fresno and is known for its Yosemite-like scenery and its extreme isolation.

== Geography ==
The valley, about 1.5 miles (2.4 km) long and up to three-quarters of a mile (1.2 km) wide, is characterized by high, extremely steep granite walls, side canyons and waterfalls. The valley's scenery has been frequently compared to that of Yosemite Valley, starting with John Muir who first visited the area in the 1870s. It is situated just inside the western boundary of Kings Canyon National Park and on the northern edge of the Monarch Wilderness. The Middle Fork flows swiftly from northeast to southwest through the valley. The valley floor is at an elevation of 4,200 feet (1,300 m) while the surrounding peaks rise to heights of 8,000 feet (2,400 m) or more.

On a 1917 National Park Service expedition to Tehipite Valley, Robert Sterling Yard described the place as thus:

Tehipite Dome, now outlined against the sky, and the neighboring abrupt castellated walls, towered more hugely than ever. We did not need the map to know that some of these heights exceeded Yosemite's. The skyline was fantastically carved into spires and domes, a counterpart in gigantic miniature of the Great Sierra of which it was the valley climax. The Yosemite measure of sublimity, perhaps, lacked, but in its place was a more rugged grandeur, a certain suggestion of vastness and power that I have not seen elsewhere.

The north side of Tehipite Valley is dominated by Tehipite Dome, the largest granite dome in the Sierra Nevada, rising 3,500 feet (1,100 m) above the valley floor. Notable features of the valley include Silver Spray and Blue Canyon Falls, both cascades hundreds of feet high and the rugged, nearly inaccessible Gorge of Despair formed by Crystal Creek which provides "some of the finest technical rock climbing in the Sierra".

== History ==
The valley was named in 1869 by Frank Dusy, taking the Native American name for Tehipite Dome meaning "high rock". Dusy's expeditions were also the first to photograph the valley, doing so in 1879. Although Dusy is credited with being the first non-native person to visit the valley, he recorded in his journal that he followed a trail possibly used by prospectors in search of gold, several years earlier. Lilbourne A. Winchell, a member of the 1879 Dusy expedition, wrote of his initial impression of the valley:

...At 4 o'clock P.M. of Sunday, July 13th, we stood on the brink of the cliff and gazed with wonder and awe upon one of the grandest views to be found in the Sierras. A grassy slope reaches to the very edge of the chasm, the bottom of which is more than a vertical mile below, and as one looks shudderingly down the giddy abyss he sees the majestic stream of the Middle Fork, appearing no larger than a brook, as it glistened in the sun. To the east we beheld mountains of solid rock, capped with snow, and increasing in grandeur and height as they near the summit, which was dimly outlined against the sky, in the far distance. Lingering with enraptured visions we were loth to withdraw our eyes from a scene at once sublime and awe-inspiring, at the warning by the lengthened shadows, that our time was limited, so with reluctance we left the spot and pursued our way down the steep and difficult route that led to the bottom of the valley."

In 1897 Theodore S. Solomon made one of the first maps of the valley, on which was also the first recorded mention of "Gorge of Despair".

In the 1920s the City of Los Angeles proposed the Tehipite Valley as the site of a hydroelectric dam. This was one of the key controversies before, and for many years after the establishment of Kings Canyon National Park. The initial dedication of the park on March 4, 1940 by President Franklin D. Roosevelt did not include Tehipite Valley; it was not until 1965 when Tehipite Valley and Cedar Grove were finally added to the park, making them forever off-limits to industrial development.

== Access ==
The valley is known for its extreme remoteness, and is many miles from the nearest paved road (Highway 180). On some days, it receives no visitors at all. One of the major trails to the valley is the Tehipite Valley Trail, which begins at the access road for Wishon Dam. The National Park Service describes the hike to the valley rim as "moderate" and the descent into the valley as "very strenuous". Due to the high elevation of the incoming trails and heavy snows in winter, Tehipite Valley is inaccessible for up to eight months of the year. The difficulty of access is compounded by the fact that many trails have deteriorated. In addition the area is known for rattlesnakes.

There are primitive campsites in the valley, along the Middle Fork.

== See also ==
- Tehipite Valley jewelflower
