= Sawmill Pass =

Mountain Pass on California

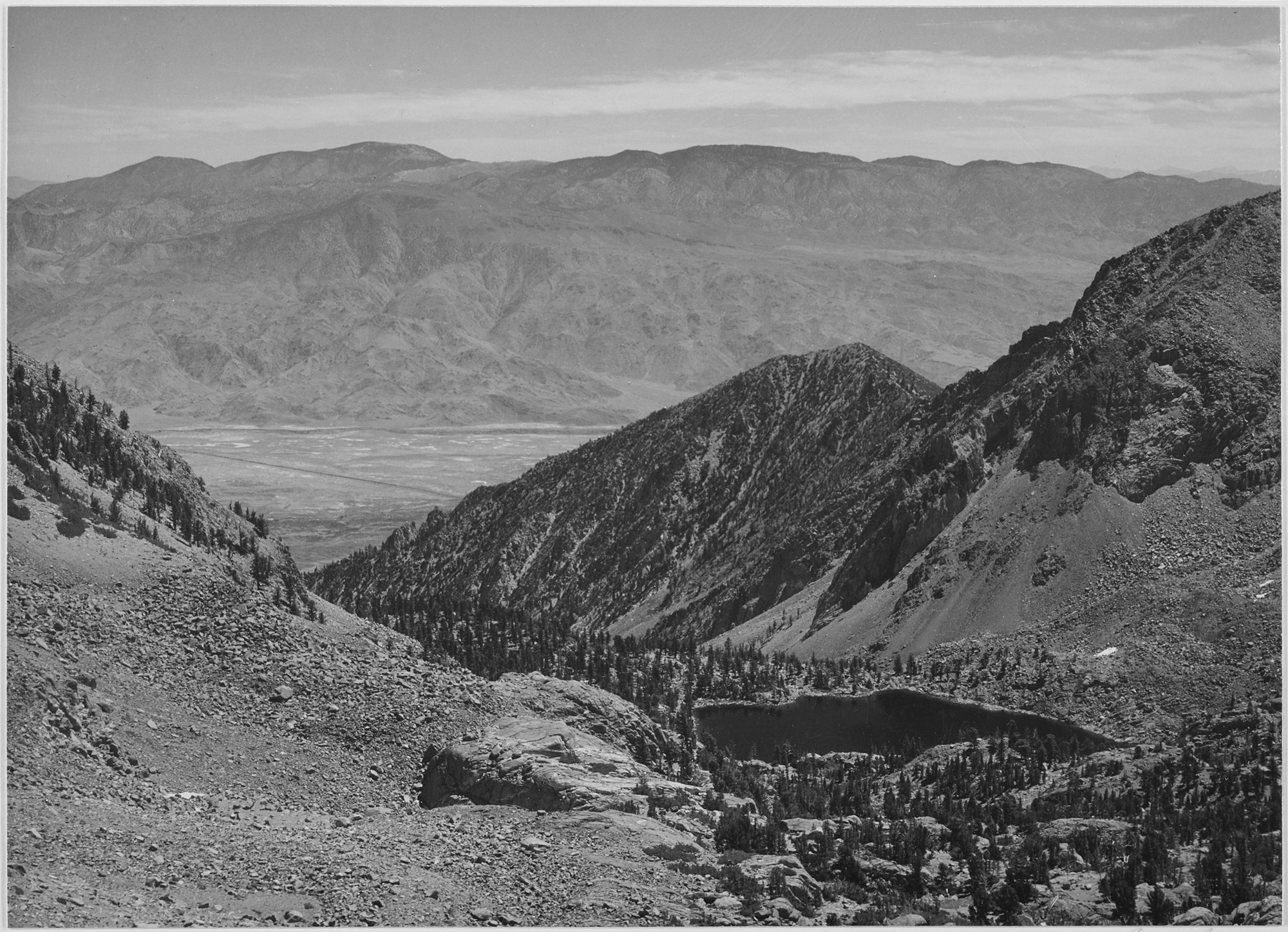
- View of the Owens Valley from Sawmill Pass, ca. 1936
- Interactive map of Sawmill Pass
- Elevation: 11,309 ft (3,447 m)
- Traversed by: Sawmill Pass Trail

Third Approach
- Location: Inyo and Fresno Counties, California
- Range: Sierra Nevada
- Coordinates: 36°52′59″N 118°21′52″W

Sawmill Pass, 11,309 ft (3,447 m), is a mountain pass in the southern Sierra Nevada, California on the border of the Inyo National Forest (John Muir Wilderness) to the east and Kings Canyon National Park to the west. The eastern approach via the Sawmill Pass Trail is steep and strenuous, climbing 6,700 ft (2,000 m) from the Owens Valley floor. To the west, it connects to the John Muir Trail/Pacific Crest Trail in the Sierra high country, along Woods Creek.
