= Boyden Cavern =

Cave in California, United States

Boyden Cave
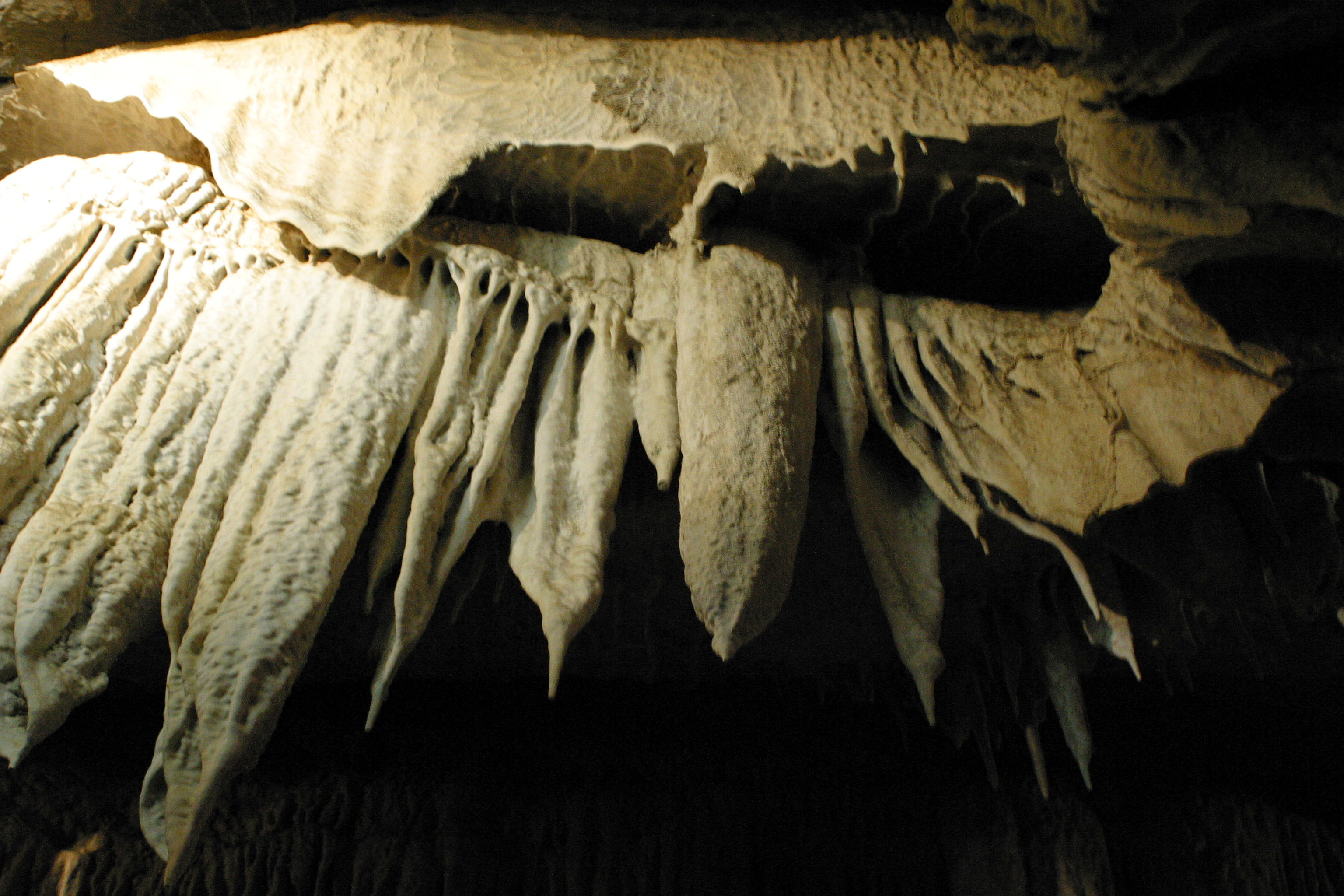

- Location within California Location within the United States
- Location: Giant Sequoia National Monument, Fresno County, California
- Coordinates: 36°48′54″N 118°49′05″W
- Length: 0.63 miles (1.01 km) surveyed
- Geology: Mesozoic marble
- Access: Public tours available

Boyden Cavern is a show cave located in the Giant Sequoia National Monument of the Sequoia National Forest, along the Kings Canyon Scenic Byway in Fresno County, California. It is just west of Kings Canyon National Park.

== Cavern ==
The cave is a solutional cave formed in Mesozoic marble (metamorphosed limestone). It is a cave with many varieties of natural speleothems, including rare "shield" formations. Boyden Cave or Boyden Cavern is located in the deepest river cut canyon of the United States, the 8,200-foot (2,500 m) deep Kings Canyon. The cave entrance lies beneath the 2,000-foot (610 m) high marble walls of the famous Portals of the Kings, near the Kings River.

== Tours ==
Regular tours of the cave are given by a licensed guide company from the last Friday in April to mid November. The tour includes the Pancake Room, a stalactite group called the Upside Down City, and a flowstone formation called Mother Nature's Wedding Cake. In the Bat Grotto bats spend summer days sleeping. The Drapery Room contains curtains, soda straws and helictites. The tour ends at a small subterranean stream. 0.63 miles (1.01 km) of the cave have been mapped.
