= Gamlin Cabin =

Historic cabin in California

- U.S. National Register of Historic Places
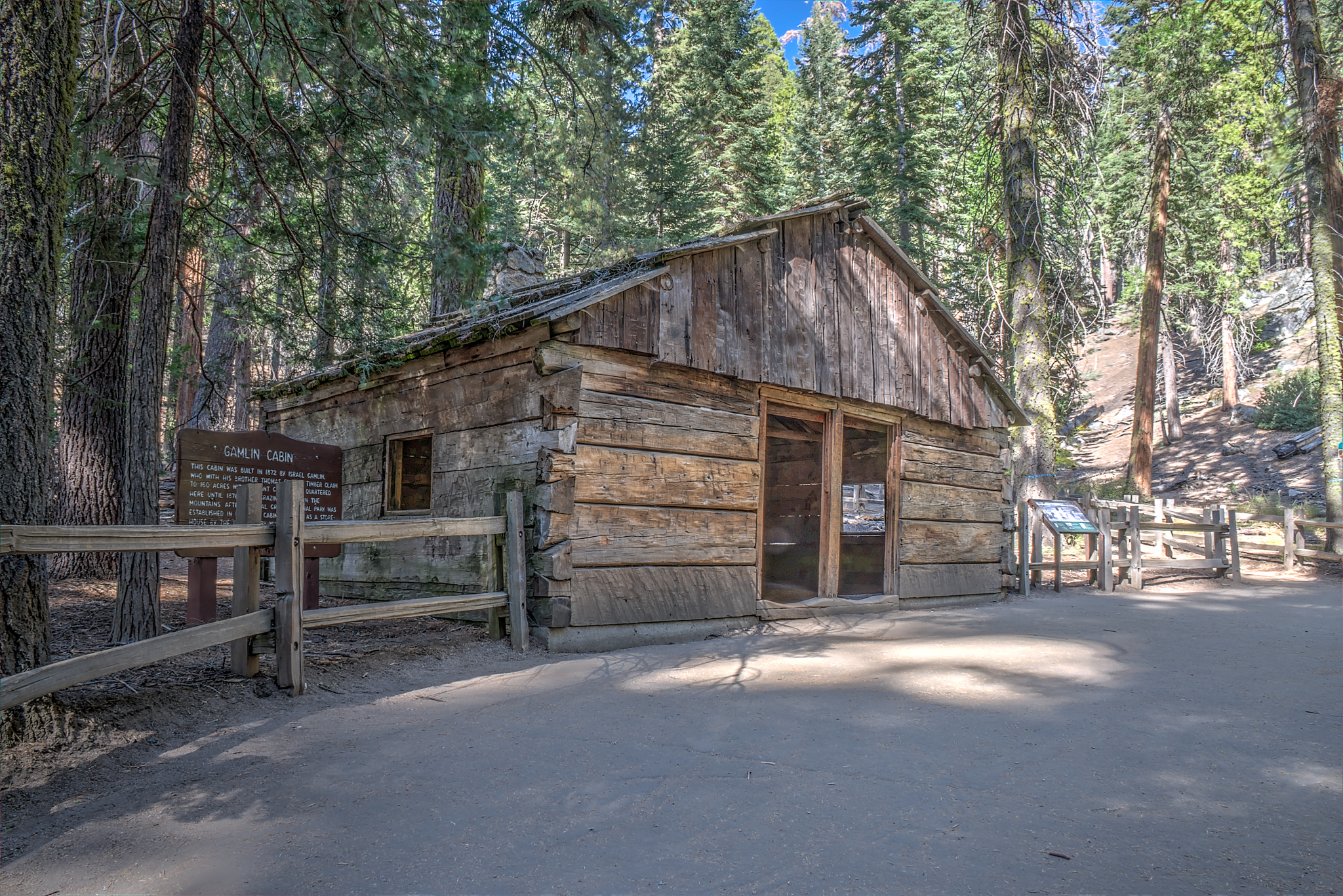
- Gamlin Cabin in 2017

- Location within California Location within the United States
- Location: General Grant Grove, Kings Canyon National Park
- Coordinates: 36.7495°N 118.9716°W
- Built: 1872
- Architect: Israel and Thomas Gamlin
- NRHP reference No.: 77000123
- Added to NRHP: March 8, 1977

Gamlin's Cabin is a historic cabin in General Grant Grove in Kings Canyon National Park. It can be passed on a loop trail to General Grant, being about 200 ft (61 m) northwest of the tree itself. The building was added to the National Register of Historic Places on March 8, 1977. It is the first building constructed in the grove and the oldest surviving one in the national park.

== History ==
The cabin was built by the New Englanders Israel and Thomas Gamlin in 1872. (Note: Thomas Gamlin may have participated in the building of the cabin, but the descendants of the Gamlin family today say he did not.) The brothers filed a claim to use 160 acres (65 hectares) of land in General Grant Grove for logging. They had previously lived in the Fallen Monarch, a fallen sequoia that was fully carved out. While grazing sheep at higher elevations, the two used the cabin for six years until 1878, when the United States General Land Office recommended that the area around the building be preserved as a public park. They made a deal in which the Gamlins would give up their claims to the area in exchange for land in another area. The Gamlins kept their part of the bargain, but the GLO did not, never giving them their land. The Gamlins eventually moved to Idaho in search of unclaimed land.

After the establishment of General Grant (now Kings Canyon) National Park in 1890, the United States Cavalry used it for hay and grain storage from 1891 to 1901. It later became the living area of the first civilian park ranger, Lewis L. Davis, between 1902 and 1909. There, Davis learned about the sequoia's relationship with fire and raised young plants. During the winter of 1931–32, a falling tree damaged the roof. Due to the building's age, plans were made to reconstruct it, with the restoration happening in 1933.

== Features ==
The logs of which the building is composed are made out of hand-hewn squared sugar pine timers, with the roof shingles being made out of sequoia. Each sugar pine log averages 7 by 15 in (18 by 38 cm). The cabin only has one room, measuring 24.5 by 18 ft (7.5 by 5.5 m). It also has two windows and doors, with a dirt floor. There are no interior decorations, except for a stone fireplace on the rear wall.

The cabin has been moved twice since its original construction. The first was by the U.S. Cavalry who dismantled the cabin log by log and reconstructed it 0.66 mi (1.06 km) southeast in 1892. The second was to move it back to its original area, occurring in the fall of 1932, with the help of Thomas Gamlin, one of the original builders. Gamlin assisted in finding the original location of the cabin so it could be reconstructed in 1933. The historical accuracy of the building is disputed, as there are no surviving photographs of the building prior to its restoration. Most of the same materials from the original cabin were used, but the fireplace and roof had to be recreated during the process.

In the years since the area in front of the cabin has been updated with asphalt concrete trails and interpretive signs.
