= Kings Canyon National Park =

National park in California, United States

- IUCN category II (national park)
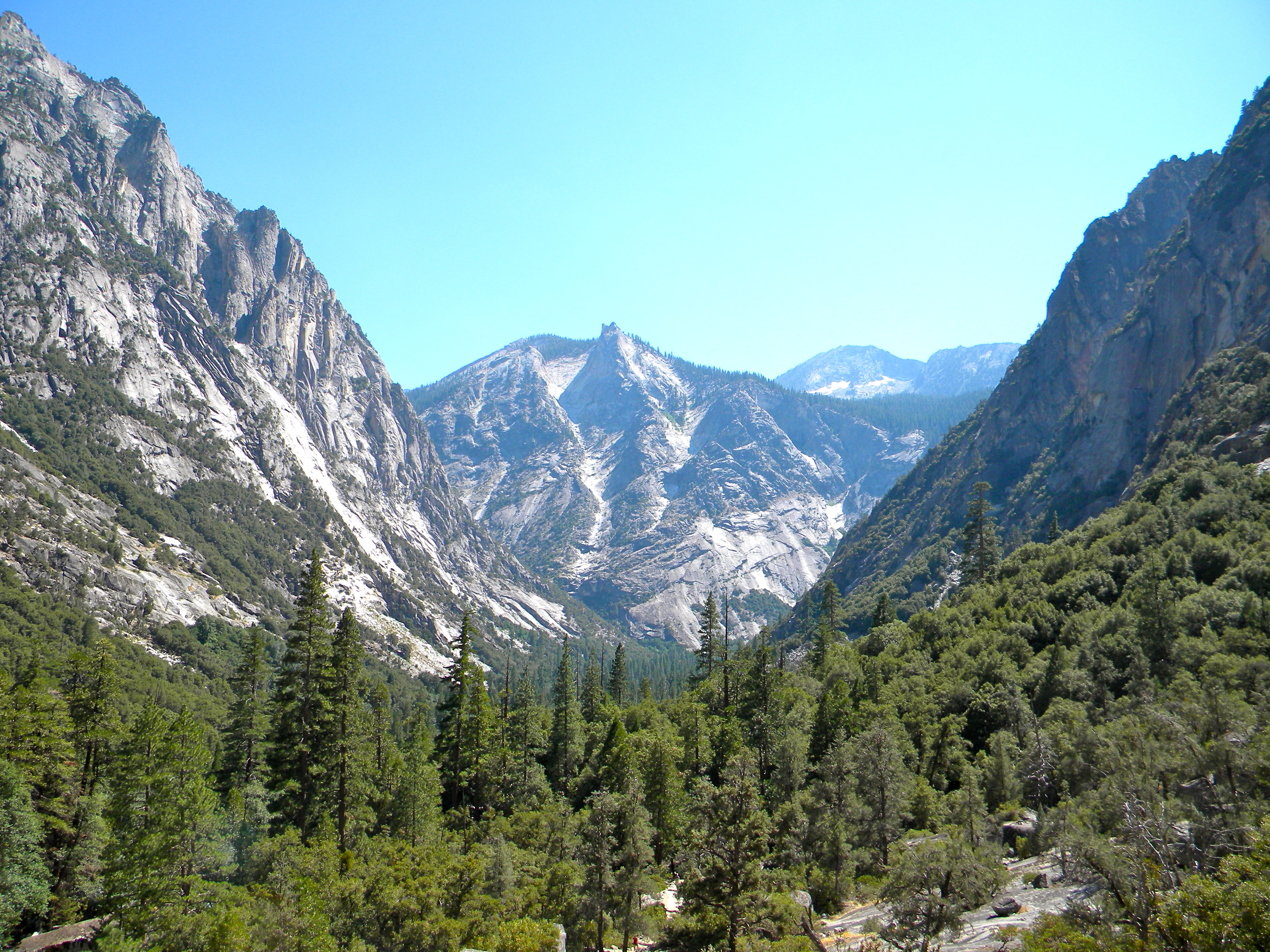
- View of Kings Canyon, looking south from Paradise Valley. The Sphinx centered.
- Interactive map of Kings Canyon National Park
- Location: Fresno and Tulare counties, California
- Nearest city: Fresno
- Coordinates: 36°47′21″N 118°40′22″W
- Area: 461,901 acres (1,869.25 km^{2})
- Established: October 1, 1890; 136 years ago as General Grant National Park; March 4, 1940; 86 years ago as Kings Canyon National Park
- Visitors: 640,986 (in 2022)
- Governing body: National Park Service
- Website: www.nps.gov/seki/index.htm

Kings Canyon National Park is a national park of the United States in the southern Sierra Nevada, in Fresno and Tulare Counties, California. Originally established in 1890 as General Grant National Park, the park was greatly expanded and renamed on March 4, 1940. The park's namesake, Kings Canyon, is a rugged glacier-carved valley more than a mile (1,600 m) deep. Other natural features include multiple 14,000-foot (4,300 m) peaks, high mountain meadows, swift-flowing rivers, and some of the world's largest stands of giant sequoia trees. Kings Canyon is north of and contiguous with Sequoia National Park, and both parks are jointly administered by the National Park Service as the Sequoia and Kings Canyon National Parks.

The majority of the 461,901-acre (186,925 ha) park, drained by the Middle and South Forks of the Kings River and many smaller streams, is designated wilderness. Tourist facilities are concentrated in two areas: Grant Grove, home to General Grant (the second largest tree in the world, measured by trunk volume) and Cedar Grove, located in the heart of Kings Canyon. Overnight hiking is required to access most of the park's backcountry, or high country, which for much of the year is covered in deep snow. The combined Pacific Crest Trail/John Muir Trail, a backpacking route, traverses the entire length of the park from north to south.

General Grant National Park was initially created to protect a small area of giant sequoias from logging. Although John Muir's visits brought public attention to the huge wilderness area to the east, it took more than fifty years for the rest of Kings Canyon to be designated a national park. Environmental groups, park visitors and many local politicians wanted to see the area preserved; however, development interests wanted to build hydroelectric dams in the canyon. Even after President Franklin D. Roosevelt expanded the park in 1940, the fight continued until 1965, when the Cedar Grove and Tehipite Valley dam sites were finally annexed into the park.

As visitation rose post–World War II, further debate took place over whether the park should be developed as a tourist resort, or retained as a more natural environment restricted to simpler recreation such as hiking and camping. Ultimately, the preservation lobby prevailed and today, the park has only limited services and lodgings despite its size. Due to this and the lack of road access to most of the park, Kings Canyon remains the least visited of the major Sierra parks, with just under 700,000 visitors in 2017 compared to 1.3 million visitors at Sequoia and over 4 million at Yosemite.

== Geography and natural history ==
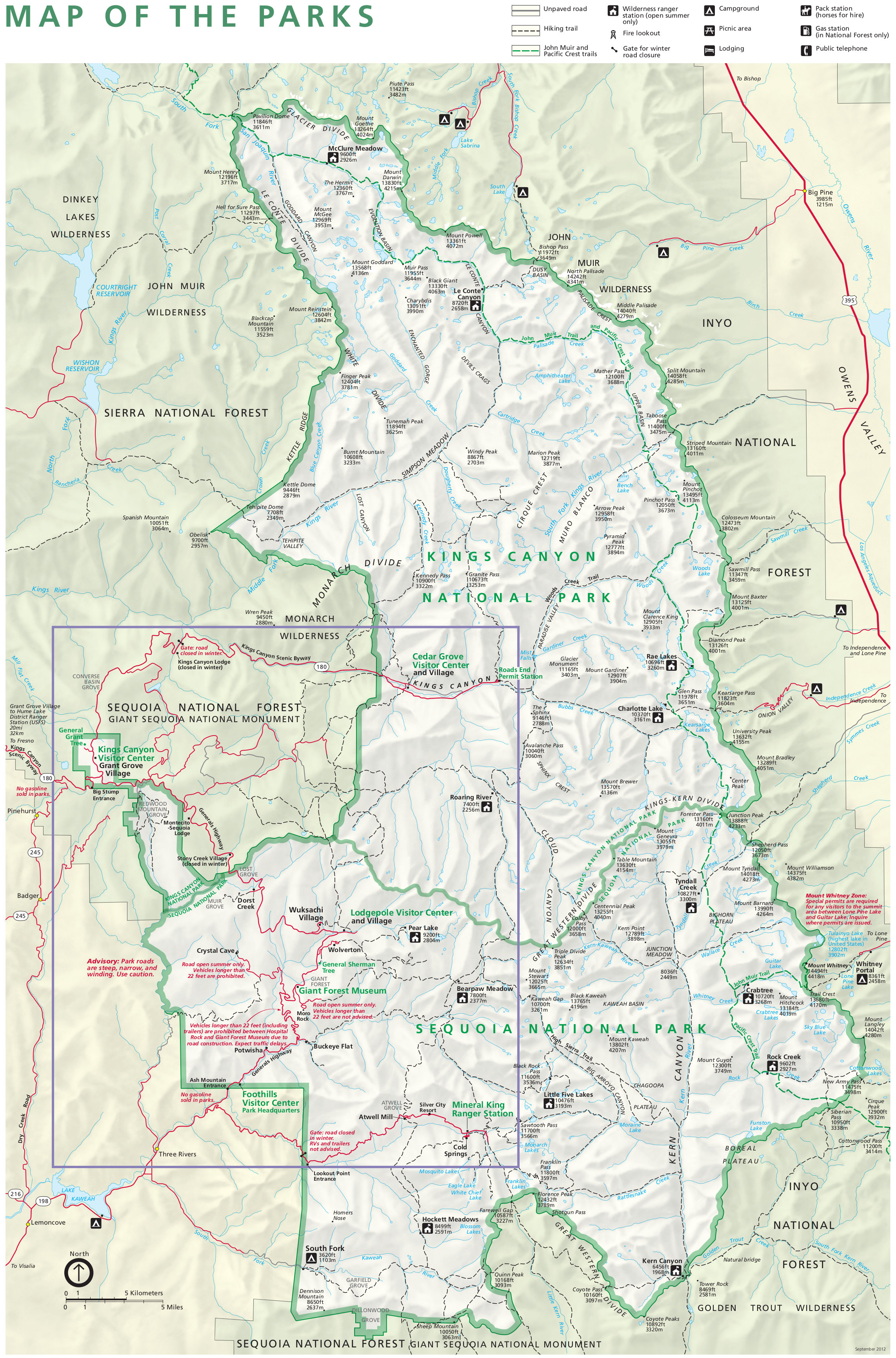
Map of Kings Canyon National Park (click to enlarge)

Kings Canyon National Park, located on the western slope of the Sierra Nevada to the east of the San Joaquin Valley, is divided into two distinct sections. The smaller and older western section centers around Grant Grove – home of many of the park's sequoias – and has most of the visitor facilities. The larger eastern section, which accounts for the majority of the park's area, is almost entirely wilderness, and contains the deep canyons of the Middle and South Forks of the Kings River. Cedar Grove, located at the bottom of the Kings Canyon, is the only part of the park's vast eastern portion accessible by road (via Highway 180). Although most of the park is forested, much of the eastern section consists of alpine regions above the tree line. Usually snow-free only from late June until late October, the high country is accessible solely via foot and horse trails.

The Sequoia-Kings Canyon Wilderness encompasses over 768,000 acres (311,000 ha) in Kings Canyon and Sequoia National Parks, or nearly 90 percent of their combined area. In addition to Sequoia National Park on the south, Kings Canyon is surrounded by multiple national forests and wilderness areas. The Sierra National Forest, Sequoia National Forest and Inyo National Forest border it on the northwest, west and east, respectively. The John Muir Wilderness wraps around much of the northern half of the park, and the Monarch Wilderness preserves much of the area between the park's two sections.

=== Mountains and valleys ===
Kings Canyon is characterized by some of the steepest vertical relief in North America, with numerous peaks over 14,000 feet (4,300 m) on the Sierra Crest along the park's eastern border, falling to 4,500 feet (1,400 m) in the valley floor of Cedar Grove just ten miles (16 km) to the west. The Sierran crest forms the eastern boundary of the park, from Mount Goethe in the north, down to Junction Peak, at the boundary with Sequoia National Park. Several passes cross the crest into the park, including Bishop Pass, Taboose Pass, Sawmill Pass, and Kearsarge Pass. All of these passes are above 11,000 feet (3,400 m) in elevation.

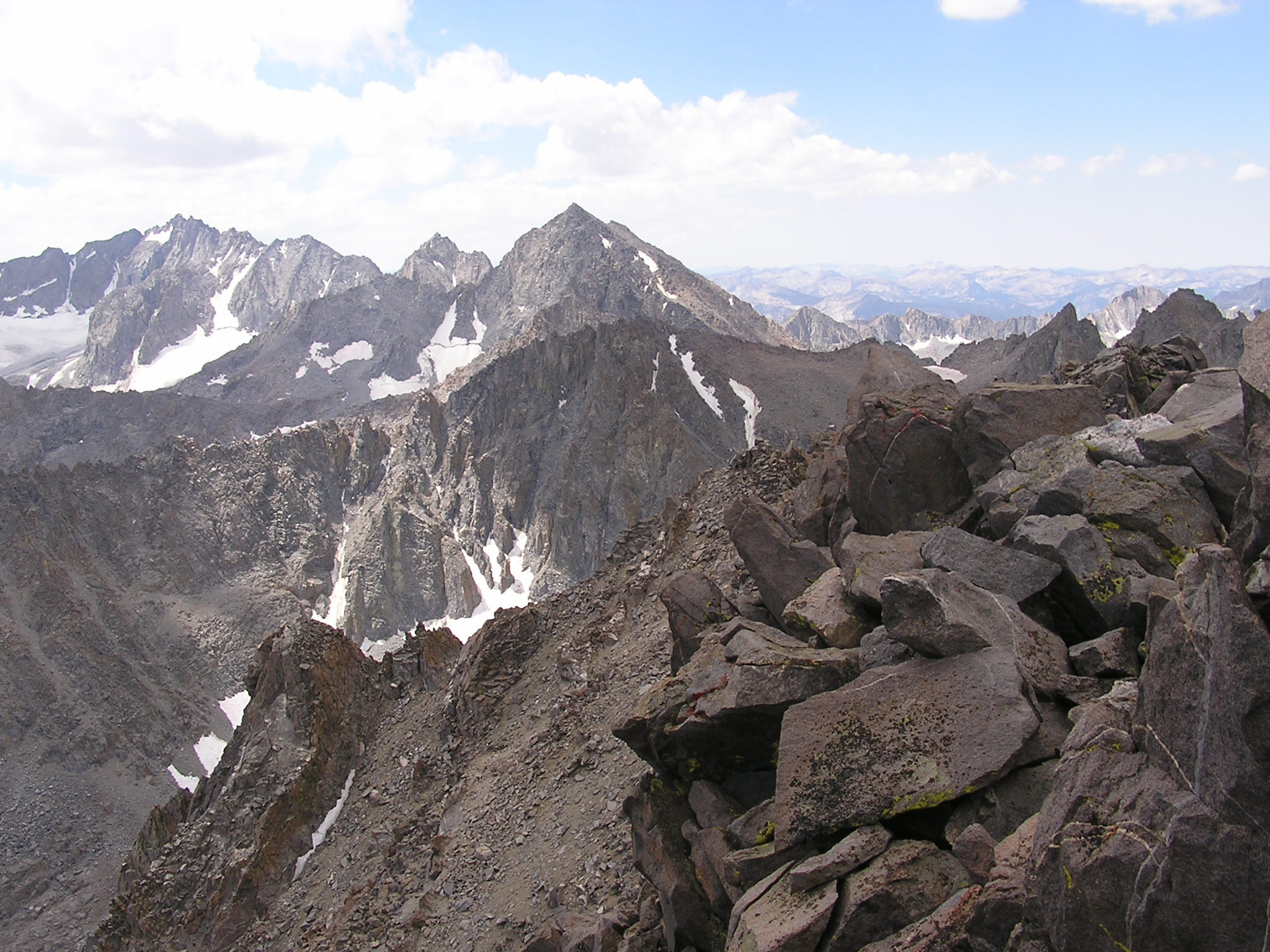
Mount Agassiz is located on the Sierra Crest along the eastern edge of the park.

There are several prominent subranges of the Sierra within and around the park. The Palisades, along the park's eastern boundary, have four peaks over 14,000 feet (4,300 m) including the highest point in the park, 14,248 feet (4,343 m) NAVD 88 at the summit of North Palisade. The Great Western Divide extends through the south-central part of the park and also has many peaks over 13,000 feet (4,000 m), including Mount Brewer. The Monarch Divide, stretching between the lower Middle and South Forks of the Kings, has some of the most inaccessible terrain in the entire park. In the northwest section of the park are other very steep and rugged ranges such as the Goddard Divide, LeConte Divide and Black Divide, all of which are dotted with high mountain lakes and separated by deep chasms.

Most of the mountains and canyons, as in other parts of the Sierra Nevada, are formed in igneous intrusive rocks such as granite, diorite and monzonite, formed at least 100 million years ago due to subduction along the North American–Pacific Plate boundary. However, the Sierra itself is a young mountain range, no more than 10 million years old. Huge tectonic forces along the western edge of the Great Basin forced the local crustal block to tilt and uplift, creating the mountains' gradual slope to the west and the nearly vertical escarpment to the east bordering the Owens Valley. Many cave systems are also formed in the rock layers, including Boyden Cave along the South Fork of the Kings River.

=== Glacial features ===
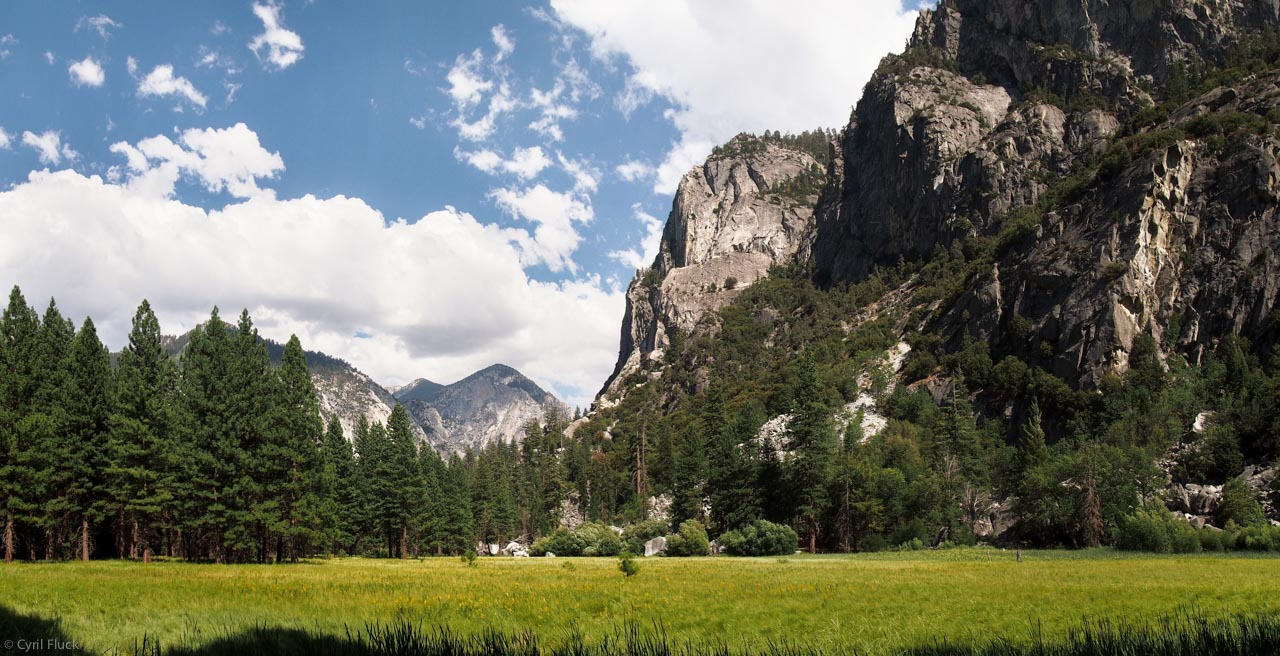
The upper part of Kings Canyon, seen here at Zumwalt Meadow, was carved out by Ice Age glaciers.

The present shape of the high country was largely sculpted by glaciations during successive Ice Ages over the last 2.5 million years. Large valley glaciers moved as far as 44 miles (71 km) down the South and Middle Forks of the Kings River, carving out the distinctive deep U-shaped valleys at Cedar Grove and Paradise Valley on the South Fork, and Tehipite Valley on the Middle Fork. Ice Age glaciations did not extend all the way to the confluence of the Middle and South Forks; consequently, the canyons downstream of Cedar Grove and Tehipite are typical V-shaped river gorges, in contrast to the U-shaped valleys upstream.

The glacial valleys are characterized by flat floors and exposed granite cliffs and domes many thousands of feet high, similar in form to the more famous Yosemite Valley to the north, and in fact the term "yosemite" was used in the 19th century by John Muir to describe these valleys before they were widely known by their own names. In A Rival of the Yosemite, published in 1891 in The Century Illustrated Monthly Magazine, Muir wrote of Kings Canyon:

In the vast Sierra wilderness far to the southward of the famous Yosemite Valley, there is a yet grander valley of the same kind. It is situated on the south fork of the Kings River, above the most extensive groves and forests of the giant sequoia, and beneath the shadows of the highest mountains in the range, where the cañons are deepest and the snow-laden peaks are crowded most closely together. It is called the Big King's River Cañon, or King's River Yosemite ... The stupendous rocks of purplish gray granite that form the walls are from 2500 to 5000 feet in height, while the depth of the valley is considerably more than a mile.

The bottom of the valley ... is diversified with flowery meadows and groves and open sunny flats, through the midst of which the crystal river, ever changing, ever beautiful, makes its way; now gliding softly with scarce a ripple over beds of brown pebbles, now rustling and leaping in wild exultation across avalanche rock-dams or terminal moraines ... From this long, flowery, forested, well-watered park the walls rise abruptly in plain precipices or richly sculptured masses partly separated by side cañons baring wonderful wealth and variety of architectural forms.

From the brink of the walls on either side the ground still rises in a series of ice-carved ridges and basins, superbly forested and adorned with many small lakes and meadows where deer and bear find grateful homes; while from the head of the valley other mountains rise beyond in glorious array, every one of them shining with rock crystals and snow, and with a network of streams that sing their way down from lake to lake through a labyrinth of ice-burnished cañons.

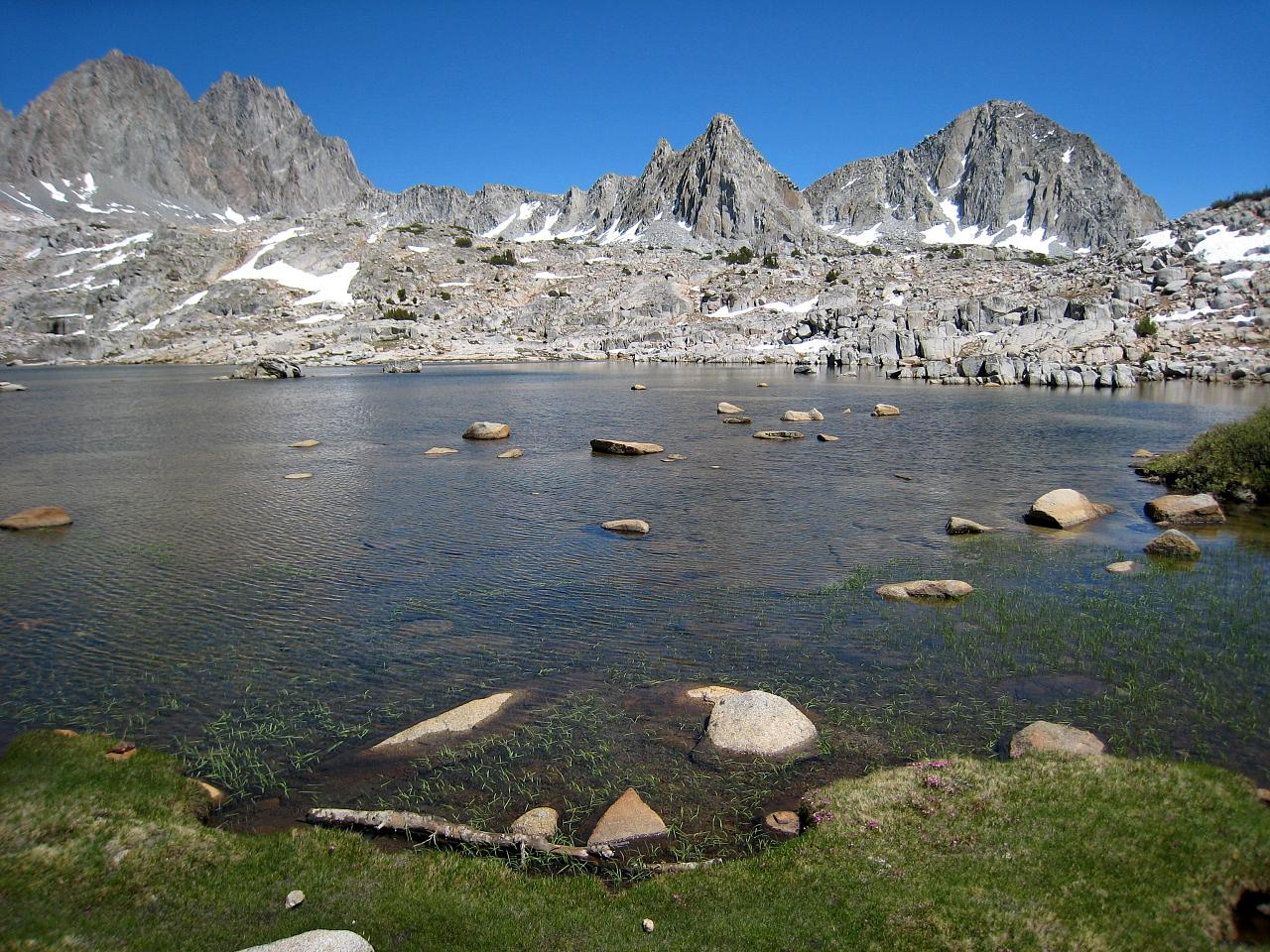
Dusy Basin includes many small lakes, such as this one, carved by glaciers from granite.

Other significant glacial features include Tehipite Dome, the largest granite dome in the Sierra, rising 3,500 feet (1,100 m) above the floor of Tehipite Valley. In Kings Canyon and across the high country, such sheer granite cliffs are subject to exfoliation, frost weathering and earthquakes which cause sudden and dramatic rockfalls. Over thousands of years, cliff collapses have built up large talus piles or scree slopes at their bases along almost every glacial valley in the park.

Zumwalt Meadow, one of the few large areas of flat land in the park, was formed by the accumulation of sediment behind the terminal moraine of a retreating glacier. In Kings Canyon there are in fact four such moraines, which the Kings River cascades over, forming whitewater rapids, in an area where it otherwise winds calmly across meadows. The series of moraines one behind the other are termed "nested moraines", each created during a different glacial period by glaciers of varying length.

Elsewhere in the high country, the landscape of bare rock and talus left by former glaciers is replete with hanging valleys, waterfalls, serrated ridges (arêtes), cirques, and hundreds of alpine tarns. Some of the highest peaks retain permanent snowfields and even glaciers. Palisade Glacier, the largest in the Sierra, is located near the park's edge in the John Muir Wilderness. These glaciers are not holdovers from the Ice Ages; rather, they were most likely formed during cold periods in the last 1,000 years. The park's glaciers are now melting rapidly due to increased temperatures, and may disappear completely within a few decades.

=== Watersheds ===
The Roaring River, a tributary of the South Fork Kings River

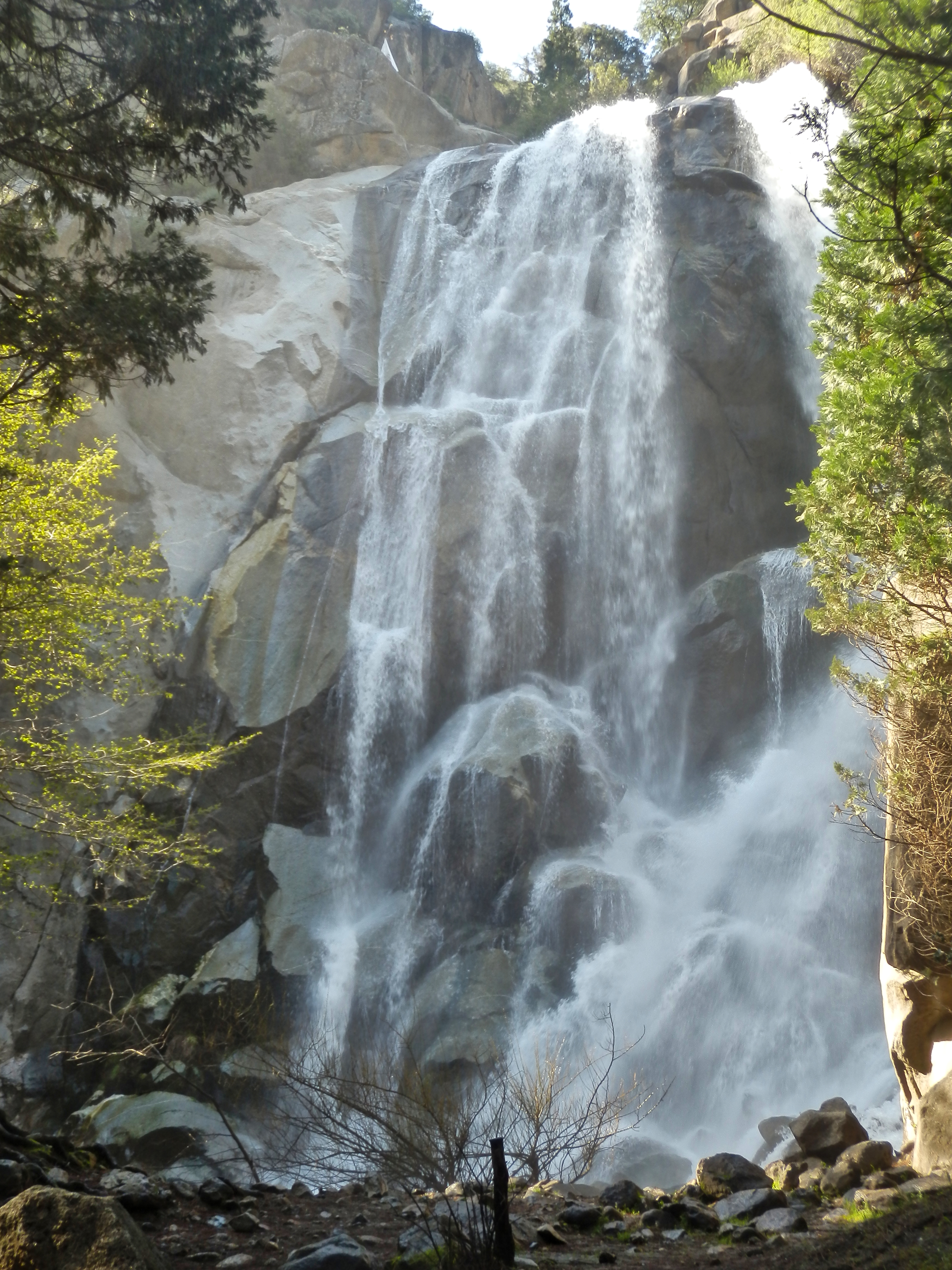
Grizzly Falls, near Cedar Grove

A number of major Sierra rivers have their origins in the park. The South Fork Kings River flows from near Taboose Pass, on the park's eastern boundary, and drains much of the southern half of the park, carving the canyon from which the park takes its name. The Middle Fork Kings River originates near Mount Powell and drains most of the park's northern half. A smaller section in the northern tip of the park is drained by the South Fork of the San Joaquin River. The Kings River falls more than 13,000 feet (4,000 m) from the Sierra crest to Pine Flat Reservoir in the San Joaquin Valley – the longest undammed drop of any North American river.

Most of the park's borders are formed by watershed divides between river basins. The eastern boundary follows the Sierra Crest, which to the east is drained by the Owens River, part of the Great Basin watershed. The southern boundary with Sequoia National Park is the divide between the Kings, Kaweah and Kern Rivers. Part of the western boundary follows the divide between the Middle and North Forks of the Kings River.

The forks of the Kings River converge in the Sequoia National Forest, a few miles outside the western boundary of the park, to form the main stem of the river. Here, the river forms one of the deepest canyons in North America, its walls rising as much as 8,200 feet (2,500 m) from river to rim – about half a mile (0.8 km) deeper than the Grand Canyon. The canyons upstream at Cedar Grove are also more than 5,000 feet (1,500 m) deep. Although the geology and topography of Cedar Grove and Tehipite Valley are similar to that of Yosemite Valley, the park does not have waterfalls as high and spectacular as those in Yosemite. There are several powerful but short waterfalls including Mist Falls, Roaring River Falls and Grizzly Falls in the Cedar Grove area. The backcountry is home to some much higher falls. Silver Spray Falls in Tehipite Valley drops about 700 feet (210 m) in several tiers. In a 1910 article in Out West, Ernestine Winchell describes the falls and Tehipite Valley:

... We paused a moment at the colossal doorway where Tehipite, shimmering through spaces of summer sunshine, in peaceful grandeur compelled our reverential gaze ... Across the river and below the dome Crown Creek races in sparkling cascades to grind a score of horrible pot-holes big enough to swallow a horse and rider; leaves that ferocious task to foam lightly down a cliff as Silver Spray Fall, whirls lazily at its foot, and then hurries to join King's River in its journey to the desert.

Both the Kings and San Joaquin Rivers flow west into the arid San Joaquin Valley; however, while the San Joaquin eventually empties into San Francisco Bay, the Kings ends in the terminal sink of Tulare Lake, which – before its waters were diverted for irrigation – was one of the largest freshwater lakes in the western United States. The seasonal rise and fall of the park's rivers is driven by heavy snowfall (typically between November and April) followed by a rapid melt during May and June. Runoff drops significantly by late July (or August in wet years), and rivers are usually a trickle by autumn. Snow accumulations in the higher areas of Kings Canyon National Park can be extremely large, often totaling in the hundreds of inches, although the annual snowpack fluctuates greatly between wet and dry years.

== Climate ==
According to the Köppen climate classification system, most of Kings Canyon National Park has a warm-summer Mediterranean climate (Csb), with only the lowest of elevations having a hot-summer Mediterranean climate (Csa). According to the United States Department of Agriculture, the Plant Hardiness zone at Cedar Grove Visitor Center at 4,613 ft (1,406 m) elevation is 8a with an average annual extreme minimum temperature of 12.3 °F (−10.9 °C).

Climate data for Grant Grove, California, 1991–2020 normals, extremes 1940–present
Month	Jan	Feb	Mar	Apr	May	Jun	Jul	Aug	Sep	Oct	Nov	Dec	Year
Record high °F (°C)	67 (19)	69 (21)	69 (21)	75 (24)	83 (28)	90 (32)	91 (33)	90 (32)	89 (32)	82 (28)	75 (24)	70 (21)	91 (33)
Mean maximum °F (°C)	58.8 (14.9)	58.8 (14.9)	61.2 (16.2)	67.1 (19.5)	74.0 (23.3)	81.7 (27.6)	85.9 (29.9)	85.4 (29.7)	81.4 (27.4)	74.2 (23.4)	65.9 (18.8)	59.6 (15.3)	87.4 (30.8)
Mean daily maximum °F (°C)	46.2 (7.9)	46.0 (7.8)	48.3 (9.1)	51.8 (11.0)	59.8 (15.4)	70.7 (21.5)	78.8 (26.0)	78.5 (25.8)	72.7 (22.6)	62.6 (17.0)	52.5 (11.4)	45.5 (7.5)	59.5 (15.3)
Daily mean °F (°C)	35.9 (2.2)	35.5 (1.9)	37.8 (3.2)	41.0 (5.0)	48.7 (9.3)	58.2 (14.6)	65.6 (18.7)	65.4 (18.6)	60.1 (15.6)	50.7 (10.4)	42.2 (5.7)	35.4 (1.9)	48.0 (8.9)
Mean daily minimum °F (°C)	25.7 (−3.5)	25.0 (−3.9)	27.2 (−2.7)	30.2 (−1.0)	37.6 (3.1)	45.7 (7.6)	52.5 (11.4)	52.3 (11.3)	47.4 (8.6)	38.8 (3.8)	31.9 (−0.1)	25.4 (−3.7)	36.6 (2.6)
Mean minimum °F (°C)	12.4 (−10.9)	13.0 (−10.6)	14.1 (−9.9)	16.7 (−8.5)	25.9 (−3.4)	32.6 (0.3)	44.4 (6.9)	43.3 (6.3)	34.8 (1.6)	26.5 (−3.1)	18.8 (−7.3)	12.6 (−10.8)	8.1 (−13.3)
Record low °F (°C)	−6 (−21)	−4 (−20)	0 (−18)	6 (−14)	13 (−11)	22 (−6)	25 (−4)	27 (−3)	21 (−6)	11 (−12)	8 (−13)	−4 (−20)	−6 (−21)
Average precipitation inches (mm)	8.03 (204)	7.33 (186)	7.81 (198)	3.58 (91)	1.37 (35)	0.53 (13)	0.27 (6.9)	0.16 (4.1)	0.32 (8.1)	2.37 (60)	3.26 (83)	6.63 (168)	41.66 (1,057.1)
Average snowfall inches (cm)	37.7 (96)	44.8 (114)	35.1 (89)	20.0 (51)	4.9 (12)	0.6 (1.5)	0.0 (0.0)	0.0 (0.0)	0.0 (0.0)	3.5 (8.9)	8.6 (22)	30.8 (78)	186.0 (472)
Average precipitation days (≥ 0.01 in)	8.7	10.5	9.5	7.5	4.6	1.9	1.2	0.9	1.8	3.7	5.7	8.2	64.2
Average snowy days (≥ 0.1 in)	7.3	8.0	6.8	5.4	2.2	0.3	0.0	0.0	0.0	1.0	3.2	6.4	40.6
Source: NOAA

Climate data for Cedar Grove Visitor Center, Kings Canyon National Park. Elev: 4,783 ft (1,458 m)
Month	Jan	Feb	Mar	Apr	May	Jun	Jul	Aug	Sep	Oct	Nov	Dec	Year
Mean daily maximum °F (°C)	54.1 (12.3)	54.4 (12.4)	58.3 (14.6)	62.1 (16.7)	71.7 (22.1)	79.7 (26.5)	87.0 (30.6)	87.5 (30.8)	82.2 (27.9)	72.0 (22.2)	60.0 (15.6)	51.6 (10.9)	68.5 (20.3)
Daily mean °F (°C)	40.6 (4.8)	41.3 (5.2)	44.5 (6.9)	48.5 (9.2)	56.0 (13.3)	63.3 (17.4)	71.4 (21.9)	71.3 (21.8)	64.1 (17.8)	55.1 (12.8)	45.6 (7.6)	38.4 (3.6)	53.4 (11.9)
Mean daily minimum °F (°C)	27.1 (−2.7)	28.1 (−2.2)	30.8 (−0.7)	34.9 (1.6)	40.3 (4.6)	46.9 (8.3)	55.8 (13.2)	55.0 (12.8)	46.1 (7.8)	38.2 (3.4)	31.2 (−0.4)	25.2 (−3.8)	38.4 (3.6)
Average precipitation inches (mm)	7.38 (187)	6.80 (173)	6.63 (168)	3.26 (83)	1.64 (42)	0.66 (17)	0.35 (8.9)	0.13 (3.3)	0.25 (6.4)	1.57 (40)	4.14 (105)	6.00 (152)	38.81 (986)
Average relative humidity (%)	44.8	52.5	54.7	49.8	47.5	42.6	36.8	34.2	33.5	35.7	43.0	44.1	43.2
Average dew point °F (°C)	20.8 (−6.2)	25.2 (−3.8)	29.2 (−1.6)	30.6 (−0.8)	36.3 (2.4)	40.2 (4.6)	43.6 (6.4)	41.6 (5.3)	34.8 (1.6)	28.4 (−2.0)	24.4 (−4.2)	18.4 (−7.6)	31.2 (−0.4)
Source: PRISM Climate Group

== Plants and wildlife ==
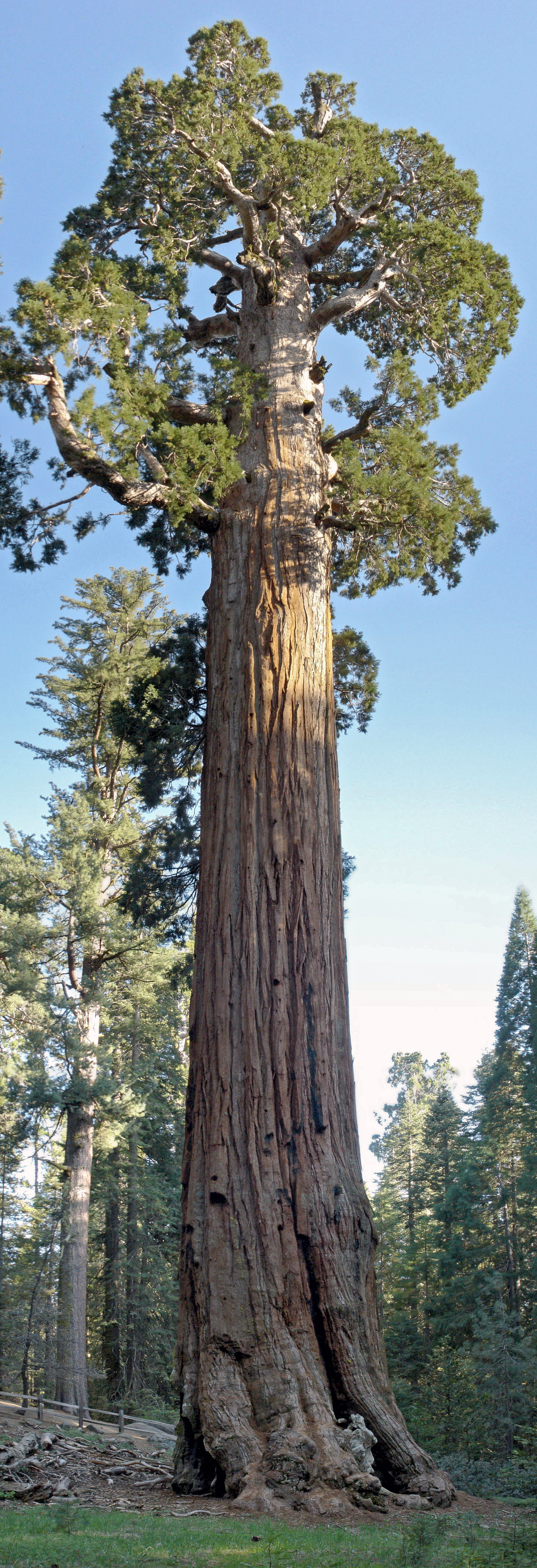
General Grant Tree, located in the General Grant Grove of giant sequoias in Kings Canyon National Park

Over 1,200 species of plants occur in Kings Canyon and Sequoia Parks, representing about 20 percent of all plant species in the state. In 1976, Kings Canyon was designated by UNESCO as part of the Sequoia-Kings Canyon Biosphere Reserve. Due to the large range in elevation, the park is characterized by several major plant communities. At lower elevations the park touches the fairly dry Sierra foothill zone which mostly consists of chaparral, brush and shrubs. Oaks, sycamores, willows and various hardwoods are often found along streams and springs at lower elevations.

At middle elevations, most of the park consists of montane mixed-conifer forests: ponderosa pine, incense cedar, white fir, sugar pine and scattered groves of giant sequoias prevail in areas such as Cedar Grove and the mid-elevation slopes around Grant Grove. In Kings Canyon, which runs almost due east to west, there is a marked difference between the north wall – which is hotter and drier due to receiving more sunlight – and the more cool, shaded south wall which is more heavily forested. Further up, approaching the subalpine zone, red fir and lodgepole pine are found in increasing numbers; whitebark pine, mountain hemlock and foxtail pine dominate in areas approaching the tree line. A total of 202,430 acres (81,920 ha) of old-growth forests are shared by Sequoia and Kings Canyon National Parks.

Although its sister park to the south, Sequoia, is better known for its giant sequoias, Kings Canyon also has large stands of sequoias – including General Grant, the second largest tree on Earth, in the middle of General Grant Grove. The Redwood Mountain Grove, located a short distance further south, is the largest surviving sequoia grove in the world, covering more than 2,500 acres (1,000 ha); it also has the tallest known sequoia, at 311 feet (95 m). The Converse Basin Grove, located just outside the park boundary, is believed to have once been more than twice as large, but was almost completely clear-cut in the late 1800s. Many of the sequoia groves destroyed by logging, such as the Big Stump Grove, have begun to regenerate, a process that will take many hundreds of years.

The forests provide habitat to many mammal species such as mule deer, Sierra Nevada bighorn sheep, mountain lions and black bears, and a diversity of bird and reptile species. The Park Service is involved in restoring the population of bighorn sheep, which are considered endangered in the area; in 2014 several bighorns were released into the Sequoia-Kings Canyon area. Grizzly bears originally roamed the park as well, but were hunted to extinction by the early 1900s. The forks of the Kings River at these middle and lower elevations are also well known for their wild trout; the Kings is known as "one of the finest large trout fisheries in the state".

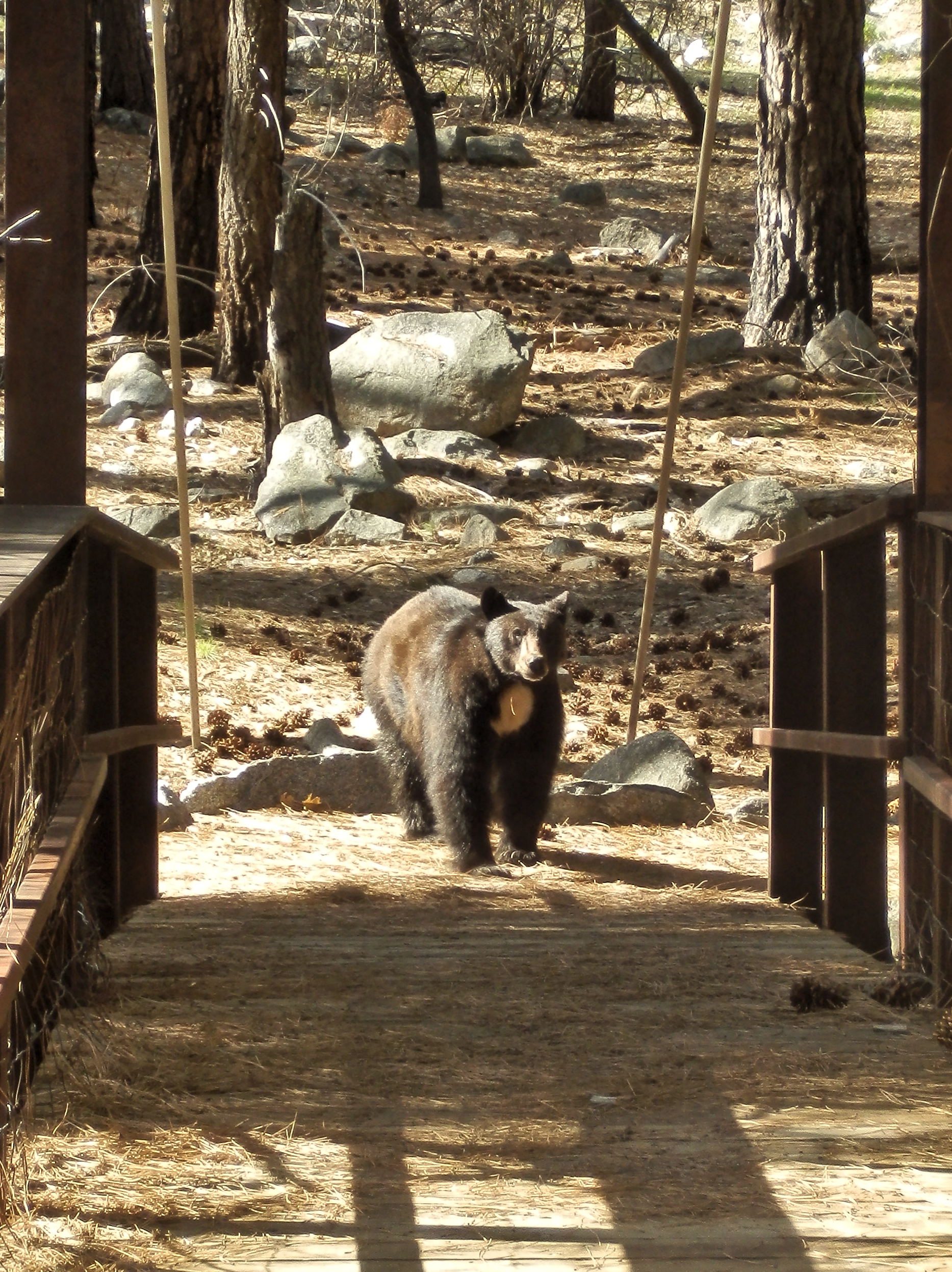
An American black bear in Kings Canyon National Park

In the high alpine country, plant communities are mostly meadows, herbs and shrubs with some scattered groves of foxtail pine and stunted whitebark pine. Trees often create krummholtz formations, or a stunted, deformed growth pattern characterized by branches closely hugging the ground. Talus slopes are home to small mammals such as pikas and yellow-bellied marmots. Birds such as gray-crowned rosy finches and American pipits, and sensitive amphibian species such as mountain yellow-legged frogs and Yosemite toads, feed on insects near alpine lakes and wetlands. Larger animals such as bears may venture into the alpine zone in search of food (a behavior now exacerbated by improper disposal of waste by campers), but do not winter there.

=== Human impacts and management ===
Although most of the park is now designated wilderness, human activities have significantly modified the ecology of the area ever since Native American times. In order to clear areas for hunting game and to encourage the germination of certain plants, Native Americans set controlled burns in areas of overgrown brush and grass. During the early 20th century, ""complete fire suppression" policy led to a great build-up of debris and tinder in the park's forests. By the 1960s it became apparent that this was interfering with the reproductive cycle of the park's sequoias, whose bark is fire resistant but require regular fires to clear away competing growth such as white firs. In 1963, scientists deliberately set fire to part of the Redwood Mountain Grove, the first fire in any of the park's sequoia groves for 75 years. Thousands of new sequoia seedlings germinated. The success of the experiment led to the establishment of the park's first long-term prescribed burn program in 1972.

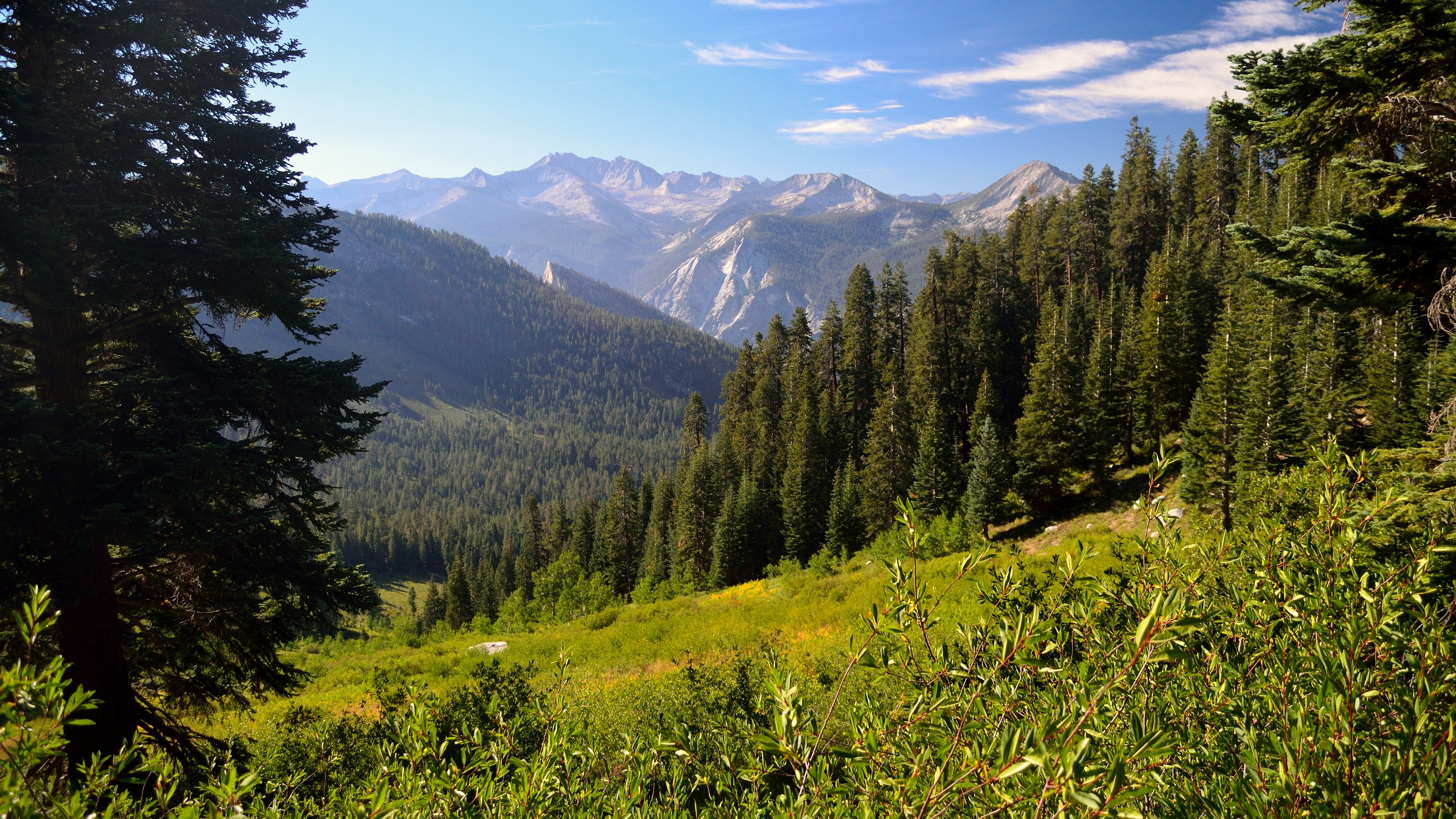
Meadow and forest habitat along the Copper Creek Trail, north side of Kings Canyon.

A major source of damage to the park in the late 19th century and early 20th century was summer livestock grazing, particularly sheep, in areas such as Tehipite Valley and the Roaring River valley (although sheep never entered Cedar Grove, due to the difficulty of accessing the bottom of Kings Canyon before Highway 180 was constructed). Ranchers drove their herds up into the Sierra Nevada to escape the drought and heat of the San Joaquin Valley. Meadows were trampled by thousands of hooves, leading to increased erosion and watershed degradation. Grizzly bears and wolves which preyed on livestock were shot, trapped and poisoned in large numbers, extirpating them from the Sierra by the early 1900s.

Although the Sierra Forest Reserve, including what would become Kings Canyon and Sequoia National Parks, was established in 1893, as many as half a million sheep were illegally grazed there. In 1917 the federal government began to crack down on illegal grazing and established a system of regulated management and range restoration, before sheep were banned from Kings Canyon altogether following the park's creation in 1940. Livestock grazing is still allowed in some national forest lands around the park. Occasionally hikers may come across gated drift fences in the wilderness designed to control livestock movement. Visitors must close all gates behind them to prevent livestock from wandering into protected areas.

The decline of natural predators in the early 1900s led to a huge spike in the deer population, which further rose due to park visitors feeding them. Ultimately, this led to overgrazing and the vegetation understory was nearly eliminated in large areas of the park. When the park was expanded in 1940, the Park Service began shooting deer in an effort to reduce the size of the herd. Although the culling reduced deer numbers to a more ecologically stable level, the program was criticized for its reliance on brute force rather than more "hands-off" methods, such as re-introducing predators. Today, the only stock allowed in the park are pack horses and mules, which are only permitted in certain areas along major trails, and usually not early in the season in order to protect meadows in the spring while they are wet and soft.

The park continues to host a healthy population of black bears, which are typically not aggressive towards humans, but have a tendency to steal human food. The Park Service has placed bear lockers in campgrounds, required the use of bear canisters and attempted to relocate bears away from heavily visited areas. This has been successful in the backcountry, where bears have largely ceased to associate backpackers with food, but remains an issue near developed campgrounds. Visitors are encouraged to store all food and scented items in lockers, and dispose of trash in bearproof garbage cans. However, rangers are still sometimes forced to kill "problem bears" who become habituated to human food.

== Human history ==
=== Indigenous peoples ===
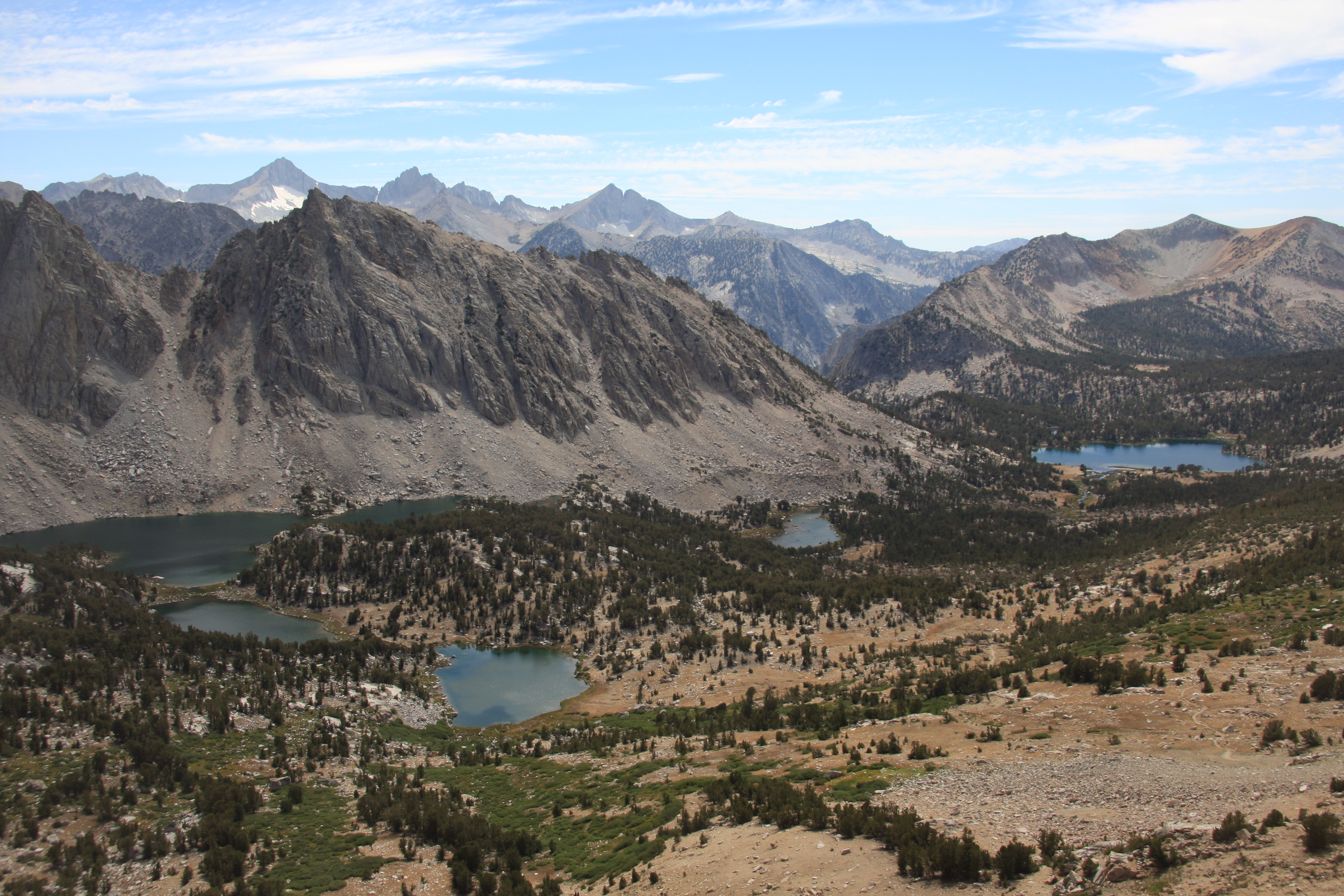
Kearsarge and Bullfrog Lakes seen from Kearsarge Pass. The pass was the main route for Paiute peoples traveling from the Owens Valley into Kings Canyon.

People have inhabited Kings Canyon National Park for about 6,000–7,000 years. The Owens Valley Paiutes (also known as the Eastern Monos) visited the region from their homeland east of the Sierra Nevada, around Mono Lake. The Paiutes mainly used acorns for food, as well as deer and other small animals. They created trade routes connecting the Owens Valley with the Central Valley west of the Sierra Nevada. The Yokuts lived in the Central Valley and also ventured into the mountains during summer to collect plants, hunt game, and trade. Because of the inhospitable winter climate, they did not establish permanent villages in the high country. Prior to European contact, the Yokut population numbered between 15,000 and 20,000, and the Monos about 6,000.

Around the 1500s AD, some of the Eastern Mono migrated across the Sierra Nevada into the Central Valley, where they created settlements adjoining Yokuts territory in the Sierra foothills near the Kings River. This group became known as the Monaches, or Western Mono. They eventually divided into as many as six distinct bands, one of which lived in the area near Grant Grove. The native population suffered greatly during the American expansion in the 19th century; a smallpox epidemic killed off most of the Monache in 1862, and very few remain in the area today.

=== Buffalo Soldiers ===
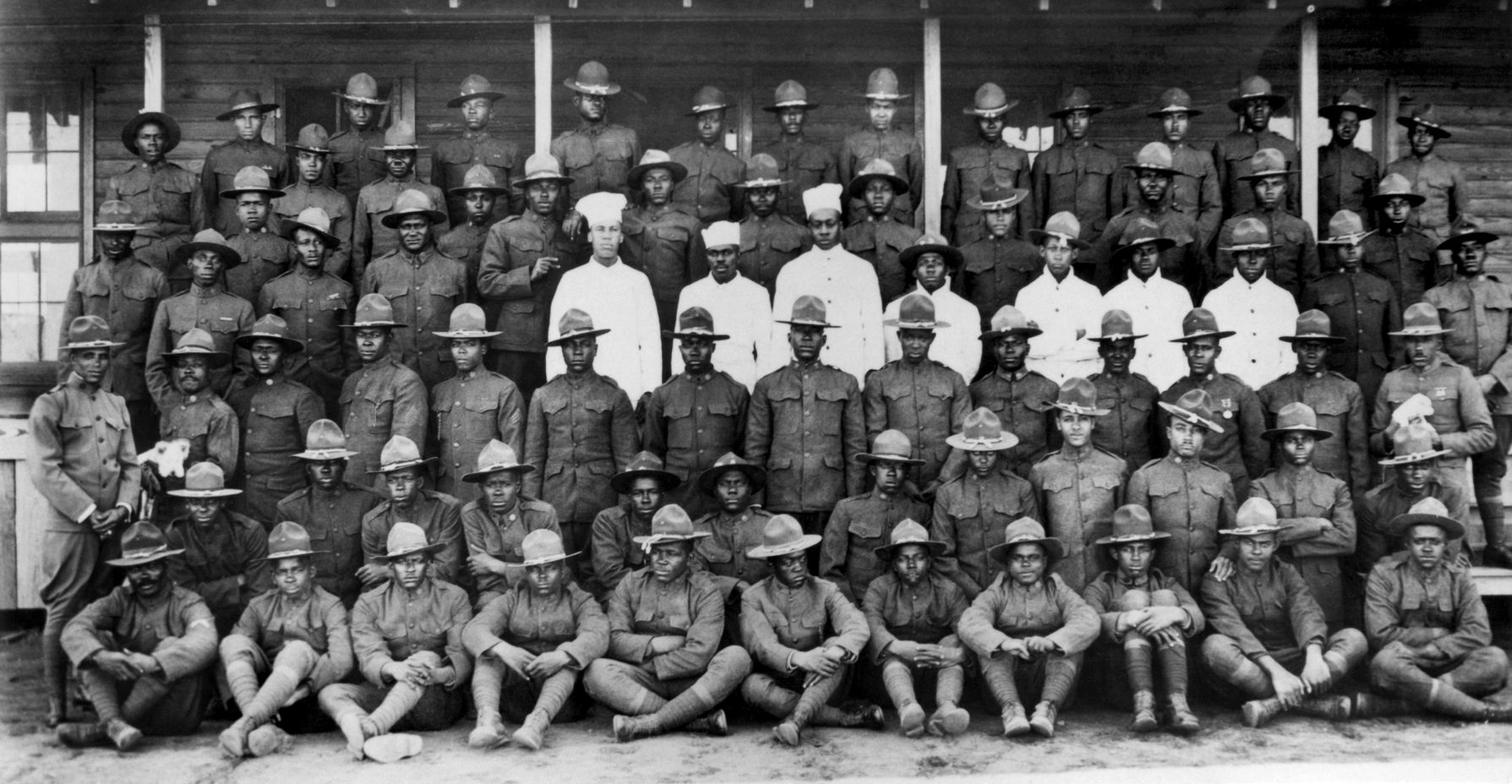
The 9th Cavalry Regiment (1866–1944) of Buffalo Soldiers

The Buffalo Soldiers were African American soldiers in the U.S. Army that was formed in 1866 after the end of the Civil War. Much of their work was in remote areas and highly dangerous. Buffalo Soldiers were stationed in the American frontier protecting settlers, building infrastructure and working in some of the countries first national parks such as Yosemite and Sequoia. The 9th Cavalry of Buffalo Soldiers were stationed in Kings Canyon National Park. Their work here included building, roads, trails, and protecting the park. In many ways, they acted as park rangers before the National Park Service was formed. Many of King Canyons popular sites, trails and tourist attractions were made possible by the Buffalo Soldiers. Led by superintendent Charles Young, the Buffalo soldiers created the first road that led into the forest. They also created the first trail to the top of Mt. Whitney, which is the tallest mountain peak in the lower 48 states.

=== Early exploration and logging ===
The early Spanish exploration of California largely bypassed what is now Kings Canyon National Park. In 1805 Gabriel Moraga led an expedition through the Central Valley and crossed what is now the Kings River, bestowing the name Rio de los Santo Reyes (River of the Holy Kings) on the stream. Fur trappers also visited the areas in the 1820s, but most likely did not venture into the high country since beaver were only present at lower elevations. They were followed by prospectors during the California Gold Rush, which began in 1848. However, not much gold, nor other minerals, were discovered in this area. Hale Tharp, a disillusioned gold miner, is credited with the 1858 discovery of Giant Forest in Sequoia National Park, which led to the further exploration and discovery of the other sequoia forests in the area, including Grant Grove.

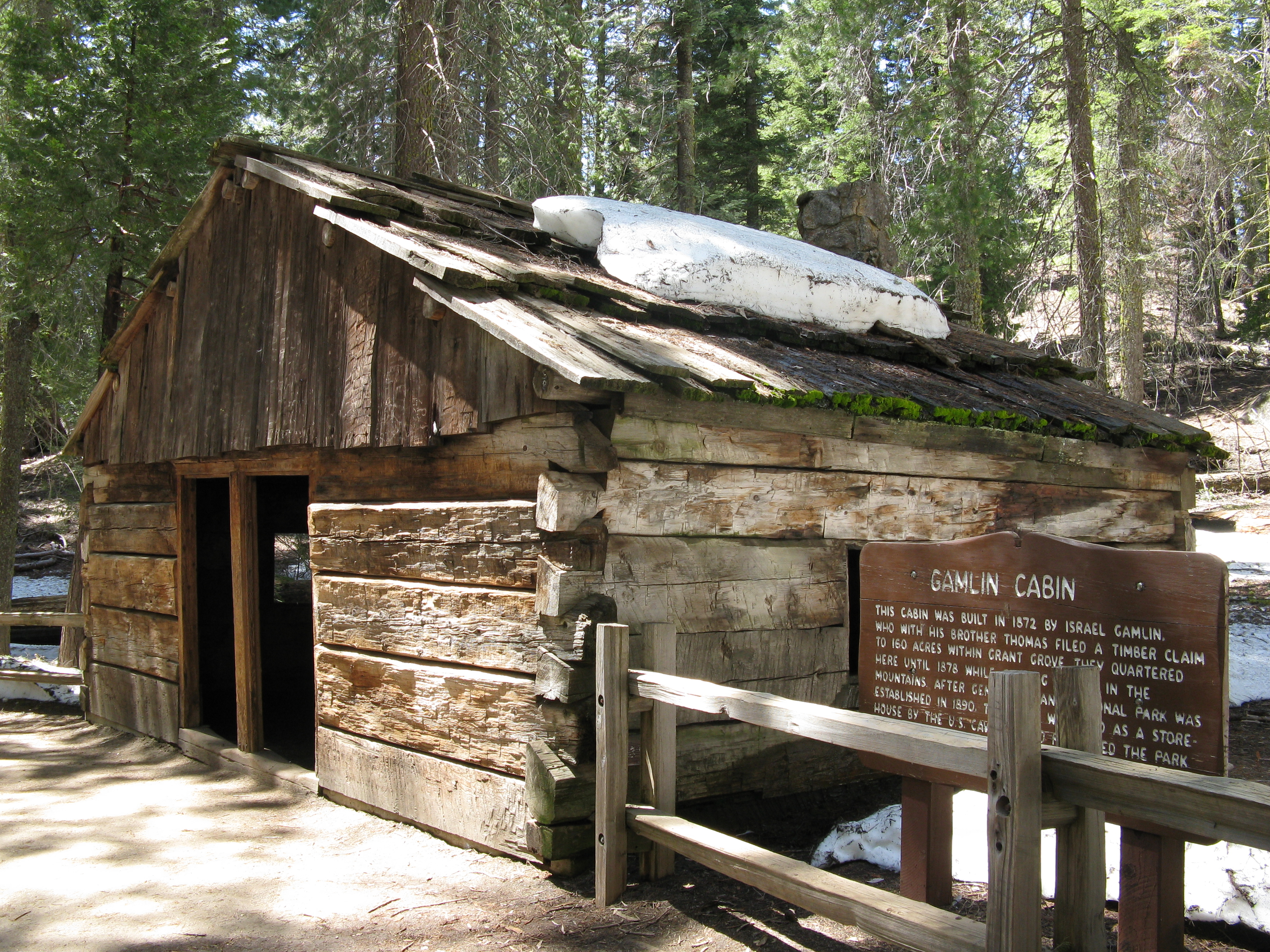
Gamlin Cabin, built by loggers in 1872, is the oldest surviving structure in Kings Canyon National Park.

During the 1860s, a road was built to Grant Grove and many of the sequoias there were logged. The first of several sawmills opened in 1862, and logging operations expanded north and almost entirely leveled Converse Basin, then one of the largest sequoia groves in the world (although the Boole tree, the grove's biggest, was spared). The General Grant tree was discovered by Joseph H. Thomas, a sawmill operator, in 1862. Thomas' business partners, the Gamlin brothers, held a claim to the land surrounding Grant Grove, and their dwelling (built around 1872) has been preserved as a historic site.

During the 1870s a government survey "disclosed the remarkable quality of General Grant Grove, and Israel Gamlin was persuaded to give up his claim so the area could be preserved." However, this did not entirely stop logging in the area – in 1875 a 300-foot (91 m) sequoia was chopped down and a section sent to the Philadelphia Centennial Exposition of 1876. Reportedly, "eastern people refused to accept the exhibit as part of a single tree and called it the 'California Hoax'." The Centennial Stump, and most of the tree, remain as prominent features in Grant Grove: "Ladies from a nearby logging camp used to conduct Sunday school services for their children upon the stump."

=== Wilderness surveys ===
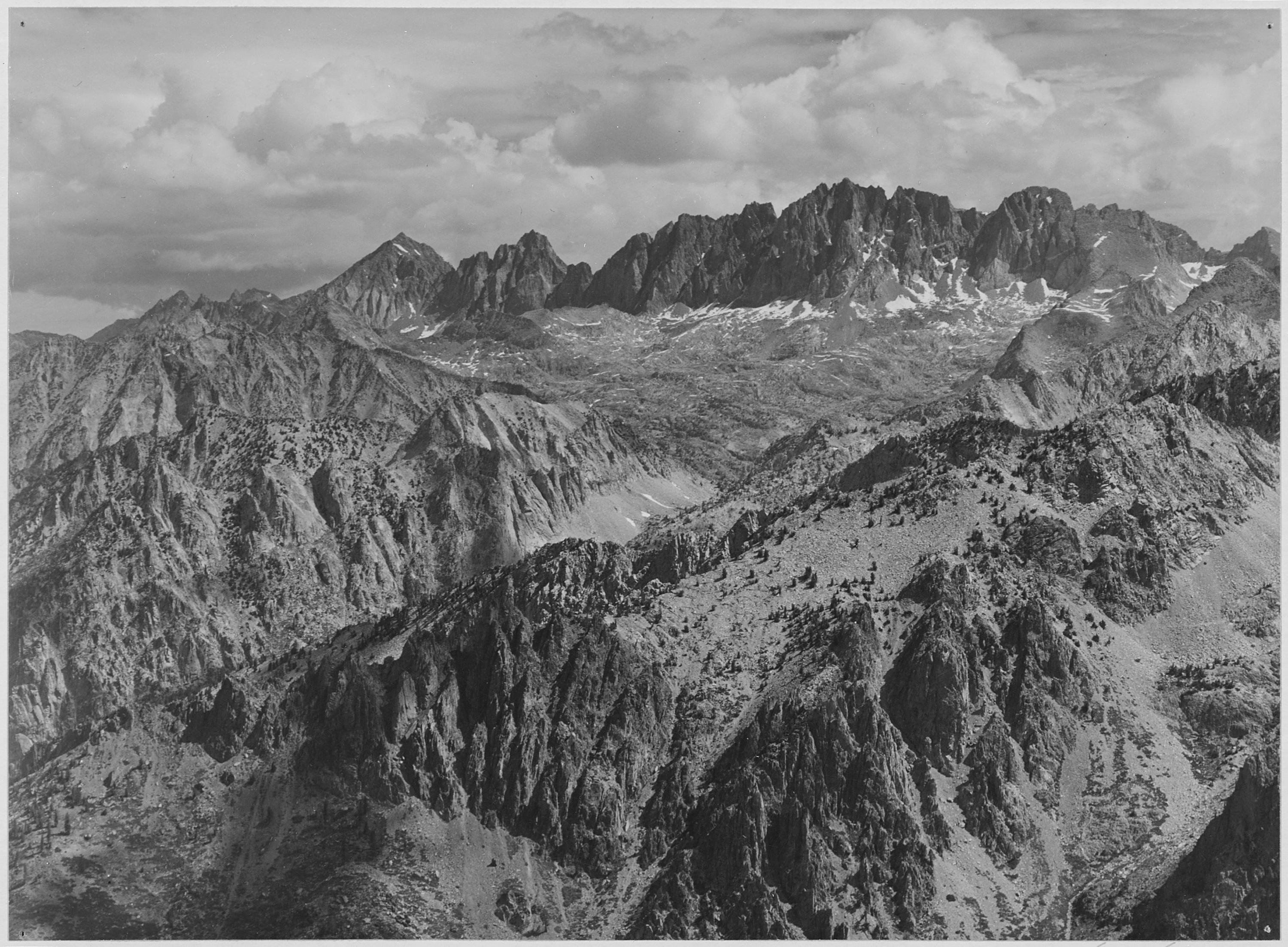
North Palisade from Windy Point, photographed by Ansel Adams, ca. 1936.

The first scientific expedition to the area was the 1864 Whitney Survey, conducted by the Geological Survey of California led by William Brewer. After failed attempts to summit Mount Whitney, the Brewer party descended into the Kings Canyon via Native American paths where "they remarked its resemblance to the Yosemite and were impressed by the enormous height of its cliffs." Although the rugged terrain made travel difficult, they discovered a route up the north wall of the canyon and named several prominent features, including Mount King, Mount Gardiner, the Palisades, and Mount Brewer. From the summit of the peak that would bear his name, Brewer described the view:

Such a landscape! A hundred peaks in sight over thirteen thousand feet—many very sharp—deep canyons, cliffs in every direction almost rival Yosemite, sharp ridges inaccessible to man, on which human foot has never trod—all combined to produce a view of sublimity of which is rarely equaled, one which few are privileged to behold.

Brewer's party left Kings Canyon via Kearsarge Pass where they encountered a group of prospectors led by Thomas Keough. Although details on the Keough expedition are scarce, the miners had been prospecting on the North Fork of the Kings River and were returning to their homes in the Owens Valley, indicating that they must have crossed the Middle Fork – then considered a region impossible to access by white settlers – making them the first non-natives to do so. Around 1869, sheepherder Frank Dusy discovered and named the Middle Fork's Tehipite Valley, and later grazed his sheep there. Aside from such occasional uses, most of the high country remained little visited and mostly unexplored.

=== Park creation ===
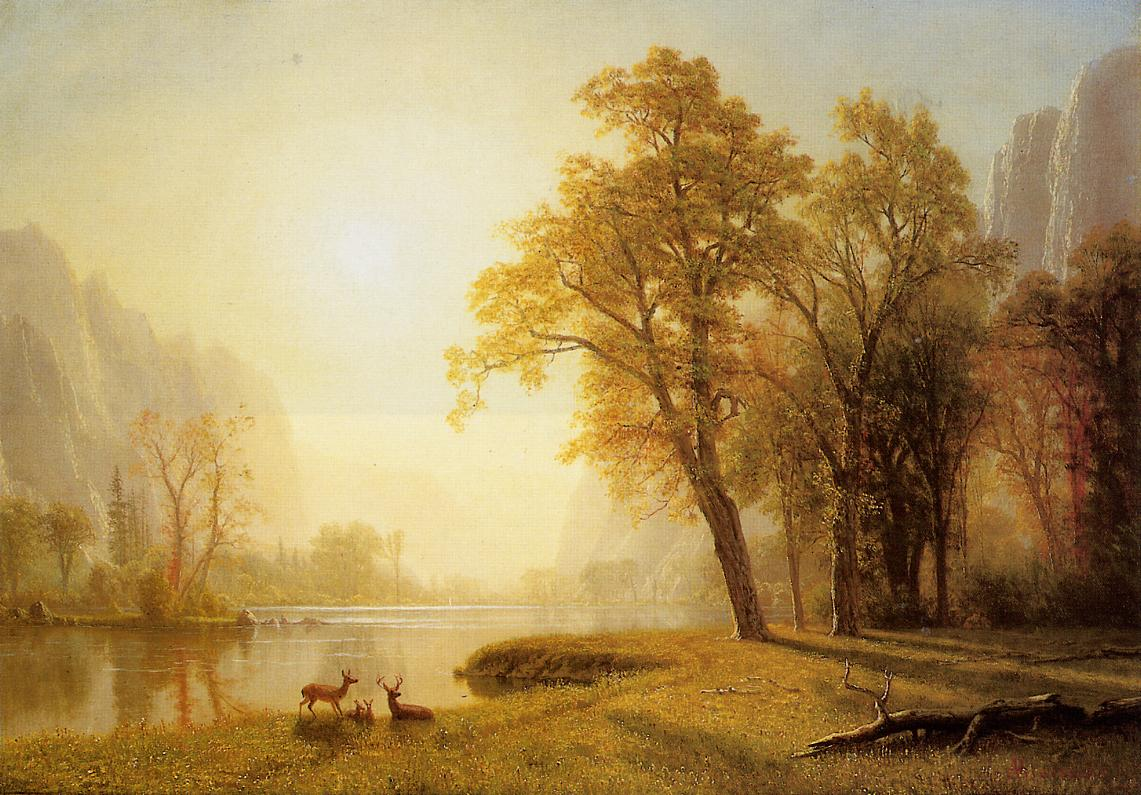
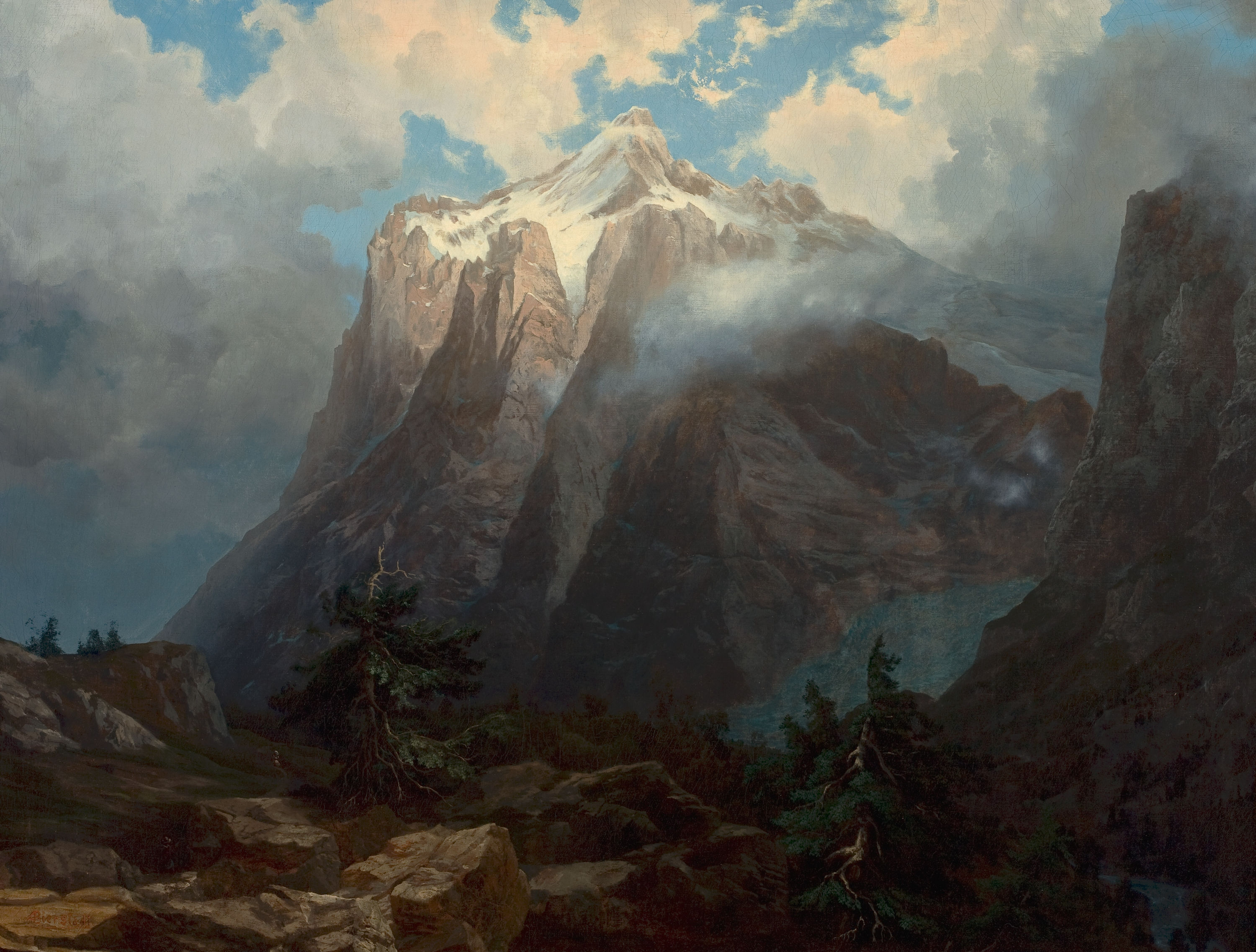
Paintings of Kings Canyon by Albert Bierstadt, early California landscape artist. Left: Kings River Canyon, California (ca. 1870) Right: Mount Brewer from King's River Canyon, California (1872)

It was not until John Muir first visited in 1873 that Kings Canyon began receiving public attention. Muir was delighted at the canyon's similarity to Yosemite Valley, as it reinforced his theory that the valleys were carved by massive glaciers during the last ice age. This competed with Josiah Whitney's then-accepted theory that the mountain valleys were formed by earthquakes. Muir's writings on the geology of the park and the magnificence of its sequoia groves led to calls for preservation of the area, and Muir himself continued to lobby for the cause. In 1880 logging claims in the Grant Grove area were suspended by the federal government, in large part due to the political efforts of Colonel George W. Stewart.

In March 1890 a bill (H.R. 8350) was introduced to Congress by Representative William Vandever proposing the creation of Yosemite National Park. Subsequently, some "political intrigue" led to its substitution with H.R. 12187, which also included provisions for a General Grant National Park and the expansion of Sequoia National Park. The origins of this bill remain largely a mystery, although local politicians with an interest in preserving the park were likely involved. Daniel K. Zumwalt, an agent for the Southern Pacific Railroad – which owned many lumber interests in California – may have seen the park as a way to force their competitors in the Sequoia-Kings Canyon area out of business. On October 1, 1890, President Benjamin Harrison signed the bill into law, establishing General Grant National Park – the United States' fourth national park – which today is part of the smaller western section of Kings Canyon National Park.

For many years the primary way for tourists to reach General Grant National Park was the Stephens Grade, a rough wagon road over which a stagecoach operated from Visalia beginning in the early 1900s. Initially, the U.S. Army had to station troops to protect the park from illegal grazing and hunting. Although these eventually ceased to be a problem, the rising number of visitors created its own sanitation and waste issues. In the summer of 1907 about 1,100 people visited the park. A new road reached the General Grant National Park by 1913; that summer, the park saw almost 2,800 tourists. In 1914 the park was turned over from military to civilian control (though the National Park Service was not formally established until 1916).

=== Park expansion and dam controversy ===
The future of the park's much larger eastern section remained in doubt for almost fifty years. The backcountry was largely inaccessible and unknown to tourists, requiring several days' journey on horseback through some very rugged terrain. Instead, the area was targeted by water supply and power interests including the city of Los Angeles, who wanted to build hydroelectric dams in Kings Canyon. Due to its heavy flow and long drop – 11,000 feet (3,400 m) in less than 80 miles (130 km) – the Kings River has considerable hydroelectric potential, and reservoirs were proposed for Cedar Grove, Tehipite Valley and Simpson Meadow, among other sites. Development interests blocked legislation that would have made the area a national park, but at the same time, the environmental lobby prevented any of these projects from being built.

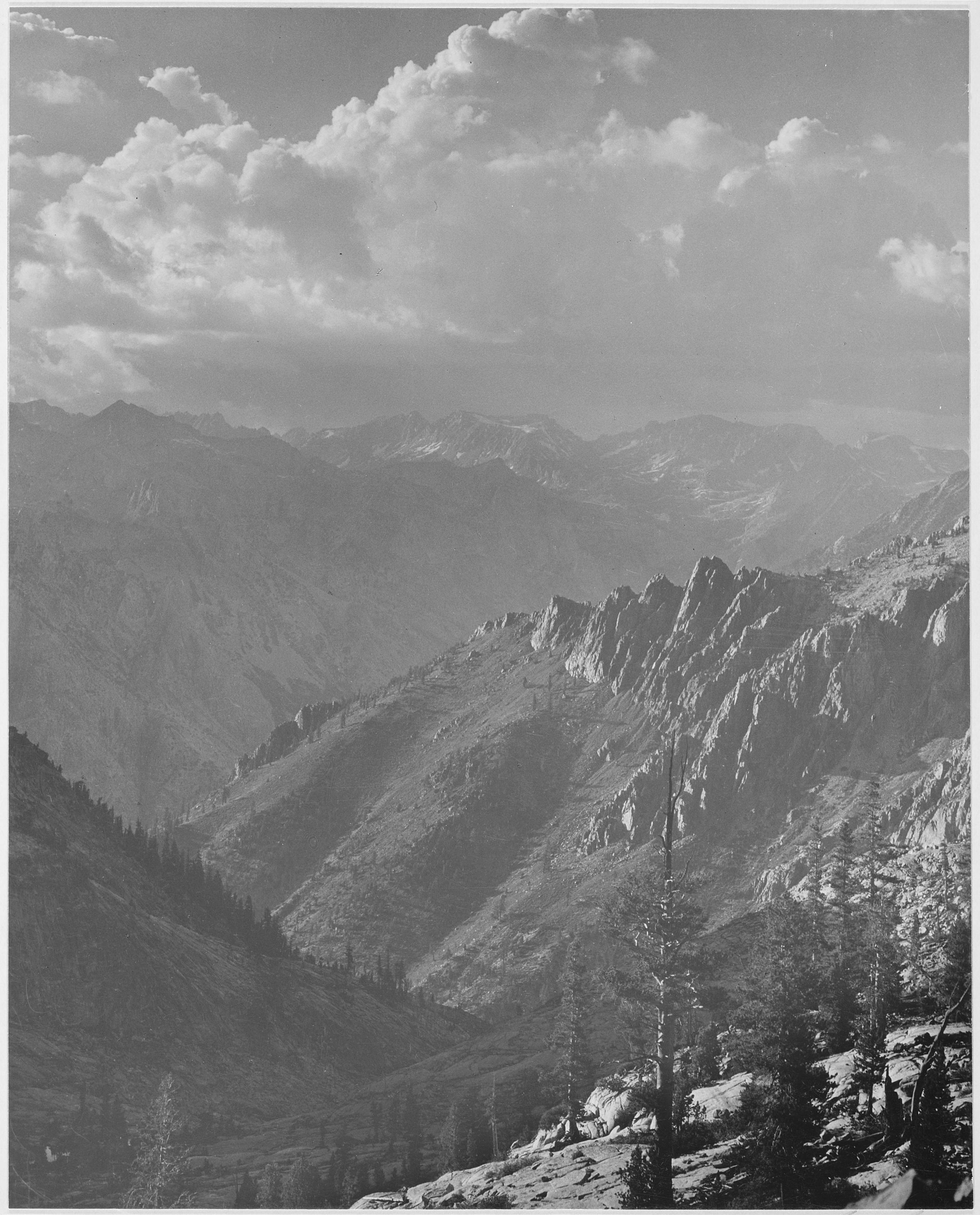
Middle Fork at Kings River from South Fork of Cartridge Creek, Kings River Canyon, photographed by Ansel Adams, 1936

In 1935 the Generals Highway was completed connecting Sequoia and General Grant National Parks. In 1939 State Route 180 from Grant Grove to Kings Canyon was finally completed after ten years of construction, finally allowing large numbers of tourists to visit Cedar Grove for the first time. The road was built in part using state prison labor. However, a proposal to extend the state highway over Kearsarge Pass to the Owens Valley was defeated.

Well-graded hiking trails were also extended into the backcountry to replace the rough pack trails used by sheepherders – including the John Muir Trail, completed in 1933 through what is now the eastern edge of Kings Canyon National Park. For many years a tiny ranger station and a few private structures (such as Knapp Cabin) had been the only development in Cedar Grove. Starting in 1937, large campgrounds were developed in Kings Canyon by the U.S. Forest Service, but construction of more permanent facilities was foregone since the area would lie at the bottom of one of the proposed reservoirs.

Ultimately, local opposition to Los Angeles' attempts to secure the Kings River turned into significant political pressure to create a national park, which would prevent any dam projects there. United States Secretary of the Interior Harold Ickes was a major proponent for the expansion of the park, and worked to unite local interests, who had widely different views on how much development should be allowed. Ickes also hired Ansel Adams to photograph and document the area, generating publicity for the preservation movement. However, in order to placate the local irrigation districts – who wanted to leave open the option of reservoirs – Cedar Grove and Tehipite Valley were specifically excluded from the new park. On March 4, 1940, President Franklin D. Roosevelt signed the bill to create Kings Canyon National Park, which added the original General Grant National Park to over 400,000 acres (160,000 ha) of the High Sierra above Cedar Grove.

=== Later history and additions ===
The new Kings Canyon administration initially struggled to manage the huge park, which was more than 700 times the size of the original unit at Grant Grove. In the early years staff and expertise were often loaned from Sequoia National Park. In 1943 the administrations of Kings Canyon and Sequoia National Parks were combined, as a cost-saving measure due to World War II. After the war, the arrangement was preserved; today, the two parks are still managed as one. Postwar, visitation jumped enormously, from just over 82,000 in 1945 to 450,000 in 1951. Demand increased for tourist facilities at Cedar Grove, the terminus of the state highway – although the valley was not officially part of the park, having been omitted due to water-development interests. The extension of the road through the valley was controversial, due to potential ecological damage. By 1947 the Park Service had drafted a general plan including tourist lodges, concessions and a pack station.

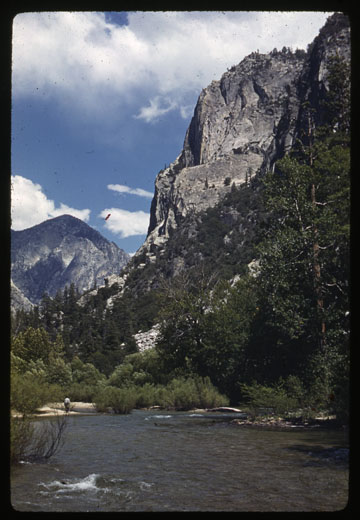
A view of the Kings River at Zumwalt Meadow in 1940, the same year most of Kings Canyon became a national park. This area would have been flooded by the proposed Cedar Grove Dam.

Then in 1948, Los Angeles unexpectedly re-filed its application to construct dams in Kings Canyon. The Kings River Conservation District (KRCD), representing local water agencies, immediately filed claims on the same sites. KRCD had no intention of constructing dams but hoped to block the possible threat to its water supply. Although the Federal Power Commission rejected Los Angeles' application, as it had prior to 1940, the city repeatedly refiled until 1963, when it was denied by both the California State Water Board and the federal government.

One factor in the project's final failure was that even though the Cedar Grove dam site was outside the park, the project required two additional dams to be built upstream if it were to be economically feasible. However, those sites were now inside the park boundary as designated in 1940. On August 6, 1965, Cedar Grove and Tehipite Valley were finally added to the park, making them permanently off-limits to new dams as well. These annexations (with the exception of a tiny section in 1984, south of Grant Grove) brought Kings Canyon National Park to its present size.

Starting in the 1950s, in response to growing traffic and crowding at national parks, the Park Service implemented Mission 66 which proposed large new visitor developments for Kings Canyon and other parks. This included new visitor centers at Grant Grove and Cedar Grove, electrification and sewage facilities at Cedar Grove, and substantial new accommodations, trails, and parking areas.

After the Cedar Grove development was delayed by the final years of the dam debacle, the Park Service released a new plan in 1972, which included cabins for 260 people, and an 11,000-square-foot (1,000 m^{2}) store and cafeteria complex, hoping to develop the area in a way similar to Yosemite Valley. In 1974 the park saw 1,216,800 visitors, a number that has not been exceeded since. However, by 1975 public hearings showed such an opposition to intense development, that ultimately only a small lodge and store were added to the canyon.

The rising number of visitors to the backcountry – from 8,000 in 1962 to over 44,000 in 1971 – created its own problems in the form of litter, illegal campfires and contact with dangerous wildlife such as bears. In 1966 and 1971 the Park Service proposed, controversially, to designate most of the park as wilderness, which would place much greater restrictions on its use. In 1973 the number of backpackers was first restricted via a quota system. Finally, on September 28, 1984, Congress designated over 85 percent of Kings Canyon and Sequoia National Parks as wilderness. In 1987, the Middle and South Forks of the Kings River were designated Wild and Scenic.

== Recreation ==
Annual visitation
Year	Pop.	±%
1910	1,178	—
1920	19,661	+1569.0%
1930	43,547	+121.5%
1940	201,545	+362.8%
1950	337,840	+67.6%
1960	759,800	+124.9%
1970	1,019,000	+34.1%
1974*	1,216,800	+19.4%
1980	819,065	−32.7%
1990	1,062,867	+29.8%
2000	528,987	−50.2%
2010	598,205	+13.1%
2016	607,479	+1.6%
Source: *Note: Year of record visitation.

Grant Grove, the only vehicular entrance to the park, is 60 miles (97 km) east of Fresno via Highway 180. In addition to Highway 180 from the west, Highway 198, the Generals Highway, provides access from Sequoia National Park in the south. The roads converge in Grant Grove Village, from where Highway 180 continues another 35 miles (56 km) northeast to Cedar Grove. There is no vehicular access from Highway 395 on the eastern side of the park. There is currently no public transportation to Kings Canyon National Park; the Big Trees Shuttle, which originally operated between Sequoia National Park and Grant Grove, is no longer in service.

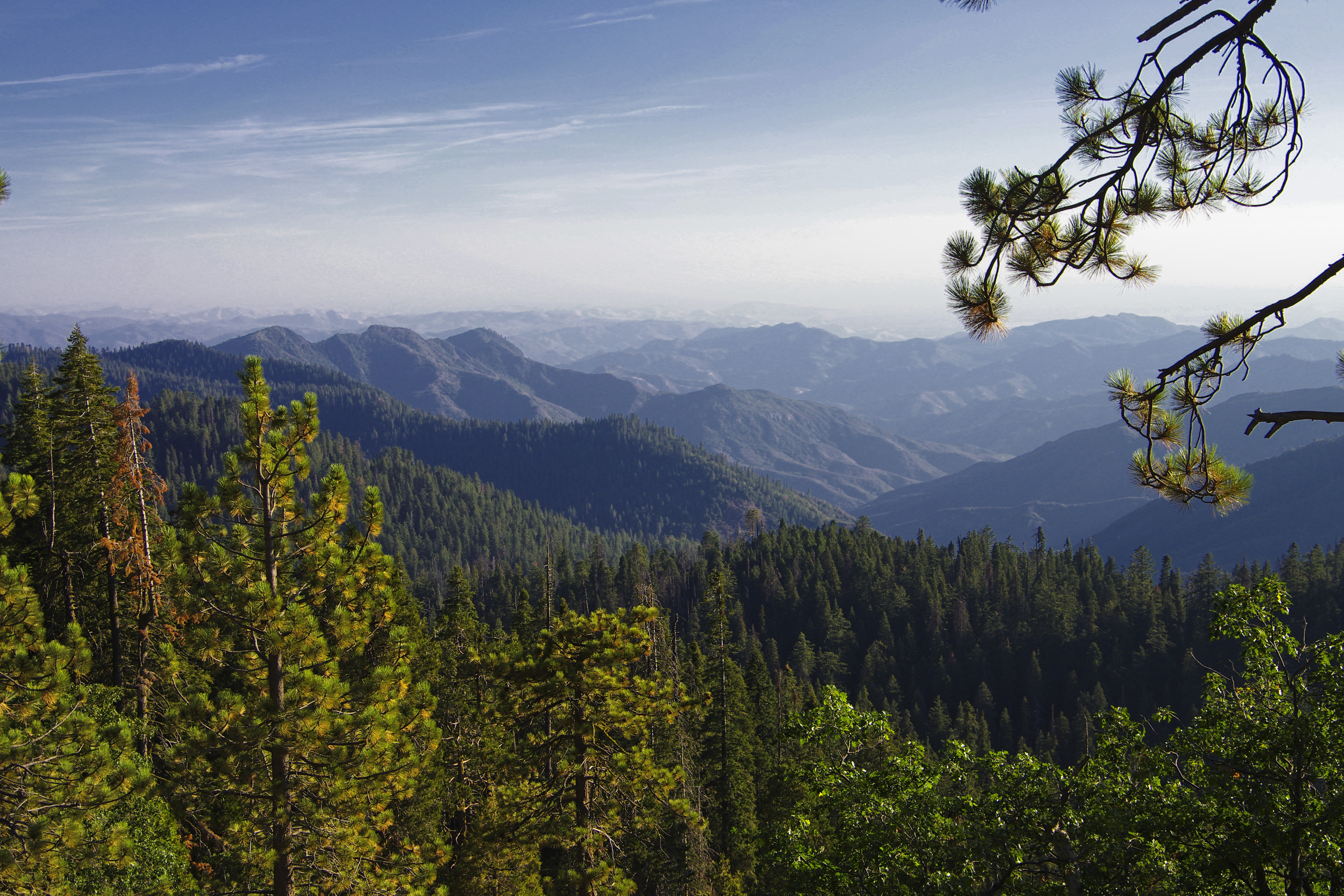
A forested area of Kings Canyon National Park near Grant Grove, the original park established in 1890.

The National Park Service maintains visitor centers at Grant Grove and Cedar Grove. Grant Grove Village is the most developed part of the park and includes the 36-room John Muir Lodge (the park's largest hotel), visitor cabins, a restaurant and a general store. Cedar Grove also has a small market, but overall the facilities there are much more limited. Barring extreme weather, the Grant Grove section is open year-round; Cedar Grove is closed in winter. Highway 180 is plowed only as far as Princess Meadow, the junction with the Hume Lake Road, which remains open to Hume Lake in winter.

Due to its limited road access, Kings Canyon receives many fewer visitors than its neighboring national parks, Sequoia and Yosemite. The overall decline in national park visitation in the late 1990s hit Kings Canyon considerably harder than the other parks; from 1970 to 1990 it averaged almost a million visitors per year, but in the 21st century, it has averaged just 560,000. In 2016, it saw an increase to 607,479 visitors, which (with the exception of 2009) was the highest count since 1995. Since records began in 1904, an approximate total of 53 million people have visited Kings Canyon.

=== Campgrounds and hiking ===
In Grant Grove, the three major campgrounds are Azalea, Crystal Springs and Sunset, with 319 sites in total. With the exception of Sunset, they operate on a first-come, first-served basis. Cedar Grove has 314 sites in the Sentinel, Sheep Creek and Moraine Campgrounds, which are also first-come, first-served; sites at the Canyon View group camp must be reserved. During high demand periods, additional campsites may be placed on a reservation system. All campgrounds have flush toilets and showers, although water use may be restricted depending on the season.

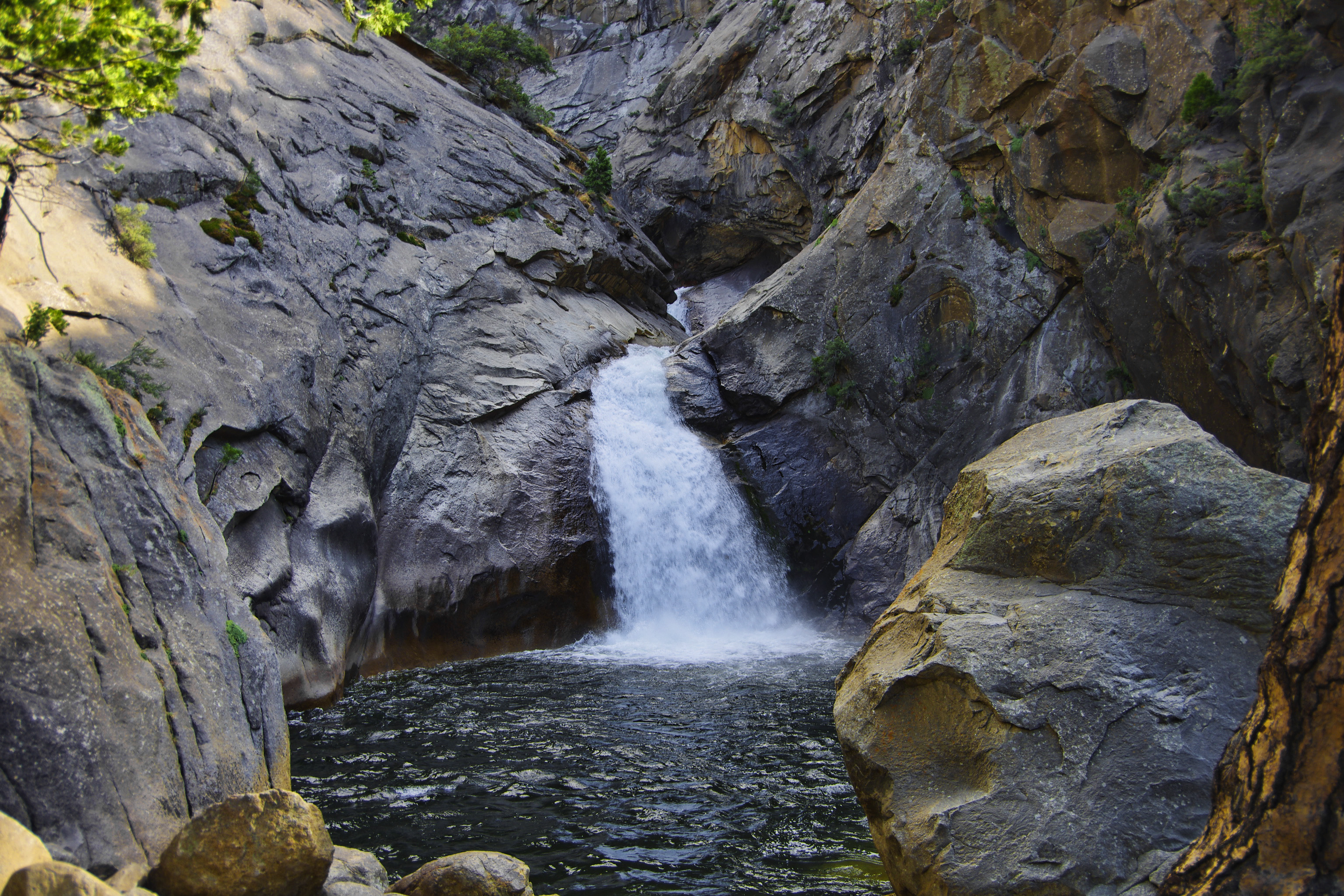
Roaring River Falls, 40 feet (12 m) high, is easily accessed via a short hike in Cedar Grove.

There are a number of day hikes in the parts of Kings Canyon National Park accessible by road. In the Grant Grove area a one-mile (1.6 km) trail leads to the General Grant Tree, and several longer trails reach nearby points of interest such as Redwood Mountain, the largest sequoia grove. In Cedar Grove, easy hikes include the boardwalk path through Zumwalt Meadow – providing broad views of Kings Canyon – and the short walk to Roaring River Falls; there are also many longer day hikes such as an 8-mile (13 km) round trip to Mist Falls, and the 13-mile (21 km) round trip climb to Lookout Peak above Kings Canyon.

A number of historical sites in the park are easily accessible via short walks, including Gamlin Cabin, built c. 1872 by the Gamlin brothers, who had a timber claim at Grant Grove before it became a national park. it is believed to be the first permanent structure built in the park area. Knapp Cabin, listed on the National Register of Historic Places, is the oldest surviving structure in Cedar Grove, dating back to 1925. Another point of interest is the extensive Boyden Cavern system whose entrance is located just outside the park's western boundary, in the Monarch Wilderness. The cave was temporarily closed from 2015 until 2019 due to damage from the Rough Fire.

=== Backcountry travel ===
Since most of Kings Canyon is wilderness and roads extend only a small distance into the park, backpacking (and less commonly, horsepacking) are the only way to see the majority of the park. Unlike day hikers, overnight backpackers must obtain a wilderness permit from a ranger station or visitor center. During the peak tourist season (typically between May and September), a quota applies for wilderness permits, of which 75 percent are set aside for prior reservations, with the remainder for walk-ins. Outside the quota period permits are still required, although the limit no longer applies. Although backpackers account for a relatively small percentage of the total visitors, some of the backcountry trails are still quite heavily used. Due to the popularity of some backcountry camps, stays can be limited to one or two nights. During the summer, the Park Service staffs backcountry ranger stations at McClure Meadow, Le Conte Meadow, Rae Lakes, Charlotte Lake and Roaring River.

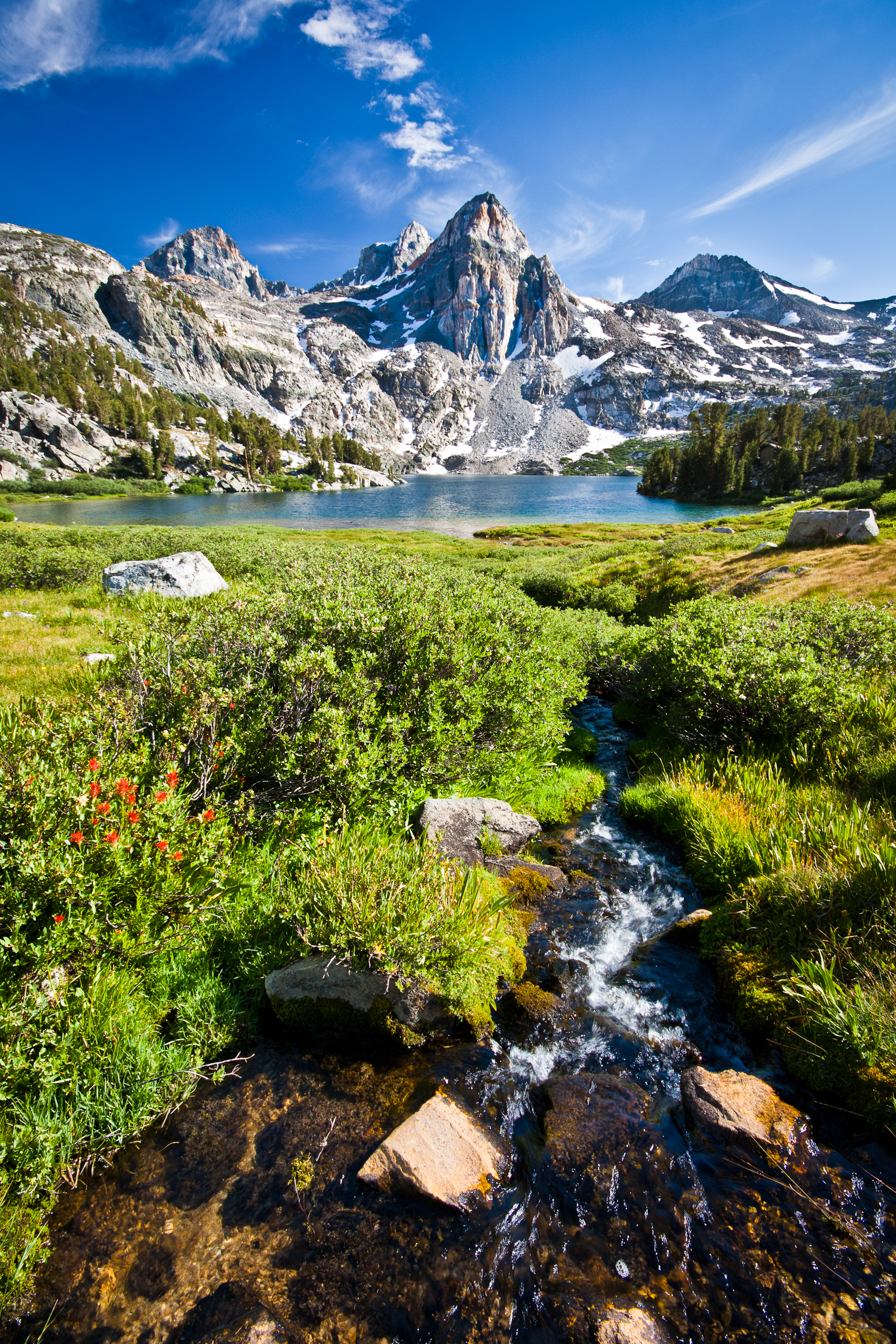
Rae Lakes (Middle Rae Lake shown) is one of several backpacking destinations in the park.

Road's End at Cedar Grove is a major jumping-off point for trips into the backcountry. The Rae Lakes Loop, 41.4 miles (66.6 km), is one of the most popular backpacking trips and passes through the deep canyons of Paradise Valley, the high Woods Creek suspension bridge and exposed alpine country before reaching Rae Lakes, a chain of glacial tarns set below 13,000-foot (4,000 m) peaks. Rae Lakes Loop hikers also climb over Glen Pass reaching a peak elevation of just under 12,000 feet. From the top of the pass, hikers can see views of Rae Lakes and the surrounding basin. The combined Pacific Crest Trail/John Muir Trail forms the backbone of the trail system, winding about 77 miles (124 km) from Piute Canyon at the park's northern tip to Forester Pass, 13,153 ft (4,009 m), in the south. Many hikes in Kings Canyon, including Rae Lakes, include parts of the PCT/JMT. There are also trailheads at Grant Grove which lead to more moderate hikes in the lower western Sierra Nevada, many in the Jennie Lakes Wilderness (just outside the national park).

Many parts of the park, such as the Middle Fork of the Kings River, are more difficult to access, requiring multi-day hikes over difficult terrain. Simpson Meadow on the Middle Fork is a 23-mile (37 km), one-way hike from Cedar Grove, with well over 12,000 feet (3,700 m) of elevation change. Other trailheads outside the park provide access to some of its more isolated locations, such as Tehipite Valley, a 14-mile (23 km) one-way hike from the Wishon Dam trailhead in the Sierra National Forest. The 3,000-foot (910 m) exposed and unmaintained descent into the valley is "notorious" as one of the park's most difficult hikes. Several trails also access the park from the Owens Valley to the east; all surmount passes more than 11,000 feet (3,400 m) high. The closest and most heavily used eastern approach is via Onion Valley Road, which terminates about a mile (1.6 km) east of the park boundary in the Inyo National Forest. The Kearsarge Pass Trail begins at Onion Valley Campground and links to the PCT/JMT via the eponymous pass.

During the spring and early summer, river crossings can be hazardous; in response the Park Service has installed bridges along some of the major trails. By late August or September of most years, rivers will have dropped to relatively safe levels. The high country is typically snow free between May and November, although in particularly wet years, large areas of snow may persist into July. In winter, cross-country skiing and snowshoeing are common activities. The Park Service provides ranger-led snowshoe walks and maintains some groomed trails in the Grant Grove area. Longer trips into the backcountry are also possible, although due to the rough terrain, typically deep snows and lack of ranger patrols during the winter, this is recommended only for skilled winter travelers. As with backpacking, wilderness permits are required for any overnight trips in winter.

=== Climbing and canyoneering ===
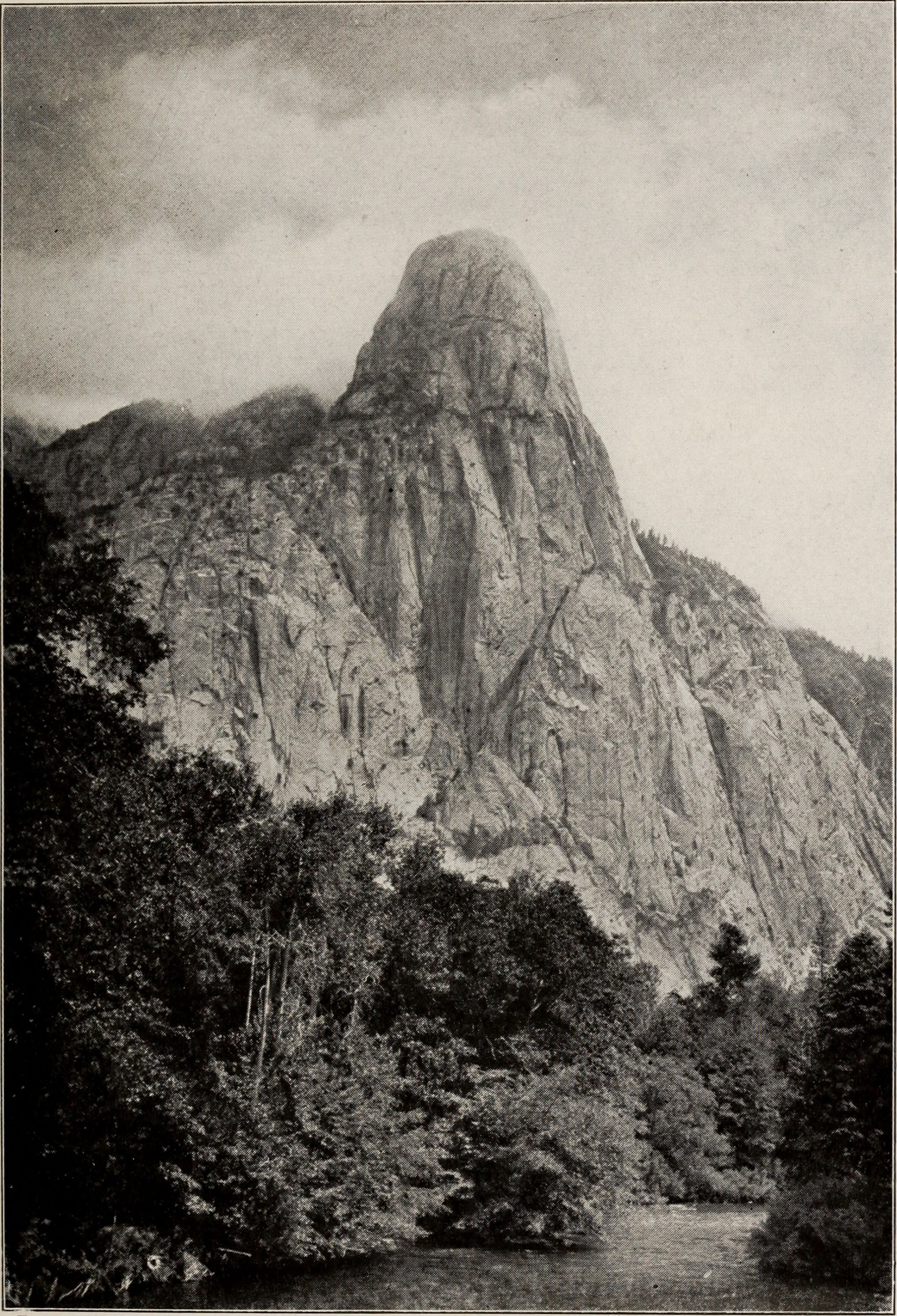
Tehipite Dome, in the Kings Canyon backcountry, has various climbing routes ranging from grade II–VI.

The large, exposed granite cliffs and domes in Kings Canyon provide opportunities for rock climbing. However, many such features require long or circuitous hikes to reach their bases, which deters many climbers. These include The Obelisk, overlooking Kings Canyon at the park's western boundary, multipitch climbs at Charlito Dome and Charlotte Dome well up the Bubbs Creek Trail, and Tehipite Dome, which requires a nearly 30-mile (48 km) roundtrip hike just to access. Many of the park's prominent peaks also require technical climbing – including North Palisade, the highest point in the park, and some of its neighbors along the Sierra crest. In The High Sierra: Peaks, Passes, Trails (2009) North Palisade is described as "the classic peak of the High Sierra ... It is striking from a distance and has routes that will challenge climbers of all abilities and preferences."

Canyoneering, bouldering, bushwhacking and rappelling are often necessary to explore parts of the backcountry without developed trails. A notably challenging route is down Enchanted Gorge in the Middle Fork backcountry, where Disappearing Creek vanishes under huge talus piles only to re-emerge several miles downstream, hence the name. Nearby Goddard Canyon is an easier – albeit still rugged – route, and is known for its scenic meadows and many waterfalls. The Gorge of Despair above Tehipite Valley is known for its combination of cliffs, waterfalls and deep pools, whose 3,000-foot (910 m) descent requires rappelling gear and wetsuits to achieve. Because of the park's size, lack of cell reception and limited personnel for search and rescue operations, only experienced cross-country travelers should attempt to hike off trail.

=== Water sports ===
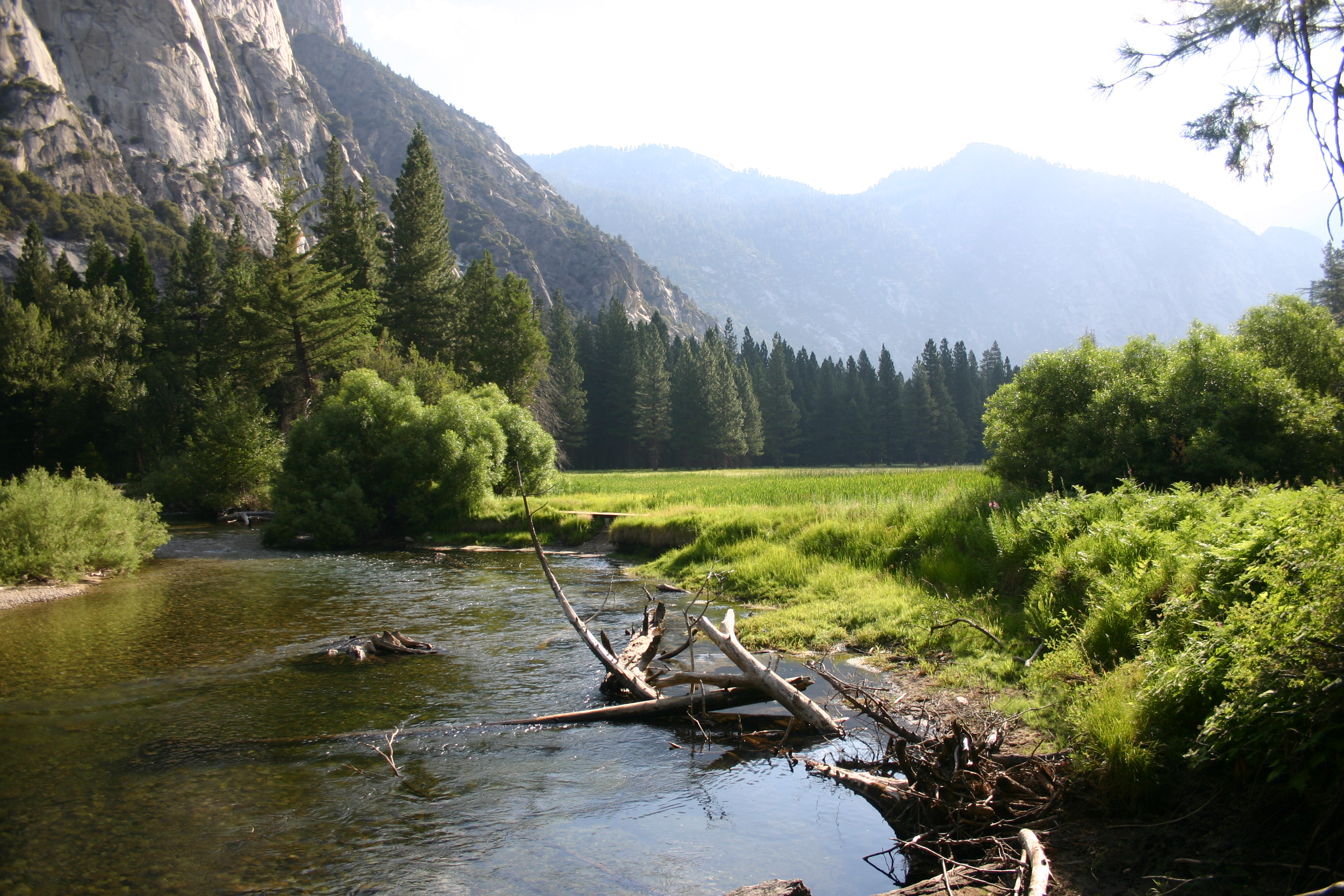
Section of the South Fork in Cedar Grove

In Cedar Grove, about 10 miles (16 km) of the South Fork are considered good waters for fly fishing. Although the river was once stocked with trout, the Park Service has not stocked the river since the 1970s, in favor of letting the fishery return to natural conditions. While rainbow, brown, and brook trout are found in various stretches of the river, only rainbows are native to the Sierra Nevada, the others having been planted by sportsmen in the early 20th century. The river is generally low and warm enough for wading by early autumn. In order to preserve the natural fishery, only catch and release is allowed for rainbows. A California state fishing license is required for visitors 16 years or older. The rainbow trout in the Kings river are small, usually no more than 8 to 9 inches (20 to 23 cm).

In order to protect riparian habitat, the gently flowing South Fork is closed to boating in Cedar Grove between Bubbs Creek and the western boundary of the park. However, swimming is allowed in certain sections of the river, with Muir Rock and the Red Bridge being popular swimming holes. Although there are many alpine lakes in the park at high elevations, most are impractical to access for boating or swimming. Nearby Hume Lake, formed by a historic mill-pond dam, is located in the Sequoia National Forest between the two sections of the park and is used for boating, swimming and fishing.

Most of the park's other rivers are extremely steep and fast-flowing, and are suitable only for advanced kayaking. The Kings River above Pine Flat Reservoir is a commercial whitewater run with its put-in near the western boundary of the park, but most of the run itself is on national forest. Most rivers in the park itself are inaccessible by road. The Middle Fork is one of the most difficult-to-access whitewater runs in the entire state, since boats and equipment must be carried through miles of backcountry to reach it. Canoe Kayak magazine describes the Middle Fork run, which passes through some of the most isolated parts of the Sierra, as "the very definition of epic with paddlers traveling around the world just to make a once-in-a-lifetime descent". Kayakers take about five days to descend the Class V Middle Fork from its 12,000-foot (3,700 m) headwaters to 900 feet (270 m) at Pine Flat Reservoir.

== See also ==
- Fauna of the Sierra Nevada (United States)
- Bibliography of the Sierra Nevada
- Ecology of the Sierra Nevada
- Giant Sequoia National Monument
- List of national parks of the United States
- List of plants of the Sierra Nevada (U.S.)
- List of U.S. National Parks by elevation
- National parks in California
- National Register of Historic Places listings in Sequoia-Kings Canyon National Parks
- Protected areas of the Sierra Nevada
