= Monarch Wilderness =

Protected wilderness area in California, United States

- IUCN category Ib (wilderness area)
- Location within California Location within the United States
- Interactive map of Monarch Wilderness
- Location: Fresno County, California
- Nearest city: Fresno, California
- Coordinates: 36°52′35″N 118°45′10″W
- Area: 44,896 acres (181.69 km^{2})
- Established: September 28, 1984
- Governing body: United States Forest Service/United States Department of Agriculture

The Monarch Wilderness (also Monarch Wilderness Complex) is a federally designated wilderness area located 70 miles east of Fresno, California, in the Sierra Nevada mountain range. It encompasses 44,896 acres (181.69 km^{2}) within both the Sequoia National Forest and the Sierra National Forest and is managed by the United States Forest Service. Elevations range from 950 feet (290 m) to 11,081 ft (3,377 m).

== History ==
Formerly known as the High Sierra Primitive Area, the California Wilderness Act of 1984 created the Monarch Wilderness and became part of the National Wilderness Preservation System.

The Monarch Wilderness contains over 30 miles of trails providing views of Kings Canyon, High Sierra backcountry, and routes into the canyon itself. Significant elevation changes support a transition of vegetation from chaparral to sub-alpine and alpine zones, containing a wide representation of regional tree species. Above the timberline, the landscape shifts to exposed rock. The remote area has stands of Giant Sequoias and trails leading to the Grizzly Lakes region. A granite scramble above Upper Grizzly Lake provides access to the Monarch Divide.

Within the Sequoia National Forest section of the Monarch there is only one main lake, Grizzly Lake, which offers beautiful views, access to the sublime heights of the Monarch Divide and a much more remote camping experience. The Boulder Creek drainage cuts through parts of the southern section of the Monarch and is the main water source in that area. But many creeks in the Monarch often run dry in the hot summer months. There are three trailheads that offer entry into the wilderness: Deer Cove, Kennedy Meadow and Deer Meadow. Parts of this wilderness area were heavily affected by the 2015 Rough Fire and have only recently been reopened to the public, while others remain closed.

Adjacent to the wilderness are several roadless areas: Kings Range Special Management Area (SMA), Agnew Roadless Area and the Oat Mountain Roadless Area. The name Monarch Wilderness Complex includes the wilderness proper and these adjacent lands for a total size of 114,347 acres (462.75 km^{2}).

The wilderness portion is separated into north and south units by the corridor of State Route 180. The larger northern half has the South and Middle Forks of the Kings River. The Middle Fork is a rugged area with a steep gorge about 6,000 feet (1,800 m) deep. From the river the Tombstone Ridge rises to an elevation of 9,071 feet (2,765 m) at the summit of The Obelisk. Major tributaries in the north unit are Tombstone Creek and Silver Creek. Also in the north unit is the Monarch Divide, crowned by peaks such as Wren Peak (9,450 ft or 2,880 m), Mount Harrington (11,009 ft or 3,356 m), and an unnamed high point summit at 11,081 ft (3,377 m). The lowest and highest elevations in the north unit are separated by as much as 8,700 feet (2,700 m) of relief.

The south unit was formerly a part of the Agnew Roadless Area and contains groves of giant sequoia including the Agnew Grove which is one of the few groves in the Sierra outside the boundaries of the Sequoia-Kings Canyon Wilderness.

Native species of rare plants include Congdon's lewisia (Lewisia congdonii), state-listed as rare in 1982 and the Tehipite Valley jewelflower (Streptanthus fenestratus). Also the woollyhead lessingia (Lessingia hololeuca) and Hall's daisy (Erigeron aequifolius), both of the Aster family.

== Kings River Special Management Area ==
The United States Congress established the Kings River Special Management Area (SMA) in 1987 (Pub. L. 100–150) to "provide for public outdoor recreation use and enjoyment...to protect those areas' natural, archaeological, and scenic resources, and to provide for appropriate fish and wildlife management..".. The SMA is managed by the Sierra National Forest which can limit certain uses of the area, such as timber cutting, hunting and fishing. There is no mining allowed within the SMA. A management plan is required that includes a provision for "management of vegetation within the area designed to enhance the wildlife carrying capacity of the area". The law does not change existing off-road vehicle management rules, but does require the establishment of a trail into Little Tehipite Valley.

The special management area is located at the confluence of the Kings River and the North Fork, and protects the deepest part of the Kings Canyon as well as stands of giant sequoia (the Cabin Creek and Converse Mountain Groves), the world's largest trees, and important wintering ranges for the Monarch and Hume deer herds. The SMA provides habitat for deer, black bear, coyote, marten, gray fox and a variety of birds. Bats are common in the limestone caves in the southeast portion of the SMA.

== Recreation and access ==
Day hiking, backpacking, nature photography and whitewater rafting are some of the activities in the wilderness. The north unit requires permits for overnight use. The main trail in this area is the 9-mile Deer Cove Trail which provides access to the Monarch Divide.

The south unit of the wilderness in Sequoia National Forest does not require permits and has three trailheads and three main trails into the wilderness. The Kanawyer Trail is 12 miles (19 km) in length and goes to Sequoia National Park to the west. The SMA unit contains numerous waterfalls and pools of the Kings Canyon. The three-mile-long (5 km) Kings River National Recreation Trail provides access up-canyon along the river.
