= Colosseum Mountain =

Double summit mountain in the state of California

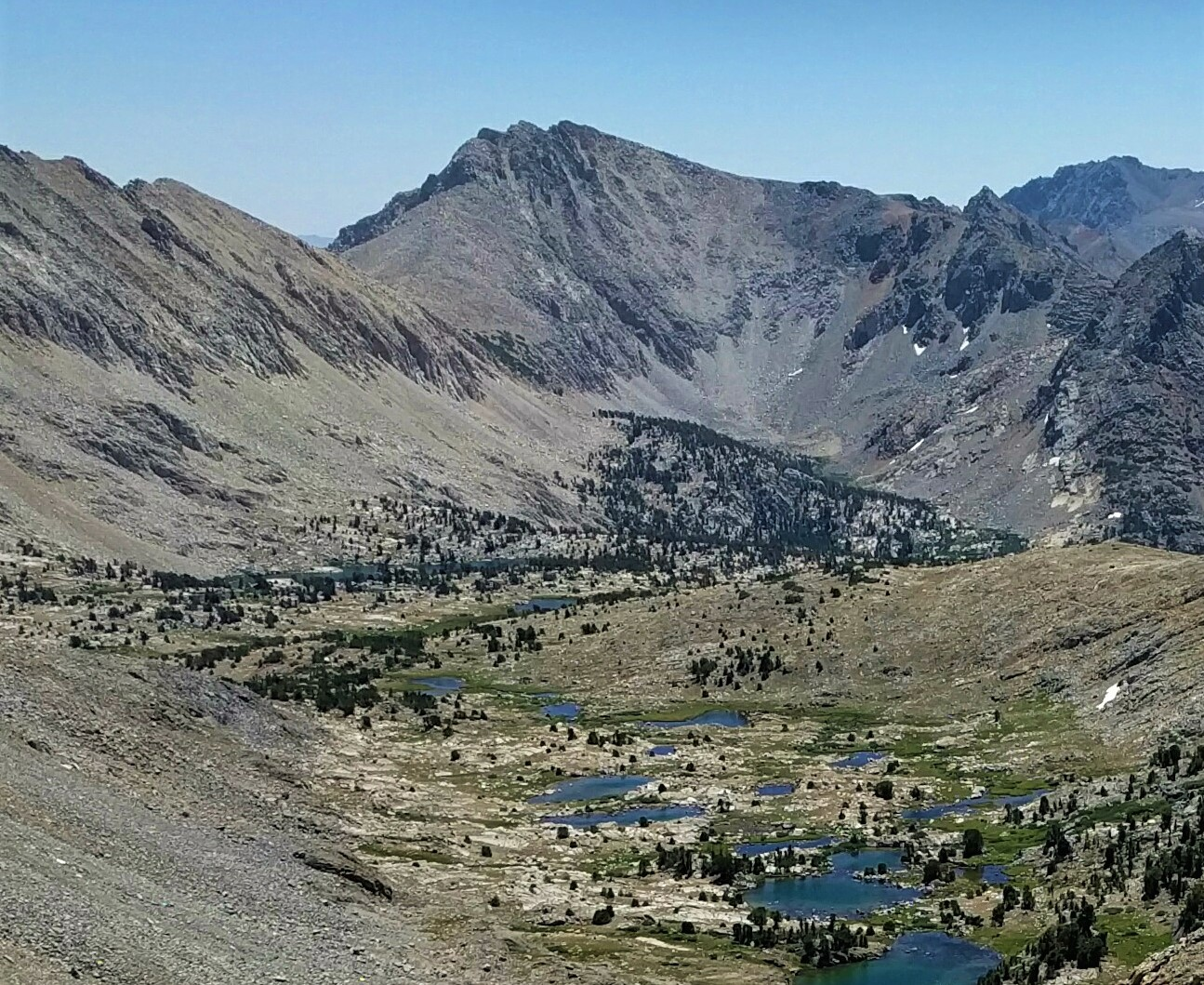
- Northeast aspect, from near Pinchot Pass

Highest point
- Elevation: 12,456 ft (3,797 m) NAVD 88
- Prominence: 805 ft (245 m)
- Parent peak: Mount Perkins (12,566 ft)
- Listing: Sierra Peaks Section; Vagmarken Club Sierra Crest List
- Coordinates: 36°54′26″N 118°22′01″W

Geography
- Location within California Location within the United States
- Location: Kings Canyon National Park; Fresno / Inyo counties California, U.S.
- Parent range: Sierra Nevada
- Topo map: USGS Aberdeen

Climbing
- First ascent: August 5, 1922
- Easiest route: Hike, class 1

Colosseum Mountain is a 12,473-foot-elevation (3,802-meter) double summit mountain located on the crest of the Sierra Nevada mountain range in northern California. It is situated on the common border of Fresno County with Inyo County, as well as the shared boundary of John Muir Wilderness and Kings Canyon National Park. It is 12 miles (19 km) northwest of the community of Independence, 1.2 miles (1.9 km) east of Mount Cedric Wright, 2.6 miles (4.2 km) west of Sawmill Point, and 1.6 miles (2.6 km) south-southeast of Mount Perkins, the nearest higher neighbor. The lower east summit is 12,451-feet in elevation and marked as Colosseum Mountain on maps, but the 12,473-foot west summit is higher. Approximately 1,000 feet distance separate the two summits. The John Muir Trail passes to the west of this peak, providing an approach to the mountain. The first ascent of the summit was made August 5, 1922, by Chester Versteeg, a prominent Sierra Club member, via the southwest face.

== Climate ==
According to the Köppen climate classification system, Colosseum Mountain has an alpine climate. Most weather fronts originate in the Pacific Ocean, and travel east toward the Sierra Nevada mountains. As fronts approach, they are forced upward by the peaks, causing them to drop their moisture in the form of rain or snowfall onto the range (orographic lift). Precipitation runoff from this mountain drains west into Woods Creek, which is a tributary of the South Fork Kings River, and east to the Owens Valley via Division Creek.

== Climbing ==
Established climbing routes on Colosseum Mountain:

- Southwest slope – class 1 – First ascent 1922
- West Ridge – class 1
- Northwest Chute – class 2
- North Ridge – class 4

== See also ==
- List of mountain peaks of California

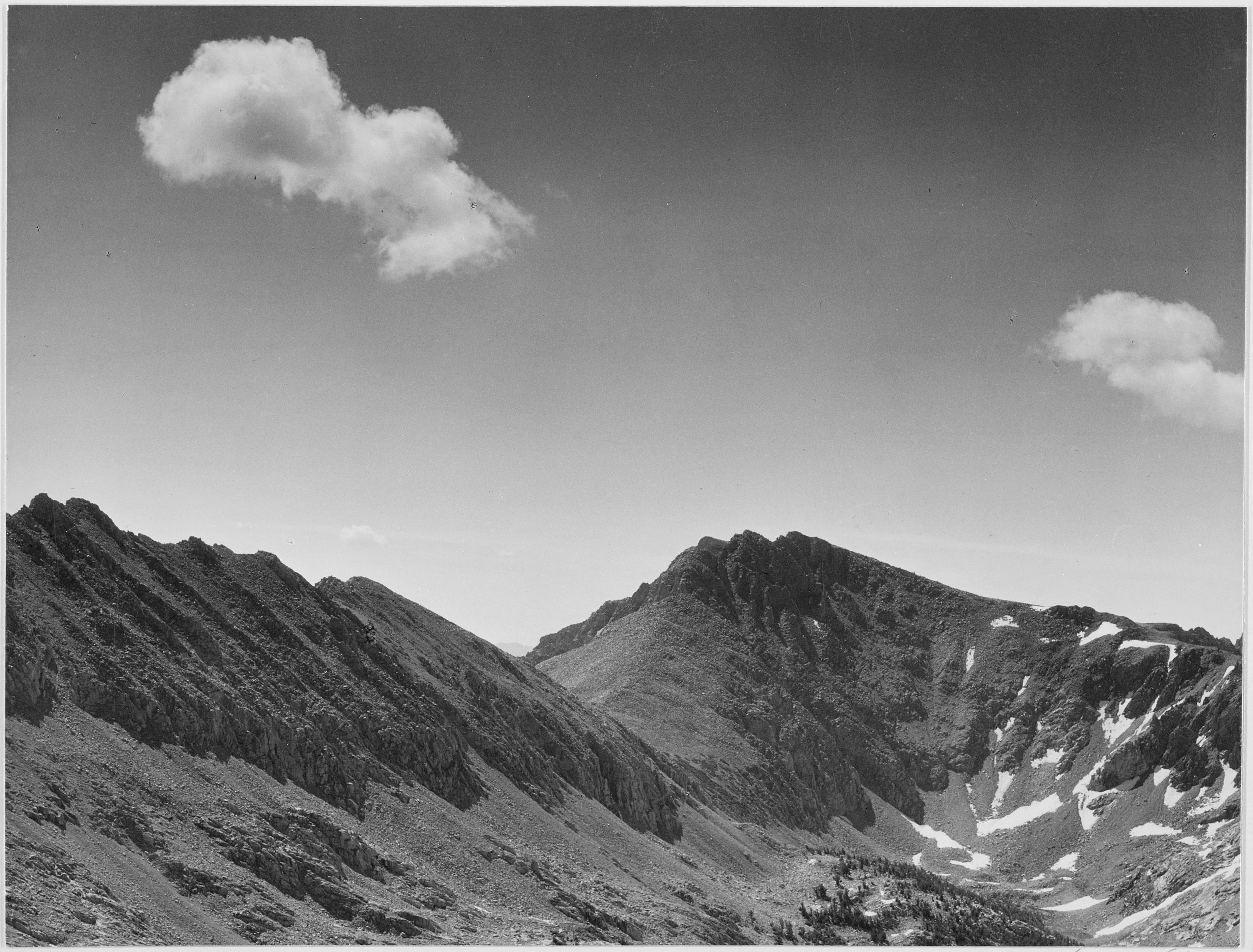
Colosseum Mountain by Ansel Adams
