= Pyramid Peak (Fresno County, California) =

Mountain in the American state of California

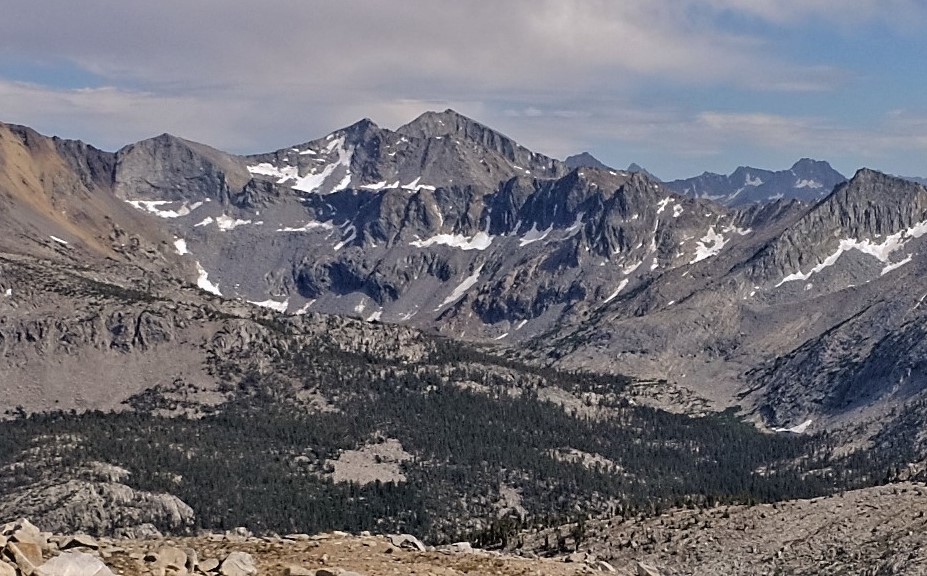
- North aspect, centered in the distance

Highest point
- Elevation: 12,779 ft (3,895 m)
- Prominence: 608 ft (185 m)
- Parent peak: Mount Ickes (12,959 ft)
- Isolation: 2.19 mi (3.52 km)
- Listing: Sierra Peaks Section
- Coordinates: 36°54′23″N 118°27′44″W

Geography
- Location within California Location within the United States
- Location: Kings Canyon National Park; Fresno County; California, U.S.
- Parent range: Sierra Nevada
- Topo map: USGS Mount Pinchot

Geology
- Rock age: Cretaceous
- Mountain type: Fault block
- Rock type: Granodiorite

Climbing
- First ascent: 1942
- Easiest route: class 2 South ridge

Pyramid Peak is a 12,779-foot-elevation (3,895-meter) mountain summit located west of the crest of the Sierra Nevada mountain range, in Fresno County, California, United States. It is situated in Kings Canyon National Park, 2.2 miles (3.5 km) southwest of line parent Mount Ickes and 2.2 miles (3.5 km) southeast of Arrow Peak, which is the nearest higher neighbor. Other nearby peaks include Crater Mountain 2.5 miles (4.0 km) to the northeast, and Window Peak one mile to the south. Pyramid Peak ranks as the 214th-highest summit in California, and topographic relief is significant as the southwest aspect rises over 2,300 feet (700 meters) in approximately one mile.

== Etymology ==
This mountain was likely named by Joseph Nisbet LeConte when he and four companions climbed nearby Arrow Peak in June 1902 and noted an "unnamed, unknown peak", which he would later list as "Pyramid". The toponym was labeled on the 1907 Mt. Whitney Quadrangle topographic map, and has been officially adopted by the United States Board on Geographic Names.

== Climbing ==
One possible approach option to this remote peak is the John Muir Trail which passes to the east of the mountain. The first ascent of the summit was made July 21, 1942, by Art Reyman via a traverse from Window Peak to the south ridge. Inclusion on the Sierra Peaks Section peakbagging list generates climbing interest.

== Climate ==
According to the Köppen climate classification system, Pyramid Peak is located in an alpine climate zone. Most weather fronts originate in the Pacific Ocean, and travel east toward the Sierra Nevada mountains. As fronts approach, they are forced upward by the peaks (orographic lift), causing them to drop their moisture in the form of rain or snowfall onto the range. Precipitation runoff from the mountain drains into tributaries of the South Fork Kings River.

== See also ==
- List of mountain peaks of California

== Gallery ==
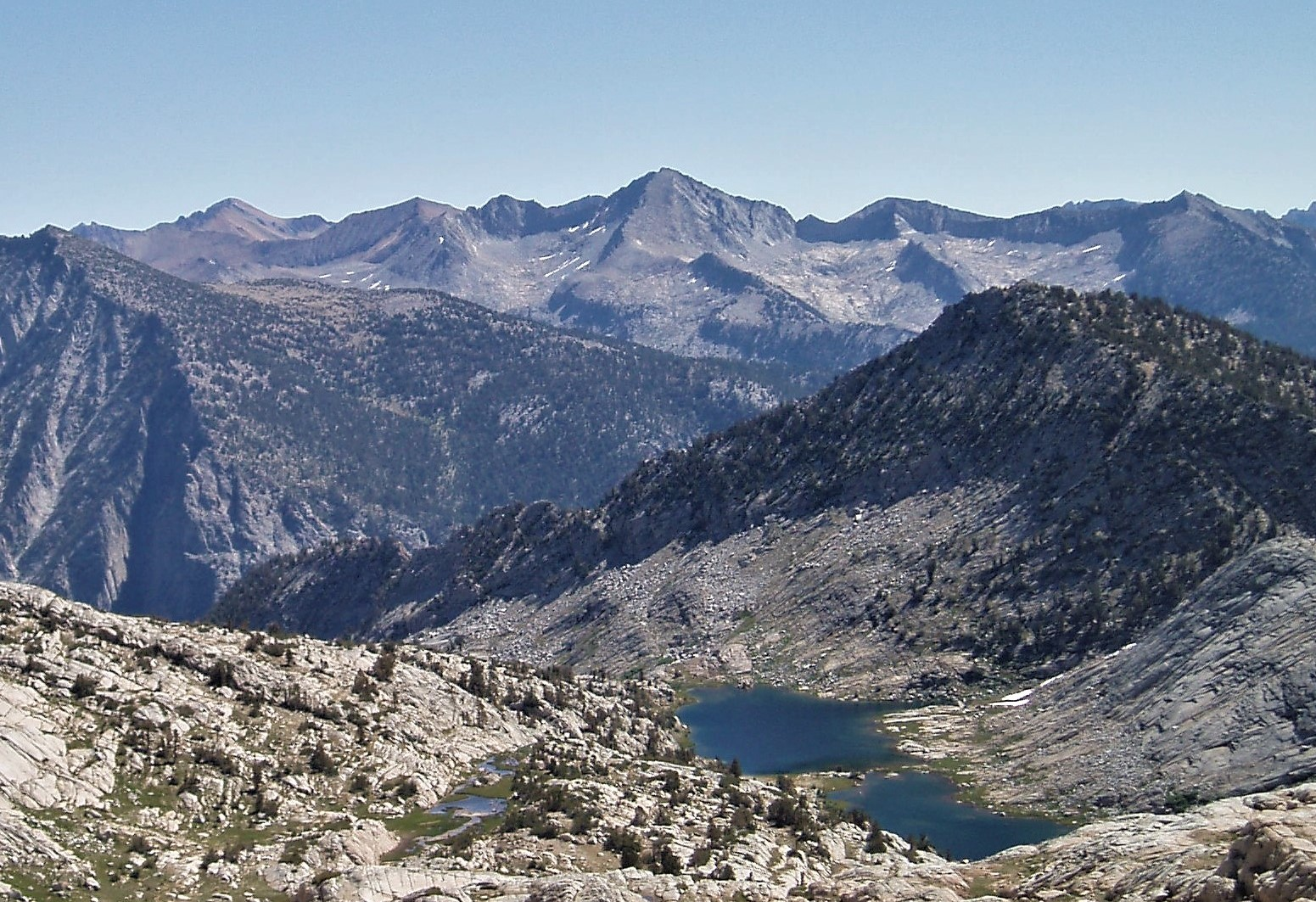
Pyramid Peak centered in the distance, from WSW

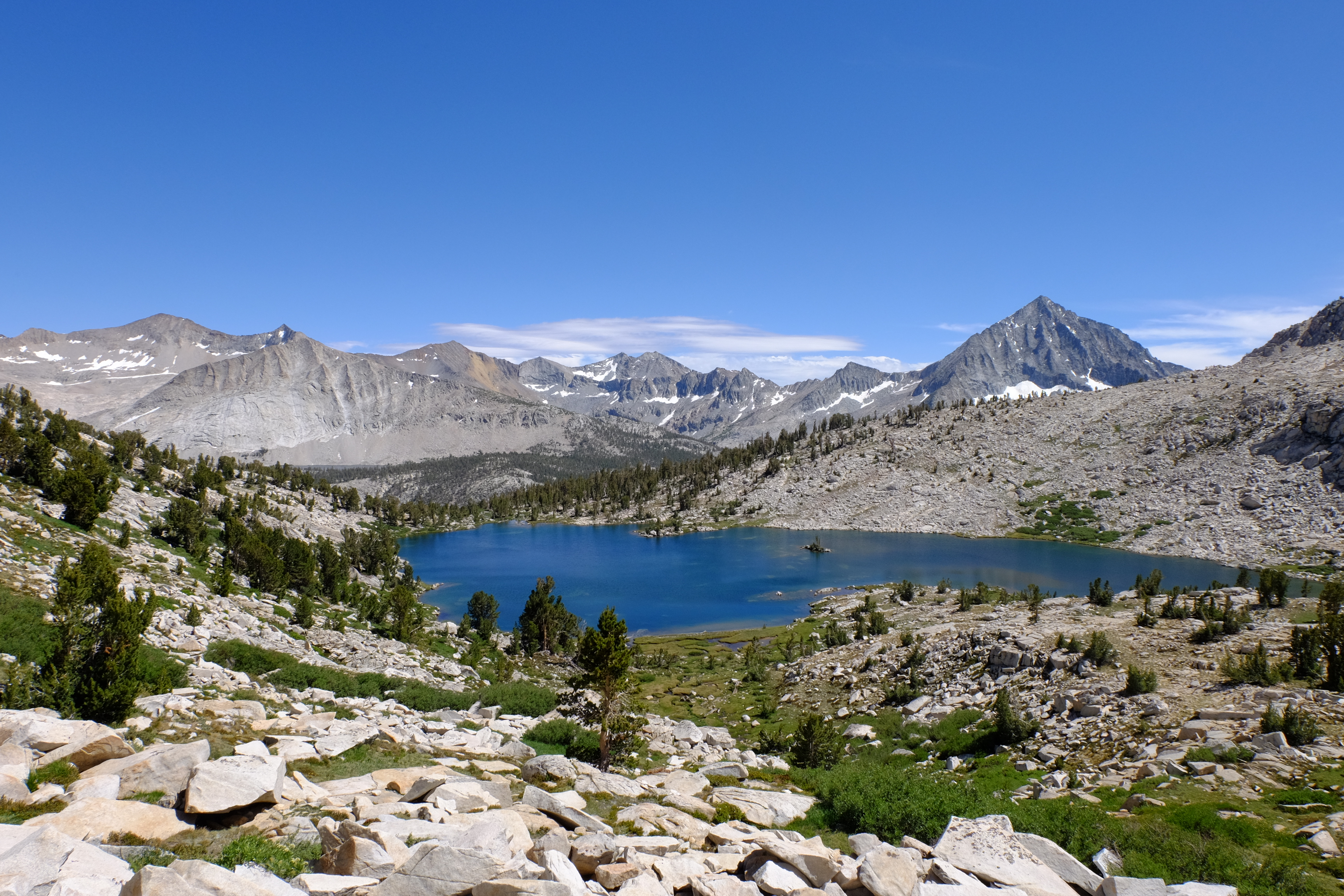
View south from near Cartridge Pass. Mt. Ickes to left, Pyramid Peak centered in the distance, Arrow Peak to right
