= Cedric Wright =

American photographer and musician (1889-1959)

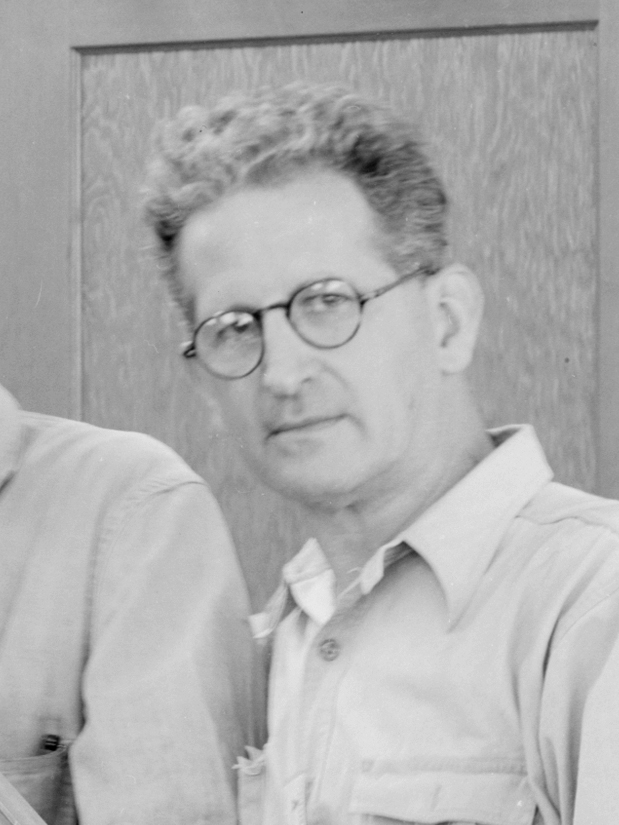
Cedric Wright in 1943

George Cedric Wright (April 13, 1889 – 1959) was an American violinist and a wilderness photographer of the High Sierra. He was Ansel Adams's mentor and best friend for decades, and accompanied Adams when three of his most famous photographs were taken. He was a longtime participant in the annual wilderness High Trips sponsored by the Sierra Club.

== Family ==
Cedric Wright was born and raised in Alameda, California. His father was a successful attorney, and one of his father's clients was astronomer Charles Hitchcock Adams, Ansel Adams's father. Cedric's uncle, William Hammond Wright, was also an astronomer who became head of Lick Observatory. As a result of his father's success, Wright was financially comfortable throughout his life.

His first wife was Mildred Sahlström, and they had a daughter, Alberta. After they divorced, he married pianist and piano teacher Rhea Ufford in 1929. They had a daughter, Joanne, and a son, David.

== Violinist ==
Wright was motivated to become a violinist when he heard a performance by Fritz Kreisler. After study in the United States, he spent seven years studying with Otakar Ševčík in Prague and Vienna.

Wright was known as a "distinguished violinist", and was a violin teacher at the University of California Extension and Mills College for many years. Renowned violin teacher and conductor Louis Persinger called him "one of the foremost performers and instructors in the West". In 1934, arthritis brought an early end to his professional career as a violinist, and he then decided to pursue his hobby of photography as a career.

== Friendship and collaboration with Ansel Adams ==
Wright first met Ansel Adams at a family gathering at the Wright family vacation home in the Santa Cruz Mountains when Cedric was about 21 and Ansel was about 8 years old. They encountered each other again on a four-week wilderness High Trip in Yosemite National Park, organized by the Sierra Club in 1923. Nancy Newhall wrote, "On that first High Trip, Ansel found himself drawn to one Cedric Wright, a violinist, who could fiddle by the fire deep into the night and still be among the first up, making a little fire of twigs..."

Their friendship, which continued until Wright's death in 1959, was described by Mary Street Alinder as an "intense comradeship". The men shared a deep interest in both classical music and photography, since Adams was an accomplished classical pianist. Wright introduced Adams to the writings of the British philosopher Edward Carpenter, whose thoughts helped shape both men's world views. Together, they discussed the works of other writers, including Elbert Hubbard and Walt Whitman.

Back in the Bay Area after their initial 1923 wilderness journey together had ended, Adams became a part of Wright's social circle of musicians and Sierra Club activists who gathered at his Berkeley home. Adams "idolized" Wright, and he followed in Wright's footsteps by taking long trips into the wilderness of the Sierra Nevada each summer, photographing the remote mountain peaks.

In his autobiography, Ansel Adams called Cedric Wright "my best friend for many years". He described Wright as "almost an occupant of another world and a creator and messenger of beauty and mysteries. Perhaps his greatest gift was that of imparting confidence to those who were wavering on the edge of fear and indecision; often it was me."

In 1926, Wright introduced Adams to Albert Bender, a patron of the arts who was to play an instrumental role in Adams's enormous success as a photographer. Wright was also a close friend of Virginia Best, who was Adams' girlfriend for years. Wright visited with her when Adams was away on photography trips, and she confided in him about the problems in her relationship with Adams. Wright was their best man when they were married on January 2, 1928.

Wright accompanied and assisted Adams when he took three of the most famous photographs of his career:

On April 10, 1927, Wright hiked with Adams, Virginia Best, Charles Michael and another photographer, Arnold Williams, to a rocky perch high above Yosemite Valley called the "Diving Board". There, Adams took Monolith, the Face of Half Dome, which Mary Street Alinder called Adams's "most significant photograph" because it was a triumph of visualization showing "extreme manipulation of tonal values". This photo set Adams on the path of becoming America's most well-known photographer. Adams called the excursion a "personally historic moment in my photographic career."

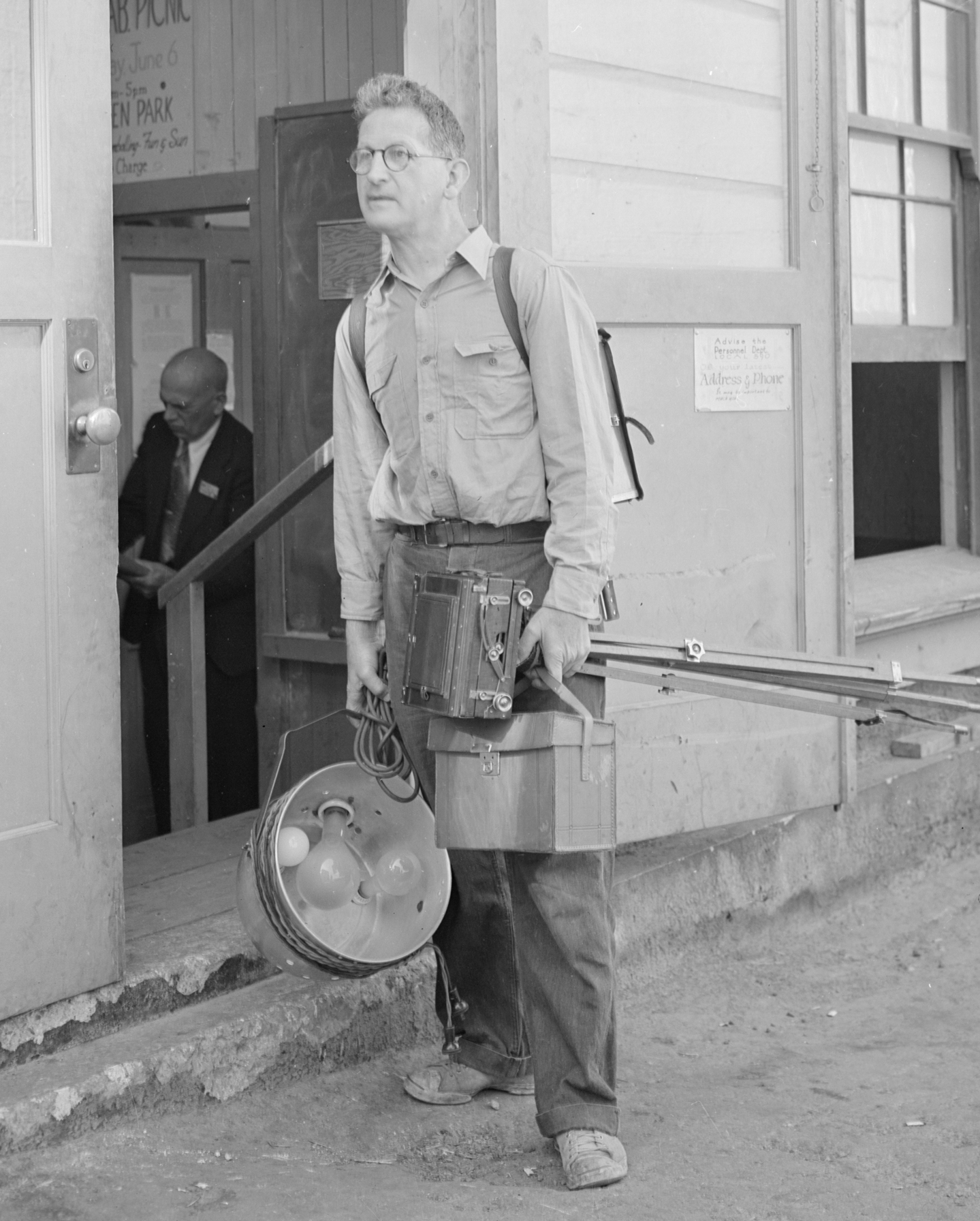
Wright photographing at the Lawrence Radiation Laboratory, 1943

During the 1932 Sierra Club High Trip to Sequoia National Park, Wright and Adams both photographed Precipice Lake near Eagle Scout Peak, while Virginia swam in the lake, still arrayed with icy patches. Wright was shocked when he saw Adams's Frozen Lake and Cliffs, The Sierra Nevada, Sequoia National Park, so much more beautiful than the photos Wright himself had produced. Mary Street Alinder described the image: "Mirrored ghostly upon the inky waters, a shattered black cliff descends into a partially frozen lake."

In 1941, Secretary of the Interior Harold Ickes hired Adams for six months to create photographs of lands under the jurisdiction of the Department of the Interior. Wright accompanied Adams and his young son Michael Adams on a long road trip around the west. While traveling through the Chama River valley near nightfall on November 1, 1941, they encountered a "fantastic scene", a church and cemetery near Hernandez, New Mexico, and pulled to the side of the road. Adams recalled that he yelled at his son Michael and at Wright to "Get this! Get that, for God's sake! We don't have much time!" Desperate to capture the image in the fading light, they scrambled to set up the tripod and camera, knowing that only moments remained before the light was gone. The result was Moonrise, Hernandez, New Mexico, a photograph that became so popular and collectible that Adams personally made over 1,300 photographic prints of it during his long career. On October 17, 2006, Sotheby's auctioned a print of this photograph for $609,600. Art historian H. W. Janson called this photo "a perfect marriage of straight and pure photography".

== Wright's Berkeley home ==
In 1921, Wright purchased an old dairy barn at 2515 Etna Street in Berkeley, California, and hired architect Bernard Maybeck to remodel it into a home. Nicknamed "the barn", Wright's home featured "a soaring ceiling with room for a rope swing hung from the rafters and space enough for two grand pianos. Maybeck's daughter-in-law Jacomena Maybeck "remembered evenings at Cedric Wright's studio, when the women wore evening dresses and the men wore tuxedos, and there was much music around the big stone fireplace."

The home was known as "party central" among Sierra Club members of the era. Among that social circle were Richard M. Leonard and his wife Doris, Francis P. Farquhar and his wife Marjorie, David Brower and his wife Anne, Edgar Wayburn and his wife Peggy, and Wright's best friends, Ansel Adams and his wife Virginia. Nancy Newhall described the atmosphere: "Meanwhile in Cedric Wright's house among the redwoods in Berkeley, Ansel was finding a warm welcome ... In his house there was music for violin and piano; there was poetry, especially Whitman."

== Sierra Club High Trips ==
The High Trips were large wilderness excursions organized and led by the Sierra Club, beginning in 1901. While most of these excursions were to the High Sierra, some were to other destinations, such as the Canadian Rockies in 1928. Wright's photos of that trip, along with those of Adams and other photographers, were included in a portfolio produced to commemorate it. No other member participated in as many High Trips as Wright, and David Brower recounted that Wright told him in 1953 that he had participated in 33 High Trips. Tom Turner wrote that "Wright was a tireless and talented photographer of the mountain scene, who entertained campers with his fiddle and loved to greet weary hikers at day's end with an unexpected cup of tea or soup." During the High Trips, Wright and his student Dorothy Minty would often entertain groups of 200 participants with performances of Bach's Double Violin Concerto.

== Photographer, inventor and writer ==
Arthritis forced Wright to give up his career as a violinist in 1934, and he resolved to pursue his hobby of photography as a new career. In 1939 the Museum of Modern Art accepted six of Wright's photographs, donated by Albert Bender, into its photography collection. These were followed by another ten prints the following year. Several of his photos were displayed at the Golden Gate International Exposition in San Francisco in 1939 and 1940. Wright's work was also featured in a 1943 exhibition at The Museum of Modern Art called "Action Photography", along with work by Erich Salomon, Peter Stackpole, Alfred Stieglitz, Paul Strand and Weegee.

He was issued a United States patent for a portable photo-printing device in 1935. He also made various devices, including "collapsible and portable latrines" for the High Trips, and "astonishingly solid camera and violin cases of varnished plywood with leather thongs, which would tolerate the rigors of being packed for a month on muleback."

In an article published in 1957, which included eight full-page photographs, Wright described his thoughts about how high mountain beauty resembles great music: "Beauty haunts the high country like a majestic hymn, sings in cold sunny air, the brilliant mountain air—makes of sunlight a living thing—floats in cloud forms—filters changing floods of light ever clothing the mountains anew. Beauty arrives in deep voice of river and wind through forest, swelling the chorus, giving sonority universal proportions." He dedicated these words to Sierra Club leader William Edward Colby, and they became part of the introduction to Wright's posthumous book, Words of the Earth.

== Final years ==
Ansel Adams described Wright's final years as "complex and difficult". He suffered a stroke, which caused a personality change, and he became "rigid and dictatorial", which was a "painful experience for all his friends." Wright died in 1959.

== Legacy ==
After his death, Nancy Newhall edited and completed his book, Words of the Earth, which was among the first titles published by Sierra Club Books in 1960. Ansel Adams wrote the foreword.

In 1961, a 12,362-foot (3768 meter) High Sierra peak was officially named Mount Cedric Wright (36°54′13.9″N 118°23′15.2″W), in memory of Wright, who was described as an "internationally known photographer whose photography has made a significant contribution to the appreciation of the natural scene." The mountain is located in Kings Canyon National Park, 1.9 km (1.2 mi) southwest of Colosseum Mountain and 5.3 km (3.3 mi) south-southeast of Mount Pinchot. Virginia Best Adams later arranged for park ranger Randy Morgenson to scatter Wright's ashes on the slopes of Mount Cedric Wright. In 1976, Ansel Adams and the Sierra Club arranged for Wright's personal papers to be donated to the Bancroft Library at the University of California, Berkeley.

A 2011 exhibit at the Chadwick School featured photos of the school by both Wright and Adams. Two of Wright's children had attended the school. A critic writing for the Los Angeles Times praised Wright's work: "In the Chadwick exhibition, it's Wright who trumps Adams with the show's most jaw-dropping image: a 1947 shot of five boys playing basketball on the school's outdoor court, against a backdrop of rolling hills and the Los Angeles Basin far below. It captures a moment of sheer ballet, the composition so gracefully perfect that one would think it had been choreographed by Balanchine — except that you can't choreograph players leaping for a rebound."
