= Mount Perkins (California) =

Mountain in the American state of California

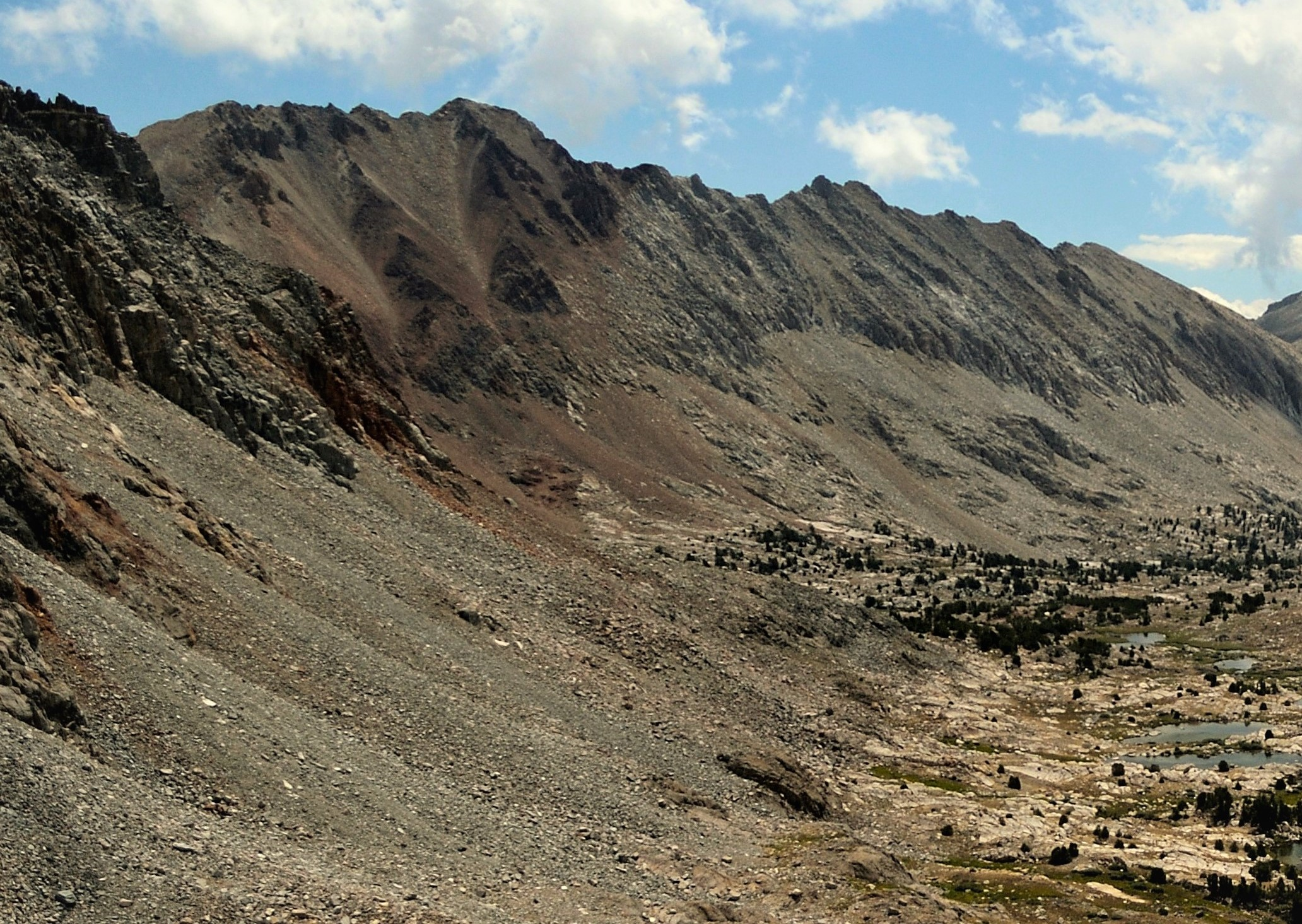
- West aspect

Highest point
- Elevation: 12,572 ft (3,832 m) NAVD 88
- Prominence: 329 ft (100 m)
- Parent peak: Mount Wynne (13,179 ft)
- Isolation: 0.88 mi (1.42 km)
- Listing: Sierra Peaks Section peak; Vagmarken Club Sierra Crest Peak
- Coordinates: 36°55′38″N 118°22′53″W

Naming
- Etymology: George Clement Perkins

Geography
- Location within California Location within the United States
- Location: Kings Canyon National Park; John Muir Wilderness Area; Fresno / Inyo counties, California, U.S.
- Parent range: Sierra Nevada
- Topo map: USGS Mount Pinchot

Climbing
- First ascent: 1910 by Dave King
- Easiest route: class 2

Mount Perkins is a 12,566-foot-elevation (3,830-meter) mountain summit located on the crest of the Sierra Nevada mountain range in northern California. It is situated on the common border of Fresno County with Inyo County, as well as the boundary between John Muir Wilderness and Kings Canyon National Park. It is 13.5 miles (21.7 km) northwest of the community of Independence, 1.65 miles (2.66 km) north of Mount Cedric Wright, 2.2 miles (3.5 km) east of Crater Mountain, and 1.4 miles (2.3 km) southeast of Mount Wynne. Climbing routes to the summit include the west slope, and the north and south ridges. The John Muir Trail traverses below the west base of the peak on its descent south from Pinchot Pass, providing an approach to the mountain.

== History ==
This mountain was named by Sierra Club member Robert D. Pike in 1906 in honor of George Clement Perkins (1839–1923), a Sierra Club charter member, 14th governor of California (1880–1883), and United States senator from California (1893–1915). The first ascent of the summit was made in 1910 by Dave King.

== Climate ==
According to the Köppen climate classification system, Mount Perkins has an alpine climate. Most weather fronts originate in the Pacific Ocean, and travel east toward the Sierra Nevada mountains. As fronts approach, they are forced upward by the peaks, causing them to drop their moisture in the form of rain or snowfall onto the range (orographic lift). Precipitation runoff from this mountain drains west into headwaters of the South Fork Kings River, and east to the Owens Valley via Armstrong Canyon.

== See also ==
- List of mountain peaks of California
