= Sawmill Point =

Mountain in the state of California

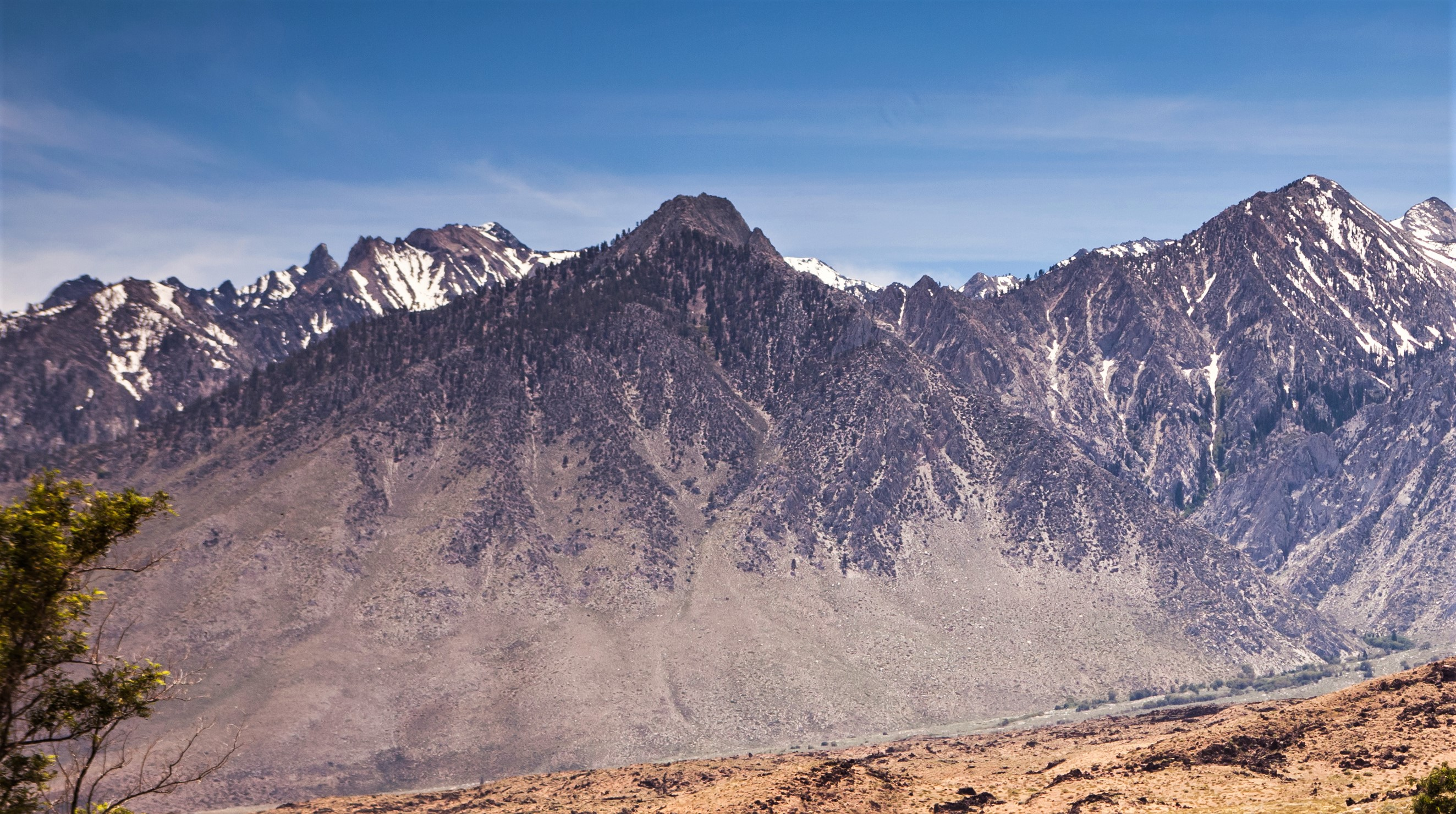
- Northeast aspect, centered

Highest point
- Elevation: 9,429 ft (2,874 m)
- Prominence: 591 ft (180 m)
- Parent peak: Colosseum Mountain (12,473 ft)
- Isolation: 2.58 mi (4.15 km)
- Coordinates: 36°55′01″N 118°19′14″W

Geography
- Location within California Location within the United States
- Location: John Muir Wilderness
- Country: United States of America
- State: California
- County: Inyo County
- Parent range: Sierra Nevada
- Topo map: USGS Aberdeen

Geology
- Rock age: Cretaceous
- Mountain type: Fault block

Climbing
- First ascent: < 1953
- Easiest route: class 3 scrambling

Sawmill Point is a 9,429-foot-elevation (2,874-meter) mountain summit located in Inyo County, California. It is situated 2.6 miles east of the crest of the Sierra Nevada mountain range, in the John Muir Wilderness, on land managed by Inyo National Forest. It is also 10.5 miles (16.9 km) northwest of the community of Independence, and 2.6 miles (4.2 km) east of proximate parent Colosseum Mountain. Topographic relief is significant as the summit rises 4,770 feet (1,450 meters) above Owens Valley in two miles. The Sawmill Pass Trail traverses the east and south slopes of the peak, providing an approach option, and access to the John Muir Trail.

== History ==
The landform's toponym has been officially adopted by the United States Board on Geographic Names. The peak is named in association with Sawmill Creek, which in turn was named for the sawmill that James W. Smith operated along the creek in the 1870s. The first recorded ascent of the summit was made by Art J. Reyman and Fred L. Jones on January 11, 1953, by ascending the northeast ridge. The party was not the first on the summit however, because they found cairns, but no record.

== Climate ==
According to the Köppen climate classification system, Sawmill Point is located in an alpine climate zone. Most weather fronts originate in the Pacific Ocean, and travel east toward the Sierra Nevada mountains. As fronts approach, they are forced upward by the peaks (orographic lift), causing them to drop their moisture in the form of rain or snowfall onto the range. Precipitation runoff from this mountain drains into Division and Sawmill creeks, thence Owens Valley.

== See also ==
- List of mountain peaks of California

== Gallery ==
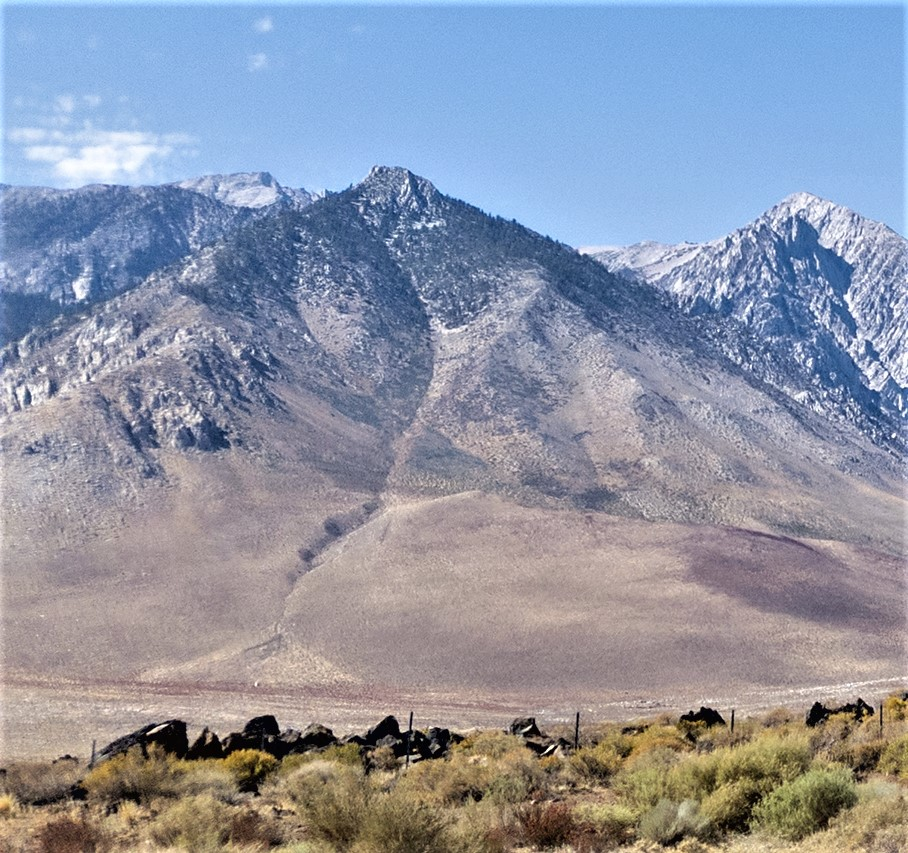
East aspect

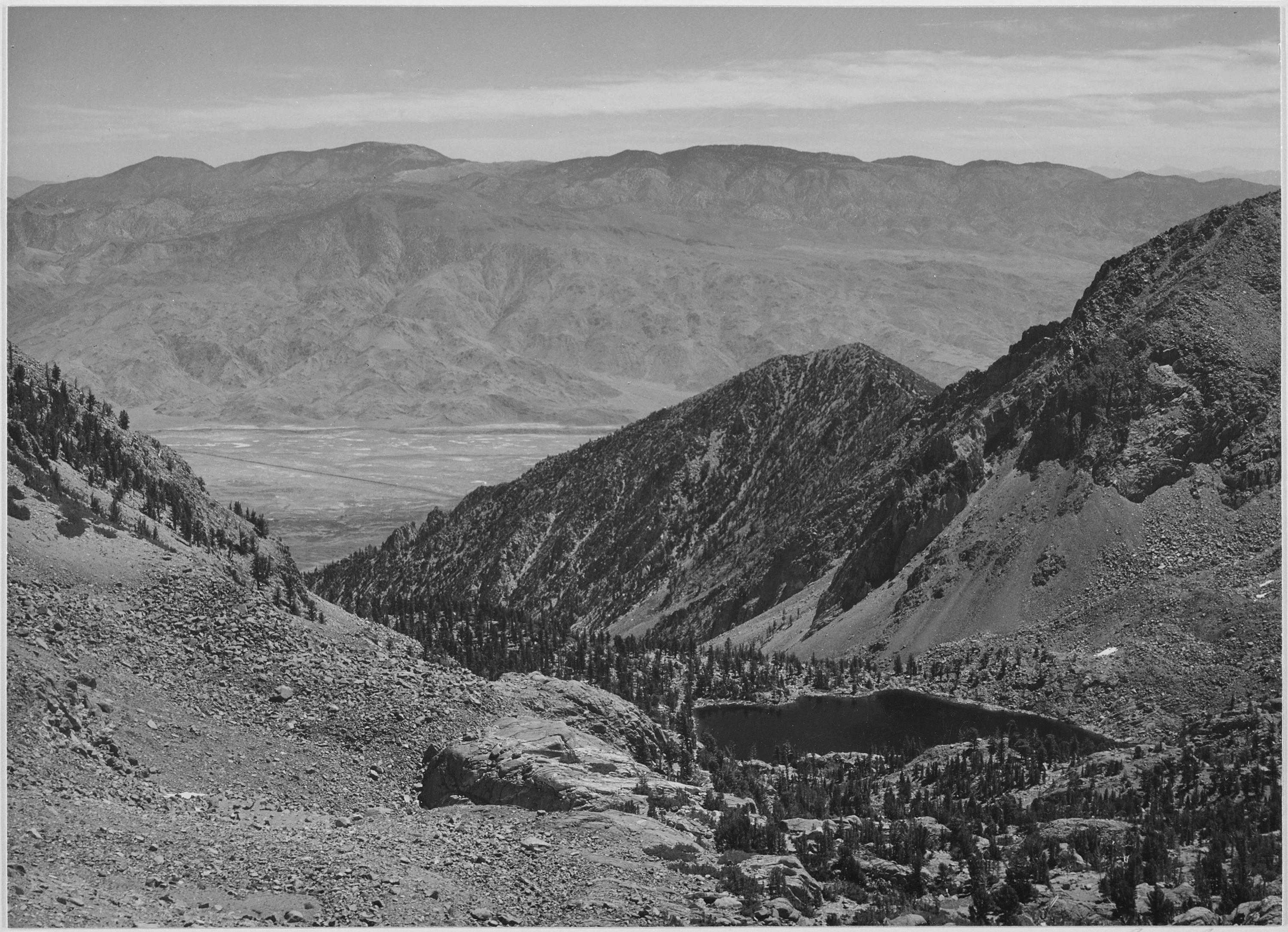
Sawmill Lake and Owens Valley from Sawmill Pass,
by Ansel Adams circa 1941
