= Mount Pinchot (California) =

Mountain in California, United States

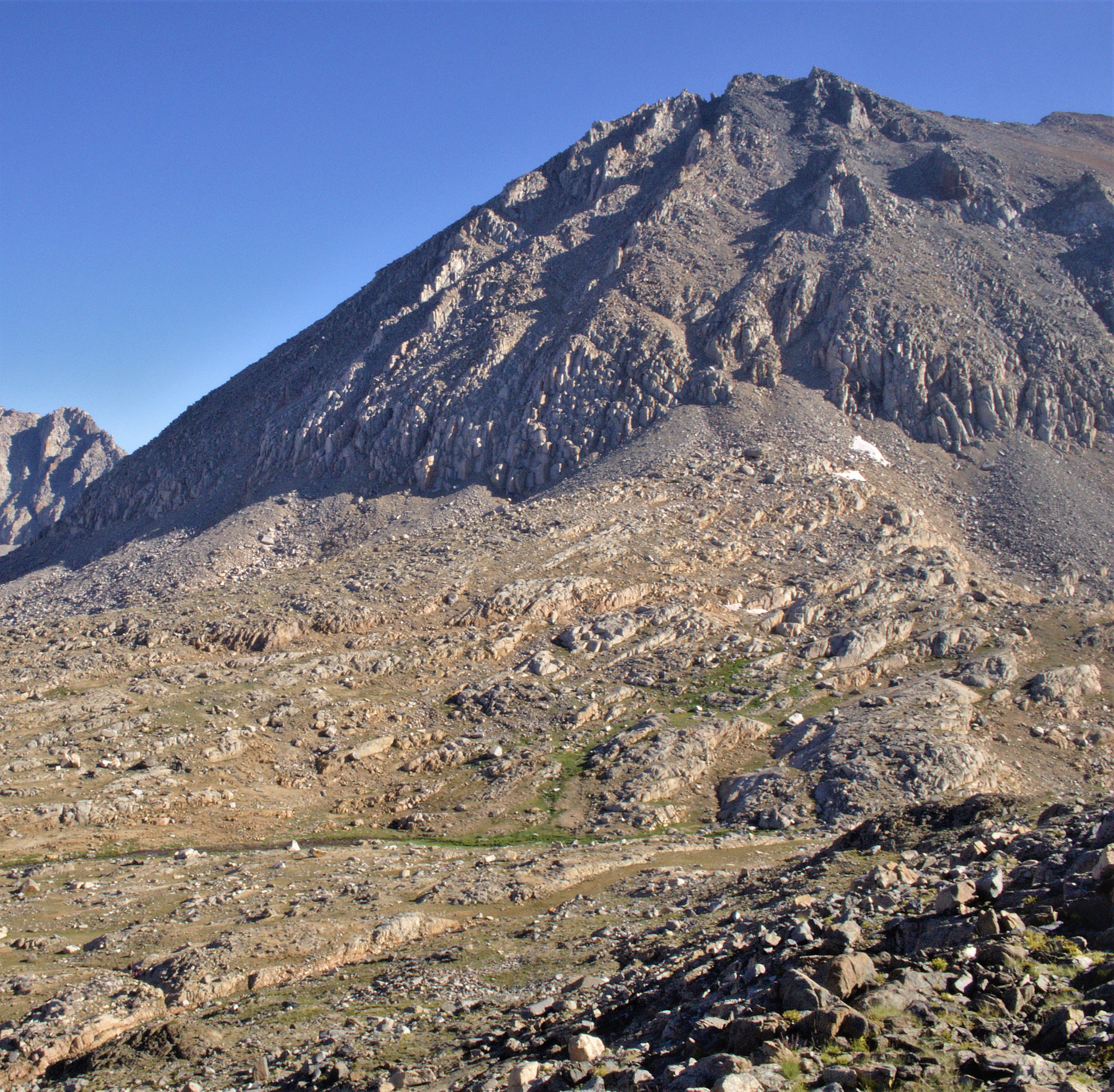
- Mount Pinchot viewed from Pinchot Pass

Highest point
- Elevation: 4,115 m (13,500 ft)
- Prominence: 2,077 ft (633 m)
- Listing: California highest major peaks 14th
- Coordinates: 36°56′50″N 118°24′19″W

Naming
- Etymology: Gifford Pinchot

Geography
- Location within California Location within the United States
- Location: Fresno County, California, U.S.
- Parent range: Sierra Nevada
- Topo map: USGS Mount Pinchot

Mount Pinchot (13,500 ft or 4,115 m) is in the Sierra Nevada in the U.S. state of California. Mount Pinchot is in the Sequoia-Kings Canyon Wilderness of Kings Canyon National Park. The peak lies just northeast of Pinchot Pass and just east of the John Muir Trail.

== See also ==
- Mount Wynne
