= Mount Ickes =

Mountain in the state of California

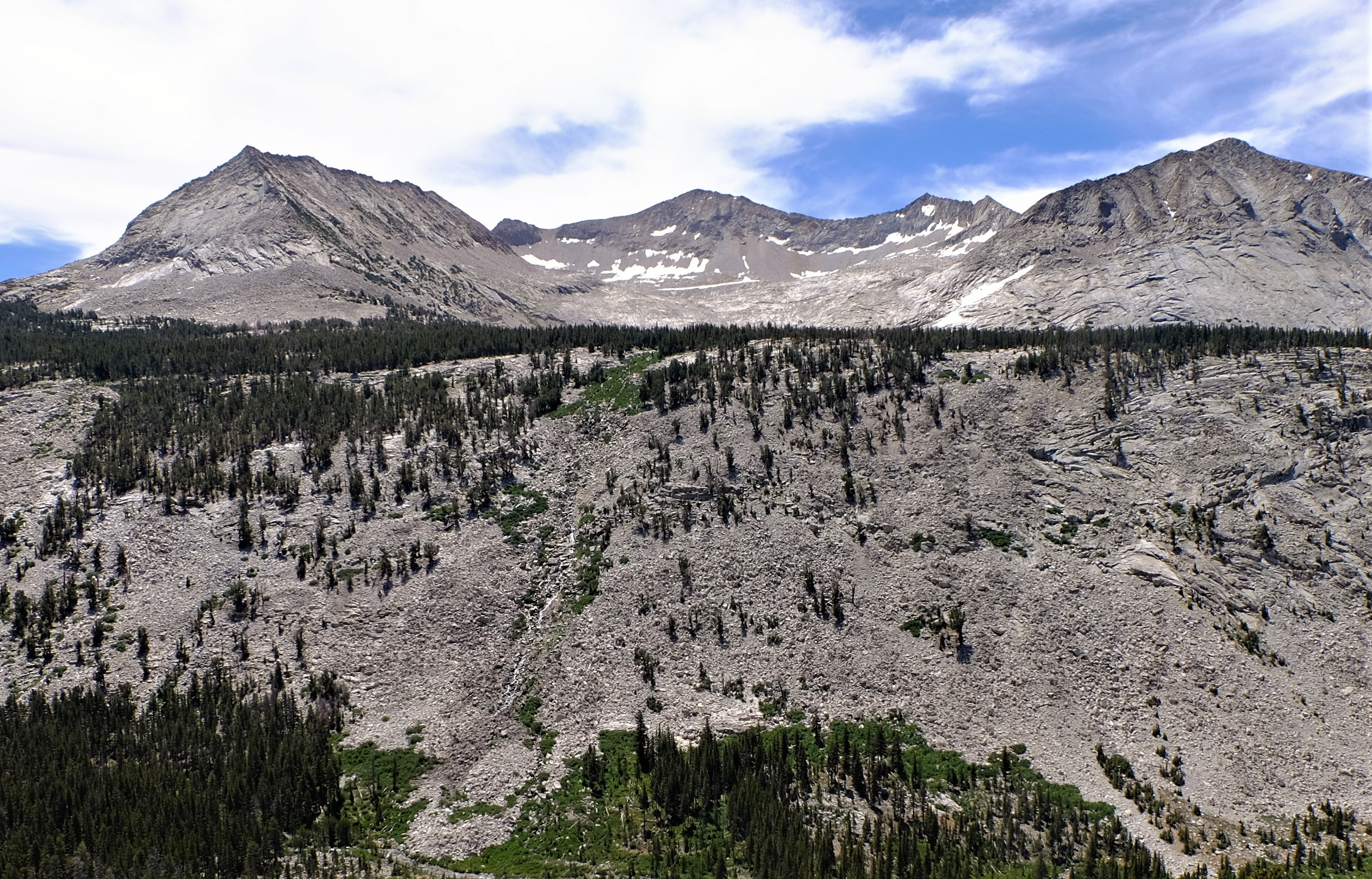
- North aspect, centered in the distance

Highest point
- Elevation: 12,959 ft (3,950 m)
- Prominence: 788 ft (240 m)
- Parent peak: Mount Wynne (13,179 ft)
- Isolation: 2.03 mi (3.27 km)
- Coordinates: 36°55′59″N 118°26′21″W

Naming
- Etymology: Harold L. Ickes

Geography
- Location within California Location within the United States
- Country: United States
- State: California
- County: Fresno
- Protected area: Kings Canyon National Park
- Parent range: Sierra Nevada
- Topo map: USGS Mount Pinchot

Geology
- Mountain type: Fault block
- Rock type: granitic

Climbing
- First ascent: July 25, 1939
- Easiest route: class 2

Mount Ickes is a 12,959-foot-elevation (3,950-meter) mountain summit located west of the crest of the Sierra Nevada mountain range, in Fresno County of northern California, United States. It is situated in eastern Kings Canyon National Park, 13.5 miles (21.7 km) northwest of the community of Independence, 1.5 mile west of Pinchot Pass, and 2 miles (3.2 km) west of Mount Wynne, which is the nearest higher neighbor. Other nearby peaks include Crater Mountain 1.3 miles (2.1 km) to the southeast, Striped Mountain 3 miles (4.8 km) to the northeast, Arrow Peak, three miles (4.8 km) to the west, and Mount Ruskin four miles (6.4 km) to the northwest. Mount Ickes ranks as the 159th highest summit in California. Topographic relief is significant as the north aspect rises 3,080 feet (940 meters) in 2.5 miles. The approach to this remote peak is made via the John Muir Trail which passes to the east of the mountain. The mountain's name was officially adopted in 1964 by the United States Board on Geographic Names to honor Harold L. Ickes (1874–1952), who was responsible for implementing much of President Franklin D. Roosevelt's New Deal as Secretary of the Interior from 1933 to 1946 and was instrumental in establishing Kings Canyon National Park.

== Climate ==
According to the Köppen climate classification system, Mount Ickes is located in an alpine climate zone. Most weather fronts originate in the Pacific Ocean, and travel east toward the Sierra Nevada mountains. As fronts approach, they are forced upward by the peaks, causing them to drop their moisture in the form of rain or snowfall onto the range (orographic lift). Precipitation runoff from the mountain drains into tributaries of the South Fork Kings River.

== Gallery ==
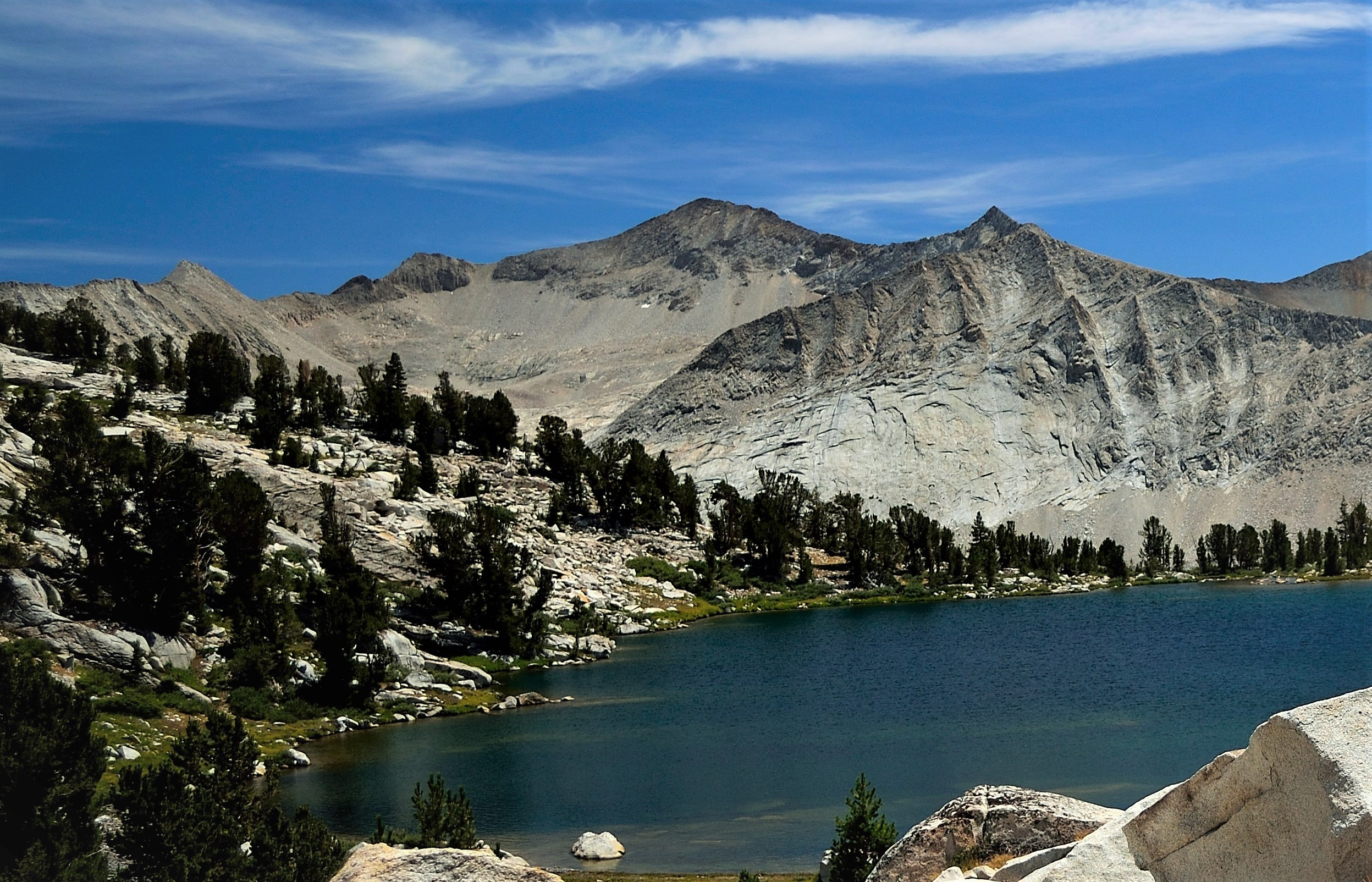
Mount Ickes from northwest at Cartridge Pass Lake

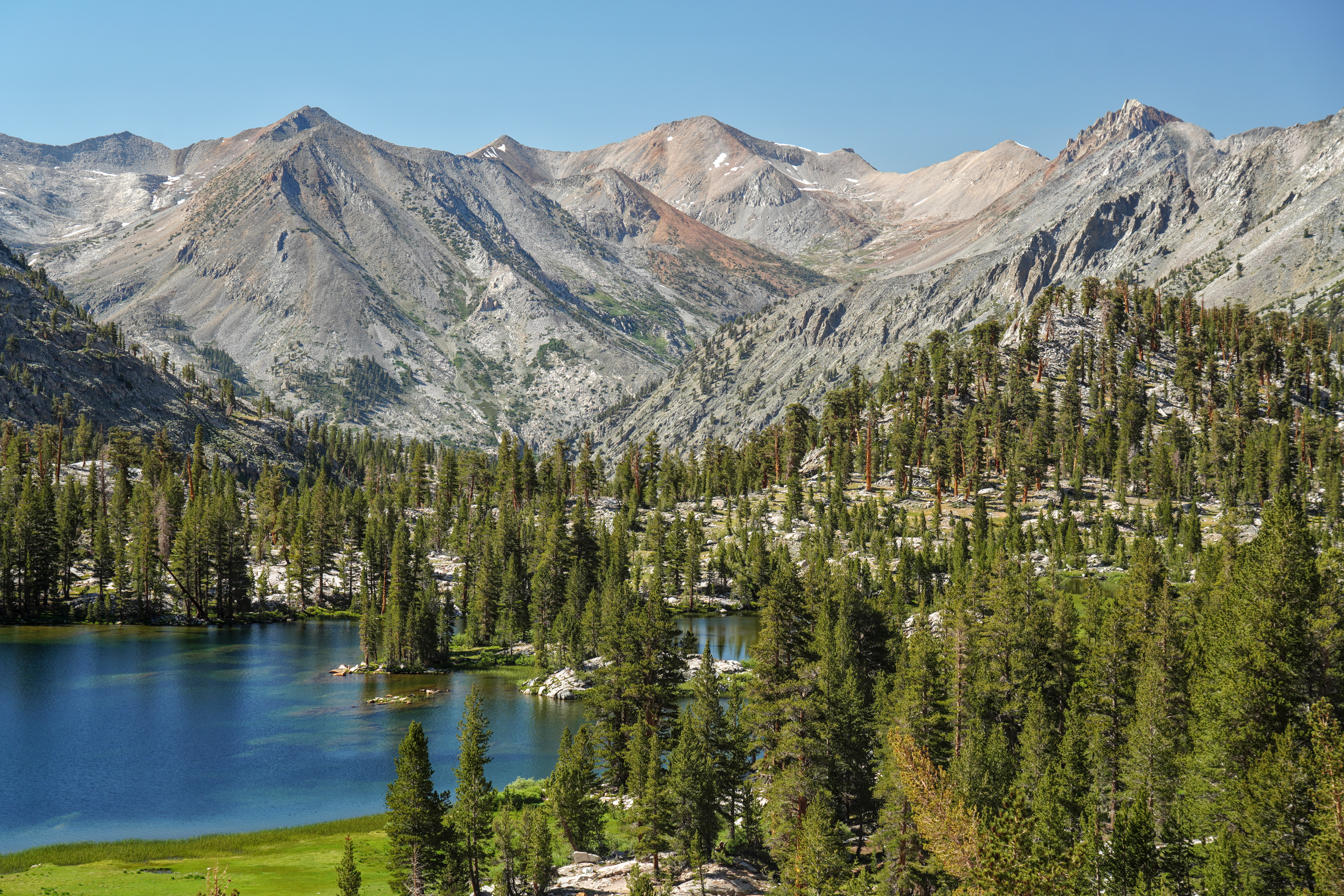
South aspect of Mount Ickes centered on skyline, viewed from Arrowhead Lake

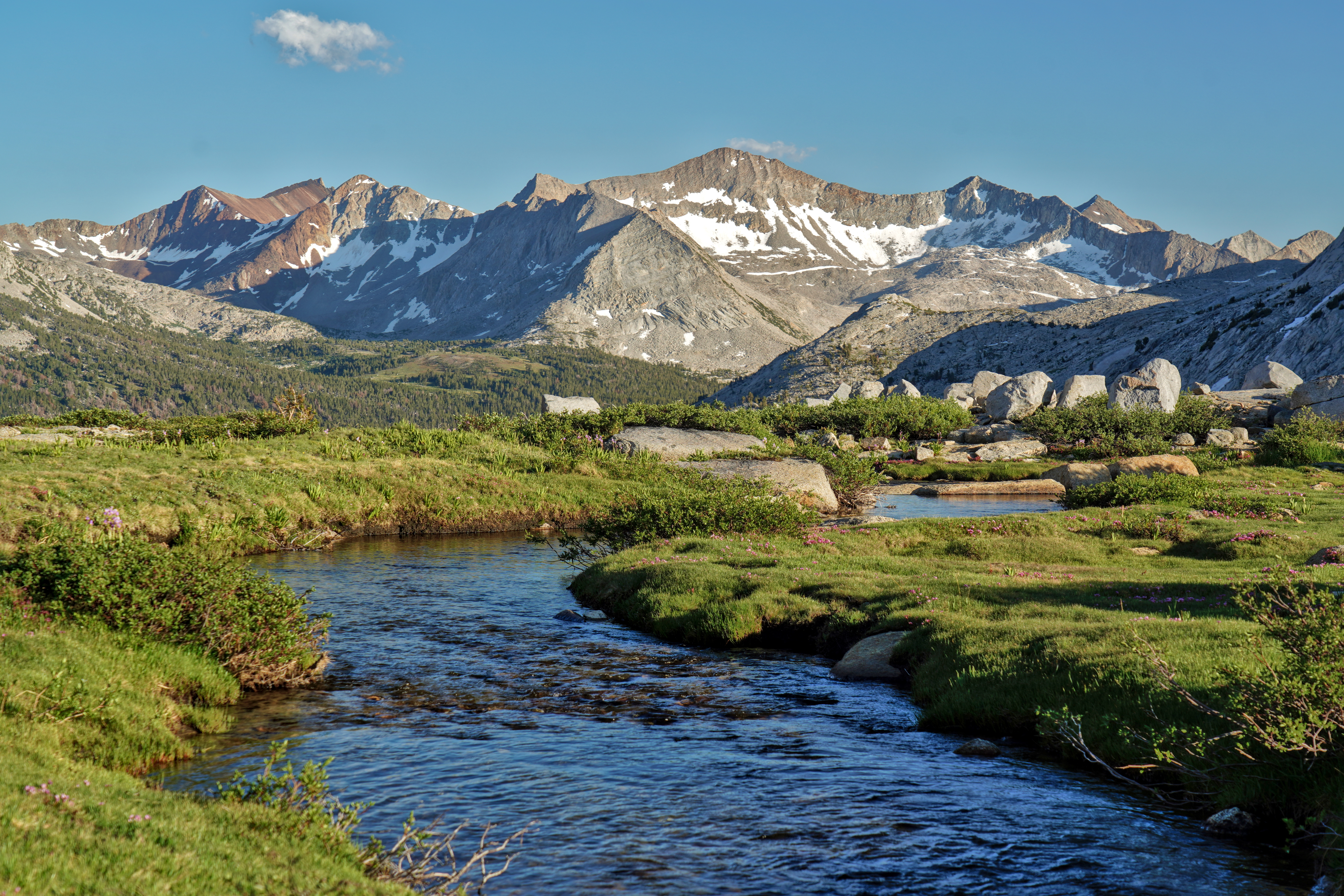
North aspect

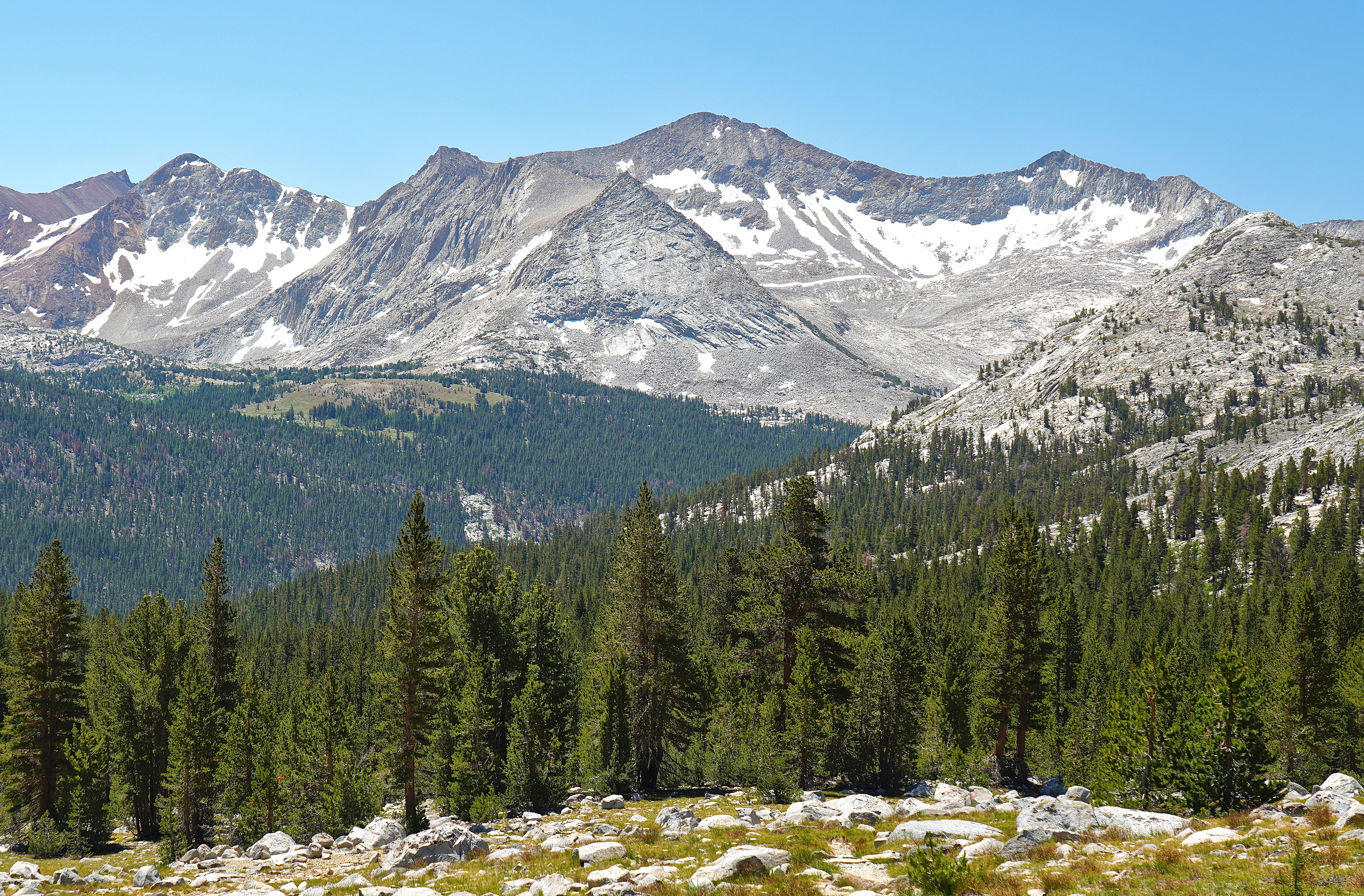

== See also ==
- List of mountain peaks of California
