= Mount Cedric Wright =

Mountain in California, United States

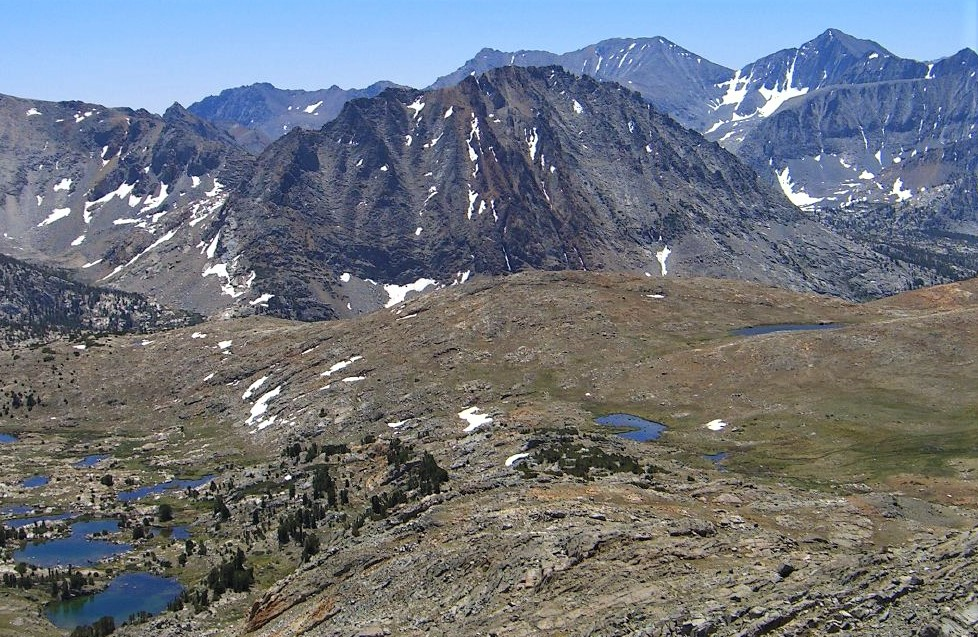
- North-northwest aspect, from Pinchot Pass

Highest point
- Elevation: 12,372 ft (3,771 m)
- Prominence: 722 ft (220 m)
- Parent peak: Colosseum Mountain (12,473 ft)
- Isolation: 1.17 mi (1.88 km)
- Coordinates: 36°54′15″N 118°23′16″W

Naming
- Etymology: George Cedric Wright

Geography
- Location within California Location within the United States
- Country: United States
- State: California
- County: Fresno
- Protected area: Kings Canyon National Park
- Parent range: Sierra Nevada
- Topo map: USGS Mount Pinchot

Climbing
- First ascent: 1935
- Easiest route: class 2 hiking

Mount Cedric Wright is a 12,372-foot-elevation (3,771-meter) mountain summit located one mile west of the crest of the Sierra Nevada mountain range, in Fresno County of northern California, United States. It is situated in eastern Kings Canyon National Park, 13 miles (21 km) northwest of the community of Independence, 2.2 miles (3.5 km) southeast of Crater Mountain, and 2.5 miles (4.0 km) south-southeast of Mount Wynne and Pinchot Pass. Topographic relief is significant as the west aspect rises nearly 2,000 feet (610 meters) above the surrounding terrain in approximately one mile. The John Muir Trail traverses below the west aspect of this remote peak. The first ascent was made August 25, 1935, by Norman Clyde.

== Etymology ==
The peak's name commemorates George Cedric Wright (1889–1959), an internationally known wilderness photographer of the Sierra Nevada, and Ansel Adams's mentor and close friend. The mountain's name was officially adopted in 1961 by the United States Board on Geographic Names. Park ranger Randy Morgenson scattered Wright's ashes on the slopes of his namesake mountain.

== Climate ==
According to the Köppen climate classification system, Mount Cedric Wright is located in an alpine climate zone. Most weather fronts originate in the Pacific Ocean, and travel east toward the Sierra Nevada mountains. As fronts approach, they are forced upward by the peaks, causing them to drop their moisture in the form of rain or snowfall onto the range (orographic lift). Precipitation runoff from the mountain drains into Woods Creek, a tributary of the South Fork Kings River.

== See also ==
- List of mountain peaks of California
