= Pinchot Pass =

Mountain pass in the Sierra Nevada, California

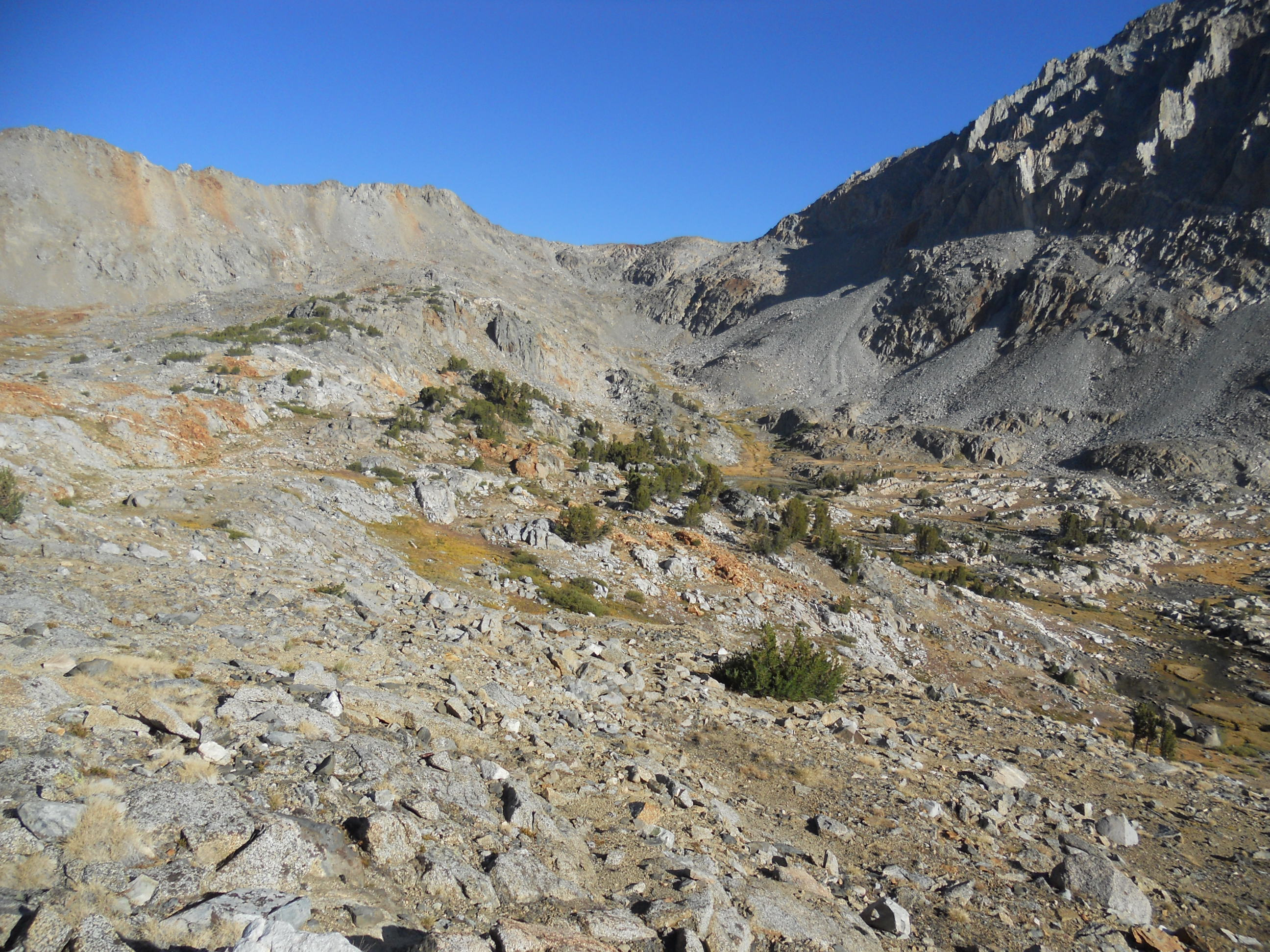
- Pinchot Pass (center) viewed from the south, on the John Muir Trail. Mount Wynne is visible to the right.

- Location within California
- Elevation: 12,090 ft (3,690 m)
- Traversed by: John Muir Trail, Pacific Crest Trail

Third Approach
- Location: Fresno County, California, United States
- Range: Sierra Nevada
- Coordinates: 36°56′11″N 118°24′45″W
- Topo map: USGS Mount Pinchot

Pinchot Pass is a high mountain pass in the Sierra Nevada mountain range of California, in the United States. It lies within far eastern Fresno County, inside Kings Canyon National Park and the Sequoia-Kings Canyon Wilderness.

Pinchot Pass sits at an elevation of 12,090 feet (3,685 m), running roughly from east to west, situated between 12,874-foot Crater Mountain to the southwest and 13,179-foot Mount Wynne directly to the east. The pass separates a lakes basin that includes Marjorie Lake to the north, and the Woods Creek drainage (a major tributary of the South Fork Kings River) to the south. The seasonally-staffed Bench Lake ranger station is just over 2 miles to the north of the pass, near the trail turnoff from the John Muir Trail to Taboose Pass.

The pass is traversed by the John Muir Trail and the Pacific Crest Trail, which are coincident (sharing the same route) between Crabtree Meadows and Tuolumne Meadows. It is one of the six high mountain passes above 11,000 feet on the John Muir Trail, along with Donohue Pass, Muir Pass, Mather Pass, Glen Pass, and Forester Pass; it is south of Mather Pass and north of Glen Pass.

== Naming ==
Pinchot Pass was named for Gifford Pinchot, fourth chief of the U.S. Division of Forestry from 1898 to 1905 and first head of the United States Forest Service (USFS) from 1905 to 1910. It and the nearby Mount Pinchot were named by Joseph Nisbet LeConte, a noted mountaineer, photographer, and cartographer of the Sierra Nevada, in 1903.

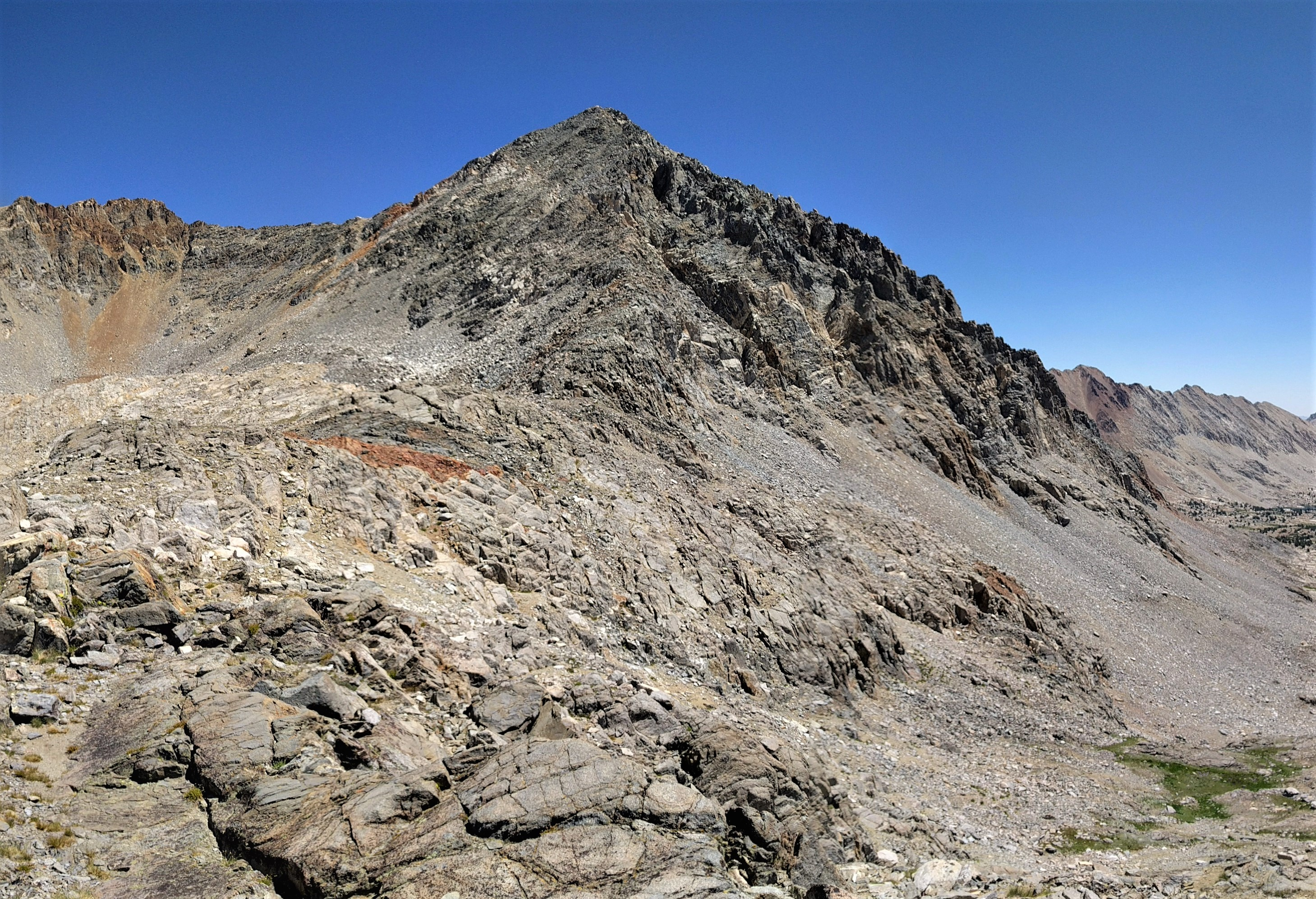
View from atop Pinchot Pass, looking west at Mount Wynne

== Gallery of nearby peaks ==
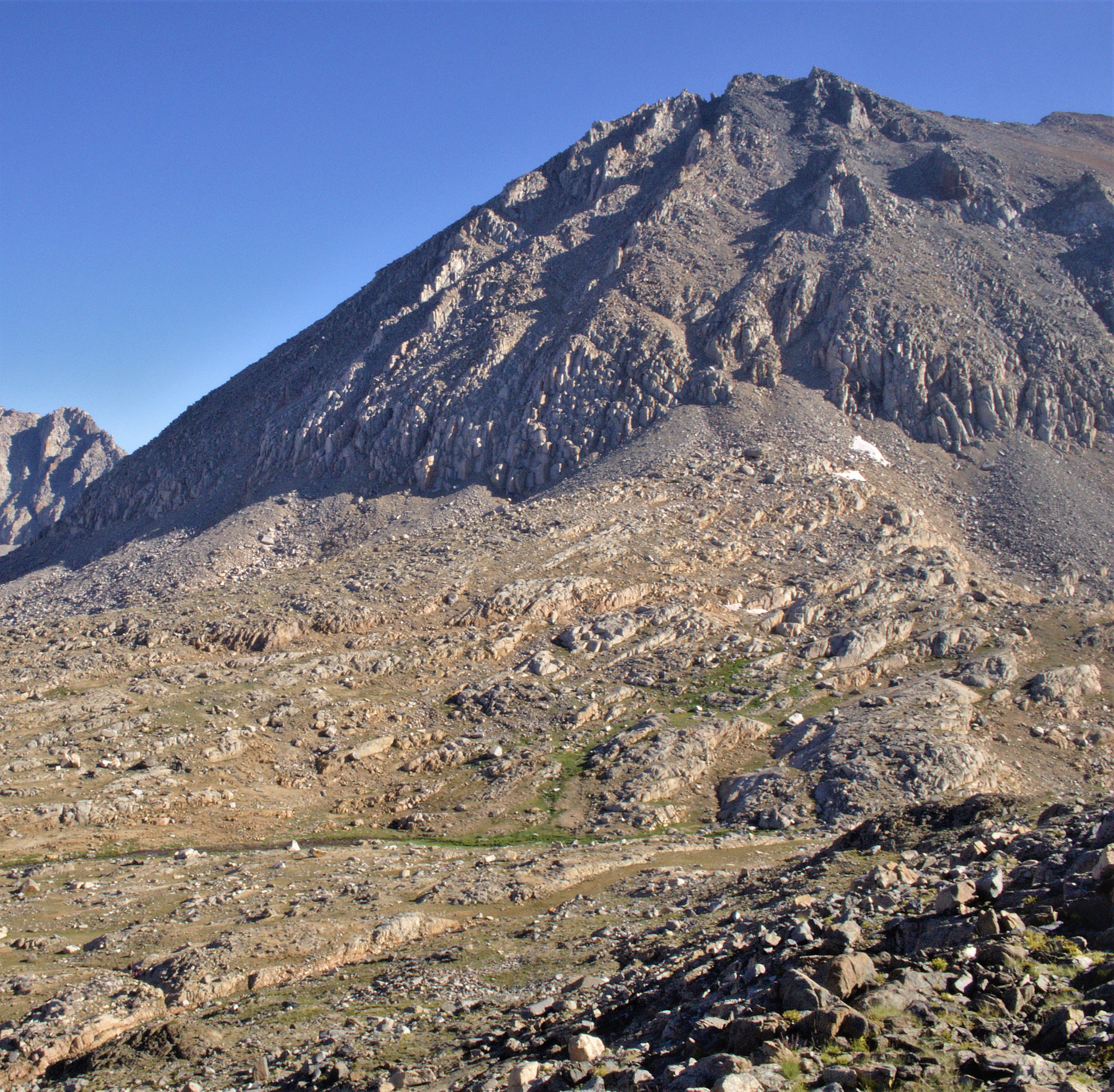
Mount Pinchot, viewed from north of Pinchot Pass

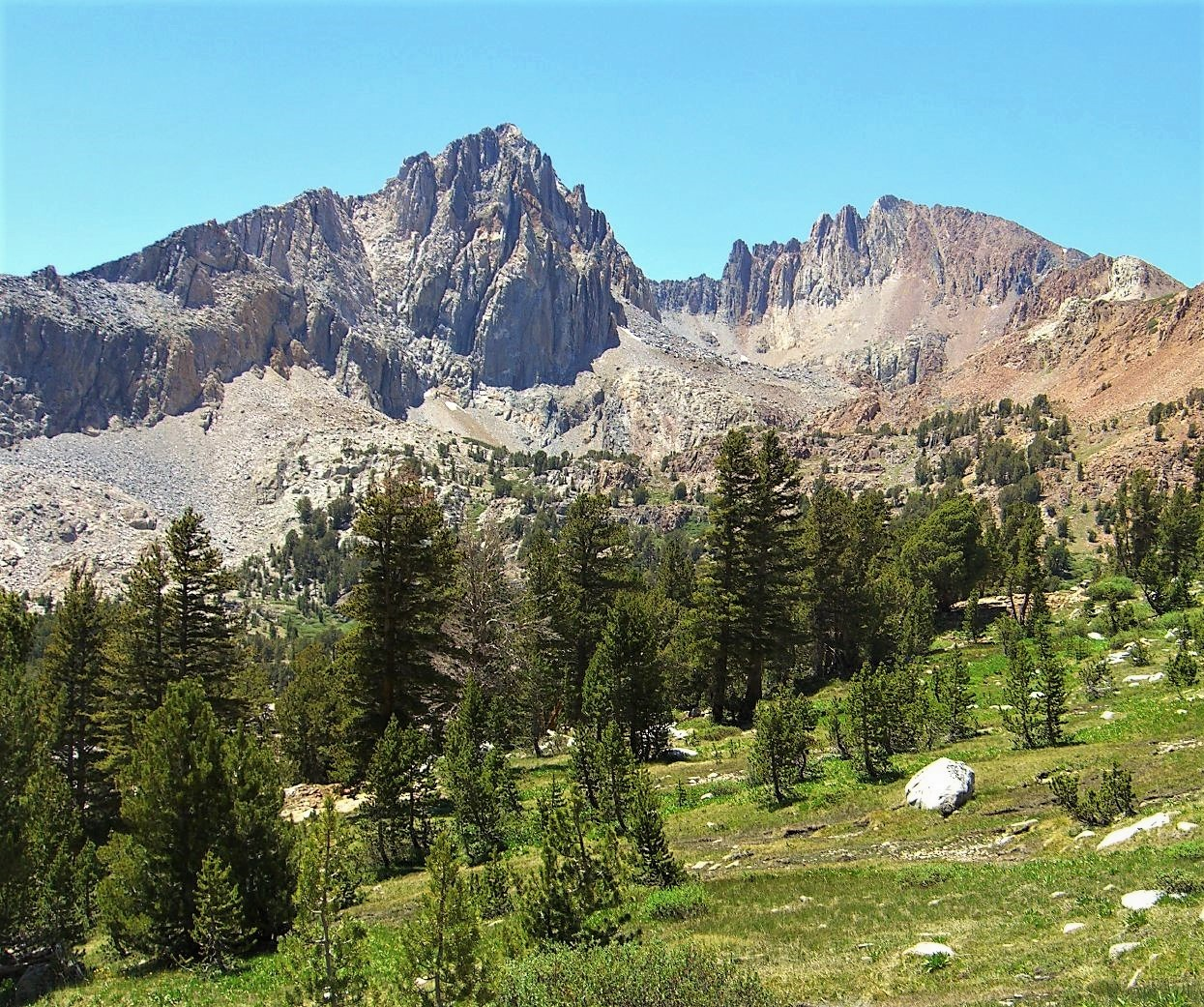
Crater Mountain, viewed from south of Pinchot Pass

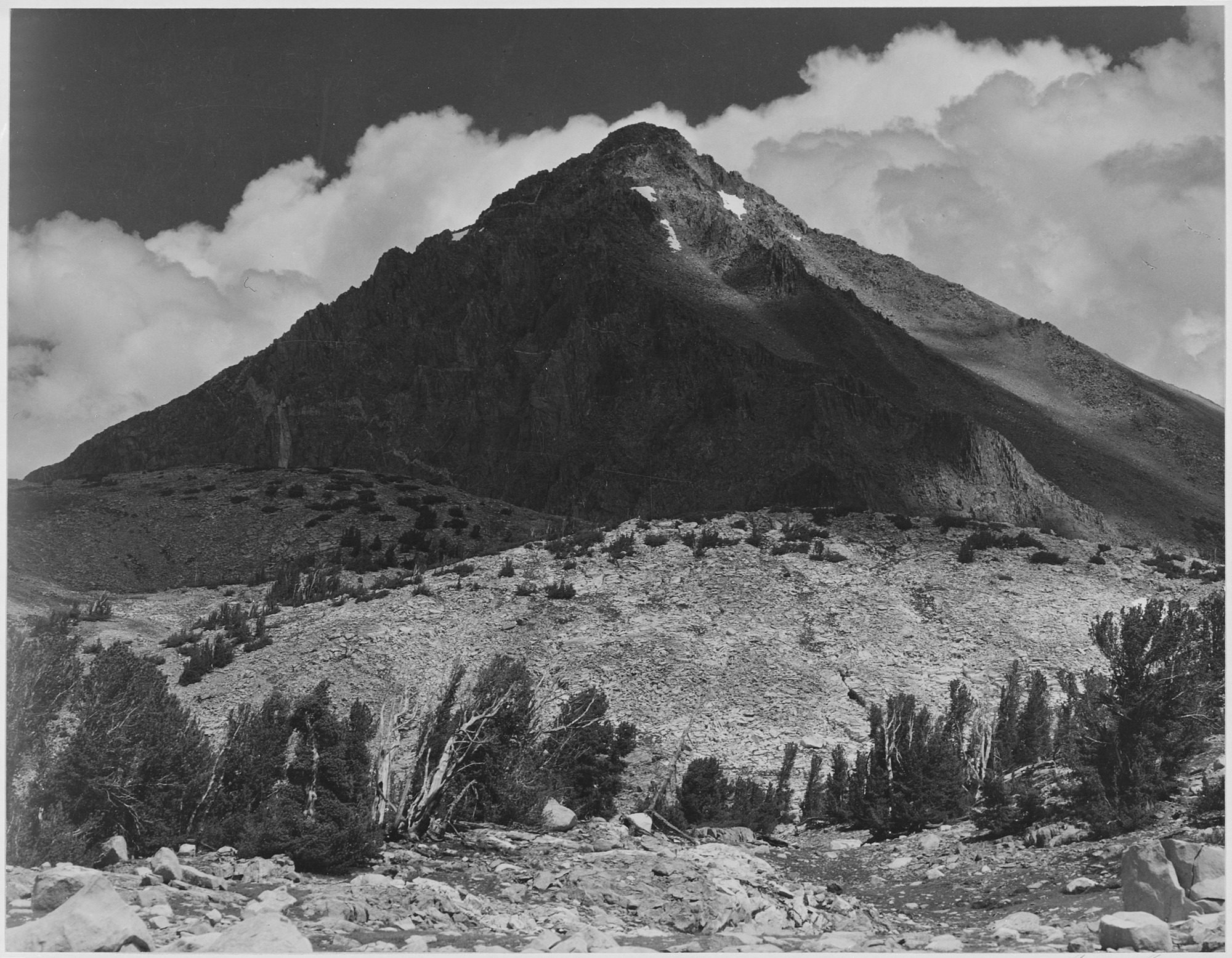
Mount Wynne, viewed from south of Pinchot Pass, by Ansel Adams

== See also ==
Other nearby peaks include:

- Mount Ickes
- Mount Perkins
- Mount Cedric Wright
