= Crater Mountain (California) =

Mountain in the American state of California

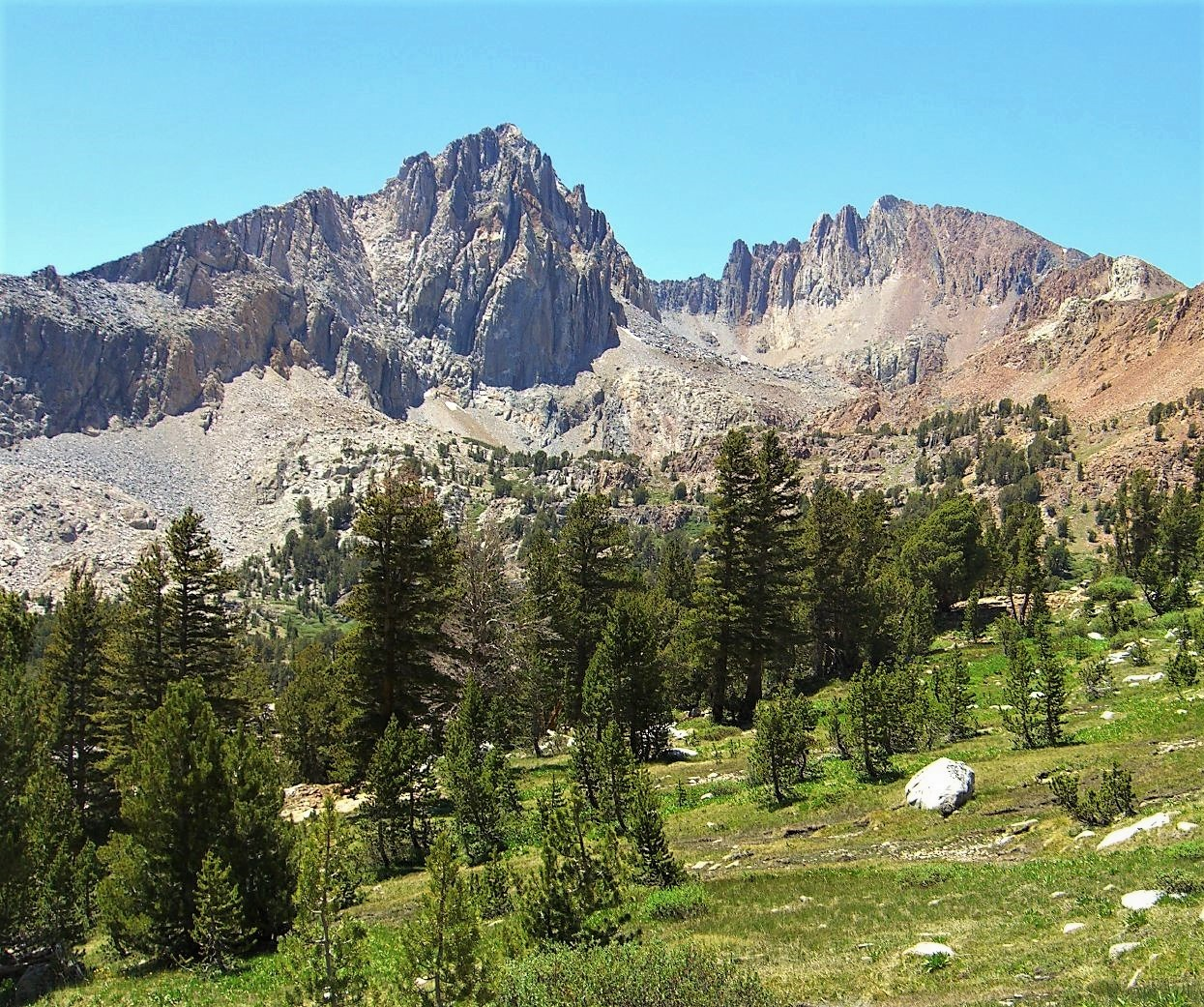
- East aspect, from John Muir Trail

Highest point
- Elevation: 12,874 ft (3,924 m)
- Prominence: 637 ft (194 m)
- Parent peak: Mount Ickes (12,959 ft)
- Isolation: 1.26 mi (2.03 km)
- Coordinates: 36°55′21″N 118°25′16″W

Geography
- Location within California Location within the United States
- Country: United States
- State: California
- County: Fresno
- Protected area: Kings Canyon National Park
- Parent range: Sierra Nevada
- Topo map: USGS Mount Pinchot

Geology
- Rock type: metamorphic

Climbing
- First ascent: 1922
- Easiest route: class 2 from east or northeast

Crater Mountain is a 12,874-foot-elevation (3,924-meter) mountain summit located west of the crest of the Sierra Nevada mountain range, in Fresno County of northern California, United States. It is situated in eastern Kings Canyon National Park, 15.5 miles (24.9 km) northwest of the community of Independence, one mile immediately southwest of Pinchot Pass, and 1.3 miles (2.1 km) southeast of Mount Ickes, which is the nearest higher neighbor. Other nearby peaks include Mount Wynne, 1.5 miles (2.4 km) to the northeast, and Mount Cedric Wright, 2.2 miles (3.5 km) to the southeast. Crater Mountain ranks as the 186th highest summit in California. Topographic relief is significant, as the west aspect rises 2,000 feet (610 meters) in less than one mile. The approach to this remote peak is made via the John Muir Trail, which passes below the east aspect of the mountain. The first ascent of the summit was made July 19, 1922, by W. H. Ink, Meyers Butte, Frank Baxter, and Captain Wallace. This mountain has no crater as the name implies.

== Climate ==
According to the Köppen climate classification system, Crater Mountain is located in an alpine climate zone. Most weather fronts originate in the Pacific Ocean, and travel east toward the Sierra Nevada mountains. As fronts approach, they are forced upward by the peaks, causing them to drop their moisture in the form of rain or snowfall onto the range (orographic lift). Precipitation runoff from the mountain drains to Woods Creek, which is a tributary of the South Fork Kings River.

== Gallery ==
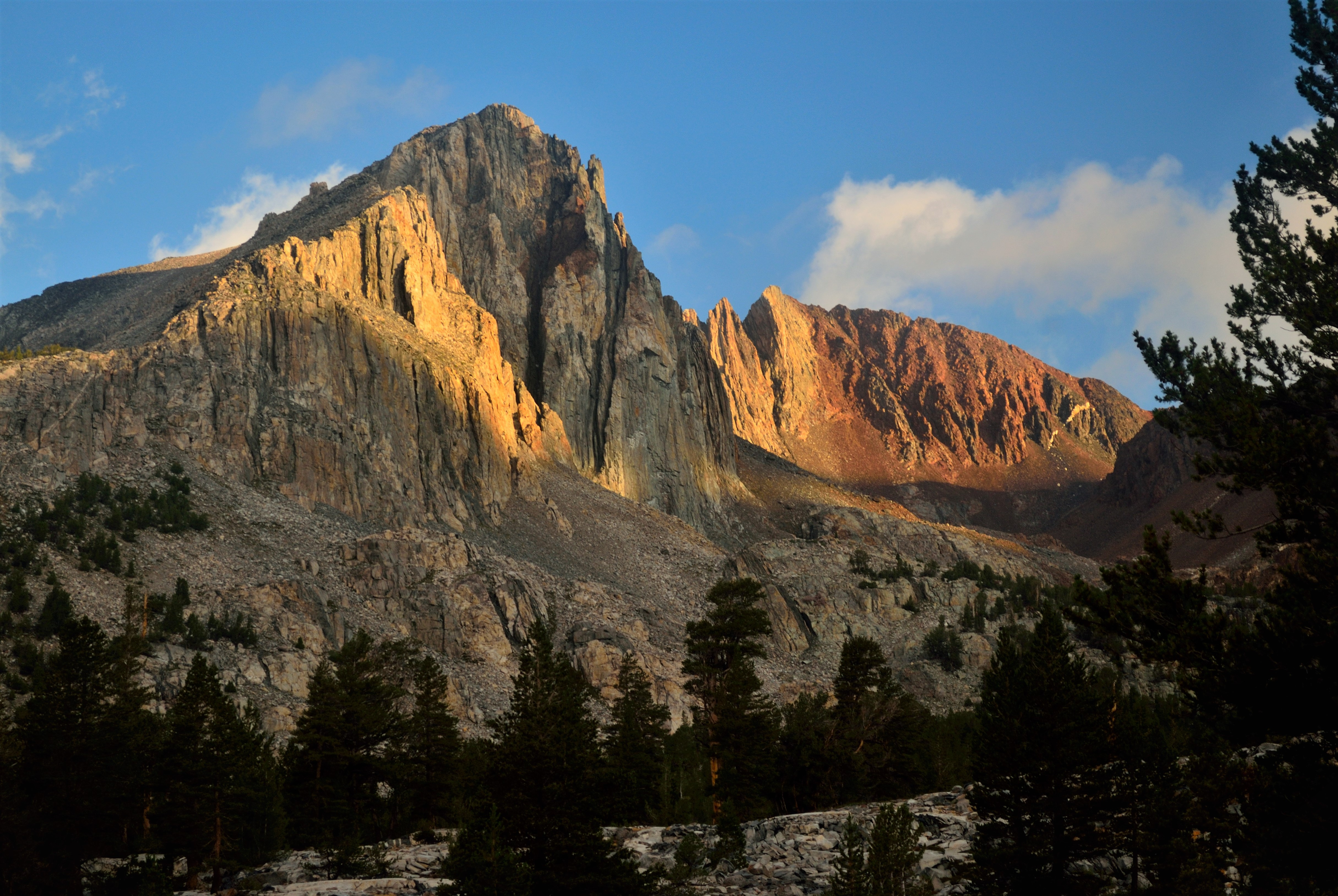
Crater Mountain from ESE

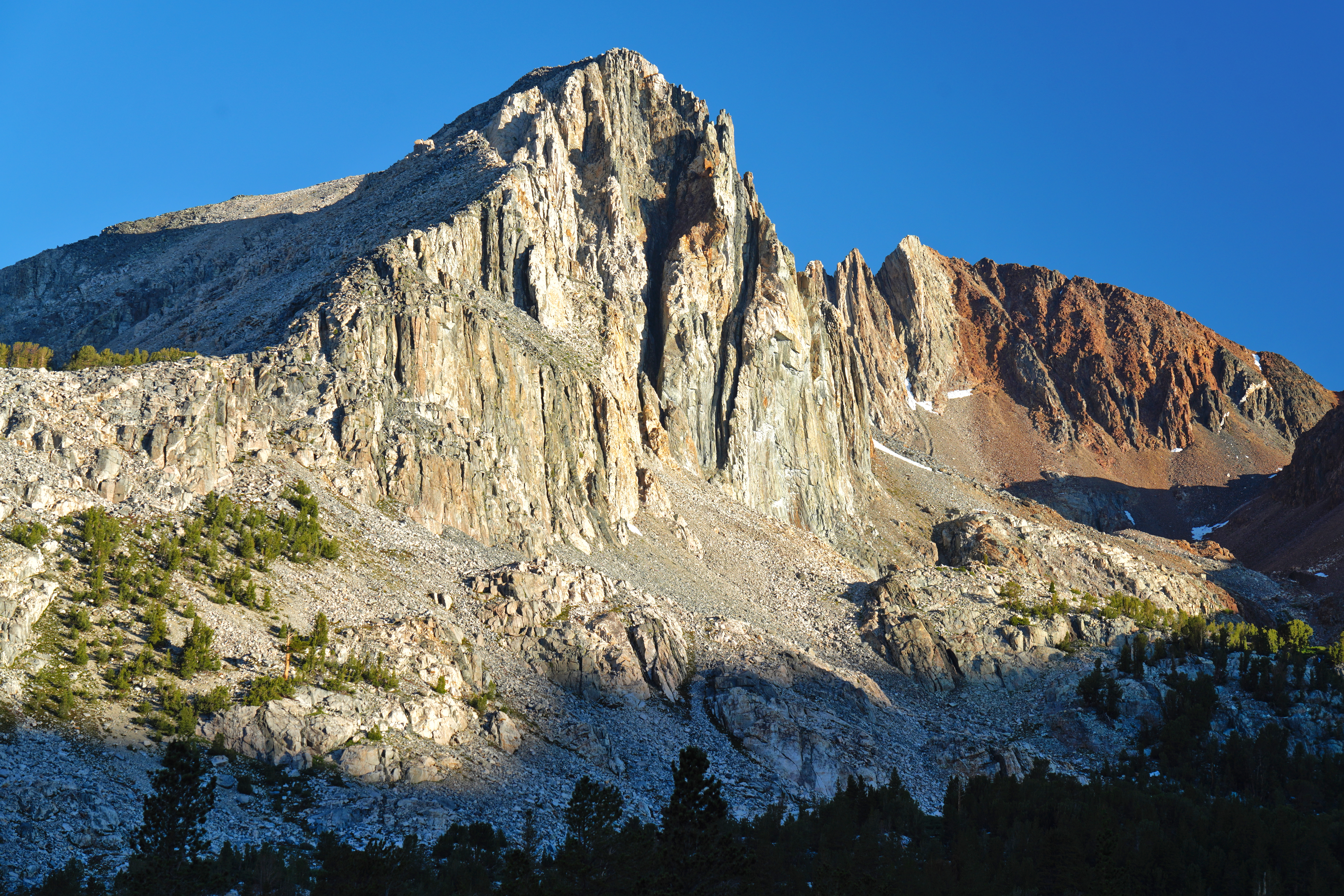

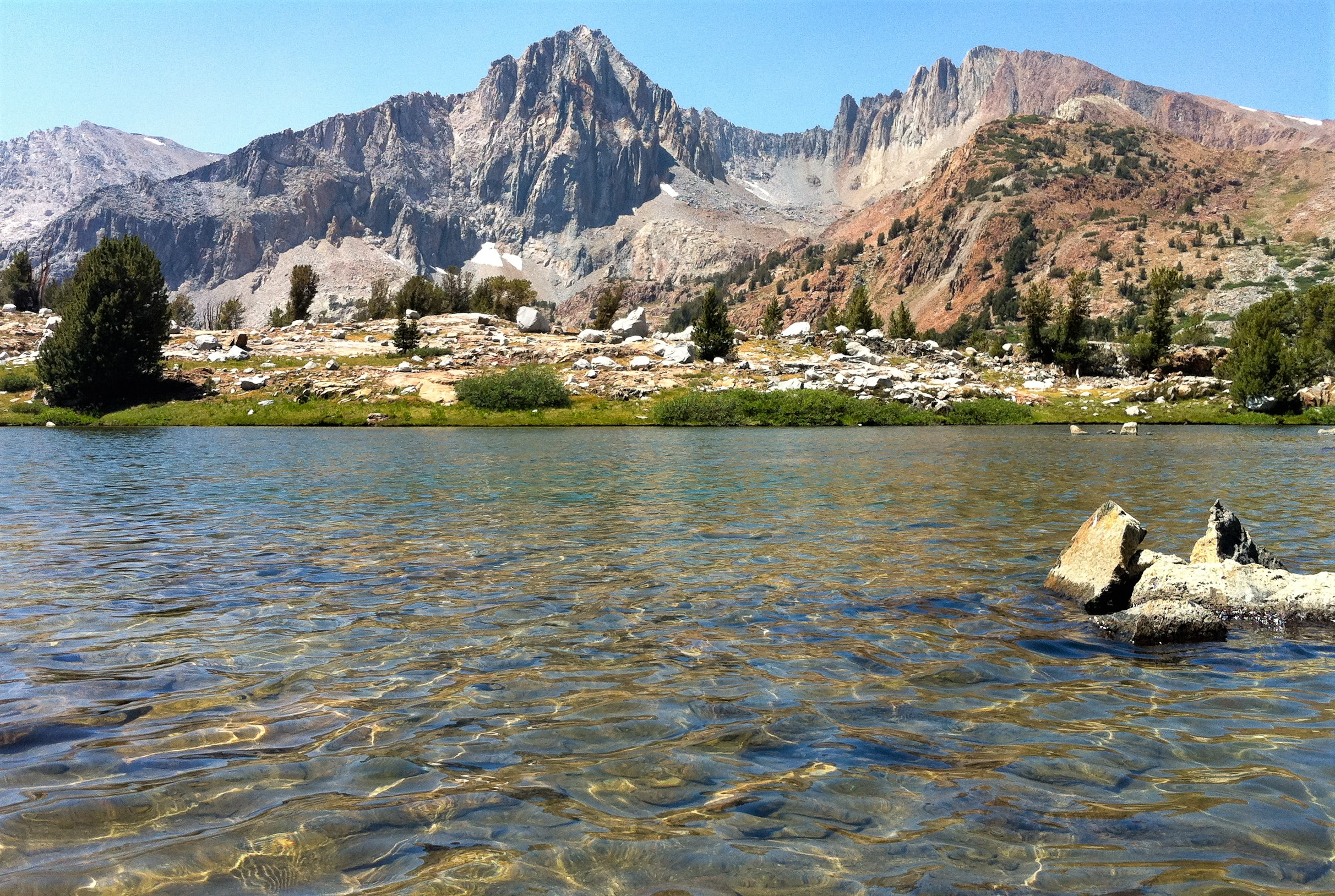

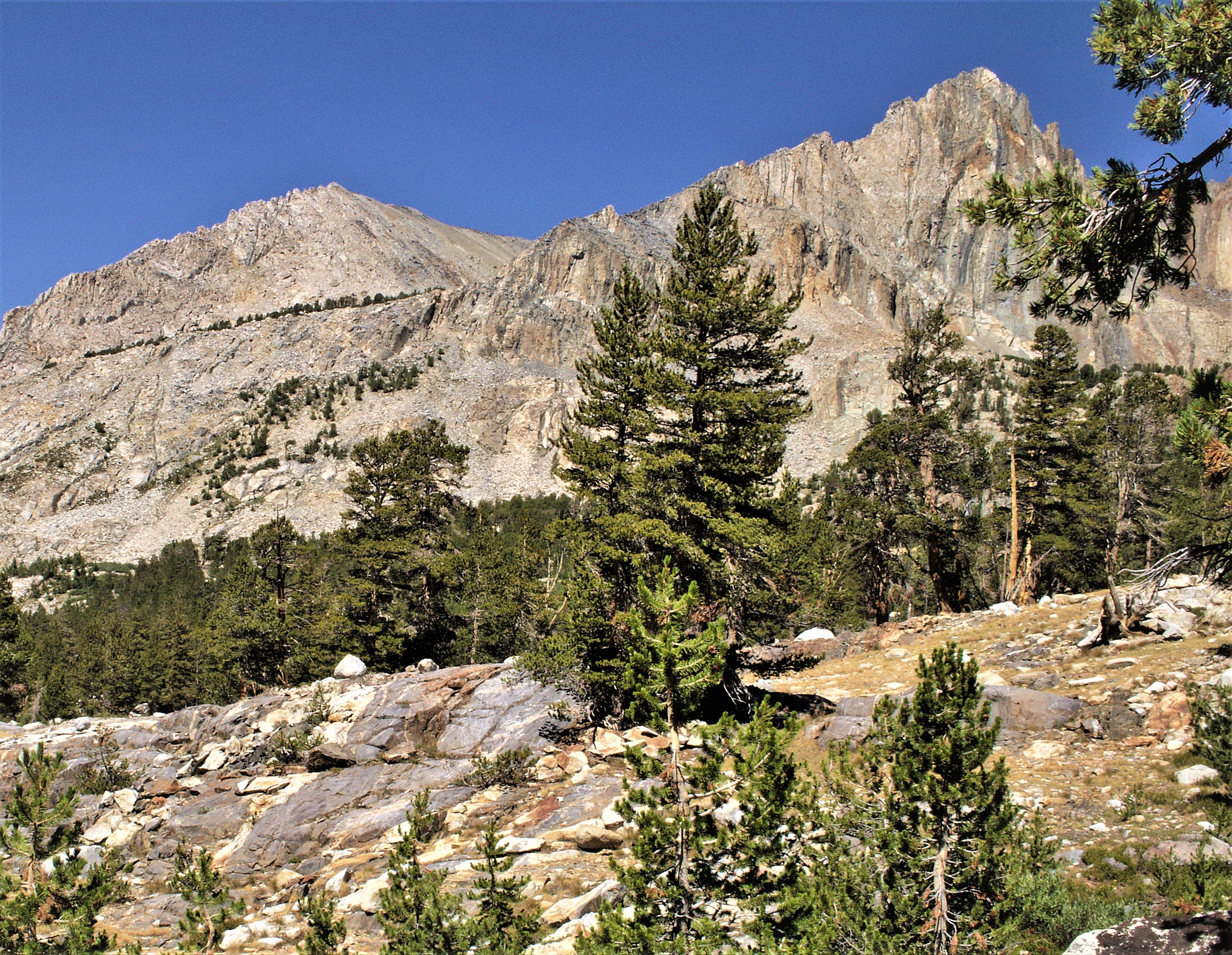

== See also ==
- List of mountain peaks of California
