= William Edward Colby =

American lawyer and conservationist

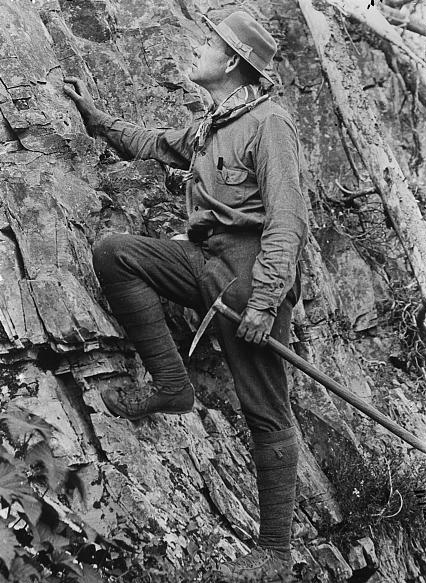
- Born: May 28, 1875; Benicia, California
- Died: November 9, 1964 (aged 89); Big Sur, California
- Occupations: Lawyer, conservationist
- Known for: First Secretary of the Sierra Club

William Edward Colby (May 28, 1875 – November 9, 1964) was an American lawyer, conservationist, and the first Secretary of the Sierra Club.

== Early life and education ==
William Colby was born in Benicia, California and was brought up by his aunt after being orphaned at the age of six. He received his law degree from Hastings College of the Law in San Francisco, and his legal practice specialized in forestry and mining issues. In 1937, he received an Honorary Degree from Mills College, then a women's college, in Oakland, California.

== Colby and the Sierra Club ==
Colby joined the Sierra Club in 1898, the year of his graduation from law school. He served as the club's representative in the Yosemite Valley area. In 1900, he became the club's secretary, and served (bar two years) in that post until 1946. He also served as a director of the club for 49 years.

Colby was a pioneer in the Sierra Club's outing program, and led his High Trips to the Yosemite area from 1901 to 1929; he also led the 1928 High Trip to the Canadian Rockies, and at the end of that trip was given a heartfelt fireside tribute by his fellow hikers, who included 26-year-old photographer Ansel Adams. Colby joined Sierra Club founder John Muir in lobbying the U.S. Federal authorities to protect the Yosemite Valley, by the creation of the Yosemite National Park.

In 1905, when the city of San Francisco lobbied Congress to allow it to dam the Hetch Hetchy Valley to provide the growing city with water, Muir and Colby were leaders of the campaign to prevent the damming of the Tuolumne River and the flooding of the valley. Colby called the valley "the indispensable entrance and exit to the Grand Canyon of the Tuolumne, next to the Canyon of the Colorado, the most wonderful gorge in America.".

In 1927, when the California Legislature established the State Park Commission, Colby was its first Secretary. Other members of the State Park Commission included: Major Frederick R. Burnham, W. F. Chandler, Henry W. O'Melveny, and Dr. Ray Lyman Wilbur.

Colby wrote the introduction for Muir's book, Studies in the Sierra.

Colby's other campaigns led to the expansion of the Sequoia National Park and the creation of Olympic National Park and the Kings Canyon National Park.

In 1960, he was the first winner of the Sierra Club John Muir Award. He was a trustee of the Sierra Club Foundation from 1960 until his death.

Colby died at home in Big Sur, California on November 9, 1964. In 1965, the Sierra Club re-dedicated the reading room and library in its San Francisco headquarters as the William E. Colby Memorial Library. The Sierra Club annually awards the William E. Colby Award to those it feels have given great service to the environment.
