= High Trips =

Former series of annual excursions of the Sierra Club

The High Trips were large annual wilderness excursions organized and led by the Sierra Club, beginning in 1901. The High Trips lasted until the early 1970s, and were replaced by a larger number of smaller trips to wilderness areas worldwide.

== Origin ==
Sierra Club secretary William Colby initiated the High Trips, which usually traveled to the High Sierra, and led them from 1901 to 1929. Colby wrote, "It was from John Muir, President of the Club, that I received the warmest encouragement. He was highly enthusiastic, and told me that he had long been trying to get the Club to undertake just such outings." Edward T. Parsons, a former member of The Mazamas, an Oregon mountaineering club, was also involved with the early logistics, as that club had conducted similar trips. Early outings lasted four full weeks, but eventually the trips were separated into two segments of two weeks each so that those with less time to spare could participate.

Francis Farquhar wrote that the purpose of the High Trips was far more than to provide an enjoyable vacation to the participants, but also to "lead them to know and appreciate the beauty and inspiration of the mountains, and to educate them to become defenders of the wilderness."

The first High Trip in July, 1901 attracted 96 club members to Yosemite National Park. On the eve of the start of the trip, club co-founder and University of California, Berkeley geology professor Joseph LeConte died of a sudden heart attack in Yosemite Valley at age 78. Other than this sad event, the trip was a success, and the Sierra Club then began a successful fundraising drive to build LeConte Memorial Lodge in Yosemite Valley in his honor. The High Trip the next and subsequent years doubled in size.

== Logistics ==
The high trips were complex affairs, with gear for approximately 200 participants packed in by mules, with a staff of up to 50 and elaborate food prepared by professional cooks. It served to establish rituals and folklore that bound the members of the club together. Participants wore bandannas around their necks, used the distinctive metal Sierra Club cup, and sang the same campfire songs year after year. When the Sierra Club was lobbying for the establishment of Kings Canyon National Park, the High Trips visited that area many times, so that more effective lobbyists for the park could become familiar with its remote beauty.

== Destinations and mountaineering ==
Although most of the High Trips were in the Sierra Nevada, occasionally trips were scheduled to other mountain ranges of western North America, including Mount Rainier in 1905, Glacier National Park, Yellowstone National Park, and the Canadian Rockies in 1928.

The July 1928 trip to the Canadian Rockies was a joint venture with The Mazamas of Oregon, and The Mountaineers of the state of Washington. A train was chartered from Oakland to Jasper Park Lodge. During this trip, participants climbed many peaks, including Redoubt Mountain, Mount Robson, Mount Edith Cavell, Mount Geikie, Mount Bastion, Mount Barbican and Drawbridge Mountain. Norman Clyde served as a mountaineering guide, and Ansel Adams was the official photographer (on later trips, he would also serve as assistant manager and director of evening entertainment). Adams produced photo portfolios documenting the High Trips of 1928, 1929, 1930 and 1932 (though he did not participate personally in the 1929 High Trip to Yellowstone). These portfolios he sold at cost to High Trip participants.

Mountaineering was a major element of the High Trips from the very beginning, although non-climbers, dubbed "meadoweers," were also welcome. Francis Farquhar wrote that "Greatest of all mountaineers who have participated in Sierra Club outings is Norman Clyde," who led many High Trip climbs from the 1920s to 1941.

David Brower managed the High Trips from 1947 to 1954, and wrote an article for National Geographic in 1954 that brought great publicity to the trips.

== Legacy ==
Gradually, the large annual High Trip was supplemented by smaller knapsacking and burro trips. Scaled down High Trips continued into the early 1970s. Eventually, the club concluded that High Trips of over 200 participants had too great an environmental impact on fragile wilderness areas, and the High Trips evolved into the current outings program, consisting of a much larger number of much smaller trips. The Sierra Club now conducts approximately 60 foreign trips each year, as well as several hundred trips throughout the United States through its National Outings program. Local chapters organize thousands of similar trips each year.
