= Mount Wynne =

Mountain in Fresno County, California, U.S.

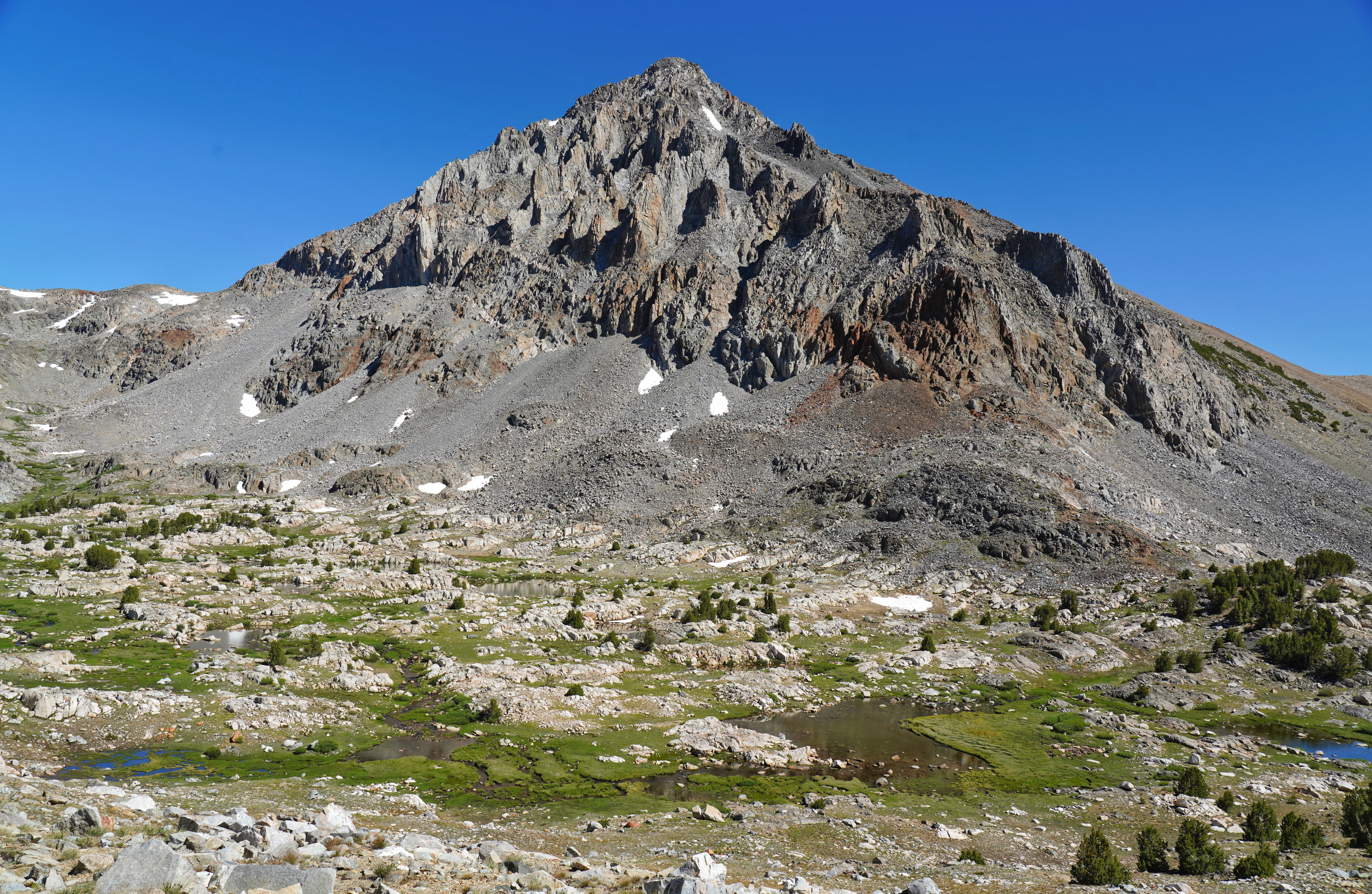
- South aspect

Highest point
- Elevation: 13,179 ft (4,017 m)
- Prominence: 318 ft (97 m)
- Parent peak: Mount Pinchot
- Isolation: 0.66 mi (1.06 km)
- Listing: Sierra Peaks Section
- Coordinates: 36°56′17″N 118°24′11″W

Naming
- Etymology: Sedman W. Wynne

Geography
- Location within California Location within the United States
- Location: Kings Canyon National Park; Fresno County; California, U.S.
- Parent range: Sierra Nevada
- Topo map: USGS Mount Pinchot

Geology
- Rock type: metamorphic

Climbing
- First ascent: 1935
- Easiest route: class 2

Mount Wynne is a 13,179-foot-elevation (4,017-meter) mountain summit located one mile west of the crest of the Sierra Nevada mountain range, in Fresno County of northern California, United States. It is situated in eastern Kings Canyon National Park, 31 miles (50 km) northwest of the town of Lone Pine, 0.4 miles immediately east of Pinchot Pass, and 0.66 miles (1.06 km) south of Mount Pinchot, which is the nearest higher neighbor. Mt. Wynne ranks as the 116th highest summit in California. Topographic relief is significant as the south aspect rises nearly 2,000 feet (610 meters) above the surrounding terrain in approximately one mile. The approach to this remote peak is made via the John Muir Trail. The first ascent of the summit was made in 1935 by a Sierra Club party.

== Etymology ==
The peak's name honors Sedman Walter Wynne (1883–1922), US Forest Service supervisor of the Sequoia National Forest, who died through his official work. He was born in Butte, Montana, attended University of California, and Yale. He died of sudden heart failure at age 39 while on a field trip for the Forest Service attending a football game between University of California and University of Southern California. The mountain's toponym was officially adopted in 1932 by the United States Board on Geographic Names.

== Climate ==
According to the Köppen climate classification system, Mount Wynne is located in an alpine climate zone. Most weather fronts originate in the Pacific Ocean, and travel east toward the Sierra Nevada mountains. As fronts approach, they are forced upward by the peaks, causing them to drop their moisture in the form of rain or snowfall onto the range (orographic lift). Precipitation runoff from the mountain drains into tributaries of the South Fork Kings River.

== Gallery ==
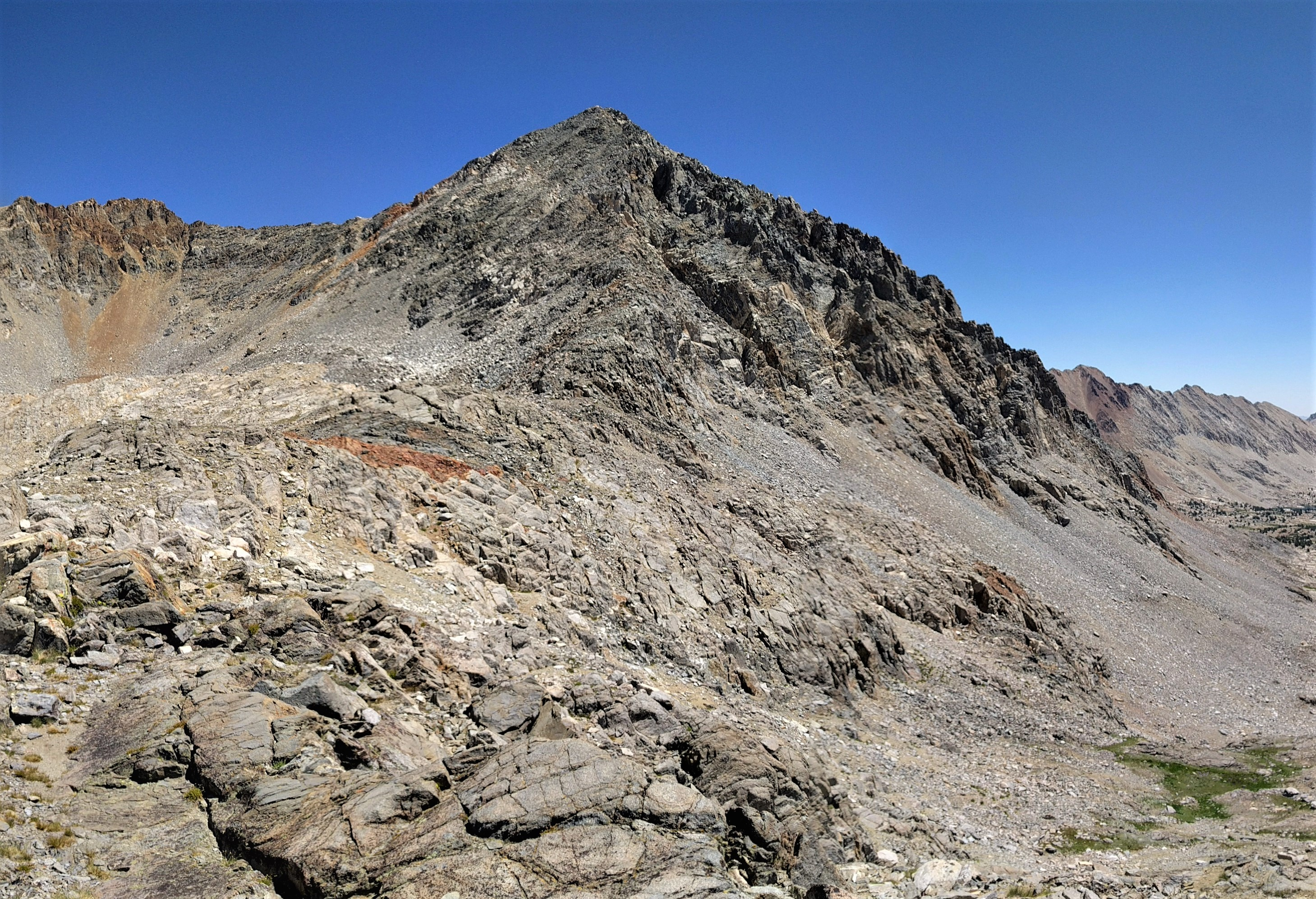
West aspect from Pinchot Pass

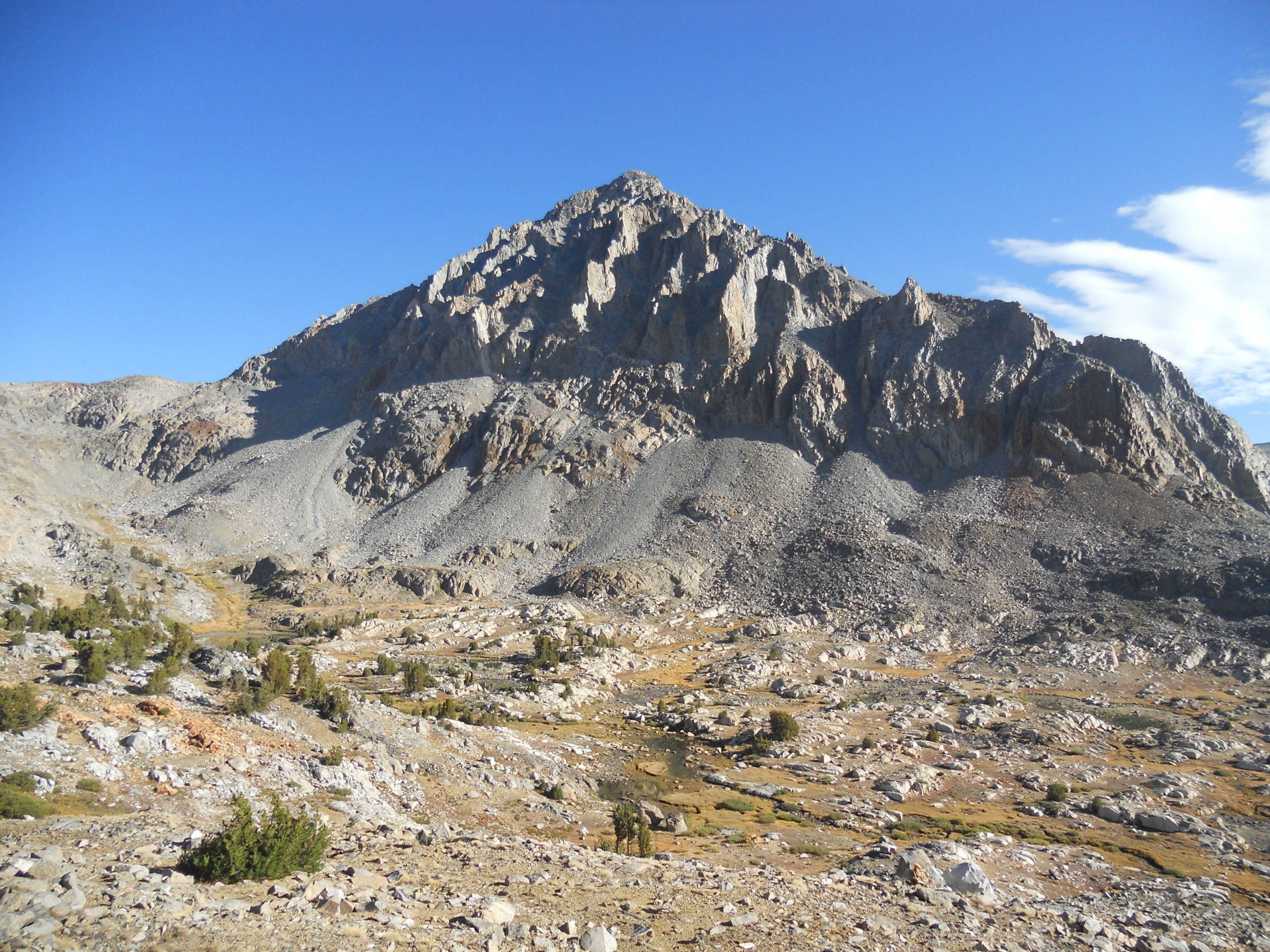
Mount Wynne viewed from the south along the John Muir Trail.

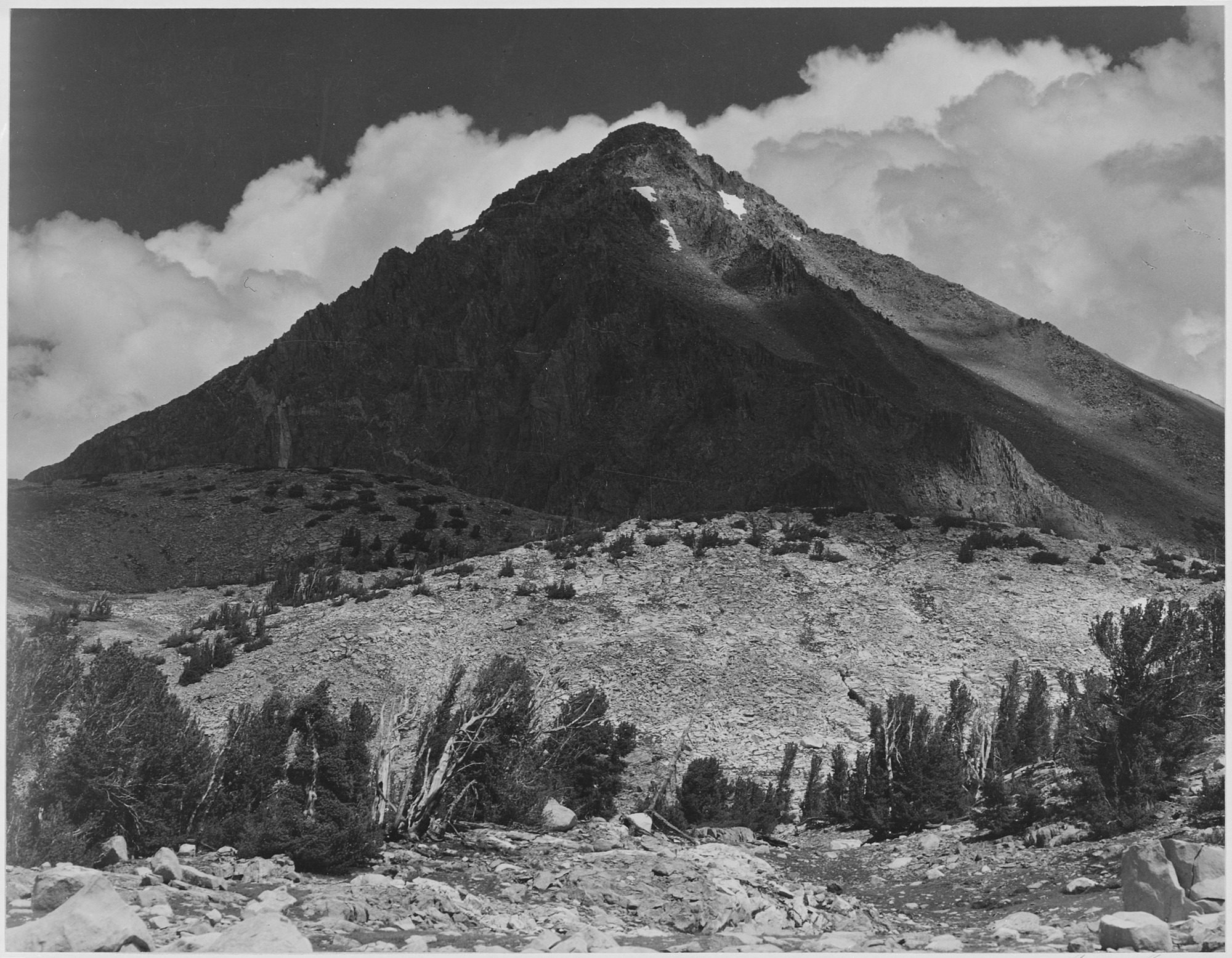
Mt. Wynne by Ansel Adams ca. 1936

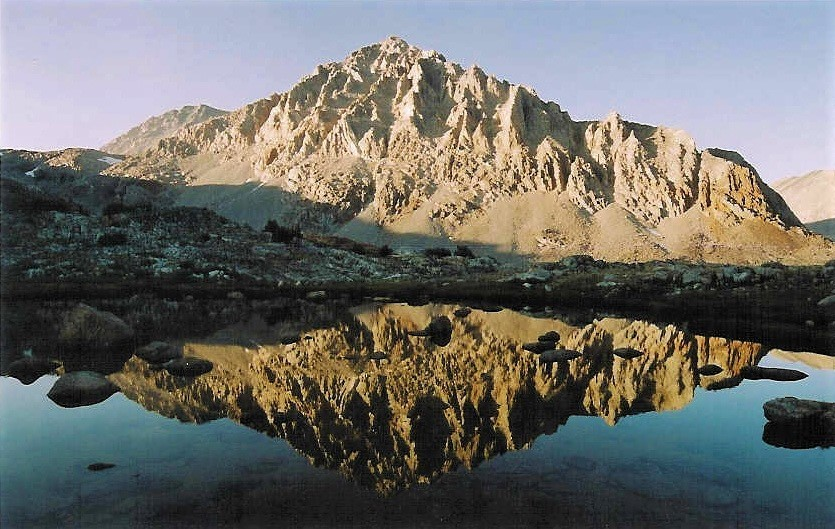
South aspect

== See also ==
- List of mountain peaks of California
