= Avalanche Pass (California) =

Mountain Pass in California

Coordinates: 36.7485497°N 118.5600981°W

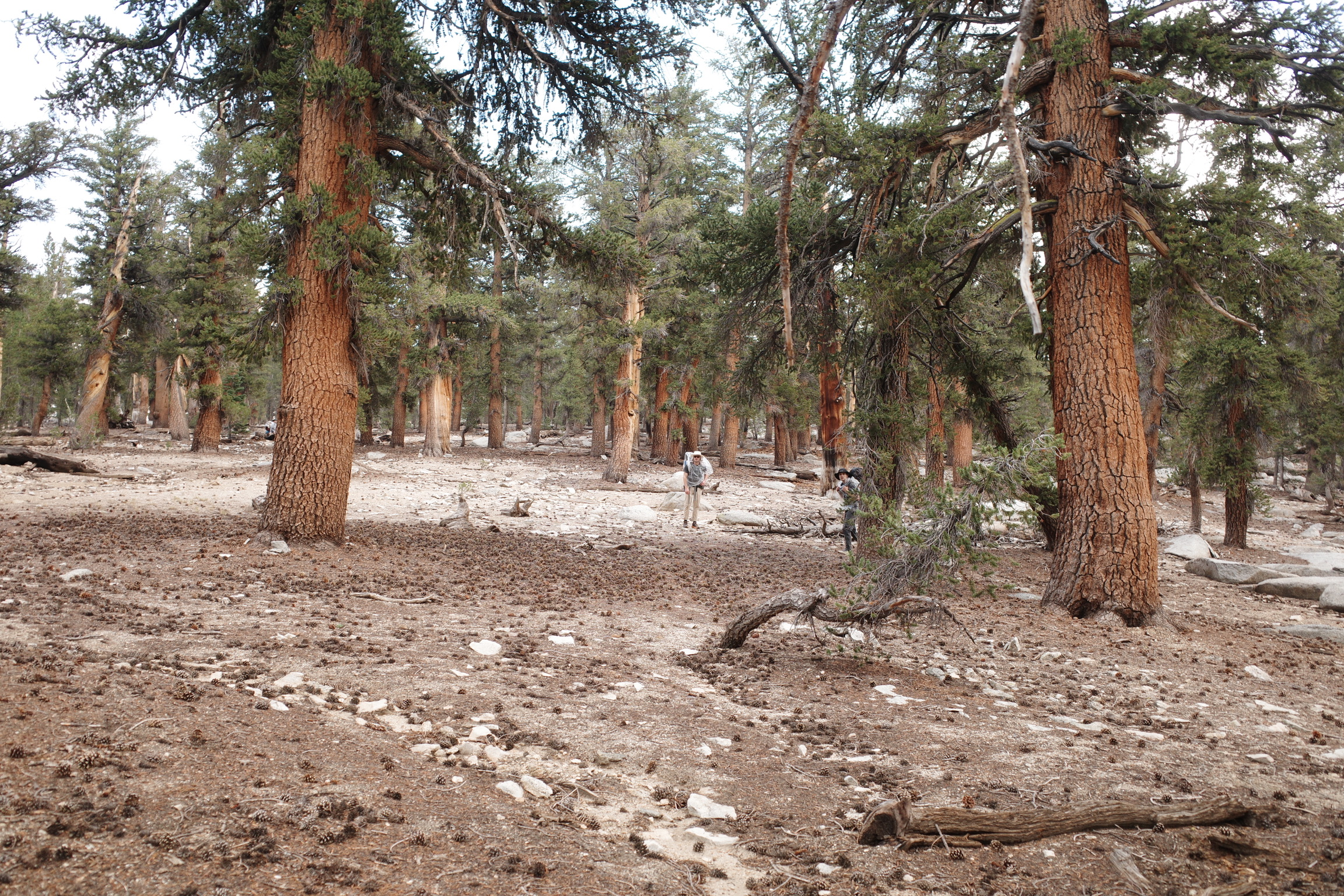
- Backpackers mingle among mature Foxtail Pine (Pinus balfouriana) on Avalanche Pass. Foxtail Pines are endemic to two disjunct areas of high mountains in the state of California. Trees like these could be over 1,000 years old. (September 4th, 2025)

- Location within California
- Elevation: 10,020 feet (3,050 m)

Third Approach
- Location: Kings Canyon National Park

Avalanche Pass is a 10,020 ft (3,050 m) high mountain pass in the Sierra Nevada mountains of Fresno County, California. It is located in Kings Canyon National Park.

== Geography ==
Avalanche Pass sits below Palmer Mountain along the lower edge of the Sphinx Crest, which separates the Roaring River and Bubbs Creek sub-watersheds of the Kings River Canyon.

In order to reach Avalanche Pass, hikers and packers must climb 5,000 ft (1,500 m) over a distance of 7 mi (11 km) from the bottom of the Kings River Canyon on the Avalanche Pass trail.

== Ecology ==
Avalanche Pass is in the Sierra Nevada subalpine zone, which occurs between 8,000 and 12,000 ft (2,400 and 3,700 m).

The pass and the surrounding high mountains are host to an extensive forest of Foxtail Pine (Pinus balfouriana), a rare endemic species of pine found in just two remote and relatively small ranges, both in the state of California. The species only occurs on poor, rocky substrates between 7,500–11,500 ft (2,300–3,500 m) in elevation. Some individuals of this species live for over 2,000 years.

They are the only species of tree in the Sierra Nevada that can survive the exceptionally harsh conditions at the cusp of the tree line.

== Climate ==
Being just above 10,000 ft (3,000 m), Avalanche Pass can receive between 25–50 ft (7.6–15.2 m) of snowfall per year, and typically has snow from October to June.

== See also ==
- Mount Brewer
- Mount Farquhar
- North Guard
