= May Lake =

May Lake or Lake May may refer to:

- May Lake (California), a lake in Yosemite National Park
- May Lake (Vancouver Island), a lake in British Columbia, Canada
- Lake May (Minnesota), a lake in Cass County
