= The Sphinx (Kings Canyon National Park) =

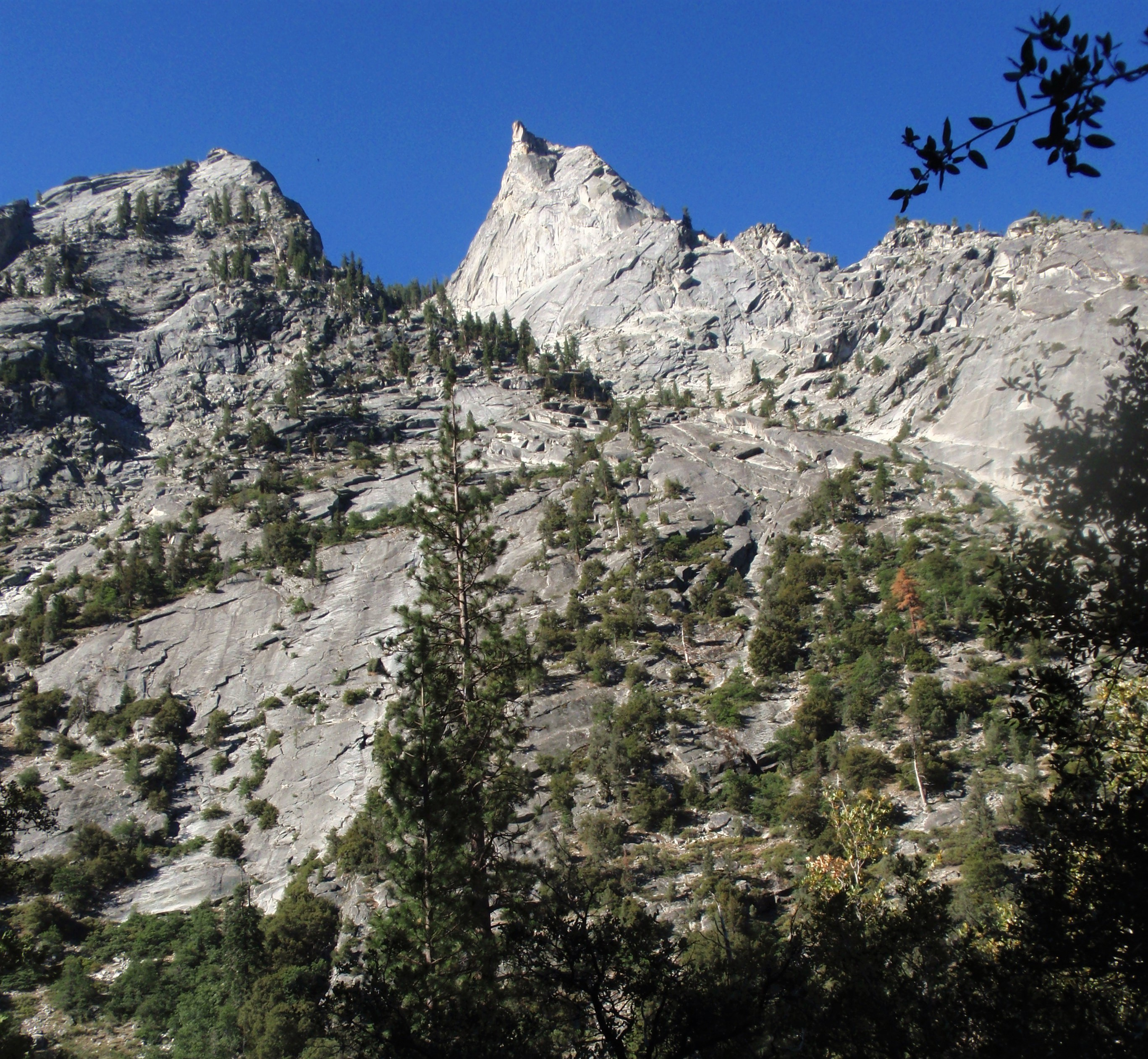

Highest point
- Elevation: 9,143 ft (2,787 m)
- Prominence: 23 ft (7.0 m)
- Parent peak: Sphinx Crest (11,580 ft)
- Isolation: 1.91 mi (3.07 km)
- Coordinates: 36°46′16″N 118°33′03″W

Naming
- Etymology: Sphinx

Geography
- Location within California Location within the United States
- Location: Kings Canyon National Park; Fresno County, California, U.S.
- Parent range: Sierra Nevada; Great Western Divide
- Topo map: USGS The Sphinx

Geology
- Rock type: granitic

Climbing
- First ascent: 1940
- Easiest route: class 5.6

The Sphinx is a 9,143-foot-elevation (2,787-meter) double summit granitic pillar located west of the crest of the Sierra Nevada mountain range, in Kings Canyon National Park, in Fresno County of northern California. This landmark is situated at the northern end of the Great Western Divide, two miles southeast of Kanawyers, five miles northwest of North Guard, and immediately south of the confluence of Bubbs Creek and South Fork Kings River. Topographic relief is significant as the north aspect rises 4,000 feet (1,200 meters) above the canyon in one mile. This geographical feature was named in 1891 by John Muir. This feature's name has been officially adopted by the United States Board on Geographic Names. The Sphinx formation is the further north and slightly lower of the two peaks, and was the first rock climb done in the Kings Canyon region. The first ascent of the summit was made July 26, 1940, by Art Argiewicz and Bob Jacobs. The North Buttress was first climbed October 18, 1970, by Fred Beckey, Greg Donaldson, and Walt Vennum.

== Climate ==
According to the Köppen climate classification system, The Sphinx is located in an alpine climate zone. Most weather fronts originate in the Pacific Ocean, and travel east toward the Sierra Nevada mountains. As fronts approach, they are forced upward by the peaks, causing them to drop their moisture in the form of rain or snowfall onto the range (orographic lift). Precipitation runoff from the peak drains into the South Fork Kings River.

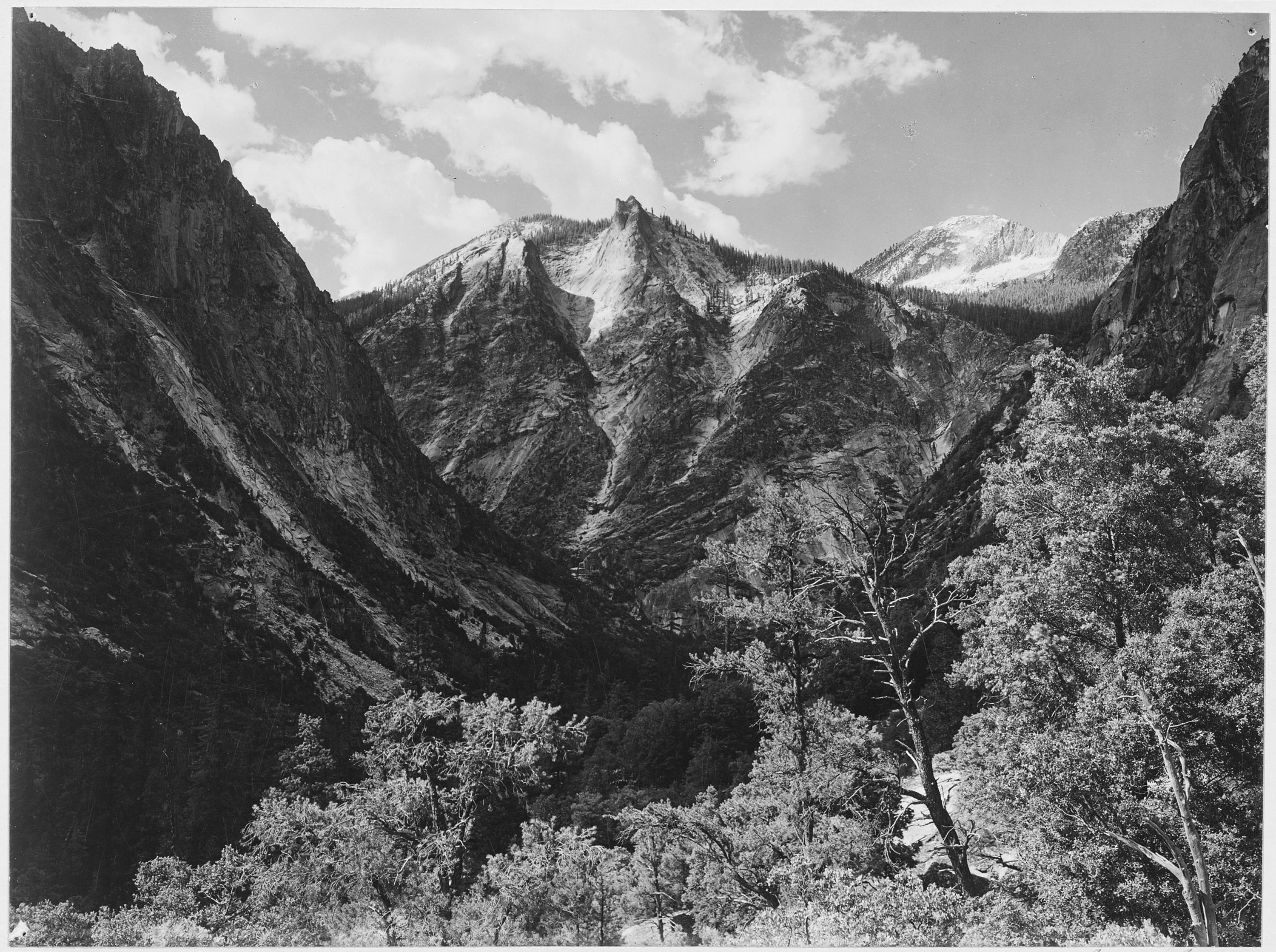
The Sphinx by Ansel Adams, circa 1941

== See also ==
- List of mountain peaks of California
- Grand Sentinel

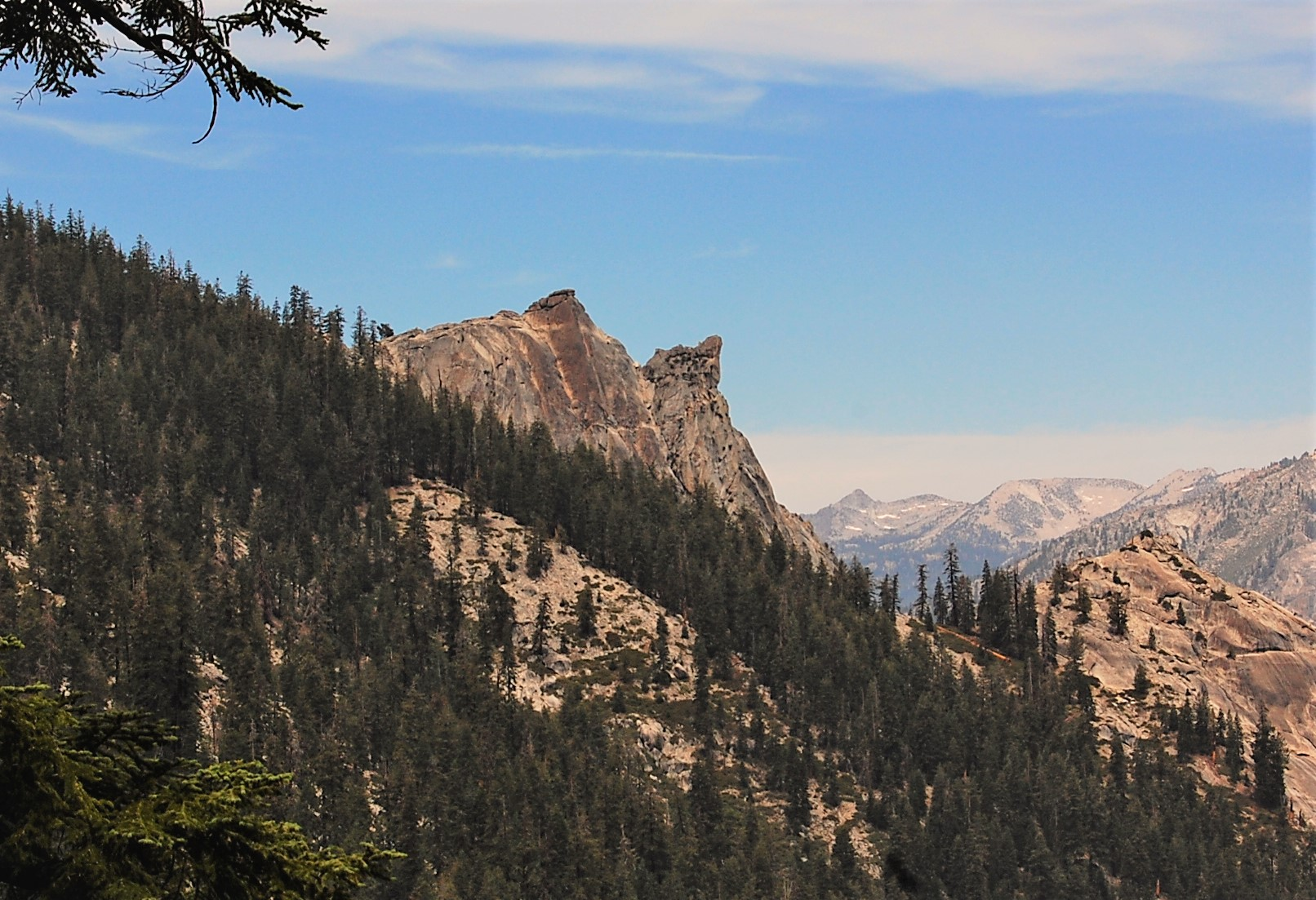
The Sphinx, east aspect
