= South Guard =

Mountain in the state of California

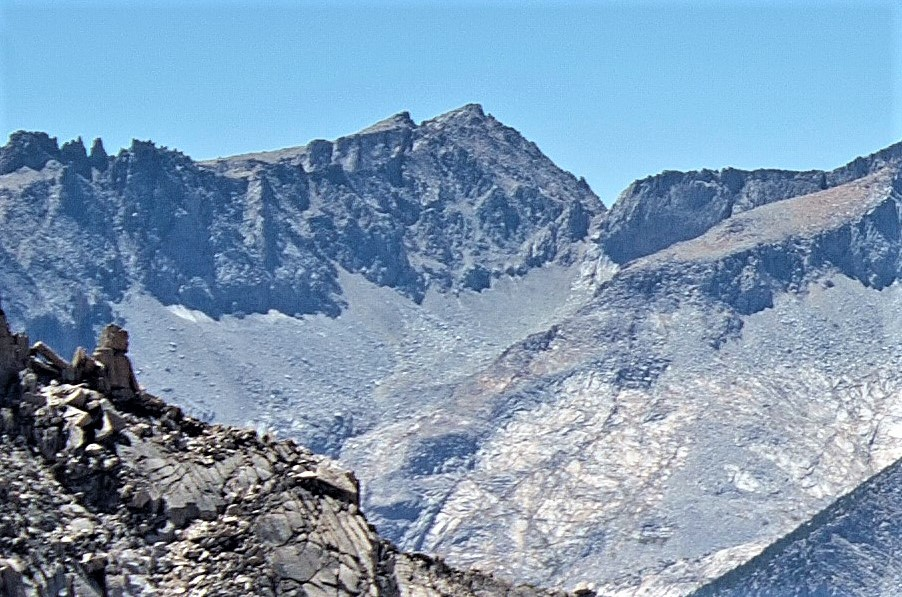
- Northeast aspect, from Glen Pass

Highest point
- Elevation: 13,232 ft (4,033 m)
- Prominence: 502 ft (153 m)
- Parent peak: Mount Brewer (13,569 ft)
- Isolation: 1.03 mi (1.66 km)
- Listing: Sierra Peaks Section
- Coordinates: 36°41′36″N 118°29′02″W

Geography
- Location within California Location within the United States
- Location: Kings Canyon National Park; Tulare County; California, U.S.
- Parent range: Sierra Nevada; Great Western Divide
- Topo map: USGS Mount Brewer

Geology
- Rock type: granitic

Climbing
- First ascent: 1925
- Easiest route: class 3 South slope

South Guard is a remote 13,232-foot-elevation (4,033-meter) mountain summit located near the northern end of the Great Western Divide of the Sierra Nevada mountain range, in Tulare County of northern California. It is situated in Kings Canyon National Park, 1.63 miles (2.62 km) south of North Guard, and one mile south of Mount Brewer, which is the nearest higher neighbor. Topographic relief is significant as the west aspect rises 4,600 feet (1,400 meters) above Cloud Canyon in 3.5 miles, and the east aspect rises 3,200 feet (980 meters) above Lake Reflection in two miles. South Guard ranks as the 103rd highest summit in California, and the third-highest point of the northern Great Western Divide.

== History ==
The names South Guard and North Guard first appeared on either side of Mt. Brewer on Lieutenant Milton F. Davis’ map of 1896. The first ascent of South Guard's lower 12,964-ft peak was made July 26, 1916, by Walter L. Huber, James Rennie, Florence C. Burrell, and Inezetta Holt. The main 13,232-ft summit was first climbed July 17, 1925, by Norman Clyde, who is credited with 130 first ascents, most of which were in the Sierra Nevada. A possibility exists that this peak may have been climbed by Clarence King and Richard D. Cotter on July 4, 1864.

== Climate ==
South Guard is located in an alpine climate zone. Most weather fronts originate in the Pacific Ocean, and travel east toward the Sierra Nevada mountains. As fronts approach, they are forced upward by the peaks, causing them to drop their moisture in the form of rain or snowfall onto the range (orographic lift). Precipitation runoff from the east side of the mountain drains to Bubbs Creek, and west to Roaring River, which are both tributaries of the South Fork Kings River.

== See also ==
- List of mountain peaks of California

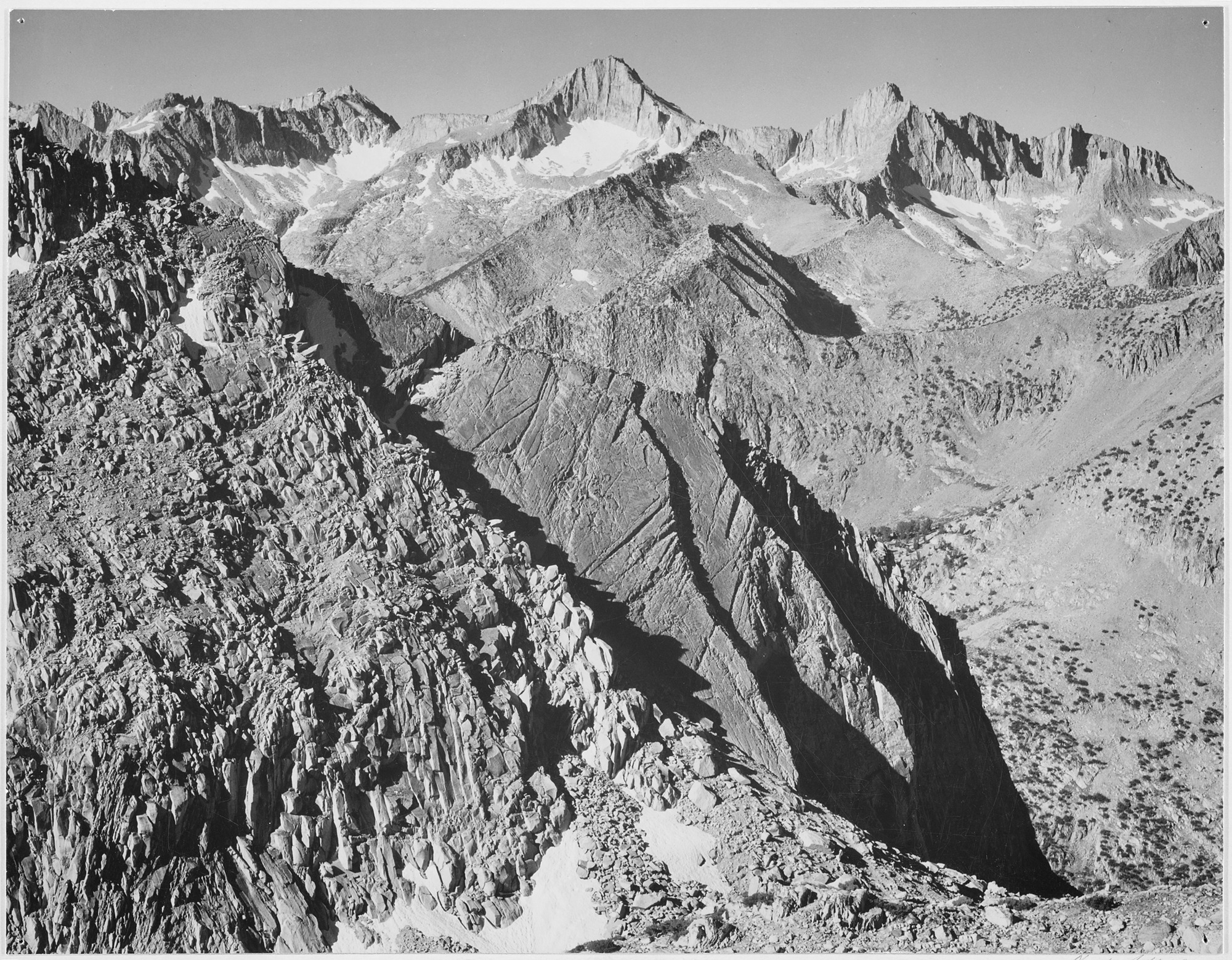
South Guard, Mt. Brewer, and North Guard by Ansel Adams ca. 1936
