= Grand Sentinel =

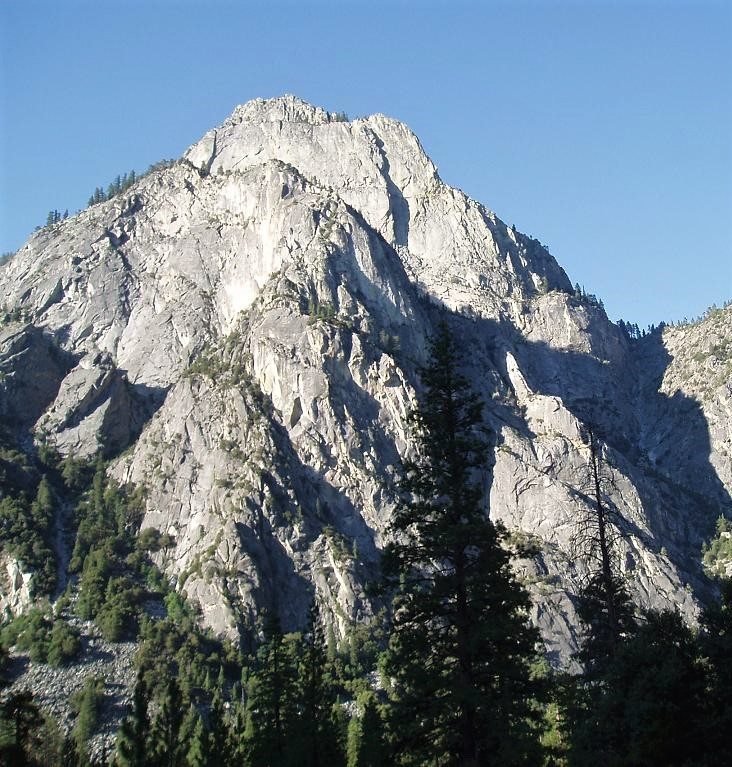

Highest point
- Elevation: 8,518 ft (2,596 m)
- Prominence: 99 ft (30 m)
- Parent peak: Palmer Mountain (11,254 ft)
- Isolation: 2.04 mi (3.28 km)
- Coordinates: 36°47′01″N 118°35′03″W

Geography
- Location within California Location within the United States
- Country: United States
- State: California
- County: Fresno
- Protected area: Kings Canyon National Park
- Parent range: Sierra Nevada; Great Western Divide
- Topo map: USGS The Sphinx

Geology
- Rock type: granitic

Grand Sentinel is an 8,518-foot-elevation (2,596-meter) pillar located west of the crest of the Sierra Nevada mountain range, in Kings Canyon National Park, in Fresno County of northern California. This landmark is situated at the northern end of the Great Western Divide, two miles west-northwest of The Sphinx, and immediately south of Kanawyers and Zumwalt Meadow. Topographic relief is significant as the north aspect rises nearly 3,500 feet (1,100 meters) above the canyon floor in one-half mile. This feature's name has been officially adopted by the United States Board on Geographic Names.

== Climate ==
According to the Köppen climate classification system, Grand Sentinel is located in an alpine climate zone. Most weather fronts originate in the Pacific Ocean, and travel east toward the Sierra Nevada mountains. As fronts approach, they are forced upward by the peaks, causing them to drop their moisture in the form of rain or snowfall onto the range (orographic lift). Precipitation runoff from the peak drains into the South Fork Kings River.

== See also ==
- List of mountain peaks of California

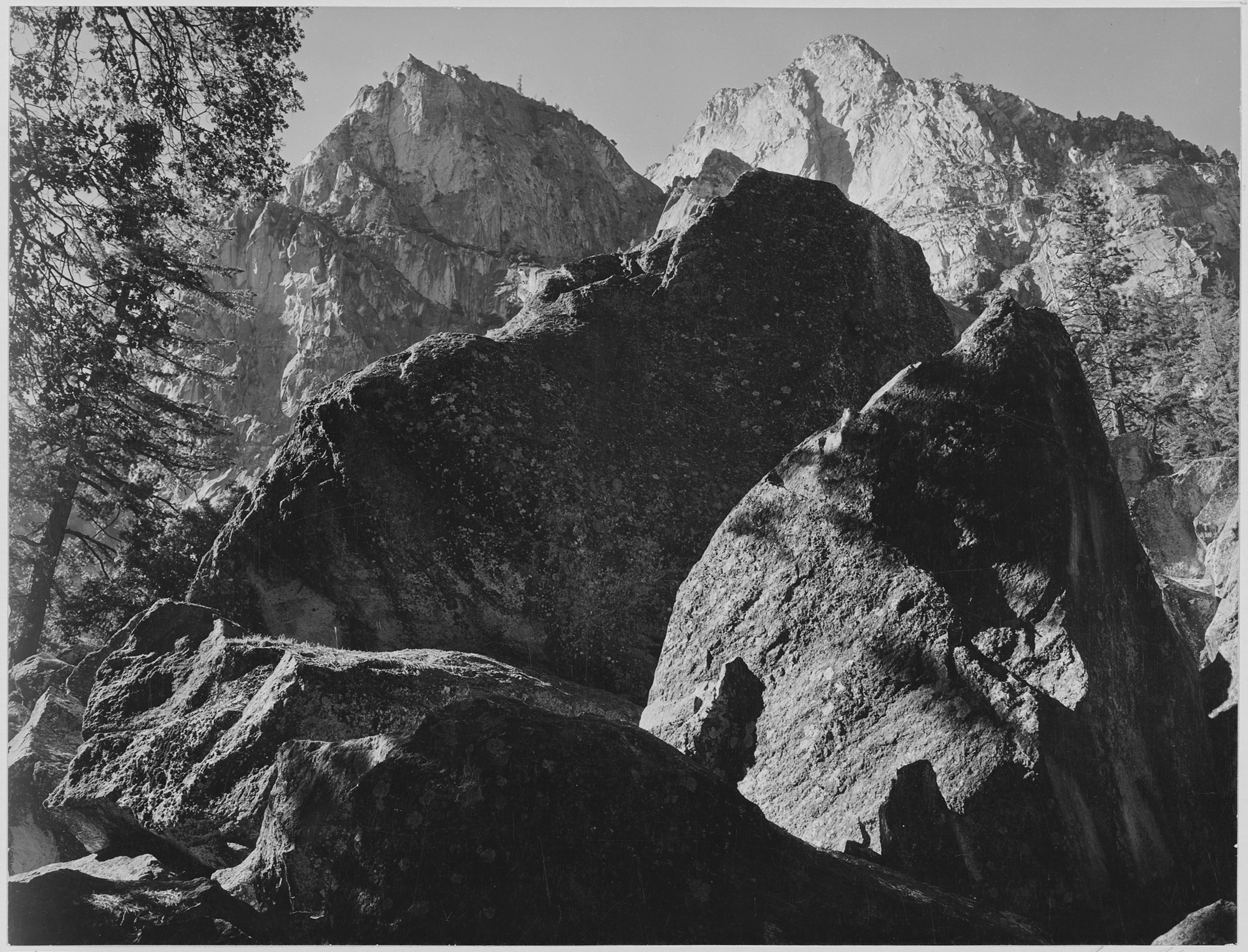
Grand Sentinel by Ansel Adams, circa 1936
