= Francis P. Farquhar =

American mountaineer, environmentalist and author (1887–1974)

Francis Peloubet Farquhar
- Farquhar, early 1930s
- Born: December 31, 1887; Newton, Massachusetts
- Died: November 21, 1974 (aged 86); Berkeley, California
- Occupation: Accountant
- Known for: Mountaineering, environmentalism, California historian

Francis Peloubet Farquhar (December 31, 1887 – November 21, 1974) was an American mountaineer, environmentalist and author. In his professional life, he was a Certified Public Accountant.

== Early life ==
Farquhar was born in Newton, Massachusetts, the son of David Webber Farquhar (1844–1905) and Grace Thaxter Peloubet (1863–1943). He attended Harvard University, where he edited The Harvard Crimson for three years and studied under, among others, Bliss Perry and George Santayana. Graduating from Harvard in 1909, he came to San Francisco in 1910, where he worked for a publisher and began a lifelong interest in fine printing. He visited Yosemite and joined the Sierra Club in 1911. He then returned to New England to pursue the profession of accounting, studying under Clinton Scovell, a pioneer in the field of cost accounting.

== California ==
In 1914 he moved again to California. He served in the Navy there and in Washington, D.C., during World War I. In 1922 he set up his own accounting firm in San Francisco. In 1936 he brought in Clifford Heimbuchder, who soon became a full partner in the firm, renamed Farquhar and Heimbucher.

Farquhar was active in the Sierra Club, serving on its board of directors from 1924 to 1951 and president in 1933-1935 and 1948–1949. He served as Sierra Club Bulletin editor from 1926 to 1946.

Farquhar was a mountaineer who invited Robert L. M. Underhill to introduce proper use of modern Alpine rope techniques to Sierra Club members on an annual club High Trip in 1931. He made multiple first ascents. On August 26, 1921, he completed the first ascent of Middle Palisade by the south-west chute with Ansel Hall.

He was the author of numerous articles for the Sierra Club and the California Historical Society, some of which were reprinted in book form. In 1956-59 he was editor of the American Alpine Journal published by the American Alpine Club. He edited and wrote forewords for several books on California history. His best known book is History of the Sierra Nevada (1965), which is still in print.

In addition to serving as Sierra Club president, he was president of the California Society of Certified Public Accountants (1942–43), California Academy of Sciences (1950-53), and the California Historical Society (1960–62). In 1965 he was awarded the Sierra Club's John Muir Award for distinguished work as a conservationist and mountaineer. He received the Henry R. Wagner Memorial Award of the California Historical Society in 1966. The University of California at Los Angeles conferred on him the honorary degree of Doctor of Humane Letters in 1967.

== Family life ==
In 1934 he married Marjory Bridge, fellow mountaineer; they had three children, Peter, Suzanne and Roger. His half brother was the Los Angeles architect Robert D. Farquhar, who moved in with the Farquhars in Berkeley in 1953. Marjorie Bridge Farquhar died in 1999 in San Francisco.

== Legacy ==
Mount Farquhar (12,893'), located 1.6 miles (2.6 km) northwest of Mount Brewer in Kings Canyon National Park, was named in his honor.

Since 1970, the Sierra Club has given the Francis P. Farquhar Mountaineering Award in his honor.

== Selected writings ==
- 1925: Exploration of the Sierra Nevada, California Historical Society
- 1926: Place Names of the High Sierra, Sierra Club
- 1929: Mount Olympus, Johnck & Seeger (San Francisco)
- 1930: Up and Down California in 1860-1864: The Journal of William H. Brewer, University of California Press (Berkeley, CA)
- 1932: Joaquin Murieta, the Brigand Chief of California, Grabhorn Press, San Francisco
- 1938: Preface to Clarence King's The Helmet of Mambrino, The Book Club of California
- 1943: A Brief Chronology of Discovery in the Pacific Ocean from Balboa to Capt. Cook's First Voyage, 1513 to 1770, Grabhorn Press, San Francisco
- 1947: Preface and editing, Clarence King's Mountaineering in the Sierra Nevada
- 1948: Yosemite, the Big Trees and the High Sierra: A Selective Bibliography, University of California Press (Berkeley, CA), ISBN 978-1-57898-155-7
- 1950: Flight to the North Pole, 24 August 1949, Grabhorn Press (Berkeley, CA)
- 1953: First Ascents Throughout the World, 1901-1950, Grabhorn Press (Berkeley, CA)
- 1953: The Books of the Colorado River & the Grand Canyon, Fretwater Press, ISBN 978-1-892327-14-7
- 1957: Place Names for Bohemians: Clubhouse to Grove, Silverado Squatters
- 1959: Naming Alaska's mountains: with some accounts of their first ascents, American Alpine Club
- 1965: History of the Sierra Nevada, University of California Press, Berkeley, ISBN 0-520-01551-7
- 1968: "Comments on Some Bay Area Fine Printers" in Edwin Grabhorn: Recollections of the Grabhorn Press, University of California, Bancroft Library, Regional Oral History Office
