= Mount Genevra =

Mountain in the state of California

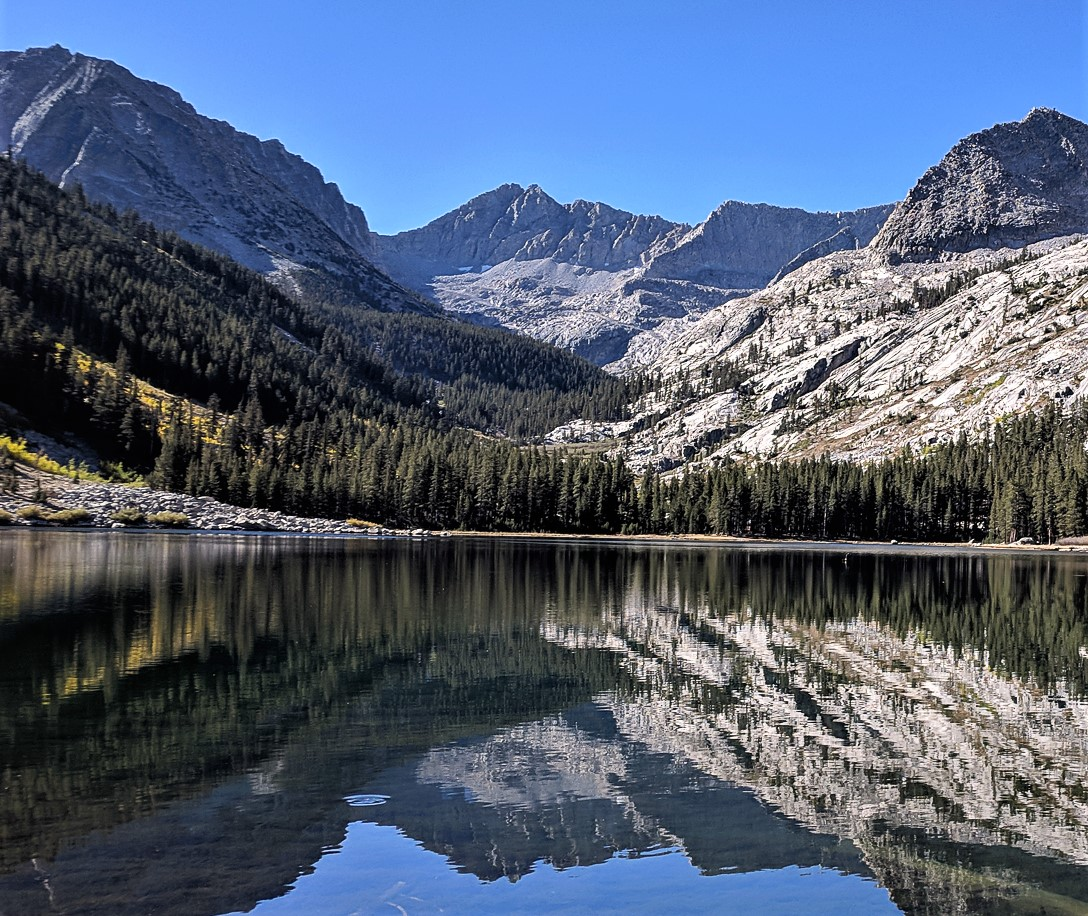
- North aspect centered, from East Lake

Highest point
- Elevation: 13,054 ft (3,979 m)
- Prominence: 456 ft (139 m)
- Parent peak: Mount Jordan (13,353 ft)
- Isolation: 0.86 mi (1.38 km)
- Listing: Sierra Peaks Section
- Coordinates: 36°41′00″N 118°26′04″W

Naming
- Etymology: Genevra Evo Magee

Geography
- Location within California Location within the United States
- Location: Kings Canyon National Park; Sequoia National Park; Tulare County, California, U.S.
- Parent range: Sierra Nevada; Kings–Kern Divide
- Topo map: USGS Mount Brewer

Geology
- Rock type: granitic

Climbing
- First ascent: 1925, Norman Clyde
- Easiest route: class 2

Mount Genevra is a remote 13,054-foot-elevation (3,979-meter) mountain summit located on the Kings–Kern Divide of the Sierra Nevada mountain range, in Tulare County of northern California. It is situated on the shared boundary of Kings Canyon National Park with Sequoia National Park, 3.5 miles (5.6 km) southeast of Mount Brewer, and 0.86 miles (1.38 km) east of Mount Jordan, which is the nearest higher neighbor. Topographic relief is significant as the north aspect rises 3,025 feet (922 meters) above Lake Reflection in 1.5 mile. Mount Genevra ranks as the 138th highest summit in California, and the eighth highest peak on the Kings–Kern Divide.

== History ==
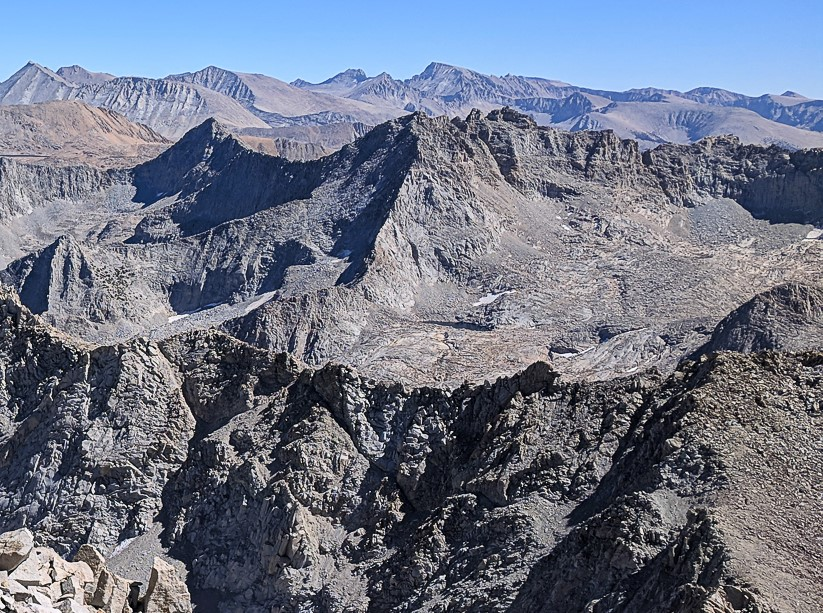
Mt. Jordan center, Mt. Genevra to left (shaded), seen from Mt. Brewer

The mountain was named in 1899 from the summit of Mount Brewer by Joseph Nisbet LeConte, his future wife Helen Gompertz, and others in the climbing party including Genevra Magee, for whom the mountain was named. Mrs. Genevra Evo Magee and her husband Walter Magee worked at the University of California in the Physical Culture program. This mountain's name was officially adopted in 1928 by the United States Board on Geographic Names.

The first ascent of the summit was made July 15, 1925, by Norman Clyde, who is credited with 130 first ascents, most of which were in the Sierra Nevada.

== Climbing ==
Established climbing routes:

- East face – August 6, 1939, by Dave Nelson, Earl Jessen, Hal Leich
- North ridge – August 3, 1940, by Robert Schonborn and party of six
- North face – July 19, 1951, by Bill Bade, Barbara Lilley, Franklin Barnett

== Climate ==
According to the Köppen climate classification system, Mount Genevra is located in an alpine climate zone. Most weather fronts originate in the Pacific Ocean, and travel east toward the Sierra Nevada mountains. As fronts approach, they are forced upward by the peaks, causing them to drop their moisture in the form of rain or snowfall onto the range (orographic lift). Precipitation runoff from the mountain drains north to Bubbs Creek, and south into headwaters of the Kern River.

== See also ==
- List of mountain peaks of California
