= Avalanche Pass =

Avalanche Pass may be one of the following:

== Mountain passes ==
- Avalanche Pass (Canada) – a pass on the Continental Divide of the Americas between Alberta and British Columbia, Canada
- Avalanche Pass (California) – a pass in Fresno County, California, United States
- Avalanche Pass (Colorado) – a pass in Gunnison County, Colorado, United States
- Avalanche Pass (New York) – a pass in Essex County, New York, United States

== Books ==
- Avalanche Pass (novel) – a novel by John Flanagan
