= Tuolumne =

Tuolumne may refer to:

- Tuolumne River, one of the major rivers draining the western slope of the Sierra Nevada mountains
  - Tuolumne Grove, of giant sequoia trees, in Yosemite National Park
  - Tuolumne Meadows, in the eastern section of Yosemite National Park
  - Grand Canyon of the Tuolumne, also in Yosemite National Park
- Tuolumne County, California, located in the Sierra Nevada
  - Tuolumne City, California, an unincorporated community in Tuolumne County
- Tuolumne Peak
- "Tuolumne", a song by Eddie Vedder from the soundtrack for Into the Wild
- Toulumne, Dan Cody's yacht in The Great Gatsby by F. Scott Fitzgerald
