= Mount Jordan =

Mountain in the state of California

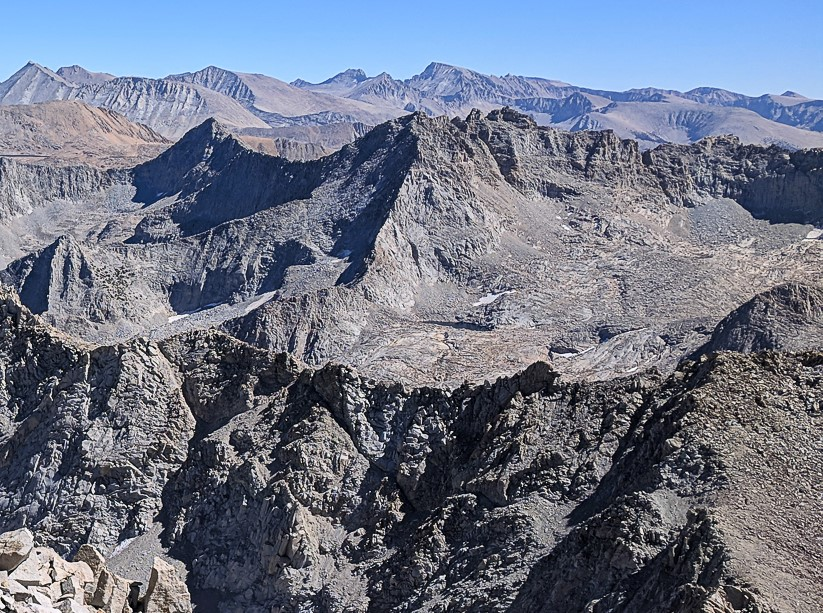
- Mt. Jordan centered, Mt. Genevra to left (shaded), seen from Mt. Brewer

Highest point
- Elevation: 13,343 ft (4,067 m)
- Prominence: 613 ft (187 m)
- Parent peak: Thunder Mountain (13,523 ft)
- Isolation: 1.70 mi (2.74 km)
- Listing: Sierra Peaks Section
- Coordinates: 36°40′56″N 118°26′59″W

Naming
- Etymology: David Starr Jordan

Geography
- Location within California Location within the United States
- Location: Kings Canyon National Park; Sequoia National Park; Tulare County, California, U.S.
- Parent range: Sierra Nevada; Kings–Kern Divide
- Topo map: USGS Mount Brewer

Geology
- Rock type: granitic

Climbing
- First ascent: 1925, Norman Clyde
- Easiest route: class 4

Mount Jordan is a remote 13,343-foot-elevation (4,067-meter) mountain summit located on the Kings–Kern Divide of the Sierra Nevada mountain range, in Tulare County of northern California. It is situated on the shared boundary of Kings Canyon National Park with Sequoia National Park, 3.1 miles (5.0 km) southwest of Mount Stanford, and one mile west of Mount Genevra, which is the nearest neighbor. Topographic relief is significant as the north aspect rises 3,313 feet (1,010 meters) above Lake Reflection in 1.3 mile. Mount Jordan ranks as the 84th highest summit in California, and the fifth-highest peak on the Kings–Kern Divide.

== History ==
The mountain's name was proposed by the Sierra Club in 1925 to honor David Starr Jordan (1851–1931), the founding president of Stanford University. This mountain's name was officially adopted in 1926 by the United States Board on Geographic Names.

Dr. Jordan, with a party of Stanford associates, spent several weeks of 1899 in the Bubbs Creek region, exploring and mapping Ouzel Creek, to which he gave its name, and he climbed Mount Stanford on August 16, 1899.

In July 2020, the president of the Sierra Club denounced Jordan for being one of the "vocal advocates for white supremacy and its pseudo-scientific arm, eugenics." The president also announced, "We will also spend the next year studying our history and determining which of our monuments need to be renamed or pulled down entirely." It is not yet clear on how such a reassessment would affect the status of Mount Jordan, which the club had helped to name.

The probable first ascent of the lower north summit was made July 15, 1925, by Norman Clyde, who is credited with 130 first ascents, most of which were in the Sierra Nevada.

== Climbing ==
Established climbing routes:

- From the south – First ascent in 1936, by two Sierra Club parties led by Lewis Clark and Carl Jensen
- North face – August 3, 1940, by Art Argiewicz and six others
- West face – descended August 3, 1940, by Art Argiewicz and party

== Climate ==
Mount Jordan is located in an alpine climate zone. Most weather fronts originate in the Pacific Ocean, and travel east toward the Sierra Nevada mountains. As fronts approach, they are forced upward by the peaks, causing them to drop their moisture in the form of rain or snowfall onto the range (orographic lift). Precipitation runoff from the mountain drains north to Bubbs Creek, and south into headwaters of the Kern River.

== See also ==
- List of mountain peaks of California
