= Mount Farquhar =

Mountain in the American state of California

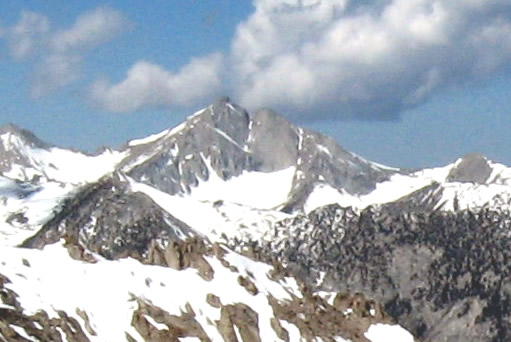
- Mount Farquhar's Northeast Face, showing its old namesake notch, from Kearsarge Pass, May 2009.

Highest point
- Elevation: 12,890 ft (3,929 m) NGVD 29
- Prominence: 652 ft (199 m)
- Parent peak: North Guard
- Coordinates: 36°43′43″N 118°29′56″W

Geography
- Location within California
- Location: Tulare County, California, U.S.
- Parent range: Great Western Divide, Sierra Nevada
- Topo map: USGS Mount Brewer

Climbing
- First ascent: July 17, 1932 by Norman Clyde and party
- Easiest route: South Ridge or Northwest Ridge (both class 3 scrambles)

Mount Farquhar, or Mount Francis Farquhar, is a peak in Kings Canyon National Park. It is named in for Francis P. Farquhar, a conservationist who played a key role in creating the park.

== Geography ==
Mount Farquhar is, in the southern portion of Kings Canyon National Park, on the Great Western Divide north of North Guard and Mount Brewer. Its west facing slopes feed Sphinx Creek, while its east facing slopes feed Cross Creek and North Guard Creek. All of these drain through Bubbs Creek to the South Fork of the Kings River.

== History ==
This summit was informally known as Notch Peak, after the prominent notch in its profile when seen from the east, until 1989. That year, the United States Geological Survey's Board on Geographic Names recognized a new name of the peak to commemorate Francis Farquhar, who had died fifteen years earlier. Farquhar, a local mountaineer, had worked as an author and a director of the Sierra Club to protect the Kings Canyon region of the Sierra Nevada.

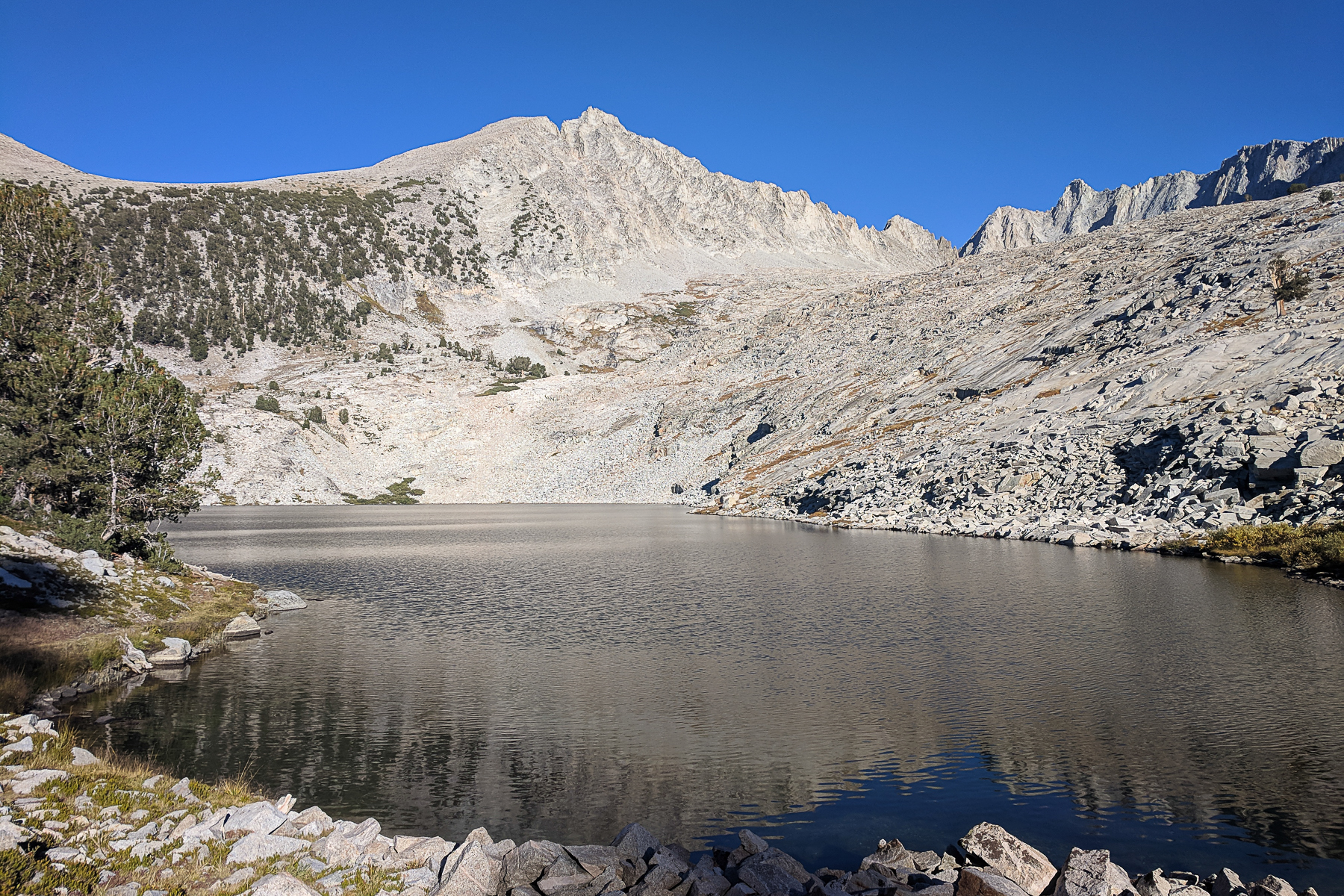
West aspect of Mount Farquhar seen from Sphinx Lake

== Climbing ==
The first ascent was made on July 17, 1932, by the South Ridge route. A large first ascent party was composed of Dorothy Baird, D.R. Brothers, Alice Carter, Norman Clyde, Glen Dawson, William Dulley, Patricia Goodhue, Katherine Lindforth, Julie Mortimer, Arthur Neld, Lincoln O'Brien, Thomas Rawles, John Schager and Alfred Weiler. They scrambled cross country to the Sphinx Lakes, climbed to the col south of the peak, and ascended by way of the south ridge.

Other established routes on Mount Farquhar include the Northwest Ridge, the Blank Stair Route (grade IV, class 5.10+), and the Northeast Face (grade IV, class 5.8) put up in September 1971 by Jeanne Neal and Galen Rowell.
