= Tuolumne Peak =

Mountain in Yosemite National Park, USA

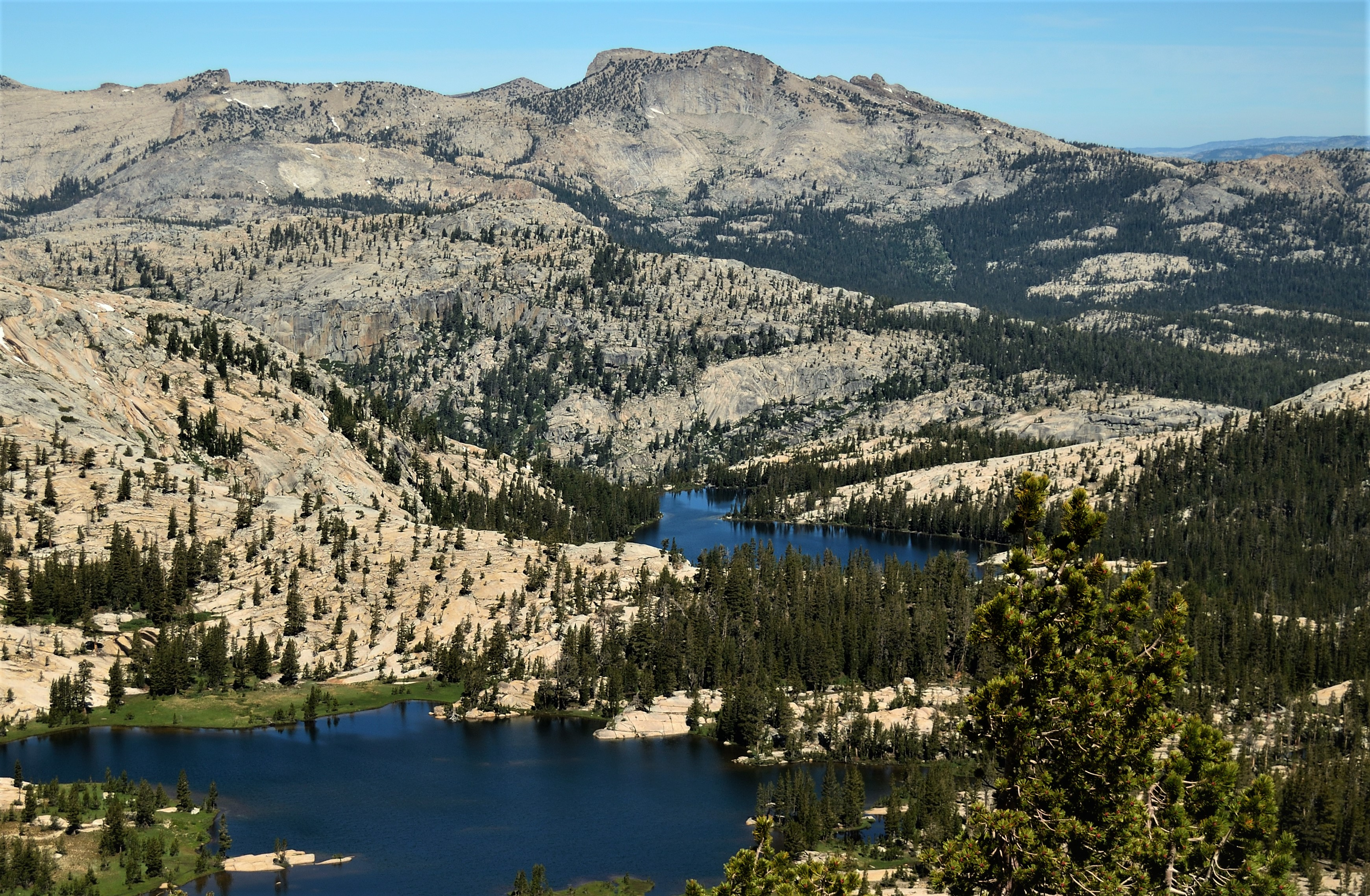
- Southeast aspect centered at top

Highest point
- Elevation: 10,845 ft (3,306 m) NAVD 88
- Prominence: 685 ft (209 m)
- Coordinates: 37°52′31″N 119°29′5″W

Geography
- Location within California Location within the United States
- Location: Yosemite National Park; Tuolumne County, California, U.S.
- Parent range: Sierra Nevada
- Topo map: USGS Falls Ridge

Geology
- Rock age: Cretaceous
- Rock type: Granodiorite

Climbing
- First ascent: Richard M. Leonard and Sierra Club party on July 9, 1932

Tuolumne Peak is a mountain, in Yosemite National Park, in the area of Tuolumne Meadows. It is a fractured granite, twin summited peak, and is close to geographic center of the park. Tuolumne Peak is located approximately 2.5 miles (4.0 km) northeast of Mount Hoffmann via a granite ridge-line. It is climbed less often than Hoffman, probably due to a more difficult approach.

There is rock climbing, on Tuolumne Peak.

Tenaya Glacier had effects, at least near Tuolumne Peak, during the Wisconsin Glacial Stage, over-topping the ridge that connects Tuolumne Peak to Mount Hoffman, isolating both tops.

== Climate ==
Tuolumne Peak is located in an alpine climate zone. Most weather fronts originate in the Pacific Ocean, and travel east toward the Sierra Nevada mountains. As fronts approach, they are forced upward by the peaks (orographic lift), causing them to drop their moisture in the form of rain or snowfall onto the range.

Climate data for Tuolumne Peak (CA) 37.8744 N, 119.4855 W, Elevation: 10,289 ft (3,136 m) (1991–2020 normals)
| Month | Jan | Feb | Mar | Apr | May | Jun | Jul | Aug | Sep | Oct | Nov | Dec | Year |
|---|---|---|---|---|---|---|---|---|---|---|---|---|---|
| Mean daily maximum °F (°C) | 35.2 (1.8) | 34.1 (1.2) | 36.9 (2.7) | 40.7 (4.8) | 48.0 (8.9) | 57.8 (14.3) | 66.3 (19.1) | 65.0 (18.3) | 59.3 (15.2) | 50.4 (10.2) | 40.9 (4.9) | 35.1 (1.7) | 47.5 (8.6) |
| Daily mean °F (°C) | 26.0 (−3.3) | 24.1 (−4.4) | 26.4 (−3.1) | 29.3 (−1.5) | 36.0 (2.2) | 45.4 (7.4) | 53.0 (11.7) | 52.0 (11.1) | 46.5 (8.1) | 38.5 (3.6) | 30.7 (−0.7) | 25.5 (−3.6) | 36.1 (2.3) |
| Mean daily minimum °F (°C) | 16.7 (−8.5) | 14.2 (−9.9) | 15.9 (−8.9) | 17.9 (−7.8) | 24.0 (−4.4) | 33.0 (0.6) | 39.7 (4.3) | 39.1 (3.9) | 33.6 (0.9) | 26.6 (−3.0) | 20.5 (−6.4) | 15.9 (−8.9) | 24.8 (−4.0) |
| Average precipitation inches (mm) | 11.46 (291) | 10.14 (258) | 9.31 (236) | 5.30 (135) | 3.29 (84) | 0.90 (23) | 0.45 (11) | 0.25 (6.4) | 0.69 (18) | 3.13 (80) | 5.20 (132) | 10.58 (269) | 60.7 (1,543.4) |
Source: PRISM Climate Group

== See also ==
- Geology of the Yosemite area
- May Lake

== Gallery ==
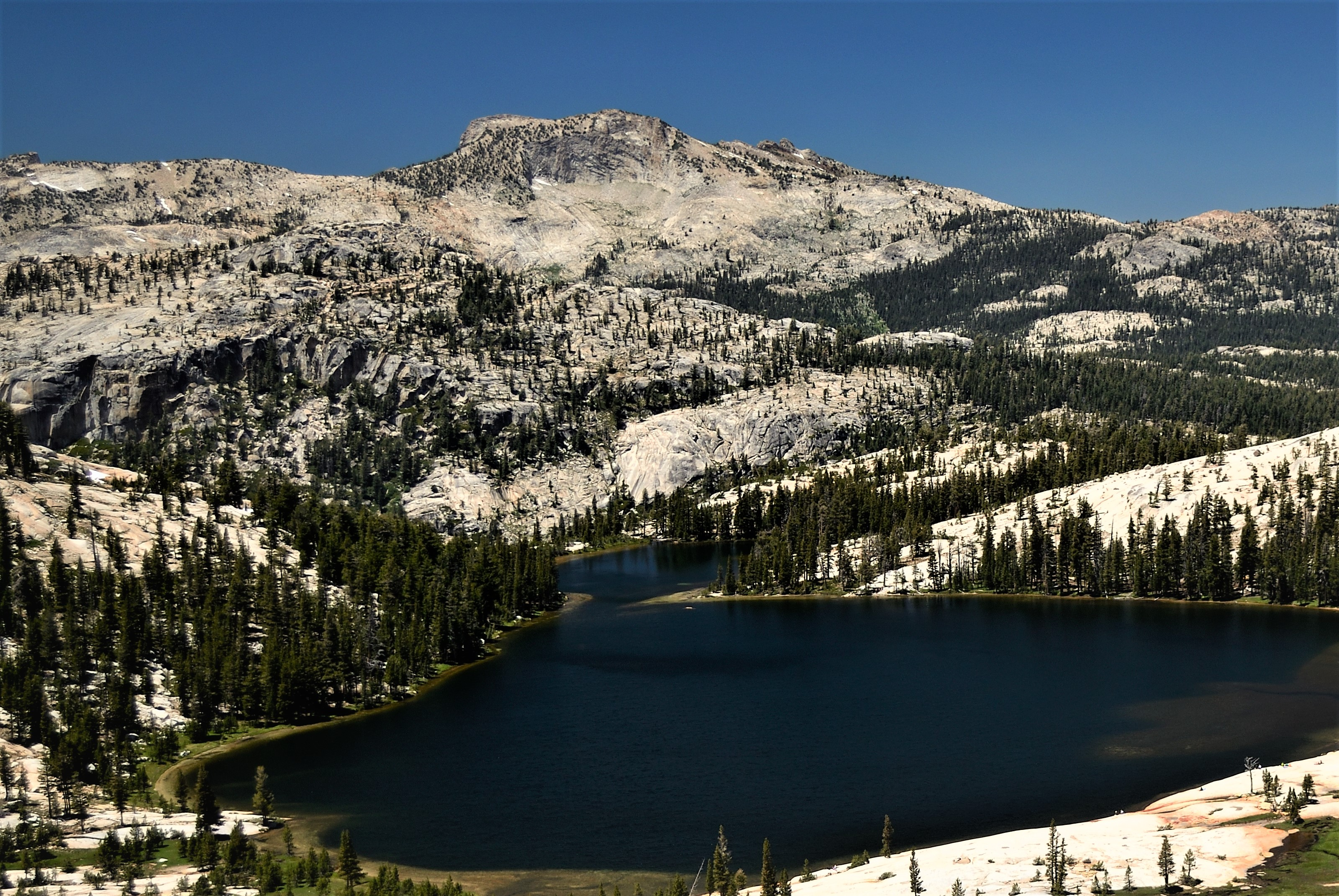
Lower Cathedral Lake and Tuolumne Peak

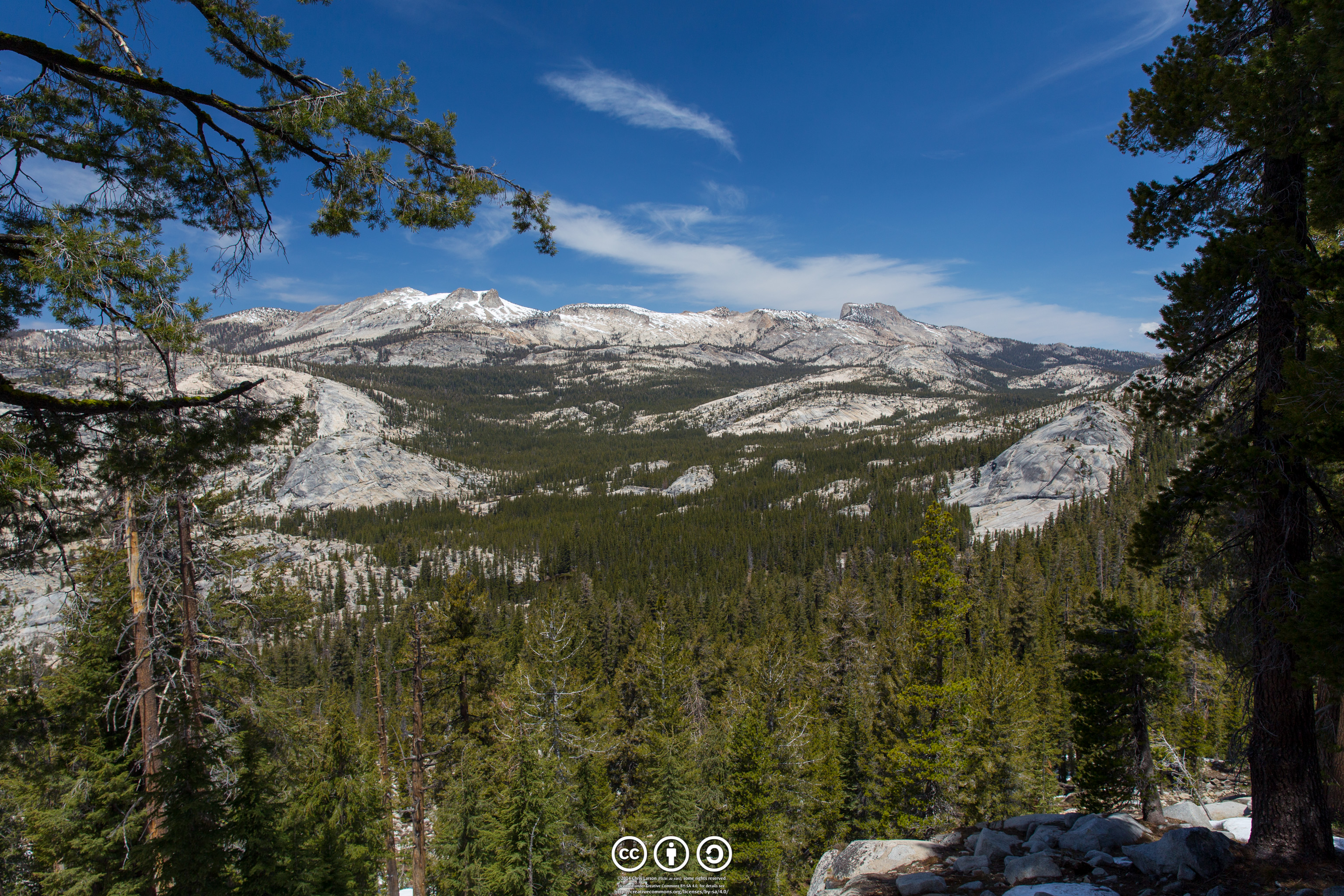
Mount Hoffman (L) and Tuolumne Peak (R)
