= North Guard =

Mountain in the state of California

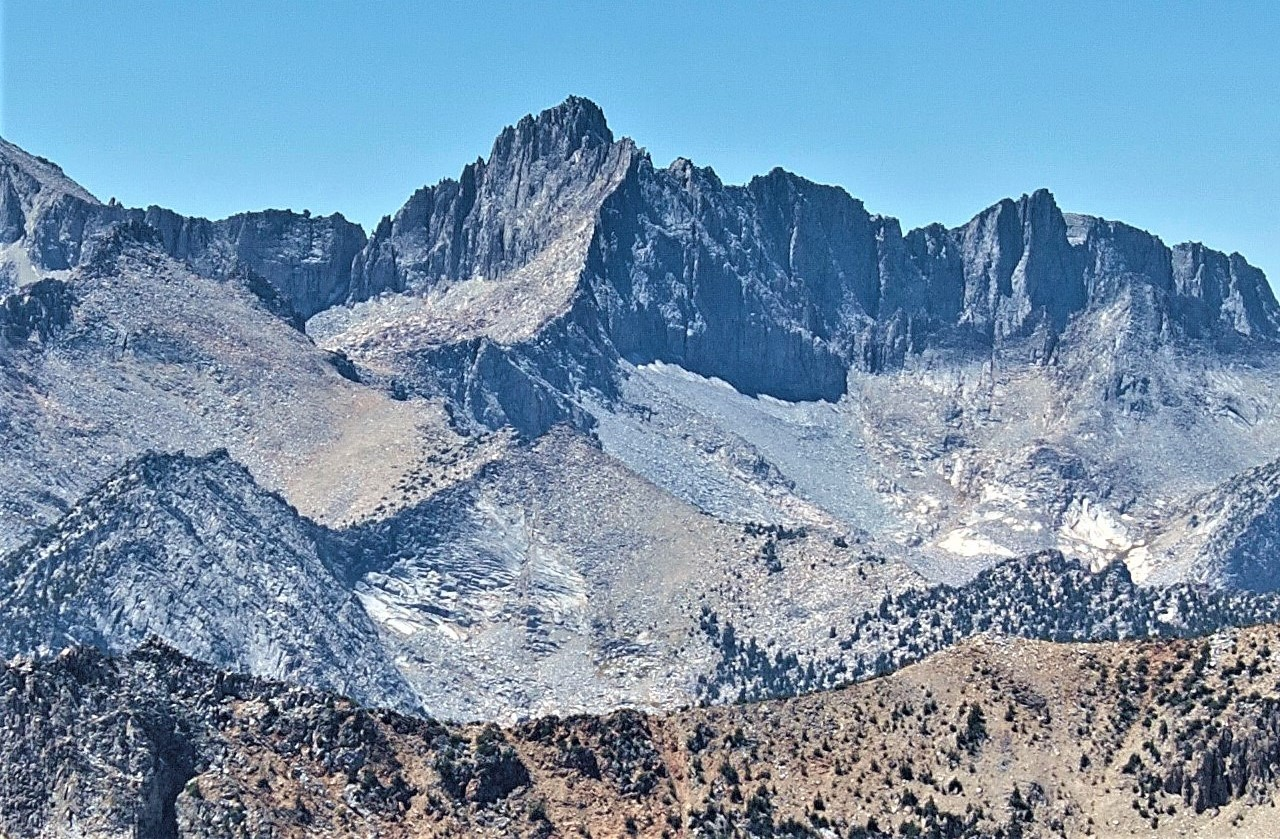
- Northeast aspect, from Glen Pass

Highest point
- Elevation: 13,327 ft (4,062 m)
- Prominence: 532 ft (162 m)
- Parent peak: Mount Brewer (13,569 ft)
- Isolation: 0.62 mi (1.00 km)
- Listing: Sierra Peaks Section
- Coordinates: 36°42′59″N 118°29′24″W

Geography
- Location within California Location within the United States
- Location: Kings Canyon National Park; Tulare County; California, U.S.
- Parent range: Sierra Nevada; Great Western Divide
- Topo map: USGS Mount Brewer

Geology
- Rock type: granitic

Climbing
- First ascent: July 12, 1925 Norman Clyde
- Easiest route: class 4 South slope

North Guard is a remote 13,327-foot-elevation (4,062-meter) mountain summit located near the northern end of the Great Western Divide of the Sierra Nevada mountain range, in Tulare County of northern California. It is situated in Kings Canyon National Park, 0.9 miles (1.4 km) southeast of Mount Farquhar, and 0.6 miles (0.97 km) north-northwest of Mount Brewer, which is the nearest higher neighbor. Topographic relief is significant as the east aspect rises 3,858 feet (1,176 meters) above East Lake in three miles. North Guard ranks as the 87th highest summit in California, and the second highest point of the northern Great Western Divide. It's not as high as Mount Brewer, but offers better climbing and is considered one of the classic climbing routes in the Sierra Nevada.

== History ==
The names North Guard and South Guard first appeared on either side of Mt. Brewer on Lieutenant Milton F. Davis’ map of 1896. The first ascent of the summit was made July 12, 1925, via the class 4 southwest face by Norman Clyde, who is credited with 130 first ascents, most of which were in the Sierra Nevada. A class 4 route on the northeast aspect was first climbed in 1934 by David Brower and Hervey Voge. The first ascent via the class 5.8 East Face was made in 1981 by Fred Beckey and Rick Nolting.

== Climate ==
According to the Köppen climate classification system, North Guard is located in an alpine climate zone. Most weather fronts originate in the Pacific Ocean, and travel east toward the Sierra Nevada mountains. As fronts approach, they are forced upward by the peaks, causing them to drop their moisture in the form of rain or snowfall onto the range (orographic lift). Precipitation runoff from the mountain drains north to Bubbs Creek, and west to Roaring River, which are both tributaries of the South Fork Kings River.

== See also ==
- List of mountain peaks of California

== Gallery ==
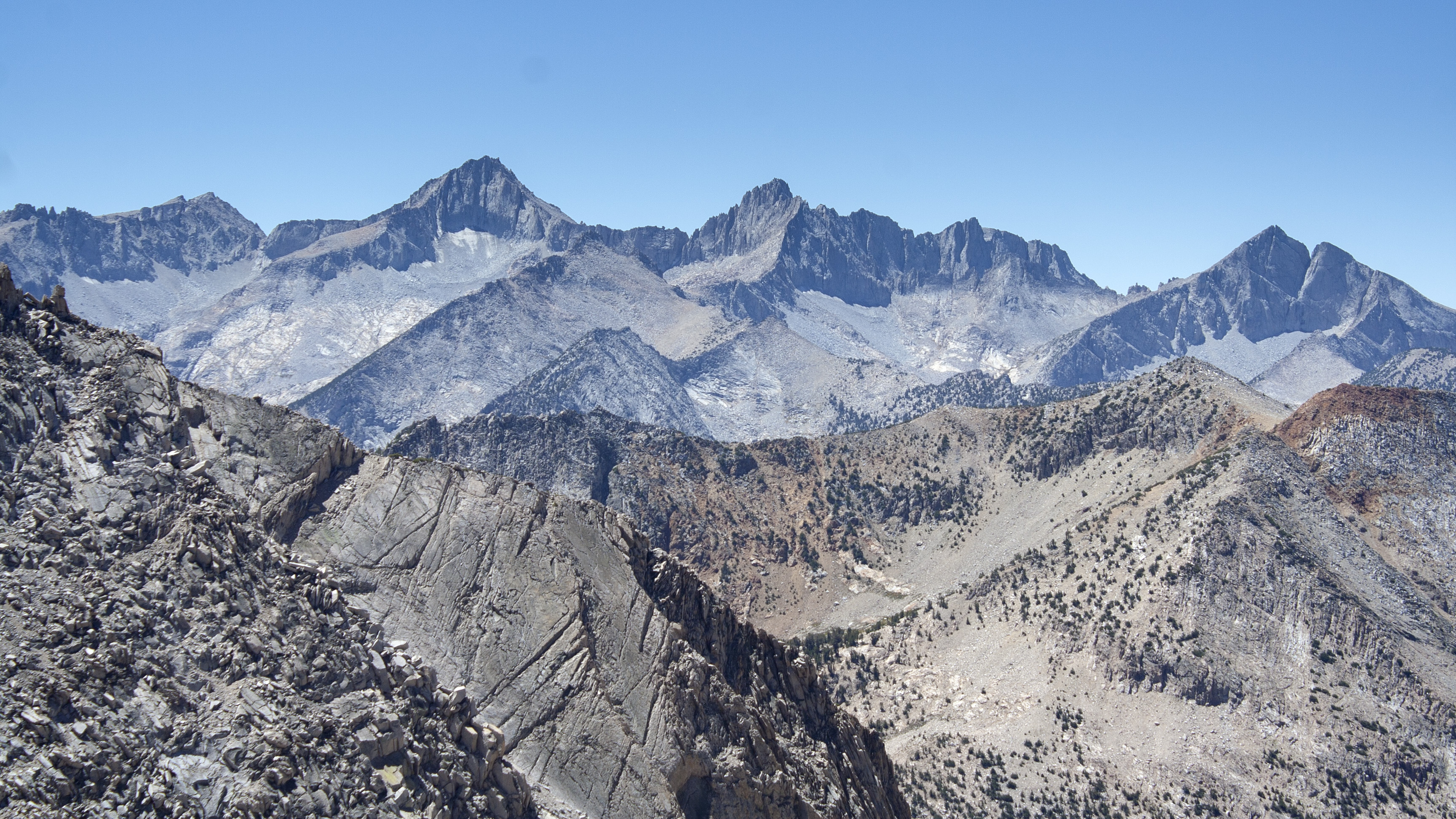
Left to right: South Guard, Mt. Brewer, North Guard, Mt. Farquhar

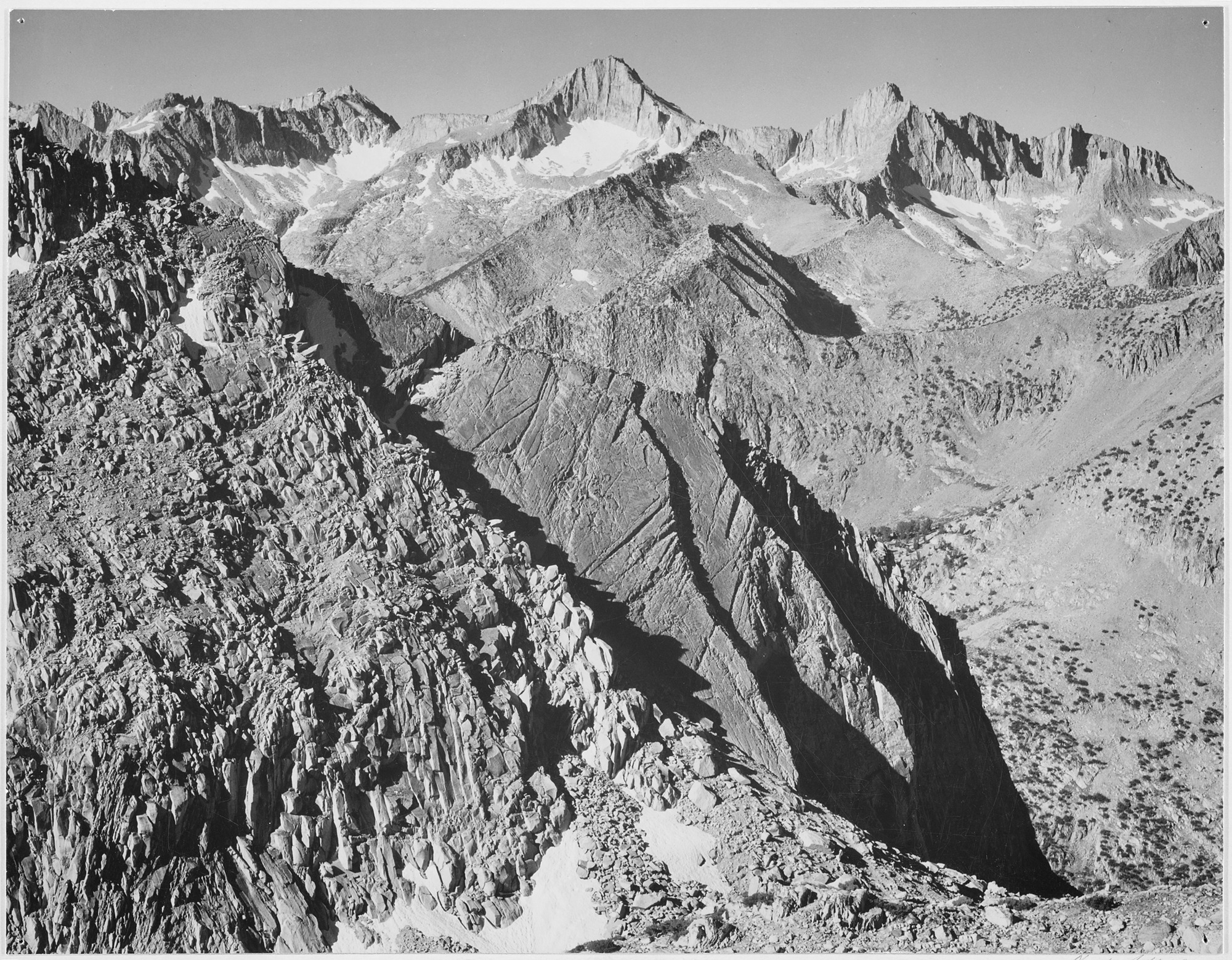
Mt. Brewer and North Guard by Ansel Adams ca. 1936

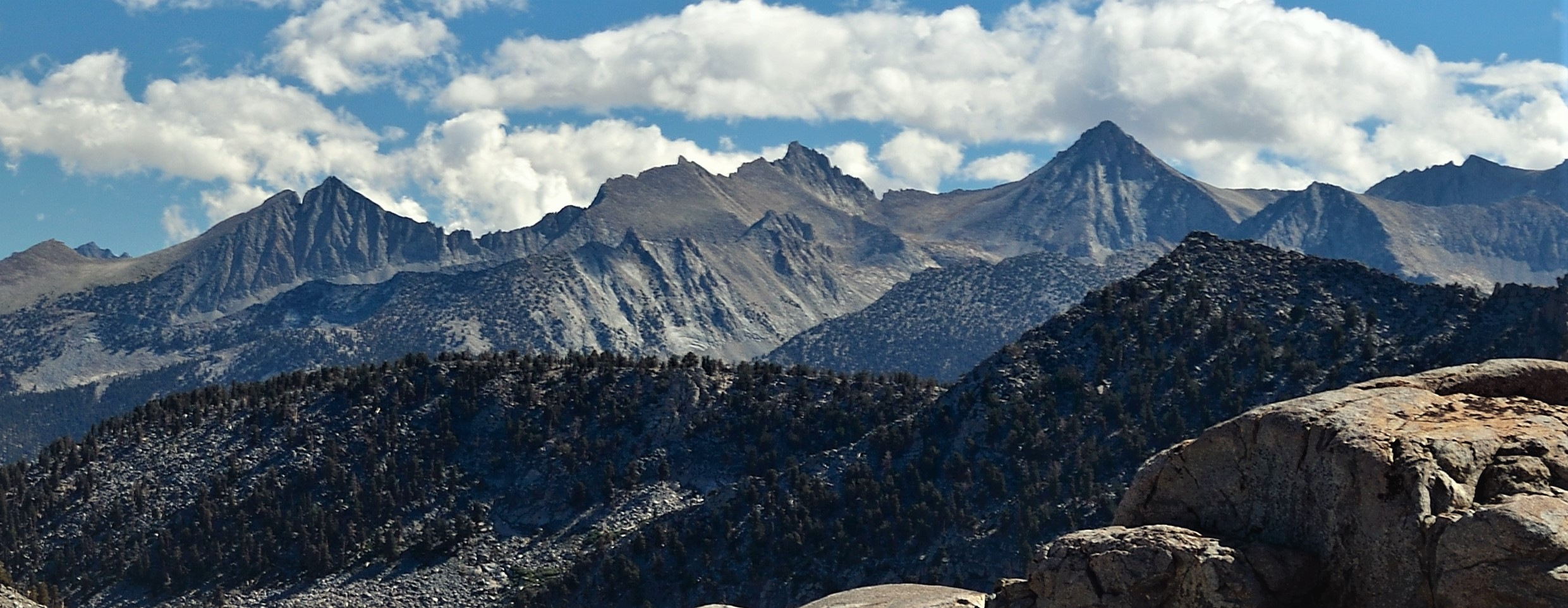
Mt. Farquhar (left), North Guard (center), Mt. Brewer (right), from southwest.
