= Mount Hoffmann =

Mountain in California, United States

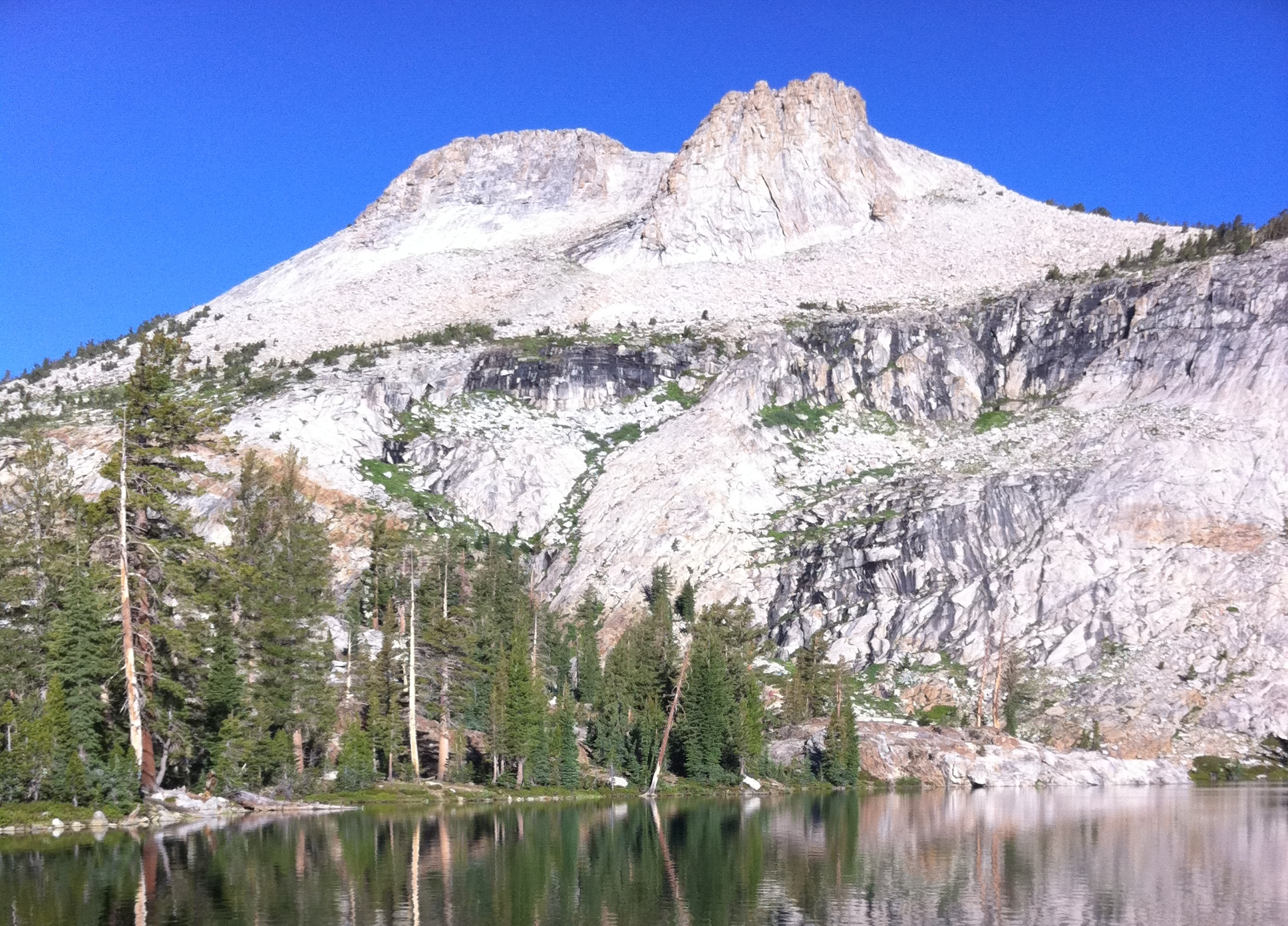
- Mount Hoffmann reflected in May Lake

Highest point
- Elevation: 10,855 ft (3,309 m) NAVD 88
- Prominence: 2,290 ft (698 m)
- Parent peak: Cathedral Peak
- Listing: Western States Climbers peak
- Coordinates: 37°50′49″N 119°30′38″W

Geography
- Location within California Location within the United States
- Location: Yosemite National Park, Mariposa County, California, U.S.
- Parent range: Sierra Nevada
- Topo map: USGS Yosemite Falls

Climbing
- First ascent: July 26, 1869 by John Muir
- Easiest route: Simple scramble, class 2

Mount Hoffmann is a prominent peak in northeastern Mariposa County in the center of Yosemite National Park, California, United States. It rises above May Lake and is a day hike of 6.2 miles (10.0 km) (one-way) from Tioga Pass Road. The mountain is named for the cartographer Charles F. Hoffmann, who was part of the California Geological Survey of the Sierra Nevada.

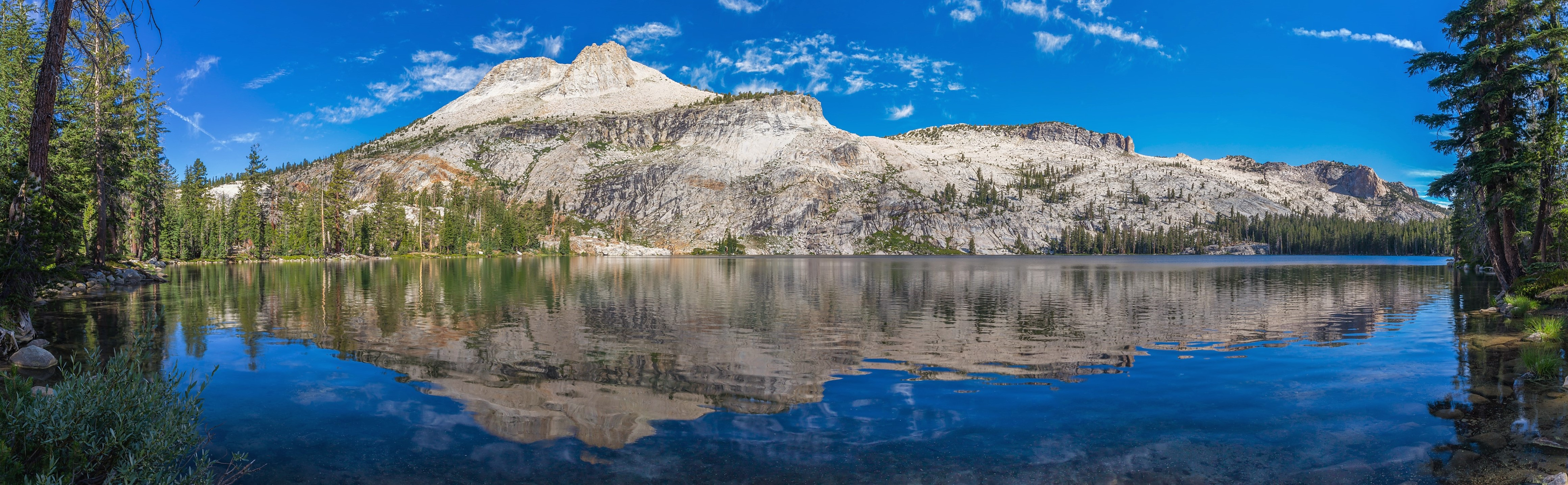
Mount Hoffmann reflected in May Lake

== See also ==
- Tuolumne Peak, 2.5 miles (4.0 km) miles off
