= Lake May (Minnesota) =

Lake in Minnesota, United States

- Location within Minnesota
- Location: Cass County, Minnesota
- Coordinates: 47°5′26″N 94°35′36″W
- Type: lake

Lake May is a lake in Cass County, Minnesota, in the United States.

Lake May was named for May Griffith, the daughter of a county official.

== See also ==
- List of lakes in Minnesota
