= Cedar Grove, Fresno County, California =

Area in Kings Canyon National Park

Cedar Grove
- Location in California
- Coordinates: 36°47′27″N 118°40′13″W
- Country: United States
- State: California
- County: Fresno
- Elevation: 4,610 ft (1,405 m)

Cedar Grove is an area within Kings Canyon National Park. Situated near the South Fork of the Kings River, in Fresno County, California, Cedar Grove and Grant Grove Village are the only commercially developed areas in the park. Facilities include the Cedar Grove Visitor Center, the Cedar Grove Lodge, a market and four campgrounds. The road into the canyon closes mid-November to mid-April.

Although John Muir referred to the area as "Deer Park" in 1891, the name Cedar Grove was in use by 1902. A small hotel was built without a permit in 1897 and was forced to close the next year. The name Cedar Grove Hotel appeared on the Tehipite 30' topographic map from 1905 to 1924. Incense-cedar are abundant in canyon.

== See also ==
- South Fork Kings River
