= May Lake (California) =

Lake in California, United States

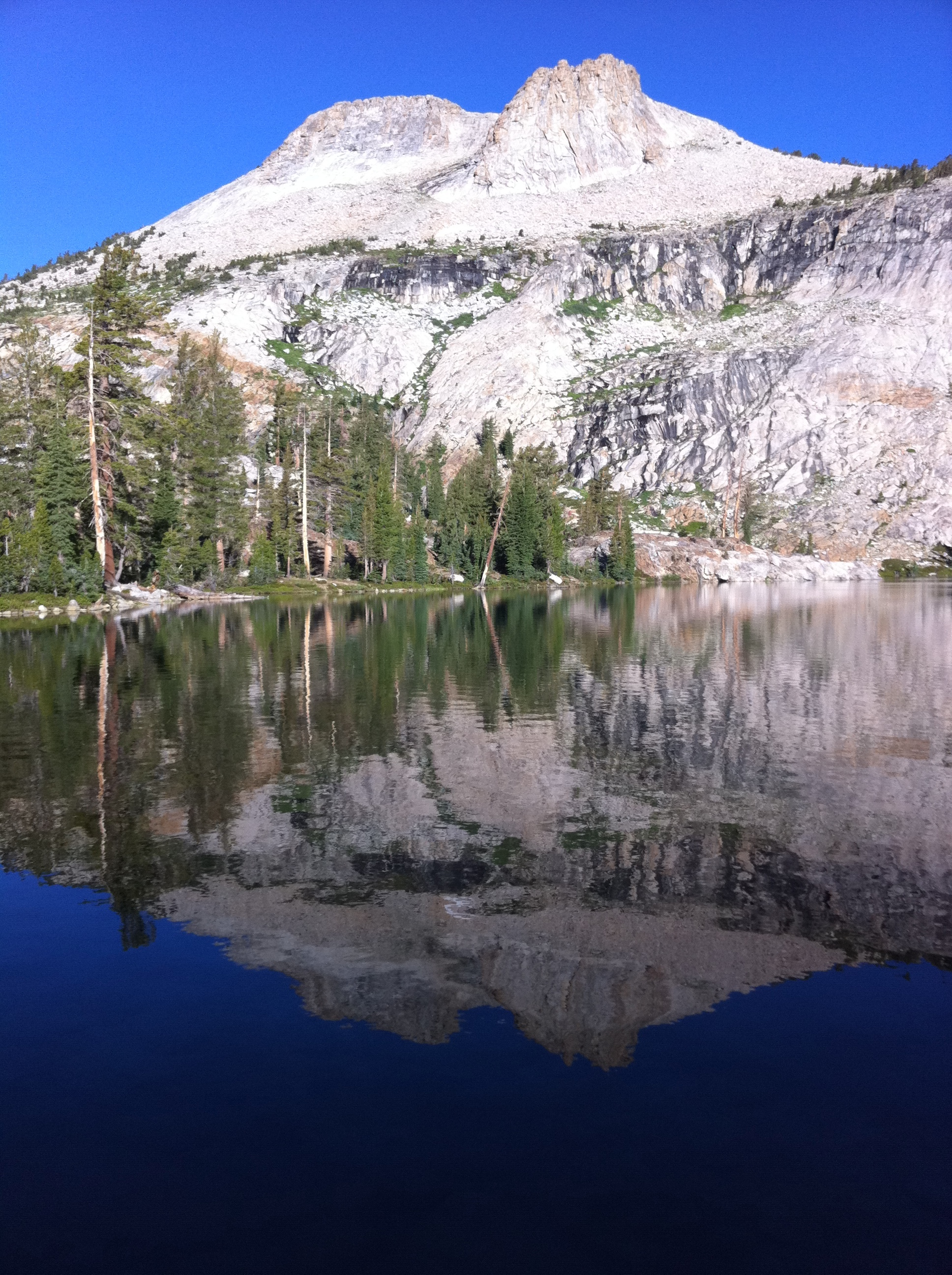
- Mount Hoffmann reflected in May Lake

- Location within California Location within the United States
- Location: Yosemite National Park, Mariposa County, California, United States
- Coordinates: 37°50′50″N 119°29′37″W
- Basin countries: United States
- Surface elevation: 9,270 ft (2,830 m)

May Lake is a lake in Yosemite National Park, as well as a High Sierra Camp where backpackers can stay in tent cabins located near the lake. There are eight cabins that accommodate a total of thirty six guests. The hike to May Lake is from a parking area off Tioga Pass Road and is 1.2 miles (1.9 km). The lake is overlooked by Mount Hoffmann.

May Lake was named by Charles F. Hoffmann, for Lucy Mayotta ("May") Browne, who became his wife in 1870.

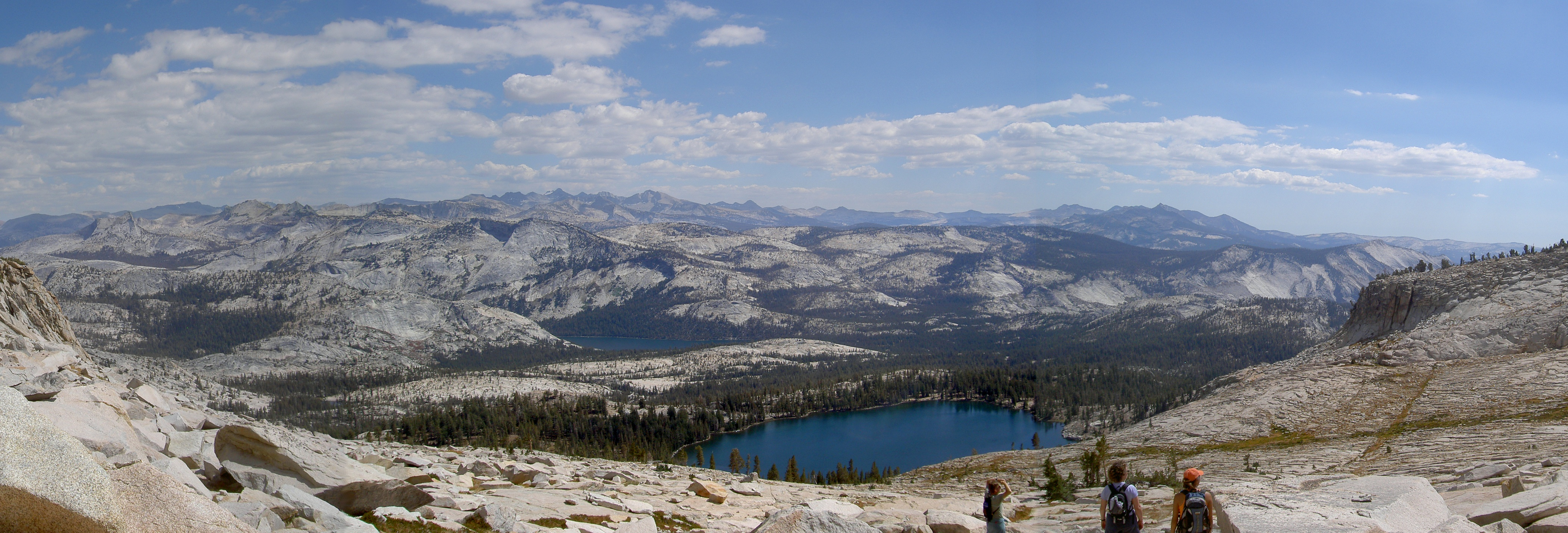
Panorama of May Lake

== See also ==
- List of lakes in California
