= May Lake (Vancouver Island) =

- Location within Vancouver Island
- Location: Vancouver Island, British Columbia
- Coordinates: 48°56′05″N 124°59′50″W
- Lake type: Natural lake
- Basin countries: Canada

May Lake is a lake located on Vancouver Island south of San Mateo Bay and Alberni Inlet.

== See also ==
- List of lakes of British Columbia
