= Charles F. Hoffmann =

German-American topographer

Charles Frederick Hoffmann
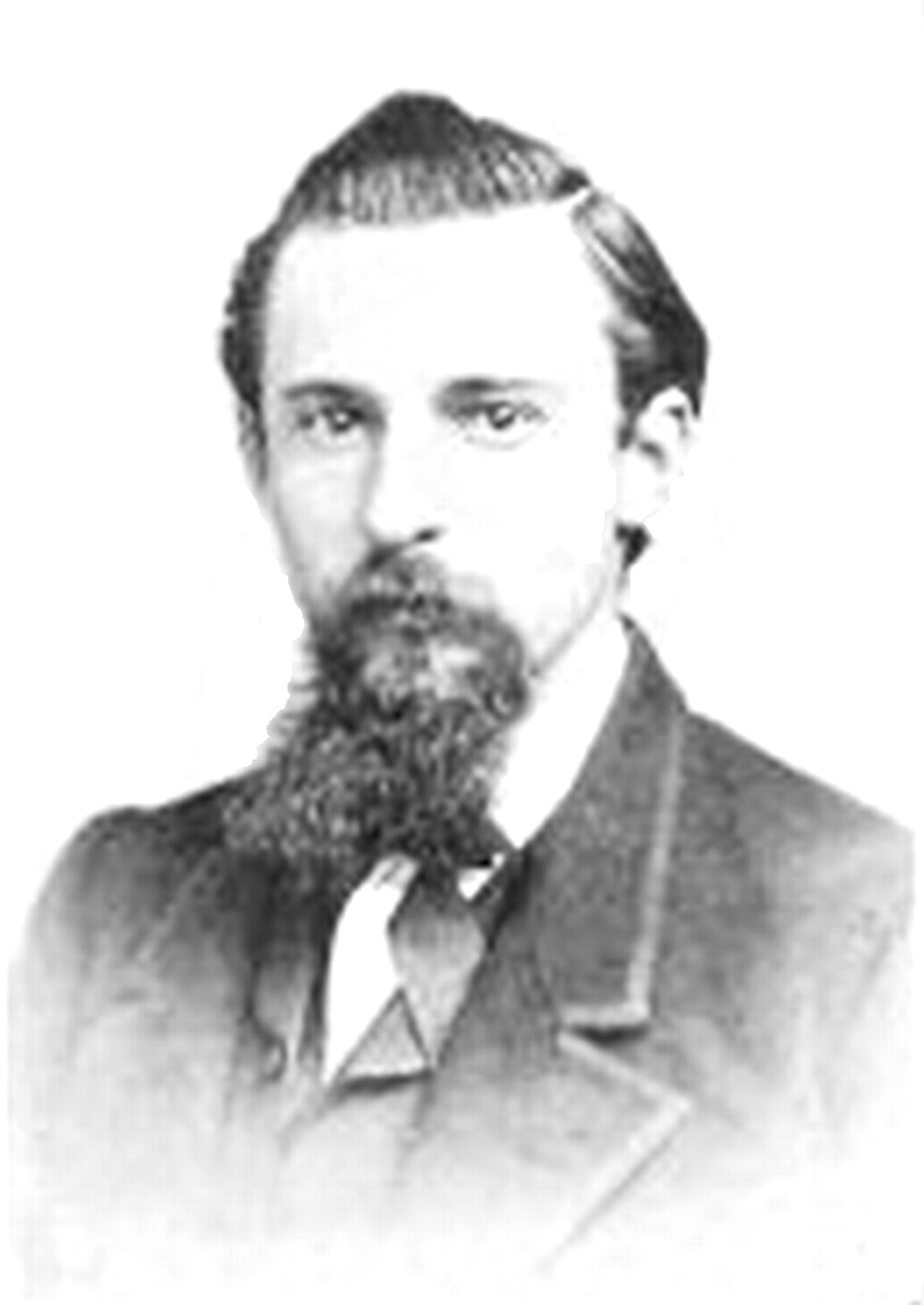
- Born: February 29, 1838; Frankfurt, Germany
- Died: June 20, 1913 (aged 75); Oakland, California
- Scientific career
- Fields: Topography
- Workplaces: California Geological Survey; Harvard University

Charles Frederick Hoffmann (February 29, 1838 – June 20, 1913) was a German-American topographer working in California U.S. from 1860 to 1880.

== Life ==
Hoffmann was born in Frankfurt, Germany on February 29, 1838. After receiving an education in engineering, he emigrated to America. In 1857 he was topographer for Frederick Lander's survey of the Rocky Mountains. He came to California in 1858. He was recruited by Josiah Whitney to join the California Geological Survey because of his valuable skill as a topographer. Hoffmann is largely responsible for introducing topography to the United States. He helped explore the Sierra Nevada of California, from 1860 through 1870, and 1873 through 1874. As a member of the Survey, Hoffmann created the official maps from the expeditions made by the survey team. Hoffmann achieved a number of first ascents in the Sierra Nevada:

- Mount Brewer
- Mount Dana
- Mount Silliman
- Tower Peak

In 1870 he married Lucy Mayotta Browne. In 1871 and 1872 he was Professor of Topographical Engineering at Harvard University. Later, he was a mining engineer at Virginia City, Nevada, San Francisco, California, and Mexico. Charles Hoffmann died in Oakland, California on June 20, 1913.

== Legacy ==
Mount Hoffmann, a high peak in central Yosemite National Park, is named after him.
