= Roaring River (California) =

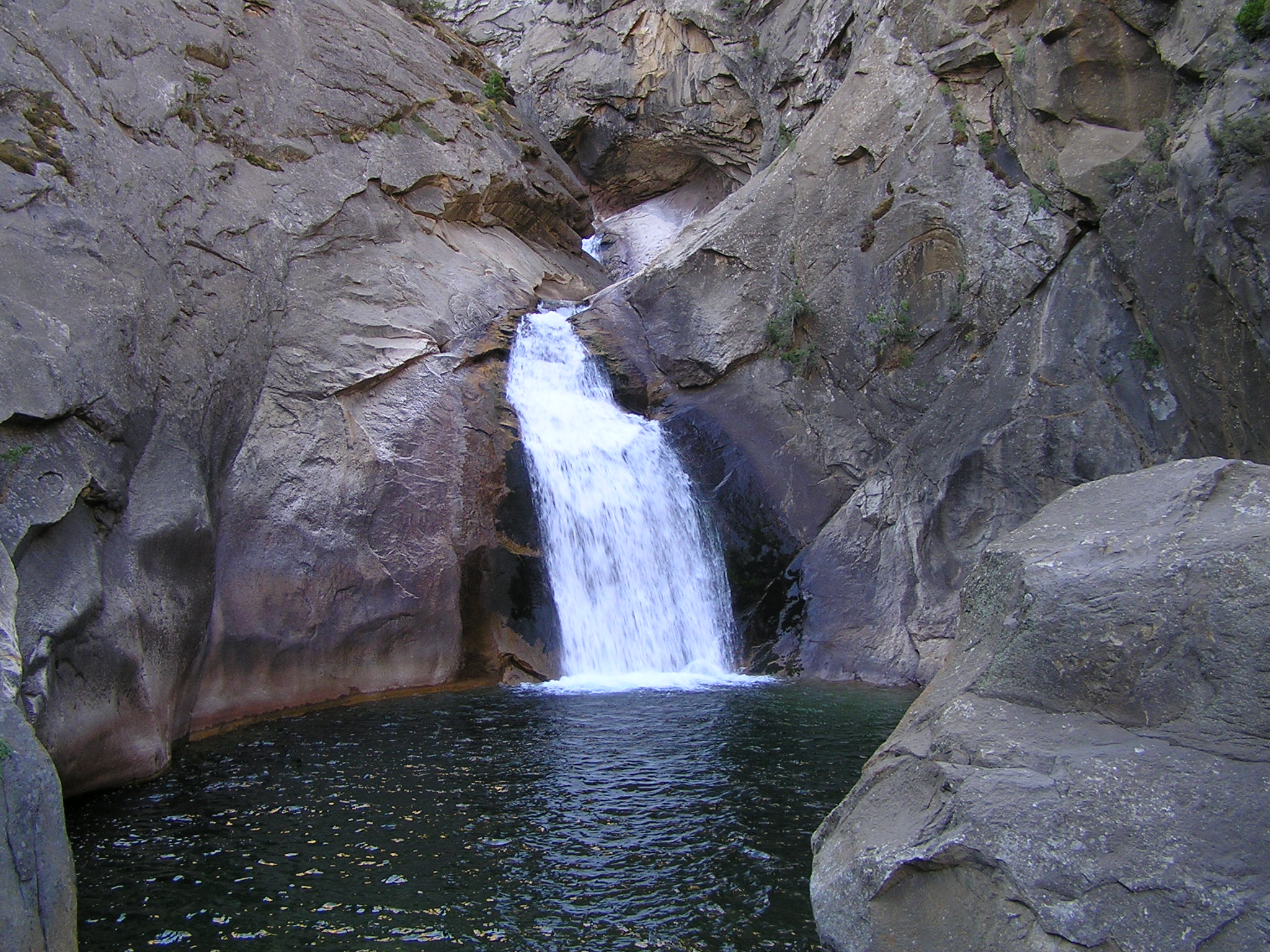
- Roaring River Falls

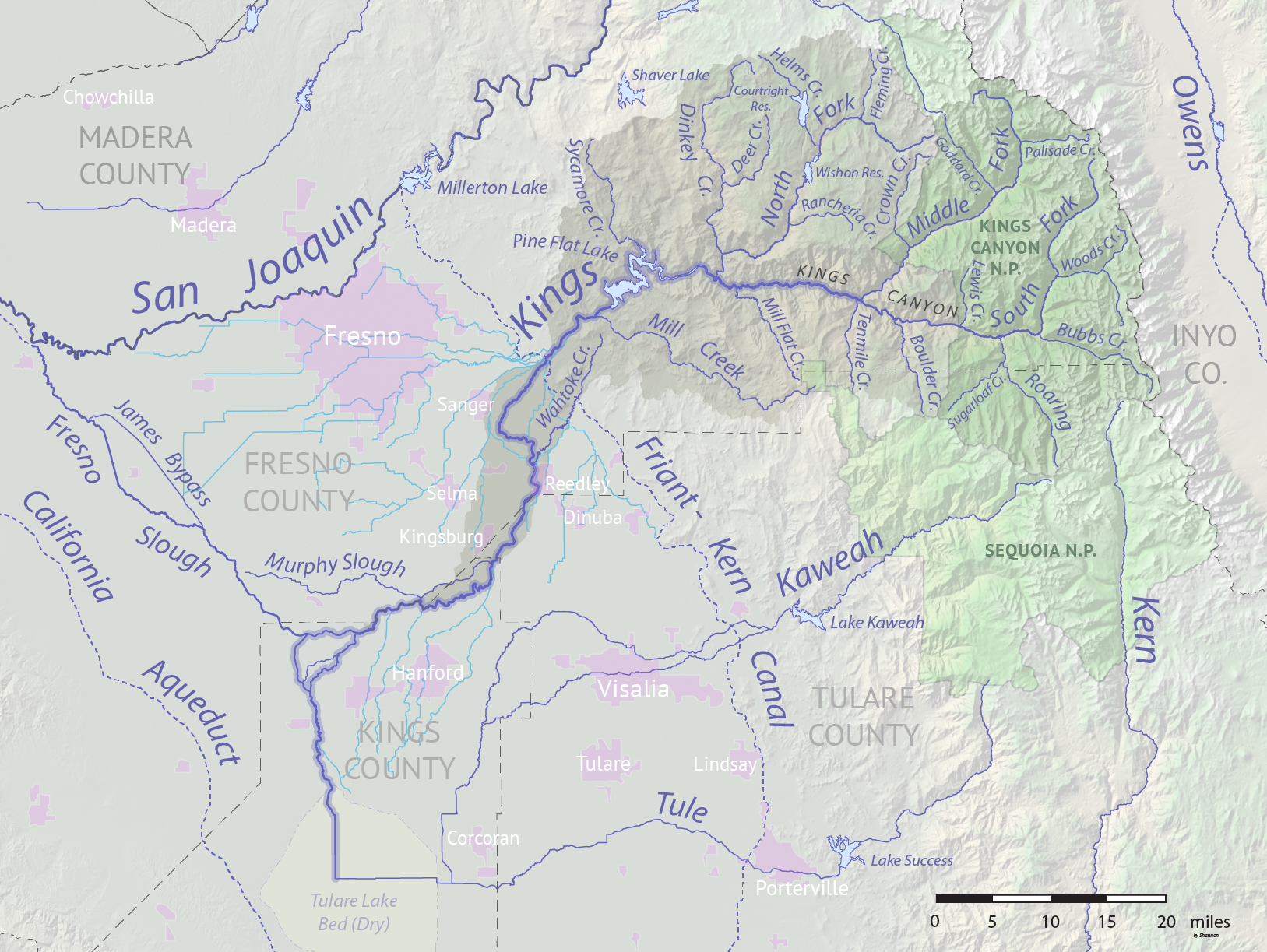
- Map of the Kings River drainage basin. Roaring River joins the South Fork at right.

Location
- Country: United States
- State: California

Physical characteristics
- Source: Great Western Divide
  - coordinates: 36°35′40″N 118°32′19″W
  - elevation: 11,505 ft (3,507 m)
- Mouth: South Fork Kings River
  - location: Cedar Grove
  - coordinates: 36°47′08″N 118°37′36″W
  - elevation: 4,790 ft (1,460 m)
- Length: 16.6 mi (26.7 km)
- Basin size: 115.2 sq mi (298 km^{2})

The Roaring River is a 16.6-mile (26.7 km) long tributary of the South Fork Kings River, in the Sierra Nevada of Fresno County, California. The entire course of the river is within Kings Canyon National Park.

The river originates in the Great Western Divide at Triple Divide Peak, and flows northward through Cloud Canyon before turning northwest, entering Sugarloaf Valley, where it receives Sugarloaf Creek from the west. From there it flows north through a deep and inaccessible gorge, forming the Roaring River Falls near its confluence with the South Fork in Cedar Grove.

The coordinates of the Roaring River waterfall is: 36.7817993, -118.6218786.

== See also ==
- List of rivers of California
