= South Fork Kings River =

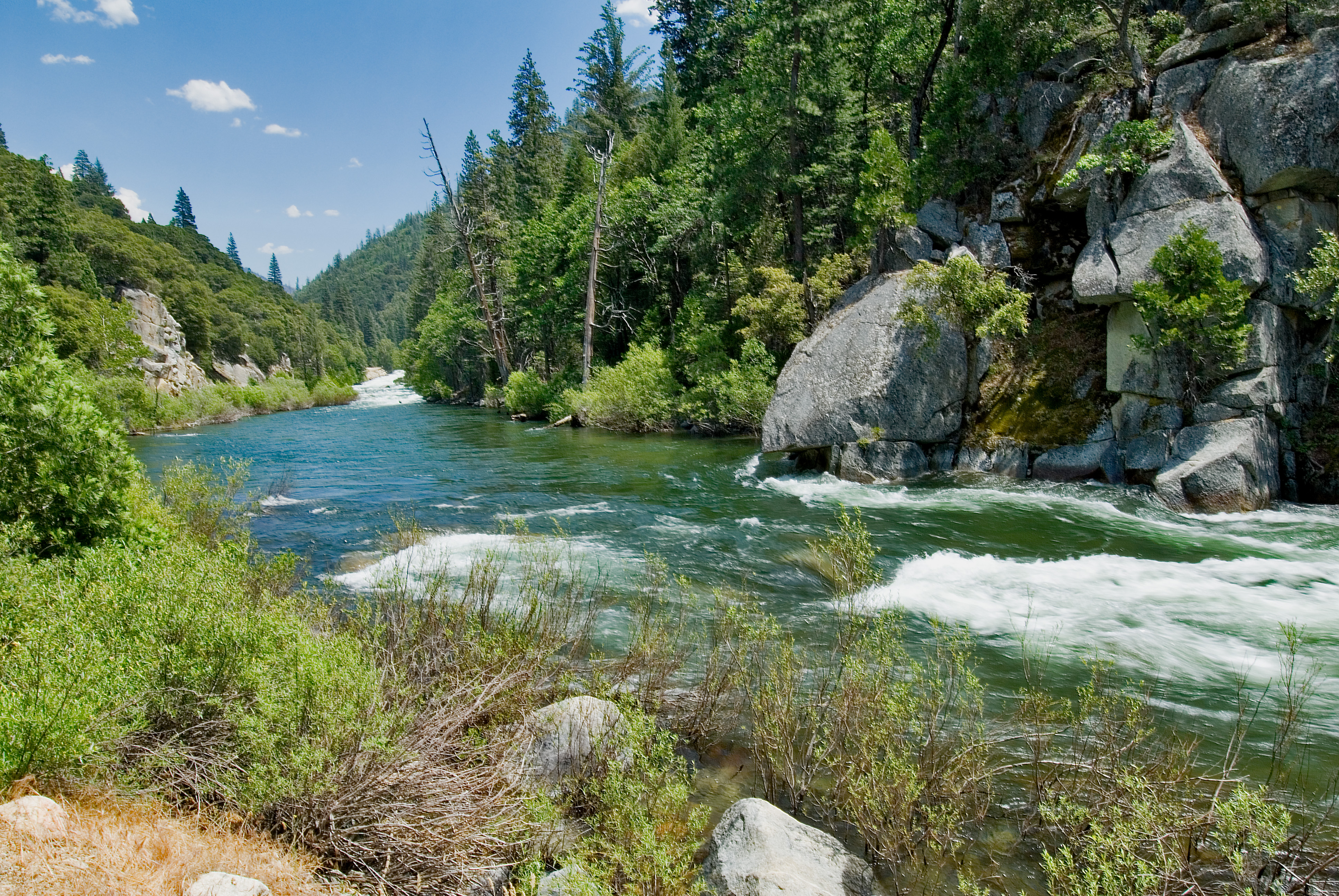
- Headwaters of the South Fork Kings River

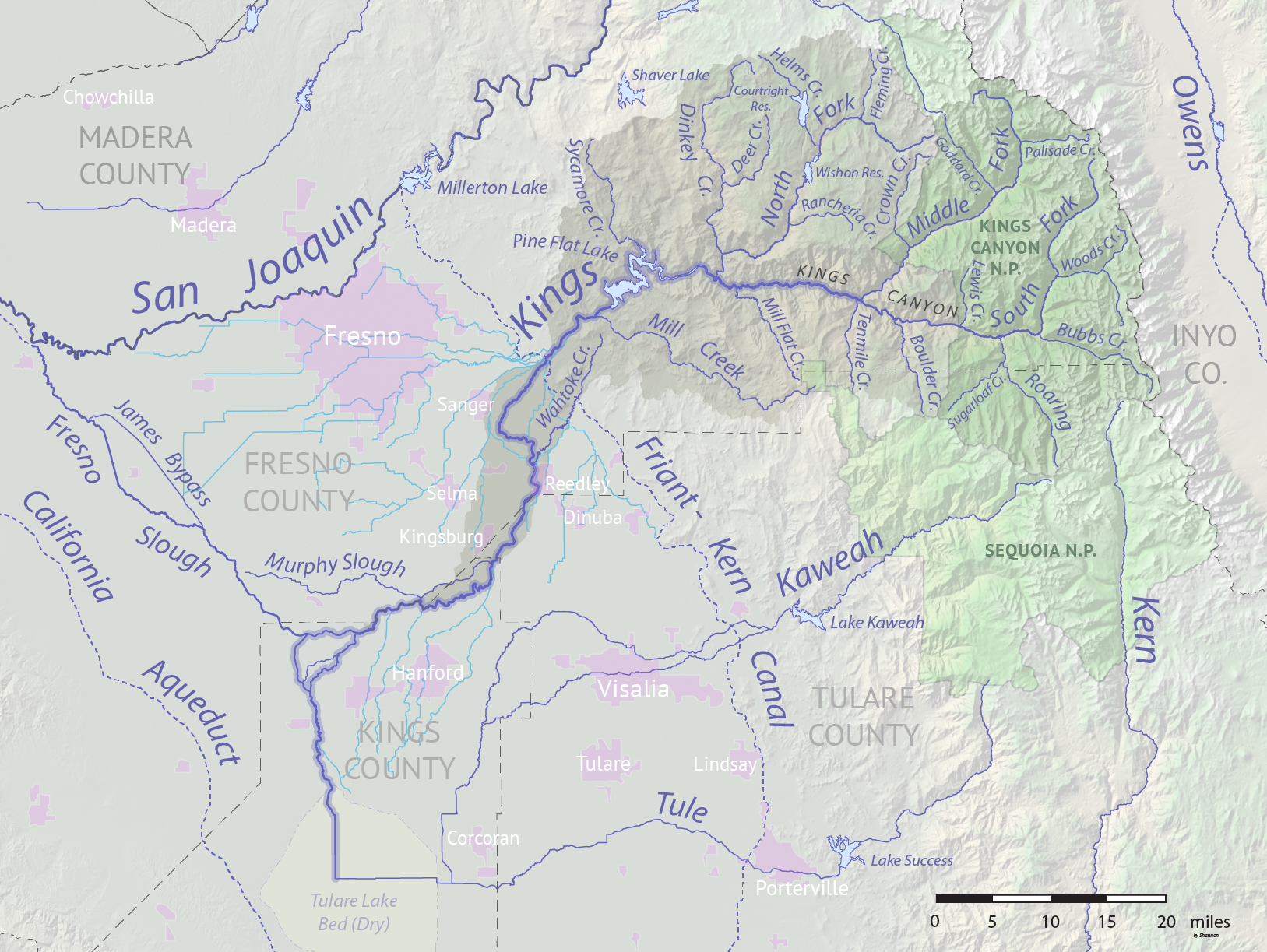
- Map of the Kings River watershed, including the South Fork

Location
- Country: United States
- State: California

Physical characteristics
- Source: Near Mount Bolton Brown
  - location: Sierra Nevada
  - coordinates: 37°01′40″N 118°26′49″W
  - elevation: 11,601 ft (3,536 m)
- Mouth: Kings River
  - location: Kings Canyon
  - coordinates: 36°50′18″N 118°52′30″W
  - elevation: 2,257 ft (688 m)
- Length: 44.1 mi (71.0 km)
- Basin size: 476 sq mi (1,230 km^{2})
- Discharge
  - location: Cedar Grove
  - average: 656 cu ft/s (18.6 m^{3}/s)
  - minimum: 56 cu ft/s (1.6 m^{3}/s)
  - maximum: 13,900 cu ft/s (390 m^{3}/s)

Basin features
- Tributaries
  - left: Woods Creek, Bubbs Creek, Roaring River, Boulder Creek
  - right: Lewis Creek, Grizzly Creek

National Wild and Scenic River
- Type: Wild, Recreational
- Designated: November 3, 1987

The South Fork Kings River is a 44.1-mile (71.0 km) tributary of the Kings River in the Sierra Nevada of Fresno County, California. The river forms part of Kings Canyon, the namesake of Kings Canyon National Park and one of the deepest canyons in North America with a maximum relief of 8,200 feet (2,500 m) from rim to river.

== Course ==
The South Fork is the largest headwater of the Kings River. It originates at an elevation of 11,601 feet (3,536 m) at an unnamed lake in Kings Canyon National Park, south of Mather Pass and west of Split Mountain, in a high alpine basin known as Upper Basin. It flows south, and is paralleled for several miles by the combined Pacific Crest Trail/John Muir Trail. The trail and river separate at a point west of Taboose Pass, where the river turns to the southwest through a deep gorge between Cirque Crest to the northwest and Arrow Ridge to the southeast. To the east, the Muro Blanco cliffs rise more than half a mile (0.8 km) above the river.

The river flows into Paradise Valley, where it flows in a south-southwest direction, and receives Woods Creek from the east directly below a footbridge that carries the Woods Creek Trail over the river. Until this point the river has been more or less continuous whitewater; in Paradise Valley the gradient lessens and the current slows. Below Paradise Valley the river once again flows through a narrow gorge where it drops 100 feet (30 m) over Mist Falls, one of the largest waterfalls in the park.

It then enters Kings Canyon, a glacial valley with a flat meadow floor surrounded by granite cliffs, which has been compared by John Muir and others to Yosemite Valley in terms of appearance and geology. It receives Bubbs Creek, and turns due west, flowing gently through grassy flats including Zumwalt Meadow, occasionally forming rapids where it breaches ancient glacial moraines. It receives its largest tributary, Roaring River, from the south and passes through Cedar Grove, home to many campgrounds and visitor facilities.

Further west the river reaches the deepest part of Kings Canyon, where Highway 180 follows the river closely for several miles, and Boulder Creek enters from the south. Boyden Cavern lies adjacent to the river just above Horseshoe Bend, the steepest and narrowest part of the canyon. The river joins with the Middle Fork Kings River in the Monarch Wilderness, just outside Kings Canyon National Park, to form the main stem of the Kings River.

== Natural history ==
There are records of Chinook salmon presence 10–12 miles above Pine Flat, possibly including the South Fork, before the 1940s. Woodhull and Dill (1942) noted that salmon ascend about 10 to 12 mi beyond the present upper extent of the reservoir and salmon migration in the Kings River probably ascended no farther than the confluence of the North Fork. Yoshiyama and Moyle also noted that there is an undocumented note of "a few salmon" having occurred much farther upstream at Cedar Grove (28 mi above present-day Pine Flat Reservoir) in the past.

According to the California Department of Fish and Game, "many of the waters in the headwaters of the South Fork Kings River and several tributary streams and lakes were also planted with California golden trout from GTC (Golden Trout Creek) between 1909 and 1914." As of 2012 the California Department of Fish and Game fish data base from their surveys indicate that only rainbow trout, brown trout and Sacramento sucker are found in the South Fork Kings River. The Park Service used to stock rainbow trout in the river, but terminated the practice in the 1980s in favor of letting the fishery return to more natural conditions. However, the South Fork is still considered excellent water for fly fishing in Kings Canyon.

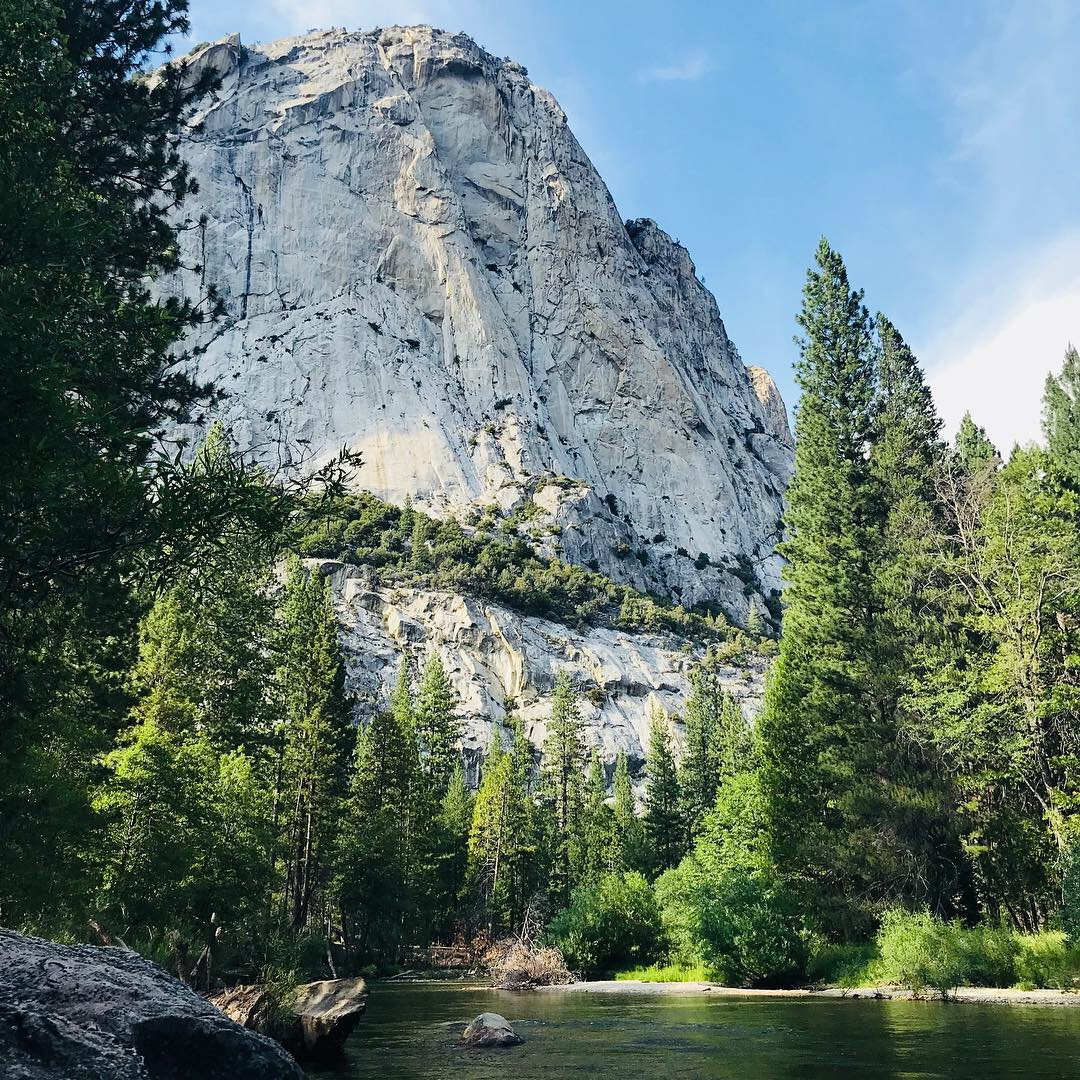
South Fork Kings River in the Kings Canyon

== See also ==
- Middle Fork Kings River
- North Fork Kings River
- List of rivers of California
