= Mount Brewer =

Mountain on the Great Western Divide of the Sierra Nevada in California

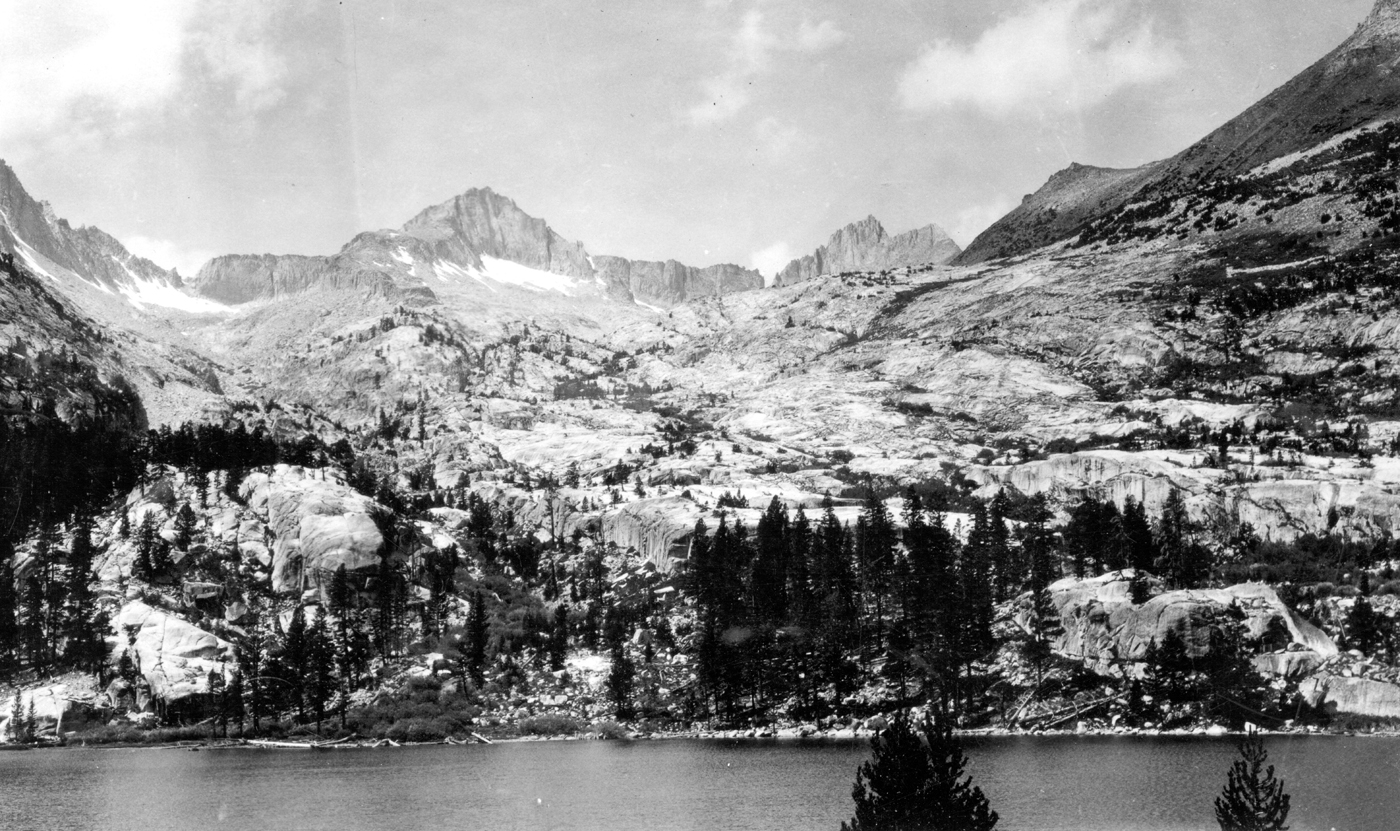
- Mount Brewer from East Lake

Highest point
- Elevation: 13,576 ft (4,138 m) NAVD 88
- Prominence: 1,168 ft (356 m)
- Parent peak: Midway Mountain
- Listing: Ultra-prominent peak; SPS Emblem peak; Western States Climbers Star peak
- Coordinates: 36°42′31″N 118°29′07″W

Geography
- Location: Tulare County, California, U.S.
- Parent range: Sierra Nevada, Great Western Divide
- Topo map: USGS Mount Brewer

Climbing
- First ascent: July 2, 1864 by William H. Brewer and Charles F. Hoffmann
- Easiest route: Easy scramble, class 2

Mount Brewer is on the Great Western Divide, a sub-range of the Sierra Nevada in California. It is located in Kings Canyon National Park,

The peak was named for William Henry Brewer who worked on the first California Geological Survey and was the first Chair of Agriculture at Yale University's Sheffield Scientific School. He was chief of the field party that explored the central High Sierra in 1864.

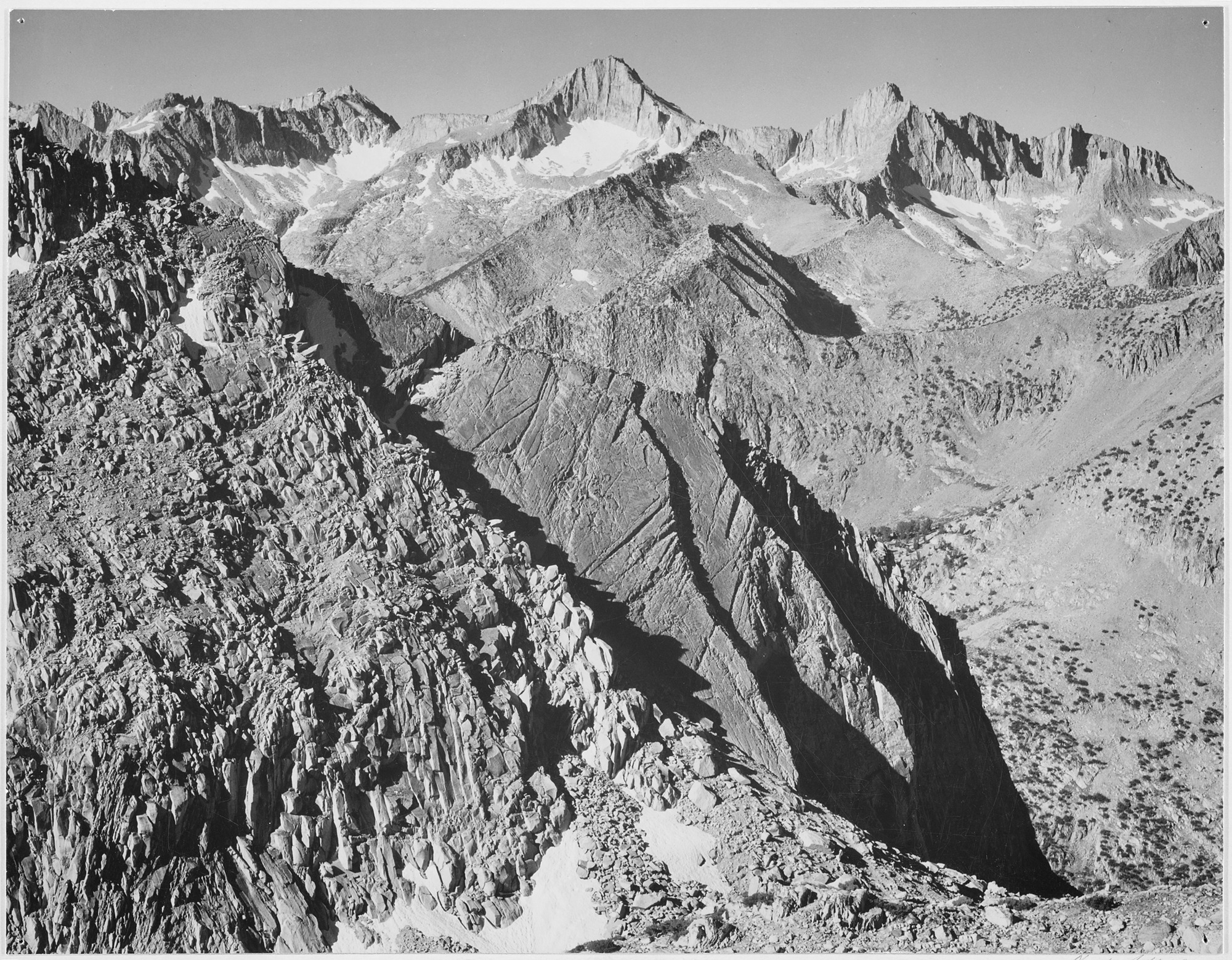
South Guard, Mt. Brewer (center) and North Guard (right), by Ansel Adams ca. 1936

== See also ==
- California 4000 meter peaks
- Thirteener
