= Kaweah =

Kaweah is a word in the ancient Yokuts language that means "crow" or "raven cry". Also a brewery.

Kaweah may also refer to:

== Bodies of water ==
- Kaweah River in Tulare County, California
- Lake Kaweah, a lake near Lemon Cove in Tulare County, California.

== Mountains ==
- Mount Kaweah, a mountain of the Kaweah peaks ridge of California's Sierra Nevada, in Sequoia National Park.
- Black Kaweah, a mountain of the Kaweah peaks ridge of California's Sierra Nevada, in Sequoia National Park.
- Red Kaweah, a mountain of the Kaweah peaks ridge of California's Sierra Nevada, in Sequoia National Park.
- Kaweah Queen, a mountain of the Kaweah peaks ridge of California's Sierra Nevada, in Sequoia National Park.
- Kaweah Gap, a pass through the Great Western Divide, in Sequoia National Park, California.

== Other ==
- Kaweah Indian Nation, California-based nonprofit
- Kaweah Colony, utopian Socialist community in central California during the 1880s
- USS Kaweah (AO-15), replenishment oiler ship in the United States Navy
- Kaweah Bar, race horse

== See also ==
- Cahuilla (disambiguation)
- Coahuila, a state of Mexico
