= Picket Guard Peak =

Mountain in the state of California

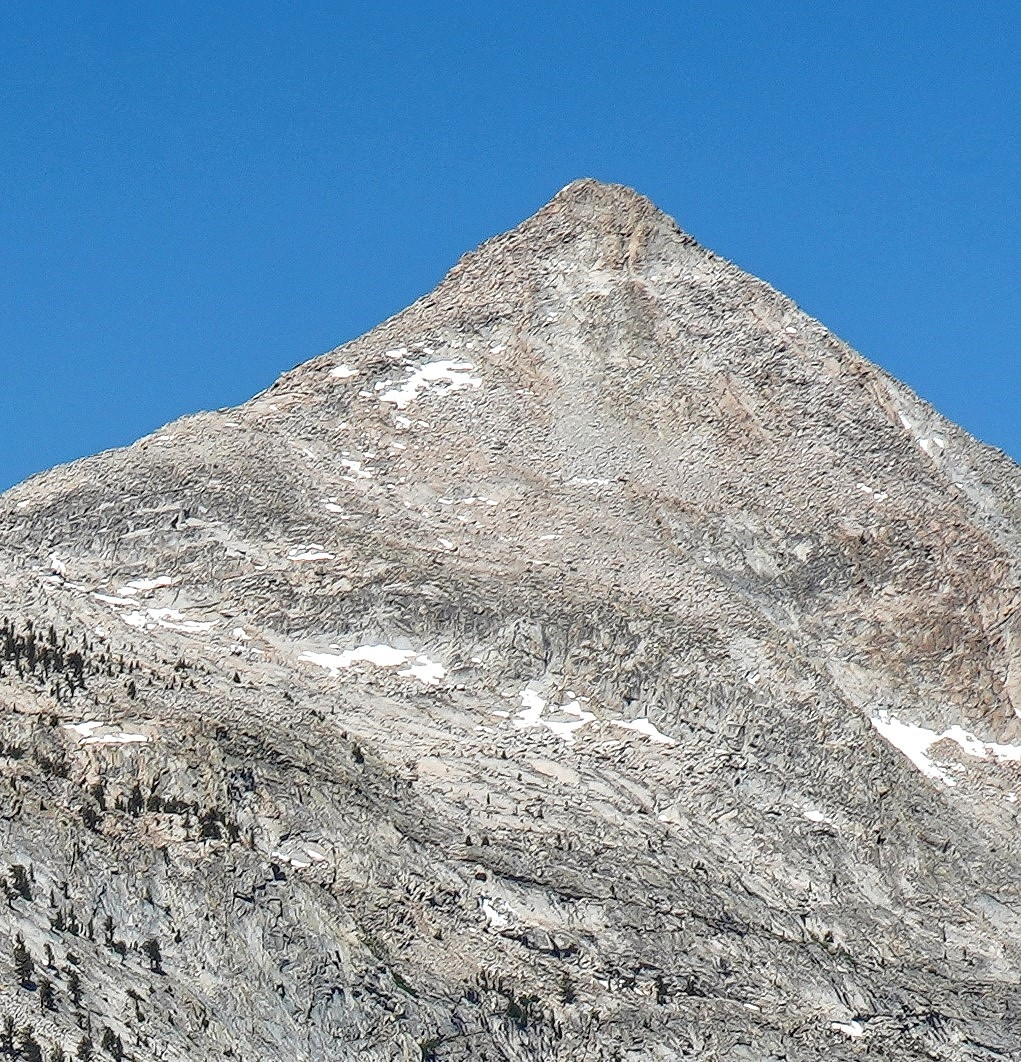
- East aspect

Highest point
- Elevation: 12,302 ft (3,750 m)
- Prominence: 459 ft (140 m)
- Isolation: 1.54 mi (2.48 km)
- Listing: Sierra Peaks Section
- Coordinates: 36°34′36″N 118°28′20″W

Naming
- Etymology: Picket guard

Geography
- Location within California Location within the United States
- Location: Sequoia National Park; Tulare County, California, U.S.
- Parent range: Sierra Nevada
- Topo map: USGS Mount Kaweah

Geology
- Rock age: Cretaceous
- Mountain type: Fault block
- Rock type: Granodiorite

Climbing
- First ascent: 1936
- Easiest route: class 2 East Ridge

Picket Guard Peak is a 12,302-foot-elevation (3,750-meter) mountain summit located west of the crest of the Sierra Nevada mountain range in Tulare County, California, United States. It is situated in Sequoia National Park, two miles southwest of Kern Point, 3.4 miles (5.5 km) north of Mount Kaweah, and three miles east of the junction of Kaweah Peaks Ridge with Great Western Divide. Picket Guard Peak ranks as the 345th-highest summit in California, and topographic relief is significant as the summit rises 4,265 feet (1,300 meters) above Kern Canyon in approximately three miles.

== History ==
William Russel Dudley, writing in the Sierra Club Bulletin in 1898: "There is a fine pyramidal peak at the eastern end of the third range, which was always in the background of the view as we entered and ascended the narrow cleft of the Kern-Kaweah. This was named the Picket Guard." This landform's toponym was officially adopted in 1928 by the U.S. Board on Geographic Names.

The first ascent of the summit was made August 1, 1936, by C. Dohlman, H. Manheim, and B. Breeding. Except for the north cirque, an ascent of the peak is non-technical, and inclusion on the Sierra Peaks Section peakbagging list generates climbing interest in this remote peak.

== Climate ==
According to the Köppen climate classification system, Picket Guard Peak is located in an alpine climate zone. Most weather fronts originate in the Pacific Ocean, and travel east toward the Sierra Nevada mountains. As fronts approach, they are forced upward by the peaks (orographic lift), causing them to drop their moisture in the form of rain or snowfall onto the range. Precipitation runoff from this mountain drains east to the Kern River via Picket Creek and Kern-Kaweah River.

== See also ==
- List of mountain peaks of California

== Gallery ==
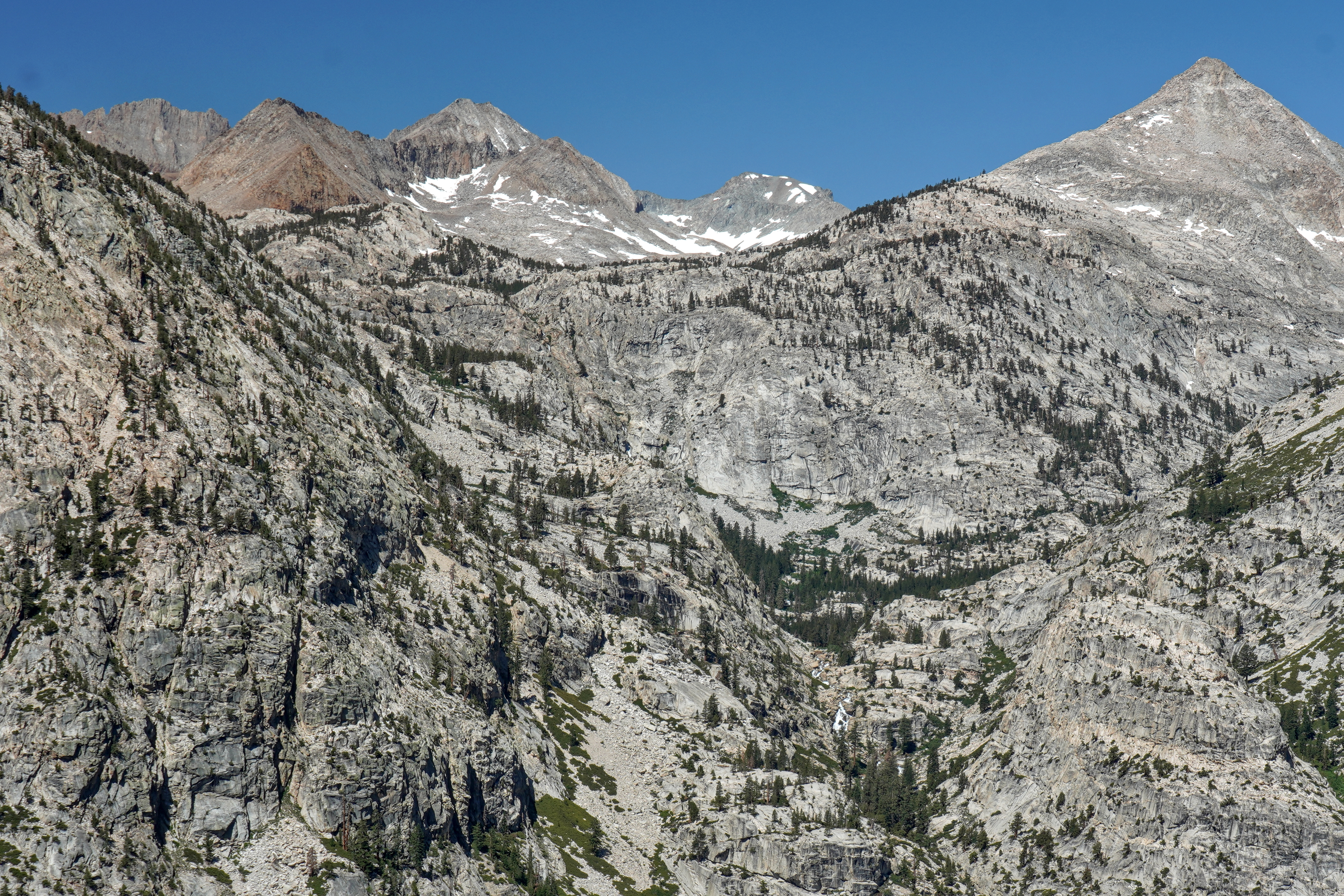
Picket Guard Peak in upper right corner

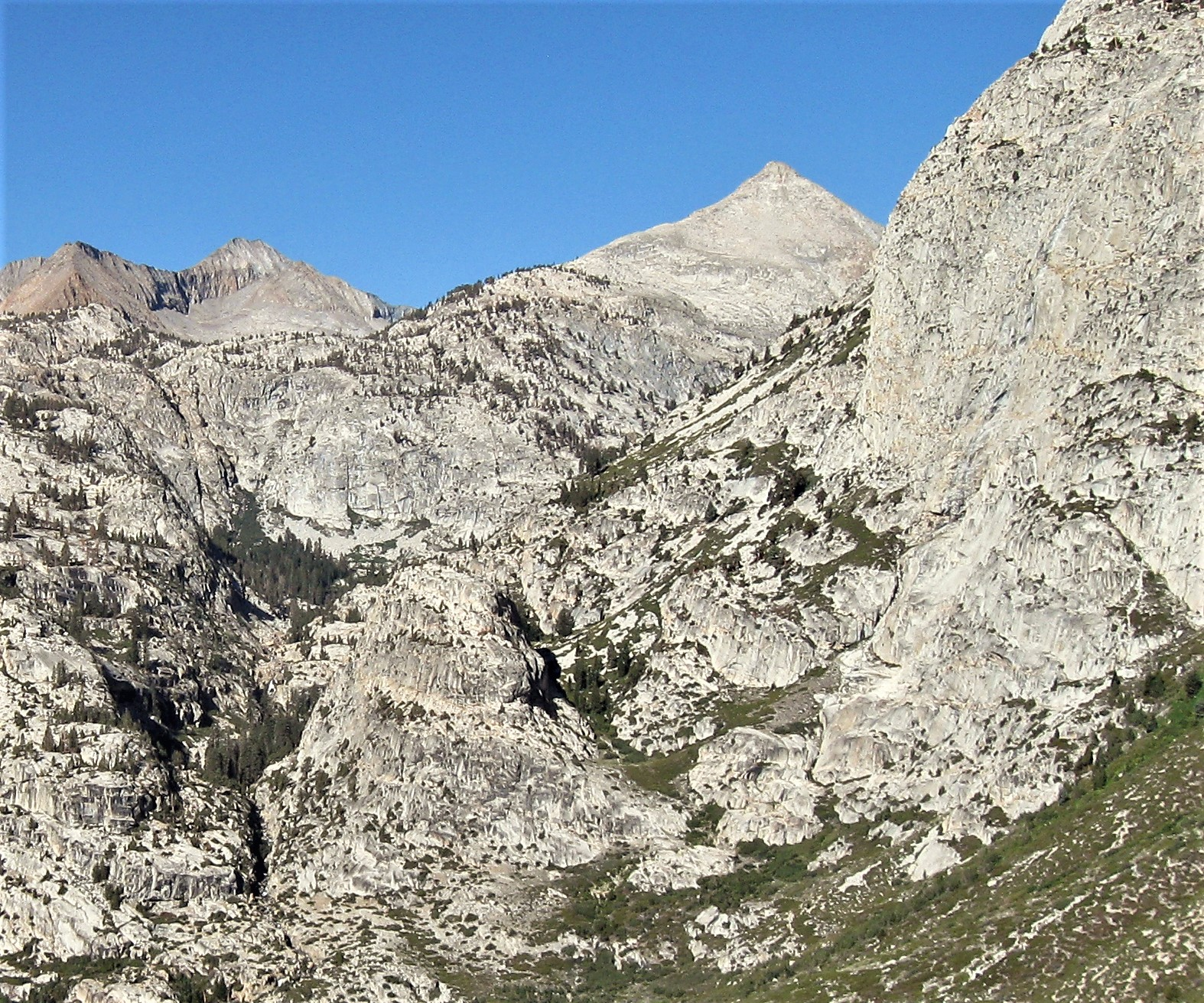
Picket Guard Peak right of center

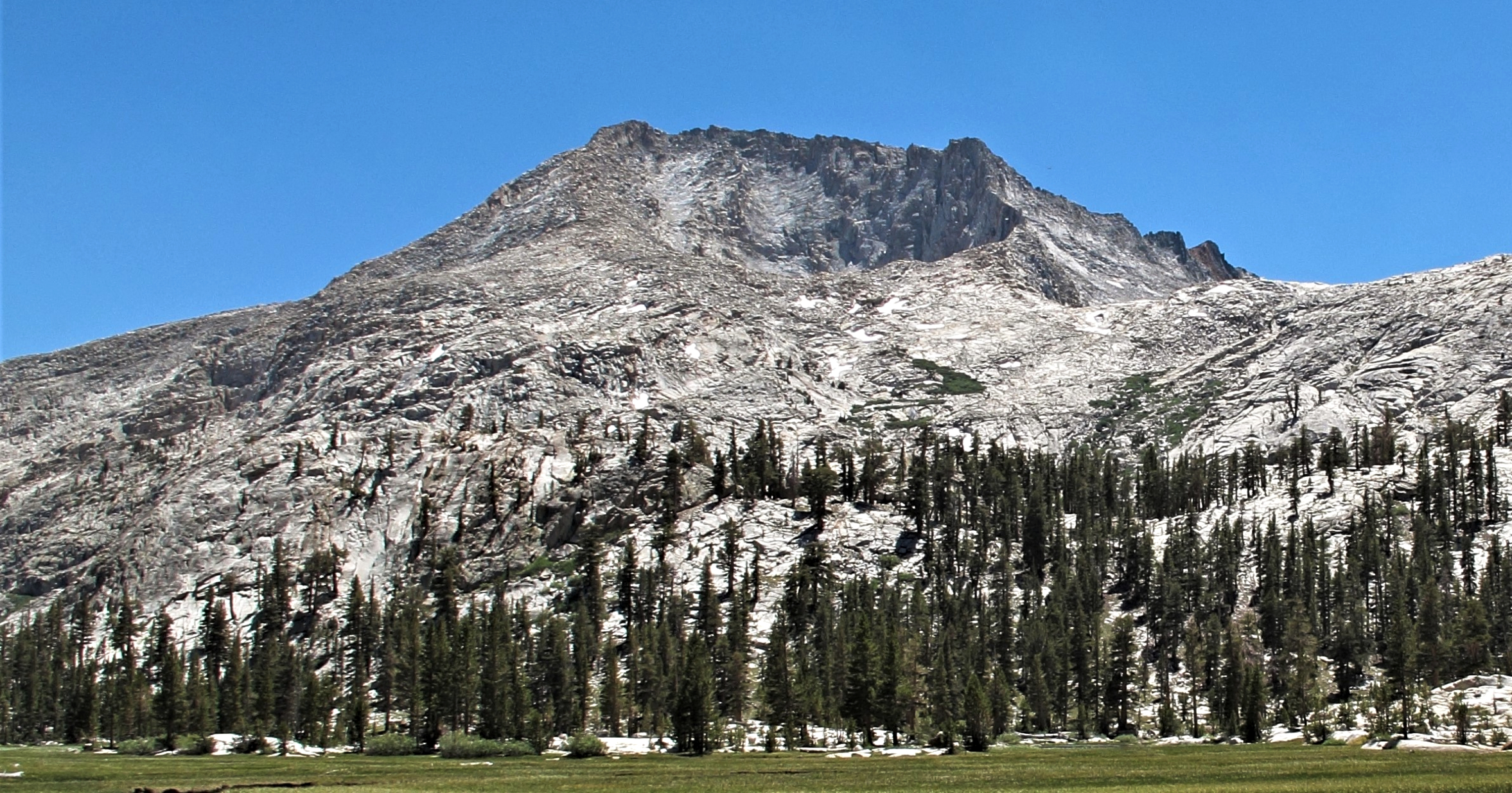
North aspect

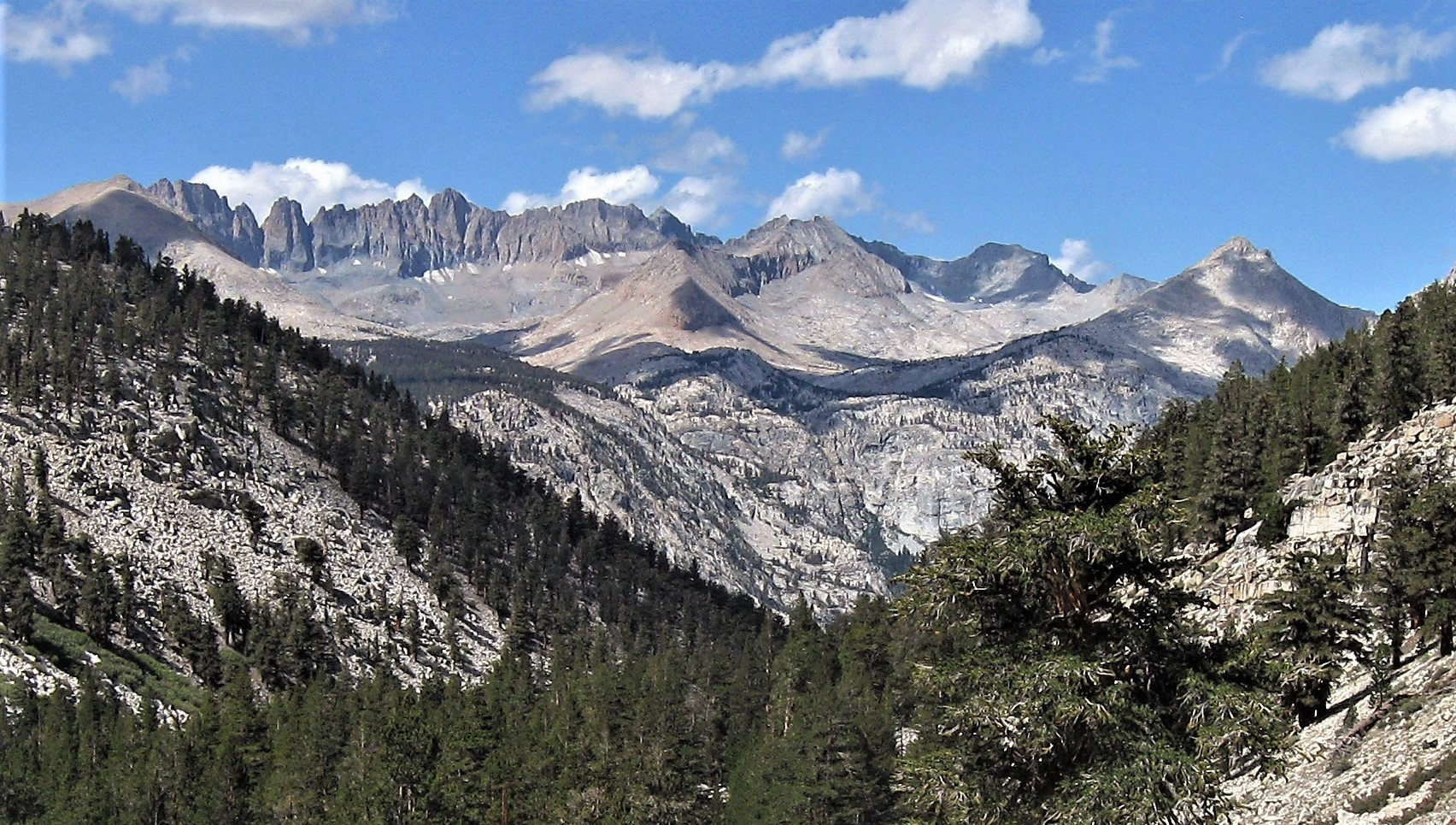
Kaweah Peaks Ridge with Picket Guard Peak to right
