= Mount Stewart (California) =

Mountain in the American state of California

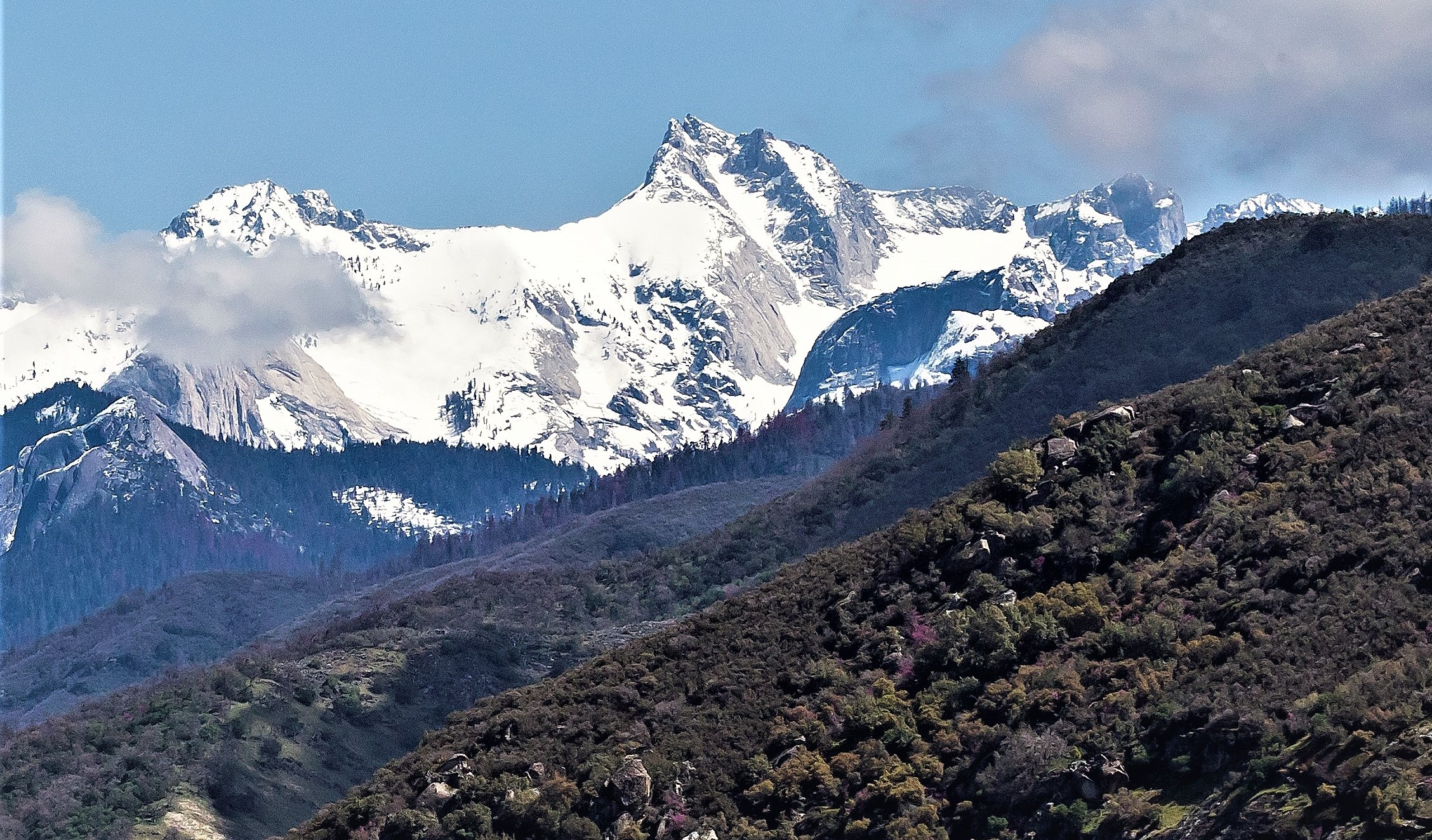
- West aspect

Highest point
- Elevation: 12,205+ ft (3721+ m) NAVD 88
- Prominence: 440 ft (134 m)
- Listing: Sierra Peaks Section
- Coordinates: 36°34′11″N 118°33′16″W

Geography
- Location within California
- Location: Tulare County, California, U.S.
- Parent range: Sierra Nevada
- Topo map: USGS Triple Divide Peak

Climbing
- First ascent: 1932 by Norman Clyde
- Easiest route: Scramble, class 2

Mount Stewart is on the Great Western Divide, a sub-range of the Sierra Nevada in California. It is located in Sequoia National Park, 2.1 miles (3.4 km) southeast of Triple Divide Peak and 2.7 miles (4.3 km) northwest of Black Kaweah. The High Sierra Trail traverses Kaweah Gap south of the summit, and Lilliput Glacier is on the mountain's northern flank.

The mountain is named for George W. Stewart, editor of Visalia Delta. Stewart was the leader of a campaign to protect the "Big Trees". Francis P. Farquhar, author and former president of the Sierra Club, credits Stewart as "the father" of Sequoia National Park.

== Climate ==
According to the Köppen climate classification system, Mount Stewart is located in an alpine climate zone. Most weather fronts originate in the Pacific Ocean, and travel east toward the Sierra Nevada mountains. As fronts approach, they are forced upward by the peaks (orographic lift), causing them to drop their moisture in the form of rain or snowfall onto the range.
