= Cahuilla (disambiguation) =

The Cahuilla are a Native American people of Southern California.

Cahuilla may also refer to:

- Cahuilla, California, an unincorporated community in Riverside County, California
- Cahuilla Band of Mission Indians of the Cahuilla Reservation
- Cahuilla County, California, a proposed county in Southern California
- Cahuilla language, the language of the Cahuilla people
- USS Cahuilla (ATF-152), a US Navy ship

== See also ==
- Coahuila, a state of Mexico
- Kaweah (disambiguation)
- Lake Cahuilla
