= Midway Mountain =

Mountain in the state of California

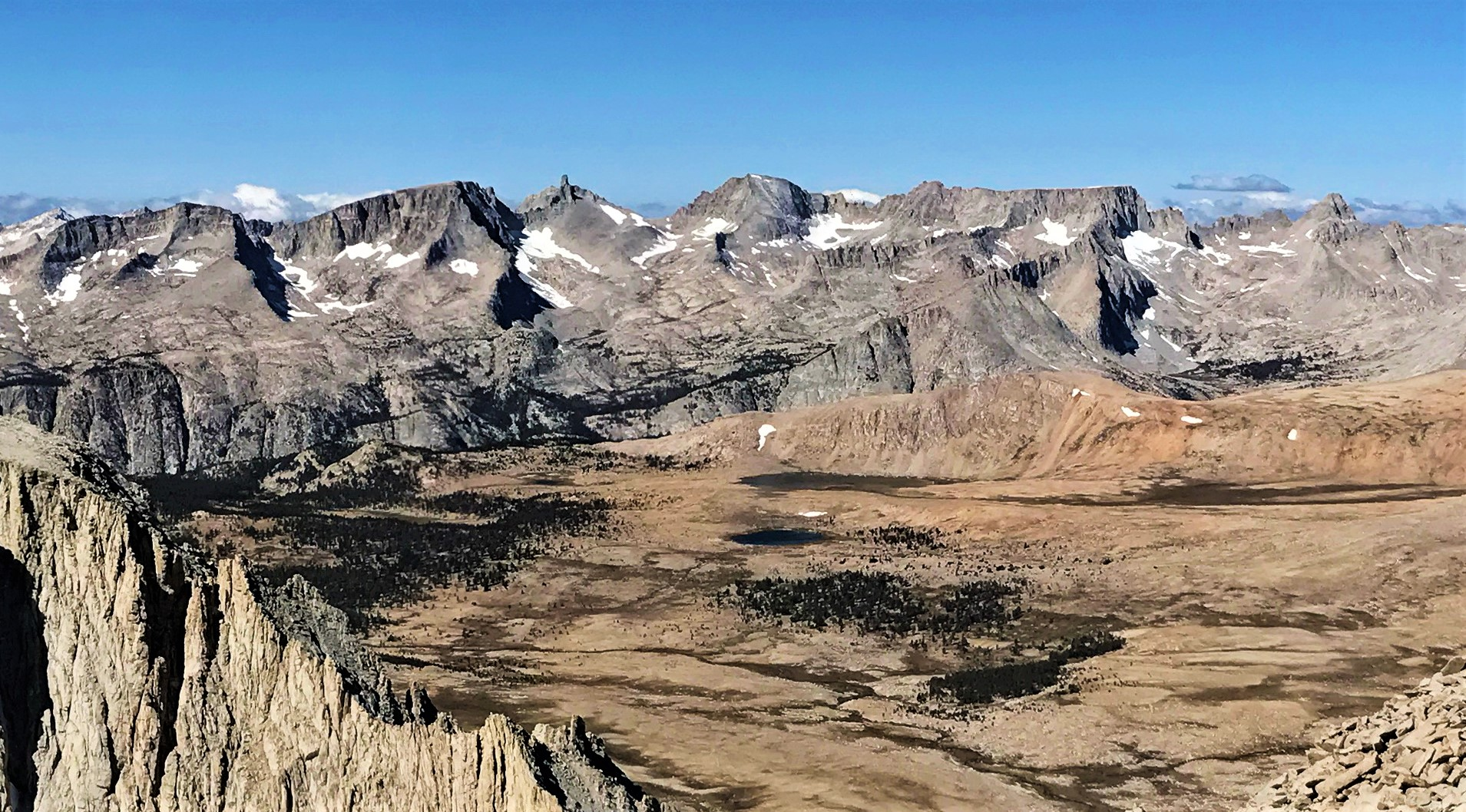
- Midway Mountain centered, east aspect (Milestone Mtn to left, Table Mtn to right)

Highest point
- Elevation: 13,665 ft (4,165 m)
- Prominence: 1,329 ft (405 m)
- Parent peak: Mount Stanford (13,979 ft)
- Isolation: 6.04 mi (9.72 km)
- Listing: Sierra Peaks Section
- Coordinates: 36°38′36″N 118°29′01″W

Geography
- Location within California Location within the United States
- Location: Sequoia National Park; Tulare County; California, U.S.
- Parent range: Sierra Nevada; Great Western Divide
- Topo map: USGS Mount Brewer

Geology
- Rock age: Cretaceous
- Mountain type: Fault block
- Rock type: granitic

Climbing
- First ascent: 1912
- Easiest route: class 2 East face

Midway Mountain is a remote 13,665-foot-elevation (4,165-meter) mountain summit located on the Great Western Divide of the Sierra Nevada mountain range, in Tulare County of northern California. It is set on the common boundary that Kings Canyon National Park shares with Sequoia National Park, and is situated 0.6 miles (0.97 km) southwest of Table Mountain, and 0.6 mile north of Milestone Mountain. Midway Mountain ranks as the 39th-highest summit in California, and the highest point on the central Great Western Divide. It would be the highest of the entire Great Western Divide if the Kaweah Peaks were excluded. Topographic relief is significant as the west aspect rises over 4,800 feet (1,500 meters) above Cloud Canyon in three miles, and the east aspect rises over 3,800 feet (1,200 meters) above the Kern River in three miles.

== History ==
This mountain was originally named "Mount Michaelis" in 1881 to honor Captain Otho Ernest Michaelis (1843–1890), US Army. Michaelis was the first white man to discover the body of General Custer following the Battle of the Little Bighorn. The Mt. Whitney USGS 30' maps published in 1905 and 1937 show this geographical feature without any name, although Milestone and Table Mountains were marked as such.

The first ascent of the summit was made in 1912 by Francis P. Farquhar, William Edward Colby, and Robert M. Price. This same trio of Sierra Club pioneers also made the first ascent of nearby Milestone Mountain on July 14, 1912. Midway's south face was first climbed in 1987 by Mark Hoffman and Robin Ingraham, Jr.

== Climate ==
Midway Mountain is located in an alpine climate zone. Most weather fronts originate in the Pacific Ocean, and travel east toward the Sierra Nevada mountains. As fronts approach, they are forced upward by the peaks, causing them to drop their moisture in the form of rain or snowfall onto the range (orographic lift). Precipitation runoff from the east side of the mountain drains to Kern River via Milestone Creek, and west to the Roaring River.

== See also ==
- List of mountain peaks of California
