= Lion Rock (disambiguation) =

Lion Rock is a hill in Hong Kong.

Lion Rock or variant, may also refer to:

- Lion Rock (California), a summit in Tulare County, California
- Lion Rock, a rock in Wenatchee National Forest, Washington at 47.251242°N 120.589757°W -->
- Lion Rock, a sea stack in Clatsop County, Oregon
- Lion Rock, a rock and a township on Ulleungdo Island, South Korea at 37.469738°N 130.831051°E -->
- Lion Rock (New Zealand), a prominent landmark at Piha
- Sigiriya, a site in Sri Lanka
- Lionrock, a star in the constellation Aquarius
- Lionrock, a British big beat music group
- Typhoon Lionrock, a list of storms with this name

== See also ==
- Lion (disambiguation)
- Rock (disambiguation)
