= Table Mountain (Tulare County, California) =

Mountain in the American state of California

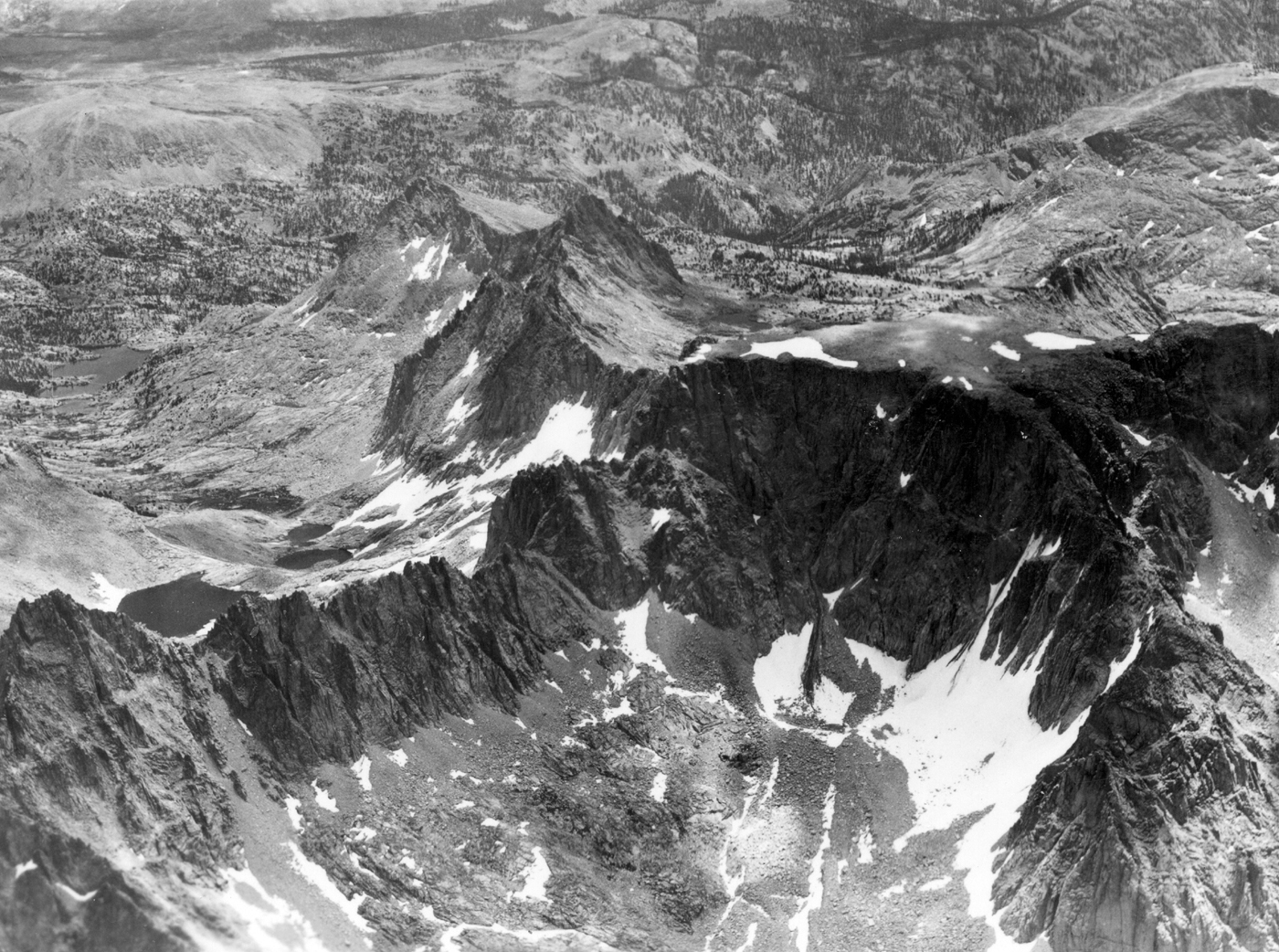
- Table Mountain, aerial view

Highest point
- Elevation: 13,627 ft (4,154 m) NAVD 88
- Prominence: 509 ft (155 m)
- Parent peak: Midway Mountain
- Listing: SPS Mountaineers peak
- Coordinates: 36°39′38″N 118°28′26″W

Geography
- Location: Tulare County, California, U.S.
- Parent range: Sierra Nevada
- Topo map: USGS Mount Brewer

Climbing
- First ascent: August 25, 1908 by Gilbert Hassell, Fred Shoup & Paul Shoup
- Easiest route: Moderate scramble, class 3 by Southeast Side or West Ridge, South Side

Table Mountain is located near the northern end of the Great Western Divide, a sub-range of the Sierra Nevada in California. The summit marks a point on the boundary between Sequoia and Kings Canyon National Parks and is 0.6 miles (1 km) south of Thunder Mountain and 1.3 miles (2.1 km) northeast of Midway Mountain.

Clarence King of the Whitney Survey mentioned in his notes that "At one place the ridge [Great Western Divide] forms a level table." The name Table appeared on Charles F. Hoffmann's map of 1873. In 1881 the mountain was named Mount Hazen in honor of General Hazen, the Chief Signal Officer of the U.S. Army. In 1905, the Board on Geographic Names recognized the name Table Mountain. This name appeared on both the Tehipite and the Mt. Whitney USGS 30' maps published in 1905 and 1907 respectively.

It is the tallest of the 21 peaks named Table Mountain in California.

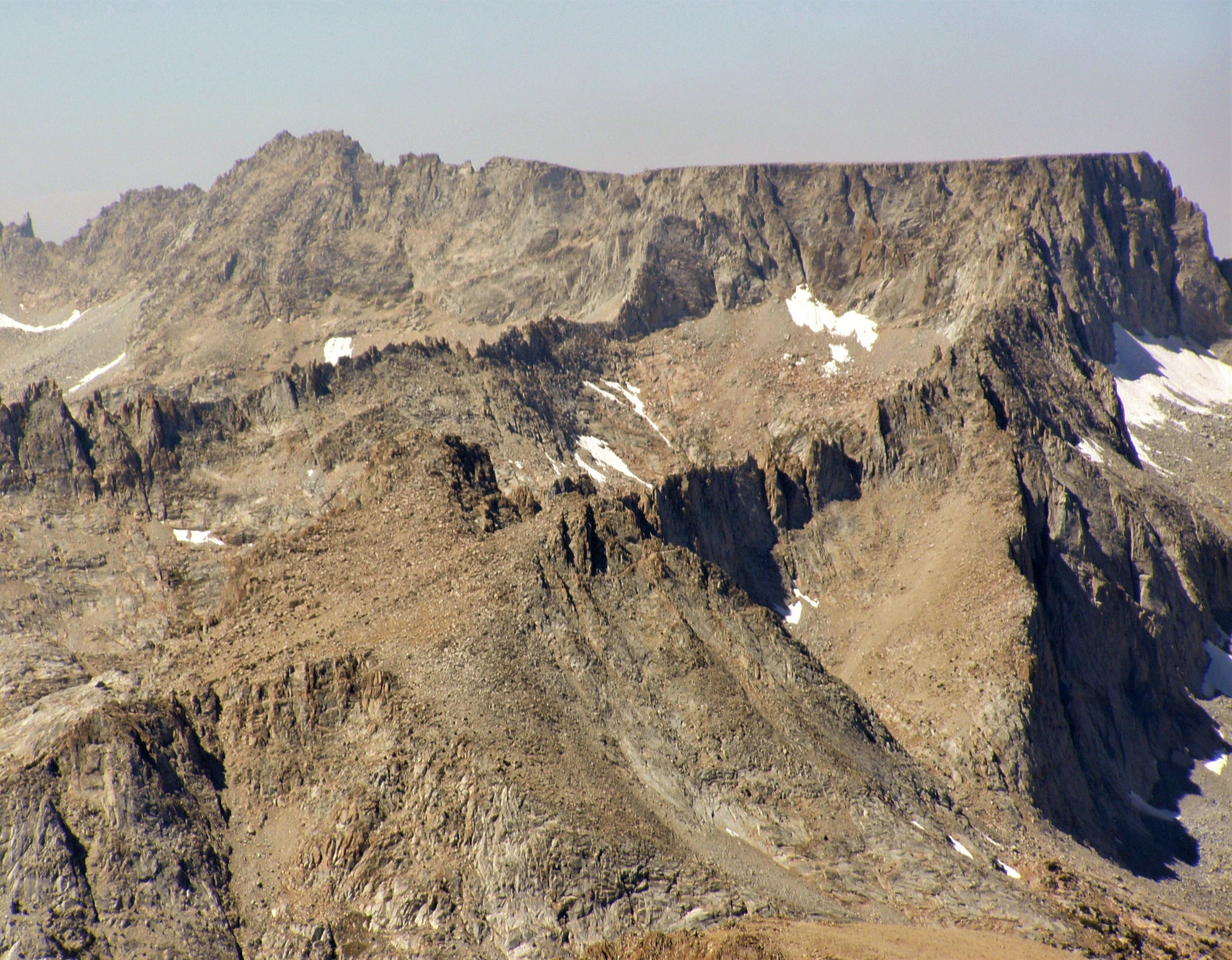
Table Mountain, east aspect, from Mt. Tyndall
