= Milestone Mountain =

Mountain in the American state of California

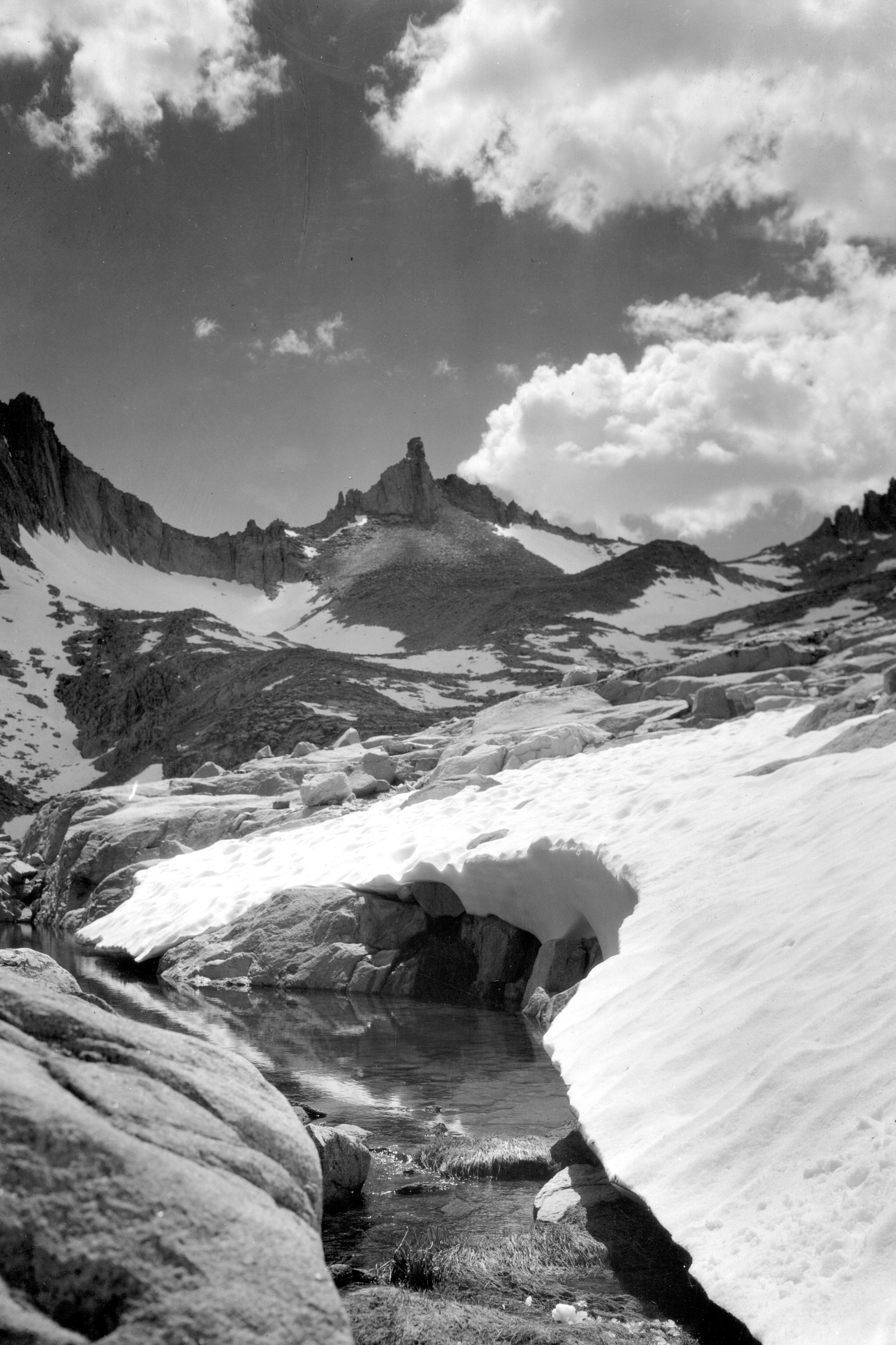
- Milestone Mountain, July 1932 (East Side)

Highest point
- Elevation: 13,644 ft (4,159 m) NAVD 88
- Prominence: 711 ft (217 m)
- Parent peak: Midway Mountain
- Listing: SPS Mountaineers peak; Western States Climbers Star peak
- Coordinates: 36°38′05″N 118°29′07″W

Geography
- Location within California Location within the United States
- Location: Tulare County, California, U.S.
- Parent range: Great Western Divide
- Topo map: USGS Mount Brewer

Climbing
- First ascent: July 14, 1912 by William E. Colby, Francis Farquhar and Robert Price.
- Easiest route: Exposed scramble, class 3

Milestone Mountain is a thirteener on the Great Western Divide, a subrange of the Sierra Nevada. The summit marks a point on the boundary between Sequoia and Kings Canyon national parks. It is 0.6 miles (0.97 km) south of Midway Mountain and 3.8 miles (6.1 km) northeast of Triple Divide Peak. It takes its name from the shape of the obelisk on its peak, and has been called this since at least 1873.
