= Lilliput Glacier =

Glacier in California, United States

- Location within California Location within the United States
- Type: Mountain glacier
- Location: Mount Stewart, Sequoia National Park, Tulare County, California, U.S.
- Coordinates: 36°34′53″N 118°33′07″W
- Area: 0.05 km^{2} (0.019 sq mi)
- Length: .16 km (0.099 mi)
- Terminus: Talus
- Status: Retreating

Lilliput Glacier is the smallest named glacier in the Sierra Nevada of California. The glacier has an area of .05 km^{2} (0.019 sq mi), which is approximately 12.2 acres. In terms of area this is about the size of 48 typical suburb (1/4 acre or approx. 100' × 100') lots that single family homes are built on. This glacier lies on the shaded north-facing vertical cliff of Mount Stewart and is the southernmost named glacier in the United States.

== See also ==
- List of glaciers in the United States
