= Paul Shoup House =

Historic house in California, United States

- U.S. National Register of Historic Places
- Los Altos Designated Historic Landmark
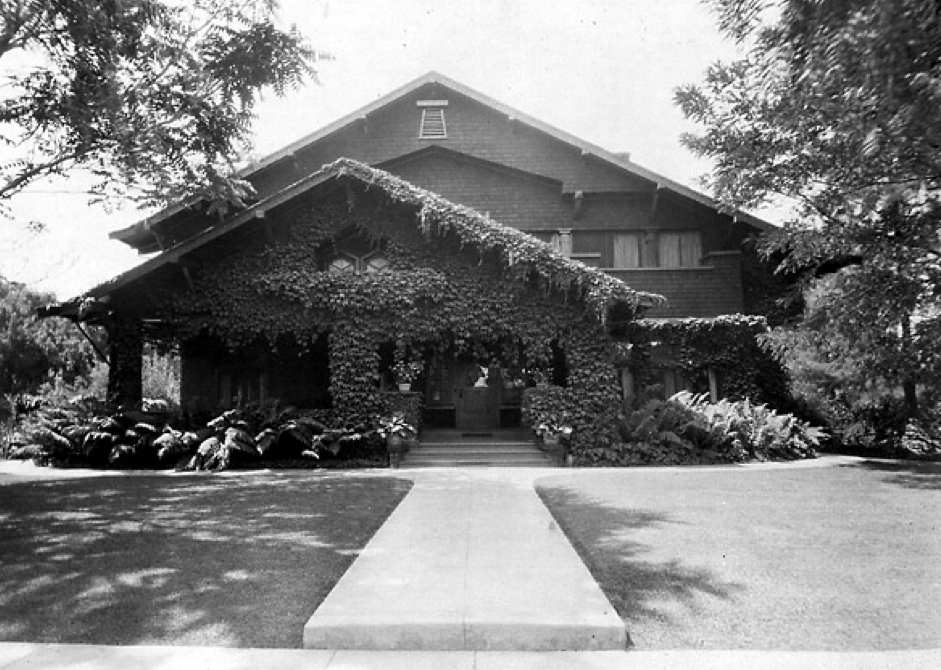
- Paul Shoup House circa 1920

- Location within California
- Location: 500 University Avenue, Los Altos, California
- Coordinates: 37°22′25.5″N 122°7′6″W
- Area: 0.6 acres (0.24 ha)
- Built: 1910
- Architect: Wolfe & MacKenzie
- Architectural style: American Craftsman
- Website: www.patrickcopeland.org/psh
- NRHP reference No.: 11000696

Significant dates
- Additions: Circa 1925, 1990
- Lot subdivided: 1980, 2000
- Rehabilitated: November 2010
- Added to NRHP: September 23, 2011

The Paul Shoup House, also known as the Shoup House, is a historic residence in Los Altos, Santa Clara County, California, United States. It was built as an American Craftsman- and Shingle-style home in 1910 for railroad executive Paul Shoup. In 2011 it was designated a historic site by the National Register of Historic Places; the first such designation in Los Altos.

== Building site and architectural description ==
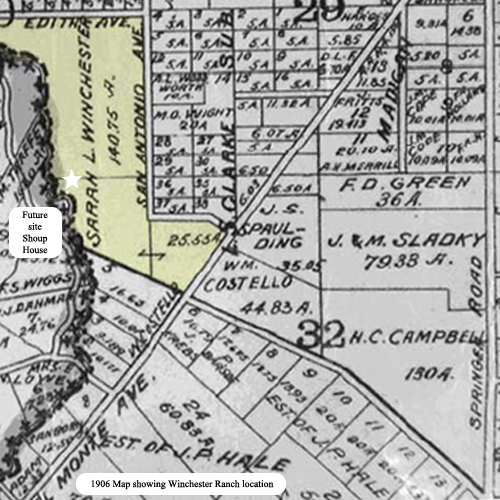
Future site of Paul Shoup House on Winchester Ranch (1906 Mountain View map)

The house is a two-story Craftsman residence completed in 1910, on a multi-acre lot within the Los Altos Land Company's holding, acquired from Sarah Winchester in 1907.

The wood shingle-clad building originally occupied a trapezoidal lot that crossed Adobe Creek. The building now sits on reduced acreage that retains its relationship with the creek, surrounded by denser residential development.

A century after its construction, the house retains many original wooden windows and wooden decorative features such as brackets, bell eaves, decorative vents, and a dramatic overall form. Hardscape features including the concrete retaining wall and a stone grotto were still in place.

The original front door, antique Venetian light, Douglas fir floors, paneling, beams, fireplace mantels, door and window trim, brass hardware, and antique glazing are intact in the foyer, dining and living rooms. The Douglas fir door trim throughout the house is six inches wide with a curved radius: a transitional design bridging the Victorian and American Craftsman styles.

== Residents ==
Paul Shoup (1874–1946) was president and later vice-chairman of the Southern Pacific Railroad in the 1920s and 1930s, a founding board member of the Stanford University School of Business, and founder of the community of Los Altos.

Shoup's son Carl Sumner Shoup lived in the home in his youth, riding his horse to school. Carl was a Columbia University economist considered the intellectual father of the value-added tax (VAT). At the request of General Douglas MacArthur, Carl led the Shoup Mission that recommended the tax policy adopted by the Diet of Japan in 1950 during the economic reconstruction of Japan after World War II.

Living with Shoup garden caretaker Shoichi Kagawa on the property was his eldest son Bunichi Kagawa. Influenced by Los Altan and Stanford professor Yvor Winters, issei Bunichi Kagawa became a writer penning poetry in both his native Japanese and in English, collected in the 1930 volume Hidden Flame.

== Rehabilitation and celebrations ==
=== Rehabilitation ===
The city approved a restoration of the home in time to be completed for the centennial. Changes were made to the interior of the house, bringing the house up to modern earthquake, plumbing, and electrical codes while reconfiguring the non-historic kitchen and bathrooms. Lead paint was stripped, and the wood stained to match the basement door finish, unchanged through the years. The Japanese-influenced garden was designed with plants that would have been used in the 1920s and dry-set stonework was used for landscape terracing.

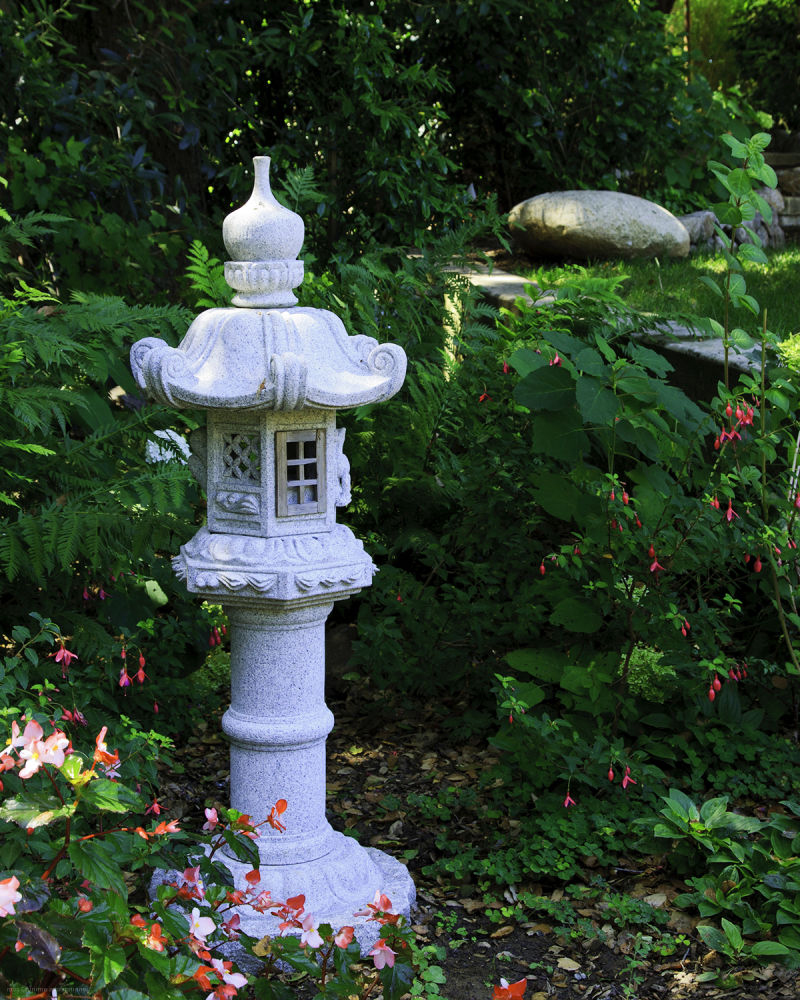
Japanese influenced garden dedicated to Shoichi Kagawa

=== Centennial celebration ===
After the rehabilitation was complete, the house was blessed by a local Catholic priest, and then was the venue for a Shoup centennial celebration hosted by the Jennings family for the benefit of the Los Altos History Museum. During the celebration, Shoup and Kagawa family members retold stories of visiting the house, and living on the property. The centennial included a "family reunion" with several generations of Shoup family members attending from Europe, New Hampshire, Denver, the Northwest, and other parts of California. During the centennial weekend, archival materials were opened for review at the Los Altos History Museum.

=== Garden dedications ===
The Los Altos History Museum and the current homeowners recognized Rose Wilson Shoup, the wife of Paul Shoup, by dedicating a rose garden to the original "Mother of Los Altos.".

In May 2011 the historic grotto across Adobe Creek from the house was dedicated to Shoichi Kagawa who was the chief gardener and caretaker of the Japanese garden. He and his family lived on the property until they were sent to Heart Mountain to be interned during World War II.

== Recognition ==
Homeowners Bill and Tricia Jennings applied for National Register status on behalf of the Paul Shoup House with assistance from Garavaglia Architecture, Inc. of San Francisco. Their application was successful and the house was listed in the National Register of Historic Places on September 23, 2011; the first Los Altos property to be added into the register. The house's nomination to the National Register was based on the significance of the original owner, Paul Shoup.
