= Kern Point =

Mountain in the state of California

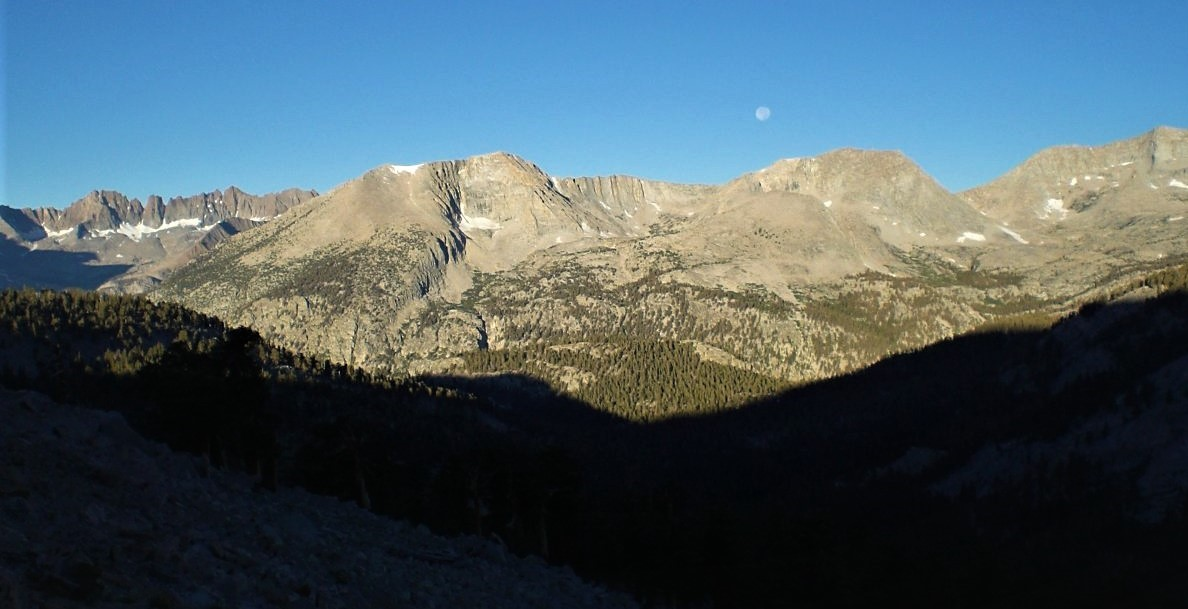
- East aspect, left of center

Highest point
- Elevation: 12,763 ft (3,890 m)
- Prominence: 427 ft (130 m)
- Parent peak: Kern Ridge, West (13,185 ft)
- Isolation: 1.99 mi (3.20 km)
- Listing: Sierra Peaks Section
- Coordinates: 36°35′48″N 118°26′42″W

Naming
- Etymology: Edward Kern

Geography
- Location within California Location within the United States
- Location: Sequoia National Park; Tulare County, California, U.S.
- Parent range: Sierra Nevada
- Topo map: USGS Mount Kaweah

Geology
- Rock age: Cretaceous
- Mountain type: Fault block
- Rock type: Granodiorite

Climbing
- First ascent: 1924
- Easiest route: class 2

Kern Point is a 12,763-foot-elevation (3,890-meter) mountain summit located west of the crest of the Sierra Nevada mountain range in Tulare County, California. It is situated in Sequoia National Park, two miles northeast of Picket Guard Peak, and seven miles east of Mount Whitney. Kern Point ranks as the 220th-highest summit in California, and topographic relief is significant as the summit rises over 4,700 feet (1,400 meters) above Kern River in two miles. Kern Point is the southernmost peak on Kern Ridge, and precipitation runoff from this mountain drains to the Kern River. The river was named by John C. Frémont for Edward Kern, the artist and topographer of Frémont's third expedition in 1845. The Kern Point toponym was officially adopted in 1928 by the U.S. Board on Geographic Names.

== Climbing ==
The first ascent of the summit was made July 25, 1924, by William Horsfall and C. Laughlin. Inclusion on the Sierra Peaks Section peakbagging list generates climbing interest in this remote peak.

== Climate ==
According to the Köppen climate classification system, Kern Point is located in an alpine climate zone. Most weather fronts originate in the Pacific Ocean, and travel east toward the Sierra Nevada mountains. As fronts approach, they are forced upward by the peaks (orographic lift), causing them to drop their moisture in the form of rain or snowfall onto the range.

== See also ==
- Sequoia-Kings Canyon Wilderness
