= Lion Rock (California) =

Mountain in California, United States

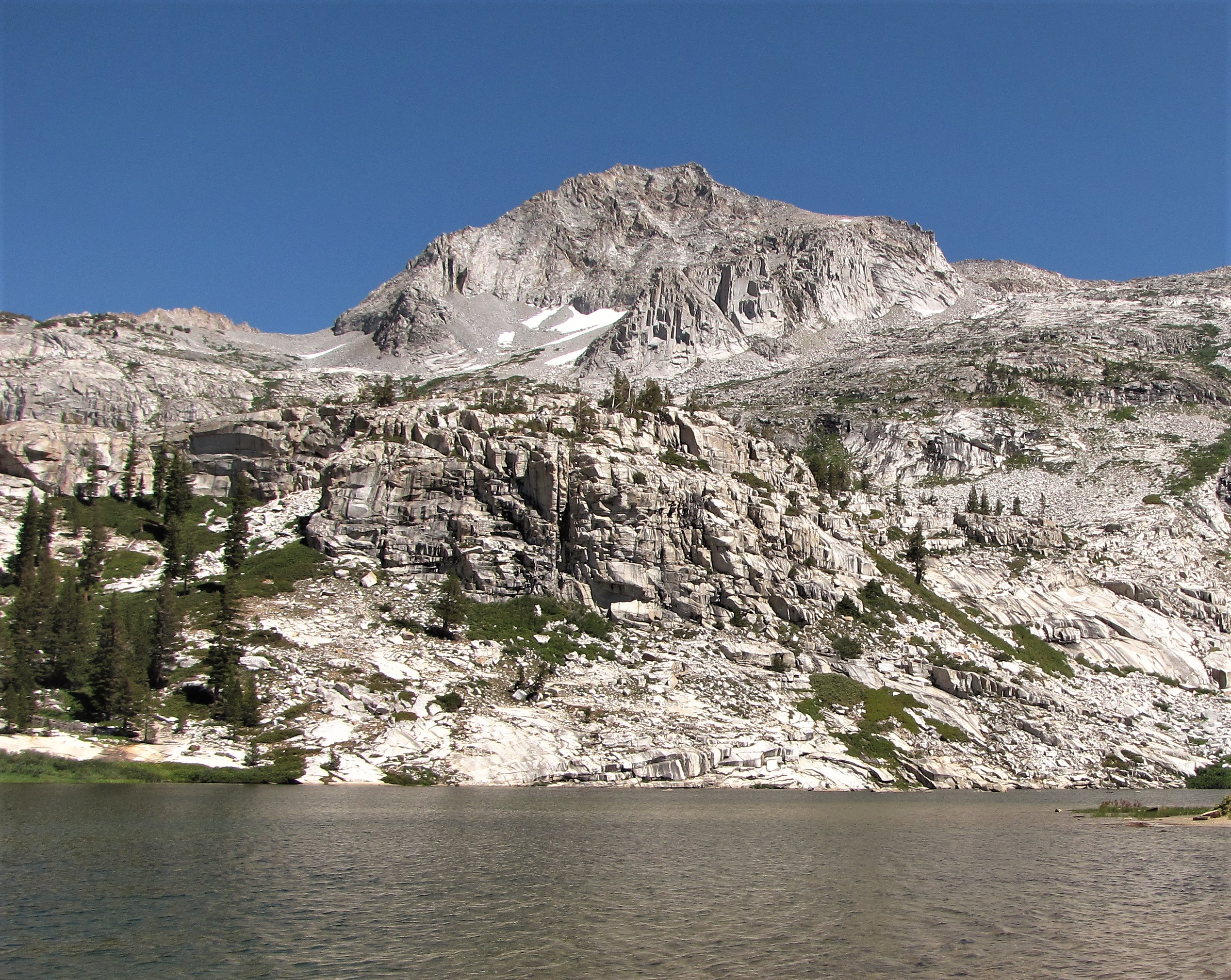
- West aspect, from Tamarack Lake

Highest point
- Elevation: 12,360 ft (3,767 m)
- Prominence: 560 ft (170 m)
- Parent peak: Triple Divide Peak (12,640 ft)
- Isolation: 0.96 mi (1.54 km)
- Listing: Sierra Peaks Section
- Coordinates: 36°34′57″N 118°32′28″W

Geography
- Location within California Location within the United States
- Location: Sequoia National Park; Tulare County; California, U.S.
- Parent range: Sierra Nevada; Great Western Divide
- Topo map: USGS Triple Divide Peak

Geology
- Rock age: Cretaceous
- Mountain type: Fault block
- Rock type: granitic

Climbing
- First ascent: 1927
- Easiest route: class 3 West slope

Lion Rock is a 12,360-foot-elevation (3,770-meter) mountain summit located along the Great Western Divide of the Sierra Nevada mountain range, in Tulare County of northern California. It is situated in Sequoia National Park, one mile northeast of Mount Stewart, and one mile southwest of Triple Divide Peak. Topographic relief is significant as the west aspect rises 3,145 feet (959 meters) above Tamarack Lake in 1.5 mile, and the north aspect rises 1,355 feet (413 meters) above Lion Lake in 0.38 mile. Lion Rock ranks as the 311th highest summit in California.

== History ==
This mountain's name was officially adopted in 1928 by the United States Board on Geographic Names to commemorate the killing of a mountain lion near this location by Mansell Brooks, a sheep rancher, in 1883. The first ascent of the summit was made in 1927 by Dave Winkley, William Curlett, and Earl S. Wallace.

== Climate ==
According to the Köppen climate classification system, Lion Rock is located in an alpine climate zone. Most weather fronts originate in the Pacific Ocean, and travel east toward the Sierra Nevada mountains. As fronts approach, they are forced upward by the peaks, causing them to drop their moisture in the form of rain or snowfall onto the range (orographic lift). Precipitation runoff from the mountain drains west into Lone Pine Creek which is a tributary of Middle Fork Kaweah River, and southeast to headwaters of Big Arroyo, which is a tributary of the Kern River.

== See also ==
- List of mountain peaks of California

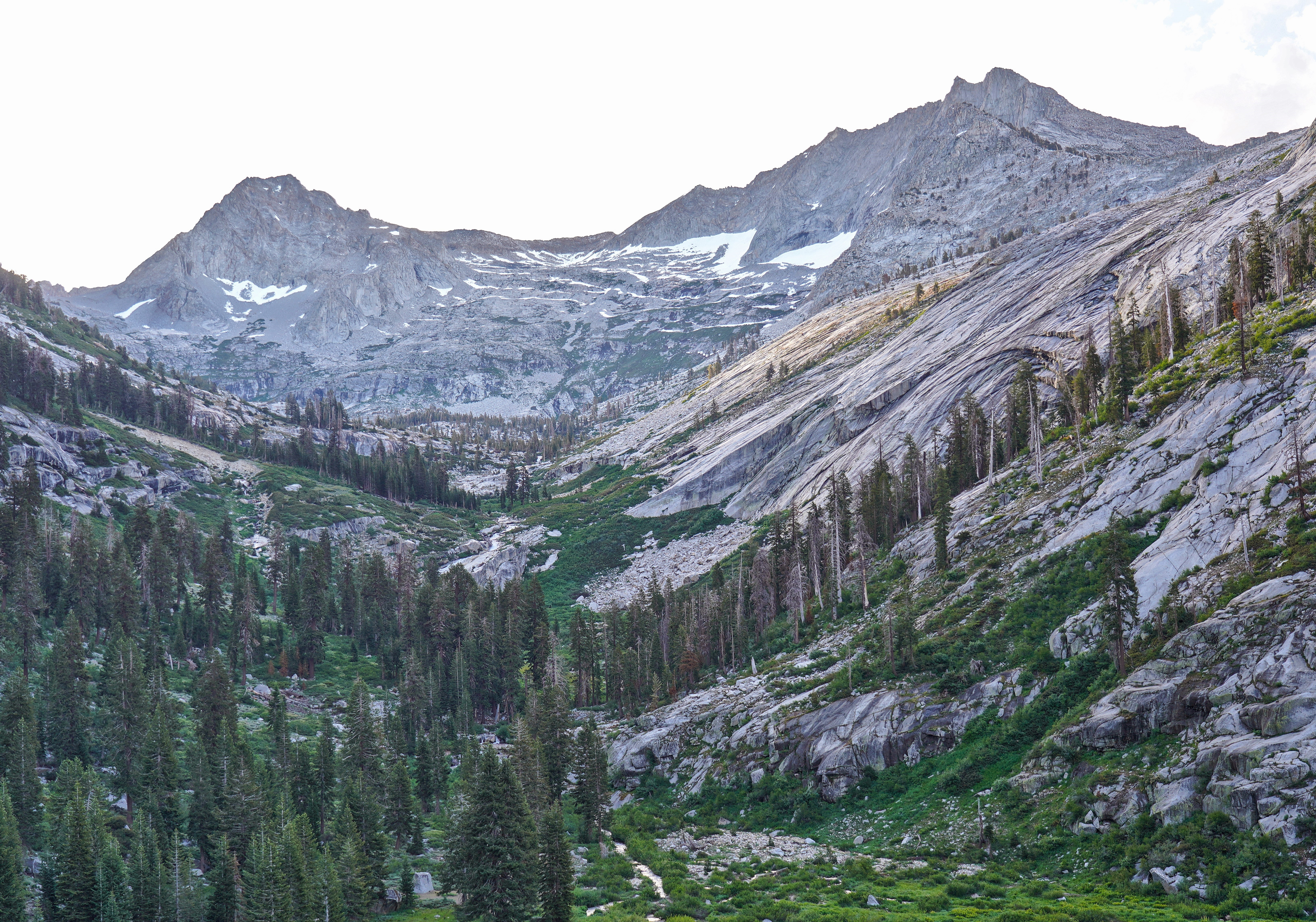
Lion Rock (left) and Mount Stewart (right)
