= Kaweah Queen =

Mountain in Sequoia National Park, Sierra Nevada, California

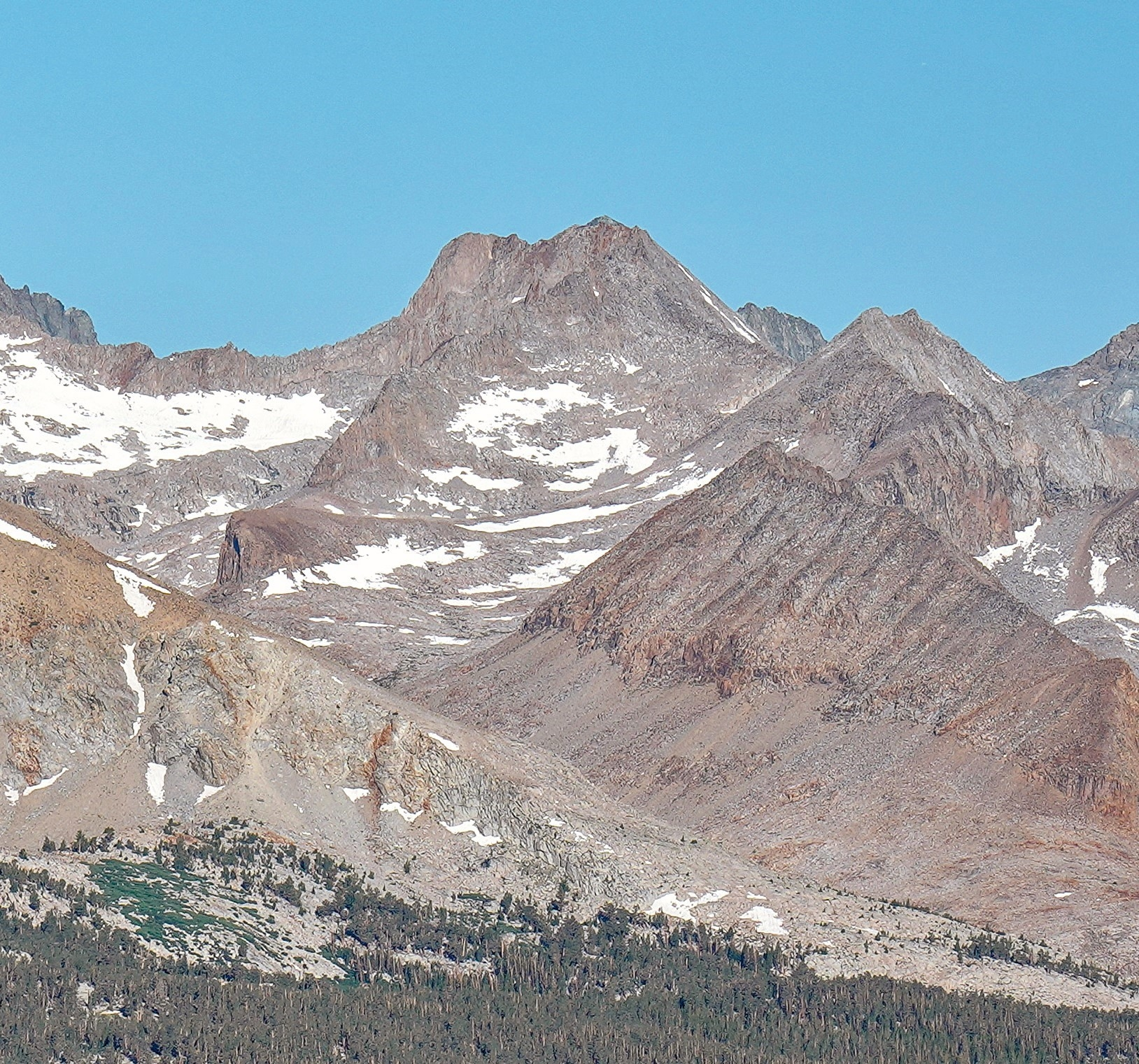
- East aspect

Highest point
- Elevation: 13,388 ft (4,081 m) NAVD 88
- Prominence: 502 ft (153 m)
- Parent peak: Red Kaweah
- Coordinates: 36°33′17″N 118°30′30″W

Geography
- Location: Tulare County, California, U.S.
- Parent range: Great Western Divide, Sierra Nevada
- Topo map: USGS Triple Divide Peak

Climbing
- First ascent: 1924 by Gerald Gaines, C. A. Gaines and H. H. Bliss
- Easiest route: Scramble class 2

Kaweah Queen is a mountain along Kaweah peaks ridge which forms part of the Great Western Divide in the Sierra Nevada. The peak is in California's Sequoia National Park.

== Climate ==
According to the Köppen climate classification system, Kaweah Queen is located in an alpine climate zone. Weather fronts originating in the Pacific Ocean travel east toward the Sierra Nevada mountains. As fronts approach, they are forced upward by the peaks (orographic lift), causing them to drop their moisture in the form of rain or snowfall onto the range.

== Gallery ==
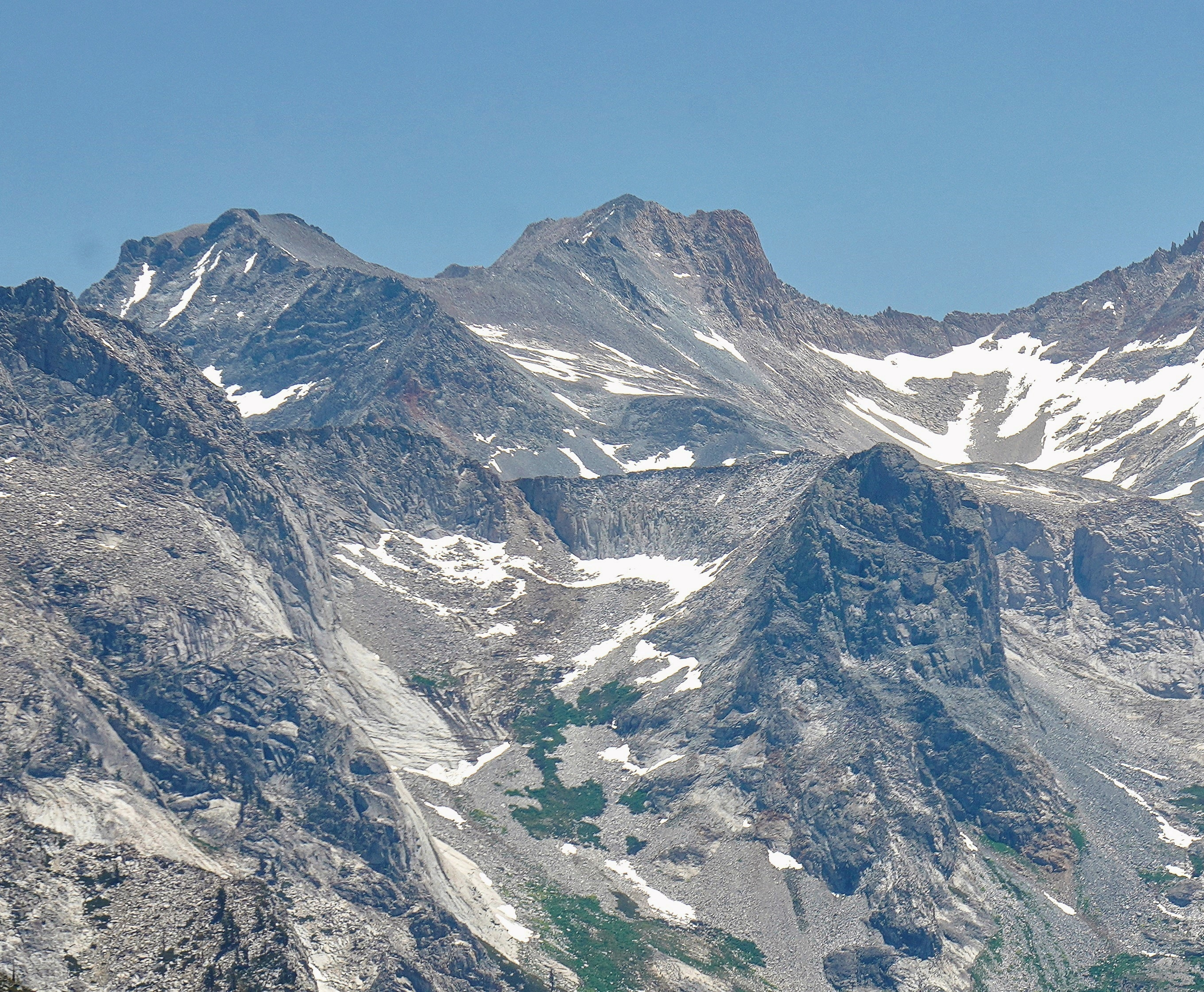
West aspect of Kaweah Queen centered on skyline, with Lawson Peak to left
