= Lawson Peak (California) =

Mountain in the state of California

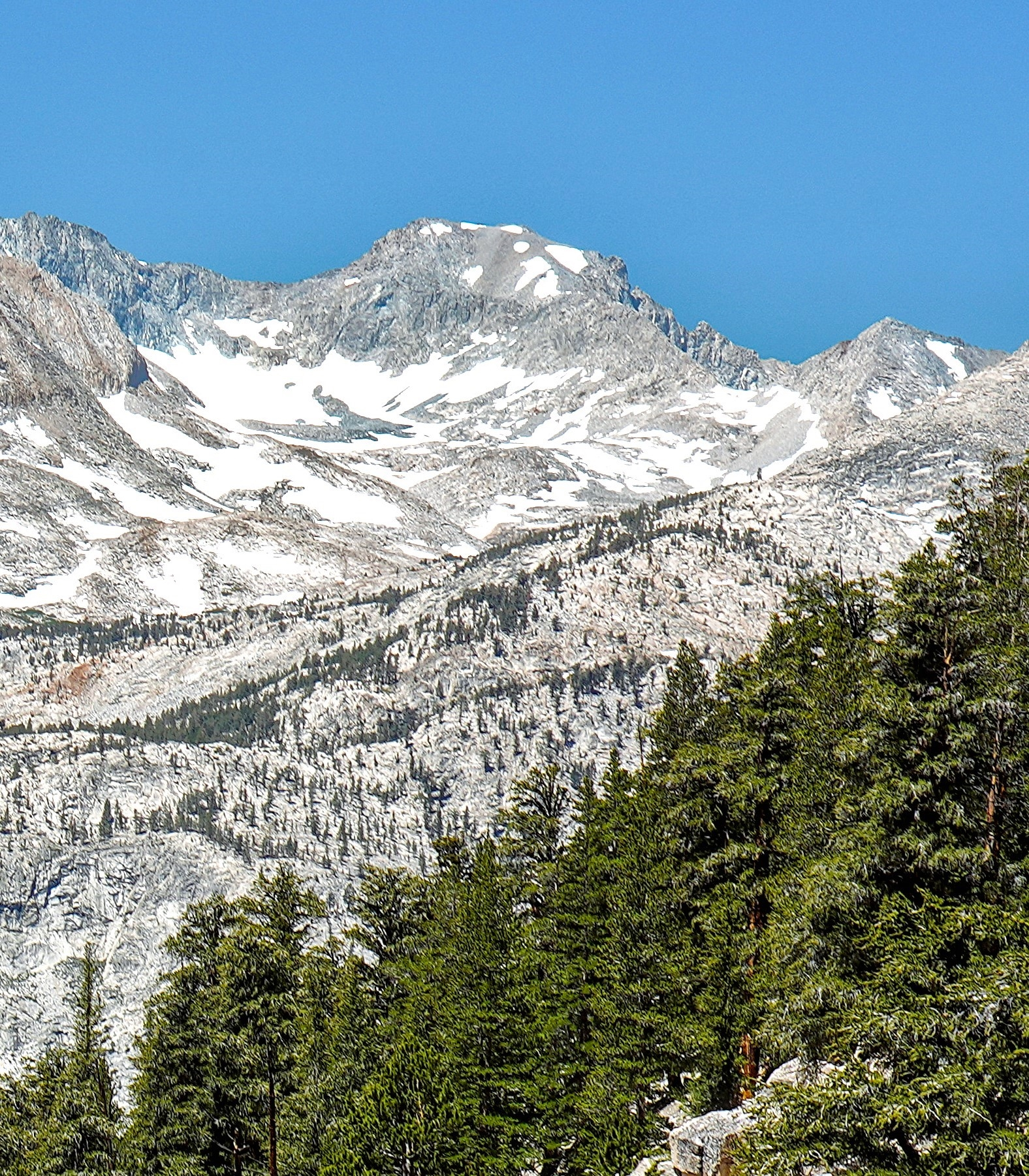
- East aspect

Highest point
- Elevation: 13,165 ft (4,013 m)
- Prominence: 273 ft (83 m)
- Parent peak: Kaweah Queen
- Isolation: 0.48 mi (0.77 km)
- Coordinates: 36°33′36″N 118°30′52″W

Naming
- Etymology: Andrew Lawson

Geography
- Location within California Location within the United States
- Country: United States
- State: California
- County: Tulare
- Protected area: Sequoia National Park
- Parent range: Sierra Nevada
- Topo map: USGS Triple Divide Peak

Geology
- Rock age: Cretaceous
- Mountain type: Fault block
- Rock type: Granodiorite

Climbing
- First ascent: 1924
- Easiest route: Southwest slope class 2

Lawson Peak is a 13,165-foot-elevation (4,013-meter) mountain summit located west of the crest of the Sierra Nevada mountain range in Tulare County, California, United States. It is situated on Kaweah Peaks Ridge of the Great Western Divide in Sequoia National Park. Topographic relief is significant as the summit rises 5,150 feet (1,570 meters) above Kern Canyon in approximately six miles. Precipitation runoff from this mountain drains into tributaries of the Kern River. This landform's toponym was officially adopted in 1976 by the U.S. Board on Geographic Names to commemorate Andrew Lawson (1861–1952), professor of geology at the University of California, Berkeley. The first ascent of the summit was made on July 11, 1924, by Gerald A. Gaines, C. A. Gaines, and H. H. Bliss.

== Climate ==
According to the Köppen climate classification system, Lawson Peak is located in an alpine climate zone. Weather fronts originating in the Pacific Ocean travel east toward the Sierra Nevada mountains. As fronts approach, they are forced upward by the peaks (orographic lift), causing them to drop their moisture in the form of rain or snowfall onto the range.

== See also ==
- List of mountain peaks of California
- Thirteener

== Gallery ==
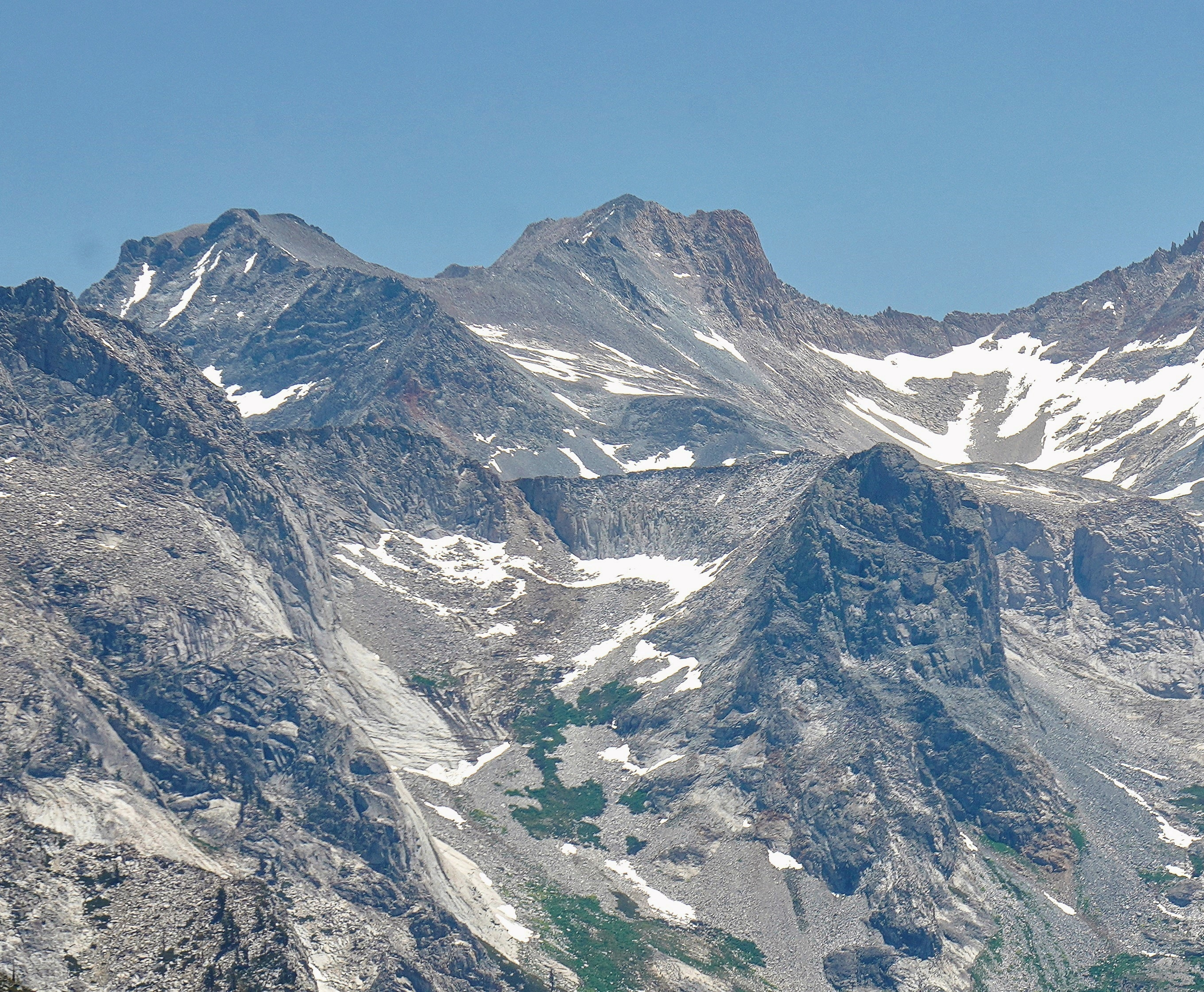
West aspect of Kaweah Queen centered on skyline, with Lawson Peak in upper left
