= Triple Divide Peak (Tulare County, California) =

Mountain in the American state of California

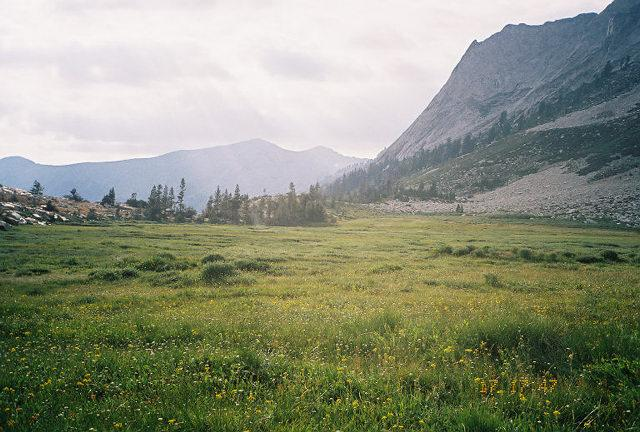
- Tamarack Meadow at 9,500 feet (2,900 m), below Triple Divide Peak, in the backcountry of Sequoia National Park

Highest point
- Elevation: 12,640 ft (3,853 m) NAVD 88
- Prominence: 674 ft (205 m)
- Parent peak: Milestone Mountain
- Listing: SPS Mountaineers peak; Western States Climbers Star peak
- Coordinates: 36°35′34″N 118°31′50″W

Geography
- Location within California Location within the United States
- Location: Sequoia National Park; Kings Canyon National Park; Tulare County, California, U.S.
- Parent range: Great Western Divide, Sierra Nevada
- Topo map: USGS Triple Divide Peak

Climbing
- First ascent: 1920 James Hutchinson, Charles Noble
- Easiest route: East Ridge or Southwest Face, scrambles class 2

Triple Divide Peak is a mountain along the Great Western Divide in the Sierra Nevada range on the boundary between Kings Canyon and Sequoia national parks, in Tulare County, California. It rises to 12,640 feet (3,853 m).

Near Kaweah Gap, the peak divides three important watersheds: the Kern River, the Kaweah River, and the Kings River. This three-way divide leads to the peak's name. At one time, it was also called The Keystone.

The Kaweah Peaks Ridge spurs off to the south, while the Kings-Kaweah Divide branches off to the west.

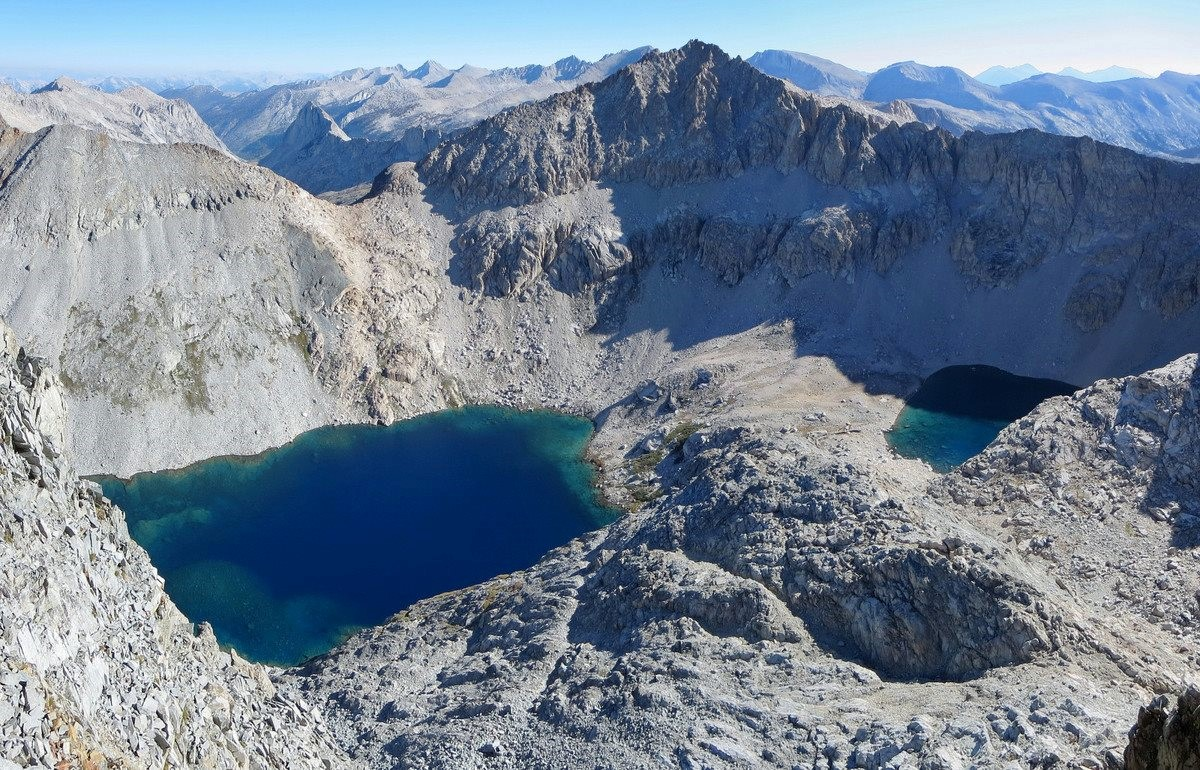
View of Triple Divide Peak and Lion Lake from Lion Rock
