= Red Kaweah =

Mountain in Sequoia National Park, Sierra Nevada, California

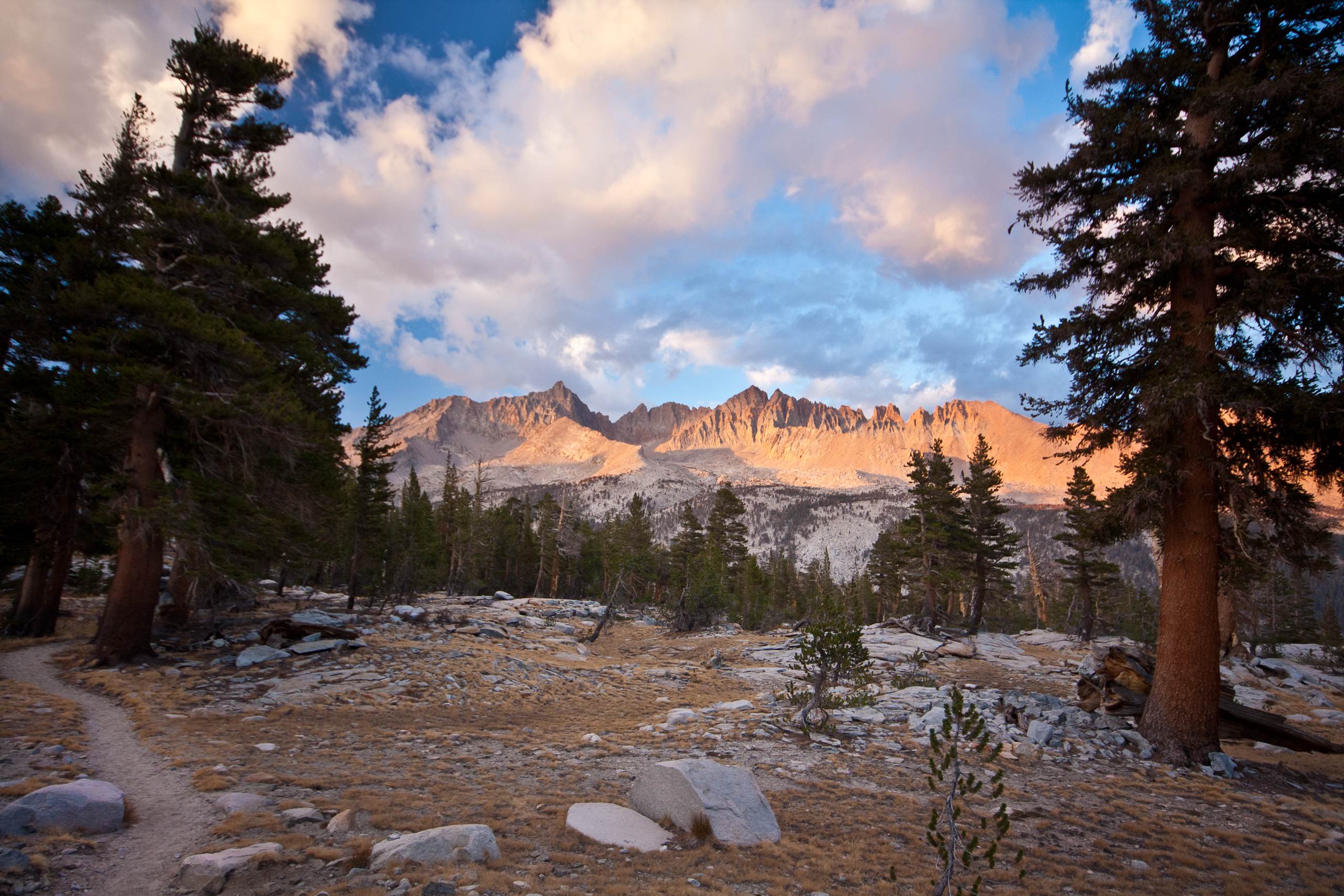
- Red Kaweah is the central peak

Highest point
- Elevation: 13,726+ ft (4184+ m) NAVD 88
- Prominence: 722 ft (220 m)
- Parent peak: Mount Kaweah
- Listing: Sierra Peaks Section; Western States Climbers Emblem peak
- Coordinates: 36°32′23″N 118°30′20″W

Geography
- Location: Tulare County, California, U.S.
- Parent range: Great Western Divide, Sierra Nevada
- Topo map: USGS Triple Divide Peak

Climbing
- First ascent: 1912 by Charles Michael
- Easiest route: Technical Climb, class 4

Red Kaweah is a mountain in California's Sequoia National Park on the Kaweah Peaks Ridge. It is 1.8 miles (2.9 km) north of Mount Kaweah and 0.7 miles (1.1 km) south of Black Kaweah.

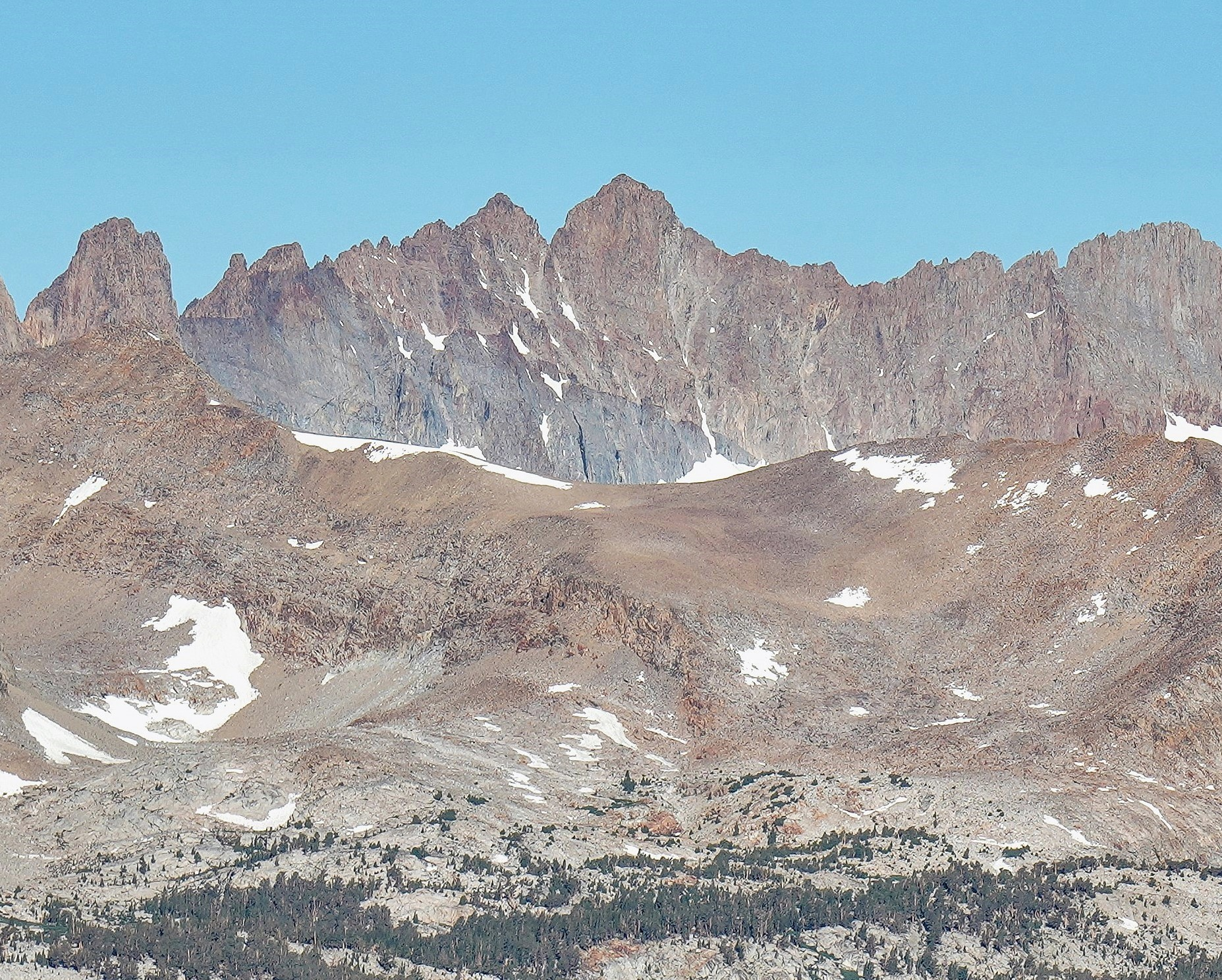
East aspect of Red Kaweah centered
