= Cahuilla County, California =

Proposed county in California, US

Cahuilla County was a proposed county initiated by the residents of eastern Riverside County, California, in the 1980s. It was named after the Cahuilla people, being the homeland of the Native American Tribe for over 2,000 years.

The proposed county would have included the Coachella Valley including the cities of:

- Palm Springs
- Desert Hot Springs
- Cathedral City
- Rancho Mirage
- Palm Desert
- Indian Wells
- La Quinta
- Indio
- Coachella
- Blythe

The ballot measure was ultimately defeated.

== Boundaries ==
The eastern border of the county would have included the current Riverside County's existing eastern county-line north and south of Blythe along the Colorado River and Arizona border. The western border of the county (either the city limits of Banning/Beaumont or near Cabazon) would have included the mountain community of Idyllwild in the San Jacinto Mountains, east of the Hemet area which would have remained in Riverside County.

Proponents argued at the time that the eastern Colorado Desert and Peninsular Ranges mountain areas were distinct from the western urban basin area, commonly known as the Inland Empire, and they were too far removed from the county seat at Riverside, about 70 miles from the possible Cahuilla county seat of Indio.

== See also ==
- Colorado Desert
