= Mount Kaweah =

Highest mountain on the Kaweah Ridge

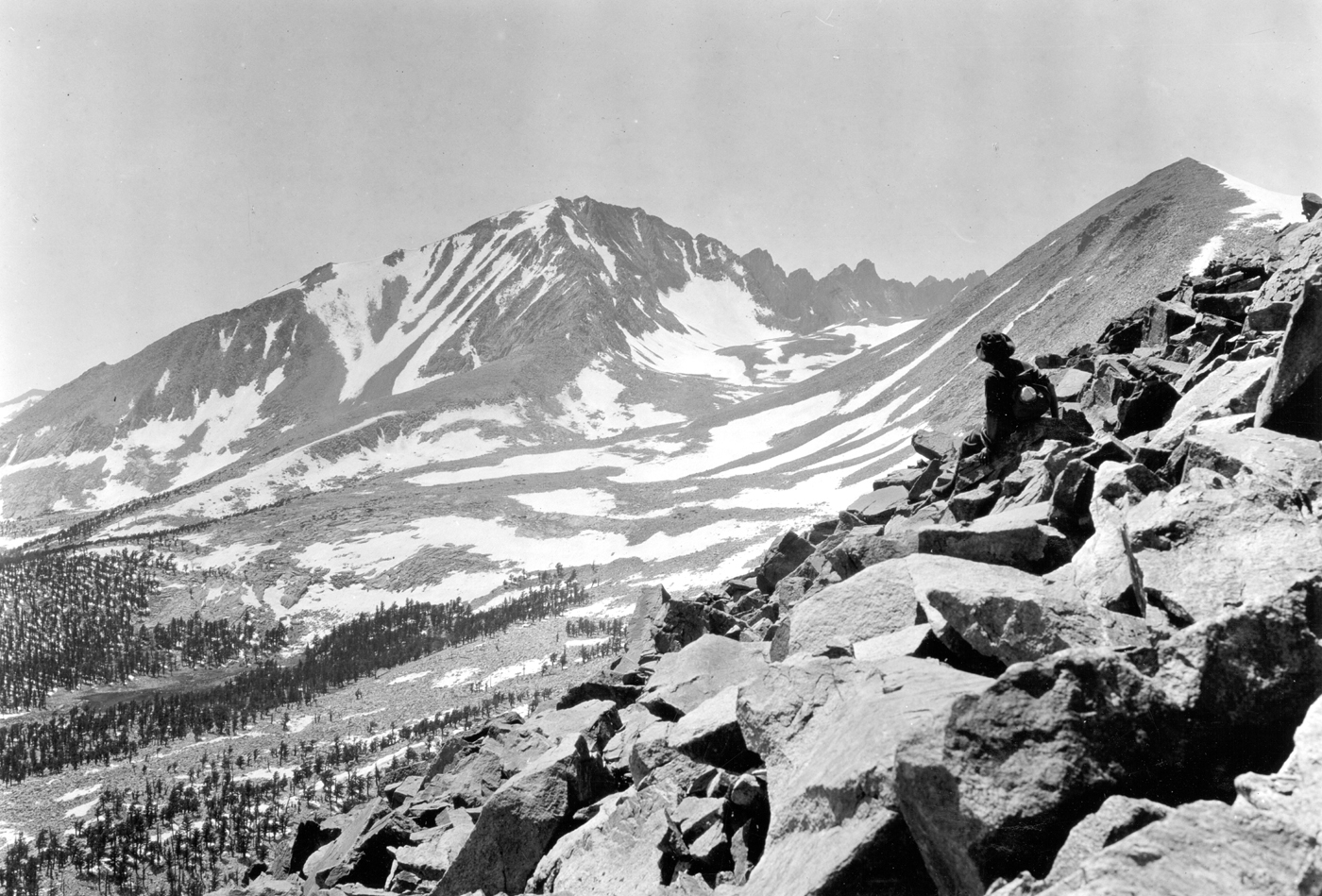
- Mount Kaweah from Red Spur, circa 1932

Highest point
- Elevation: 13,807 ft (4,208 m) NAVD 88
- Prominence: 2,027 ft (618 m)
- Listing: North America highest peaks 76th; US highest major peaks 58th; California highest major peaks 9th; SPS Emblem peak; Western States Climbers Star peak
- Coordinates: 36°31′34″N 118°28′42″W

Geography
- Location within California
- Location: Tulare County, California, U.S.
- Parent range: Great Western Divide, Sierra Nevada
- Topo map: USGS Triple Divide Peak

Climbing
- First ascent: September 1881 by Frederick H. Wales, William B. Wallace and James W. A. Wright
- Easiest route: Hike, class 1

Mount Kaweah (/kəˈwiː.ə/) is a mountain in California's Sequoia National Park and forms part of the Kaweah Peaks Ridge, a spur of the Great Western Divide which extends south from Triple Divide Peak. It has a summit elevation of 13,807 ft (4,208 m), the highest along the Kaweah Peaks Ridge.

== Name ==
The peak was named for the Kaweah River which has its headwaters to the west of the Kaweah Peaks Ridge. The Kaweahs, however, drain into the Kern River. The Kaweah River was named for the Kawai (or Gā'wia) tribe, members of the Yokuts people. The Yokuts were once known as Mariposa.

== Foxtail Pine ==
A rare pine, the Foxtail Pine, lives on the southern slopes of Mount Kaweah.

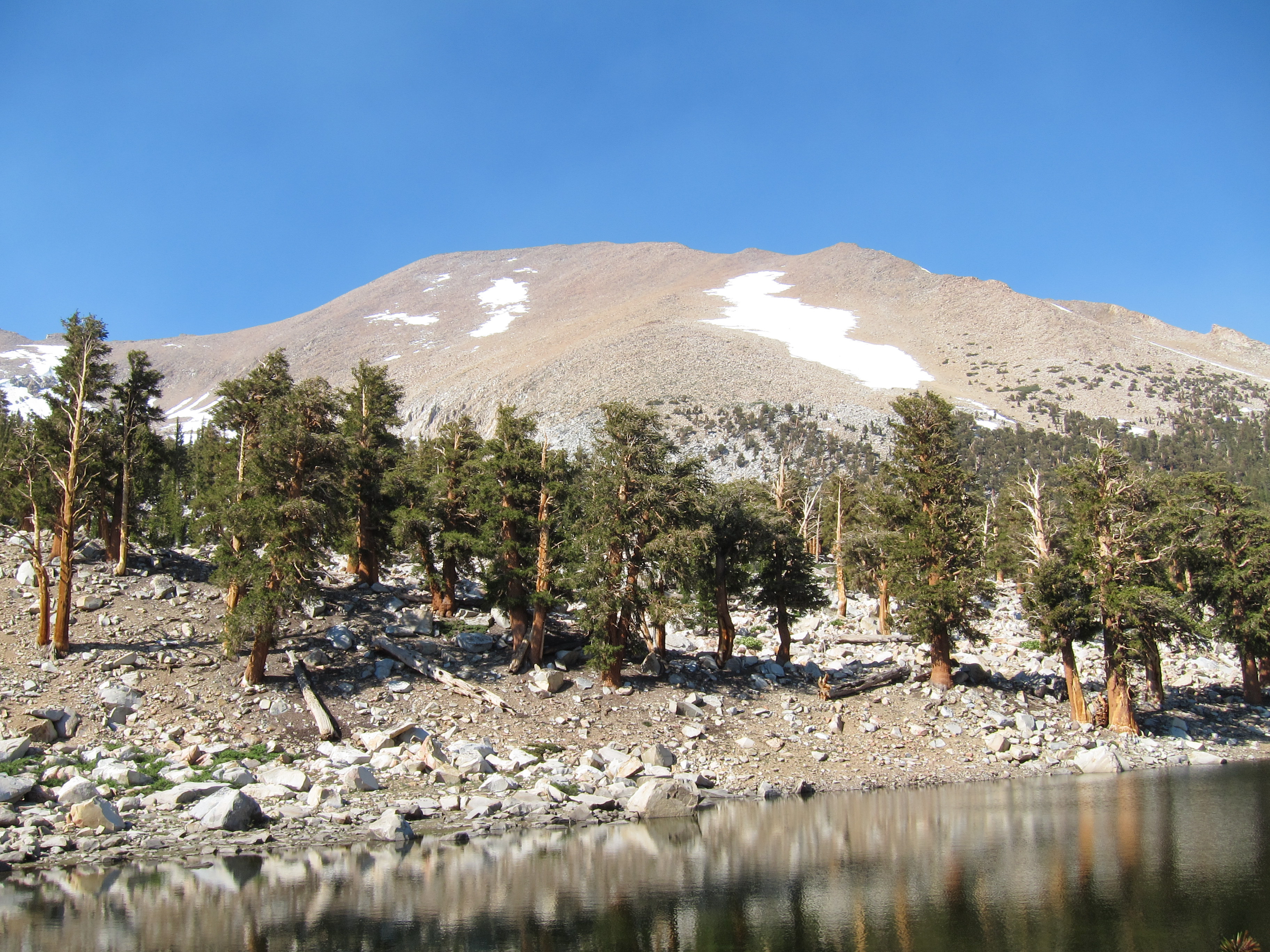
Foxtail Pine below Mount Kaweah (2011)

== Highest mountain in the southwest Sierra ==
Mount Kaweah is the highest mountain in the southwest Sierra.

== See also ==
- List of mountain peaks of California
