= Black Kaweah =

Mountain of California's Sierra Nevada, in Sequoia National Park

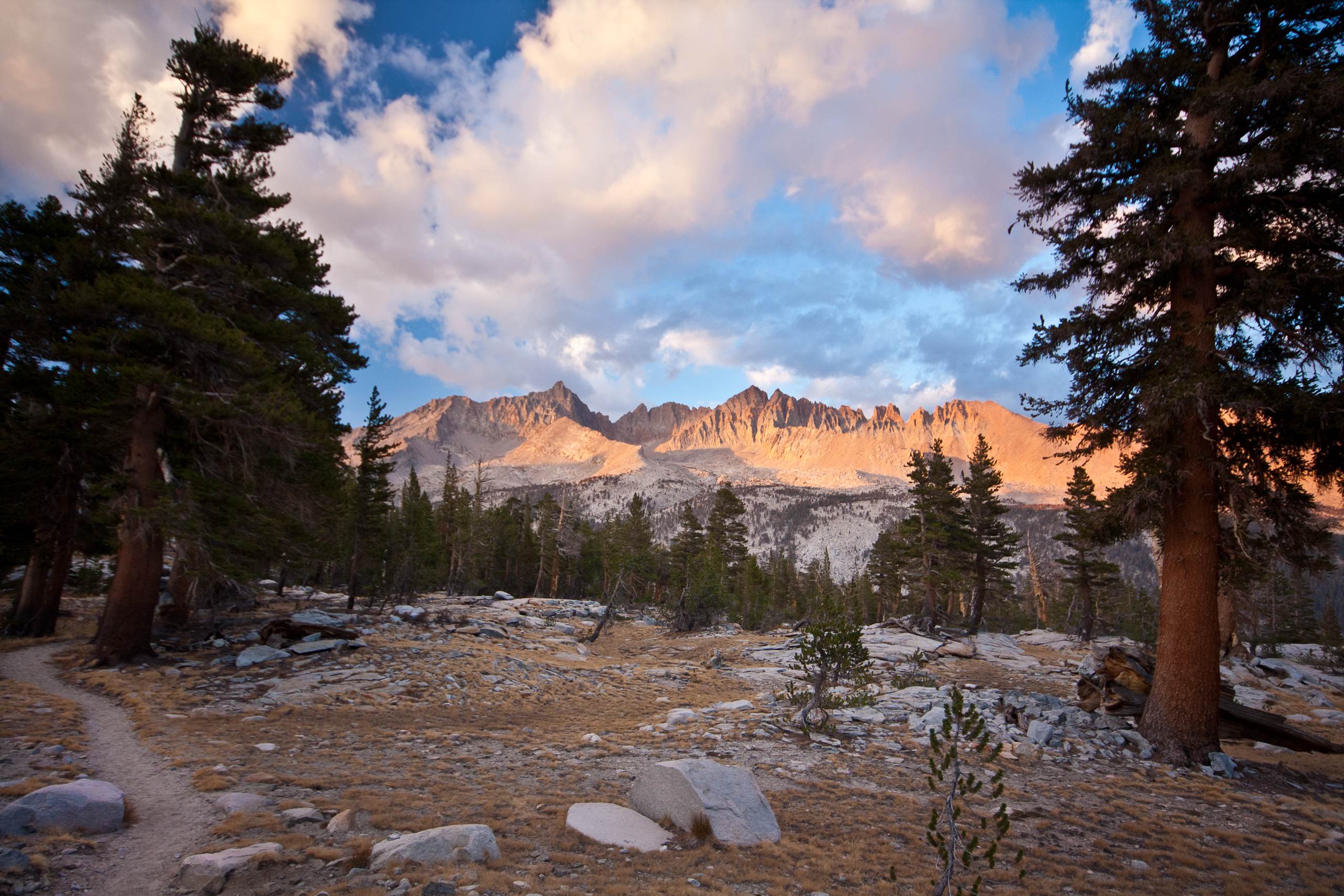
- Black Kaweah is the leftmost peak

Highest point
- Elevation: 13,686+ ft (4,172+ m) NAVD 88
- Prominence: 520 ft (158 m)
- Parent peak: Red Kaweah
- Listing: SPS Mountaineers peak
- Coordinates: 36°32′43″N 118°30′57″W

Geography
- Location: Sequoia National Park, Tulare County, California, U.S.
- Parent range: Sierra Nevada, Great Western Divide
- Topo map: USGS Triple Divide Peak

Climbing
- First ascent: August 11, 1920 via West Ridge by Duncan McDuffie, Onis Brown, James Hutchinson
- Easiest route: Exposed scramble, class 3

Black Kaweah is a mountain of the Kaweah Peaks Ridge of the California's Sierra Nevada, in Sequoia National Park. The peak has a local magnetic disturbance that has caused compasses in the vicinity to vary by up to eight degrees. Fulgurites can be found on the peak.
