= Great Western Divide =

Divide that separates three watersheds in California, United States

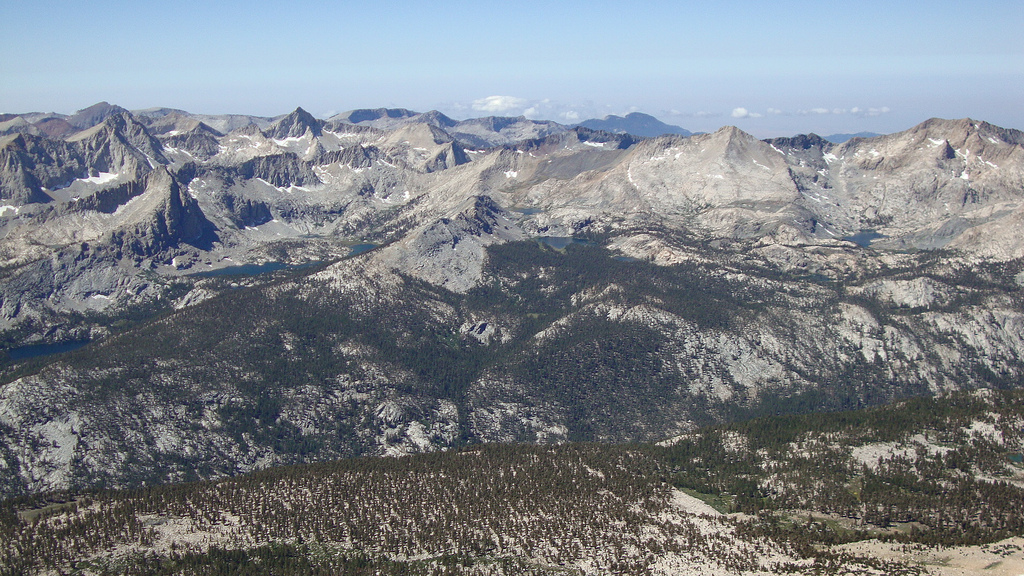
- Great Western Divide from Mount Kaweah

Highest point
- Peak: Mount Kaweah, Kaweah Peaks Ridge
- Elevation: 13,802 ft (4,207 m) NAVD 88
- Coordinates: 36°31′34″N 118°28′43″W

Dimensions
- Length: 50 km (31 mi)

Geography
- Location within California
- Country: United States
- State: California
- County: Tulare
- Range coordinates: 36°28′N 118°30′W
- Parent range: Sierra Nevada
- Topo map: USGS Mount Kaweah

The Great Western Divide is a Sierra Nevada mountain range located largely in Sequoia National Park. Some of the summits of the Great Western Divide reach well over 13,000 feet (3,962 m). The High Sierra Trail crosses the range at Kaweah Gap from Sequoia National Park.

The divide separates the watersheds of the Kaweah, Kern and Kings rivers. The divide includes the Kaweah Peaks Ridge.

== List of peaks ==
- Black Kaweah
- Mount Brewer
- North Guard
- South Guard
- Mount Farquhar
- Mount Kaweah
- Red Kaweah
- Kaweah Queen
- Lawson Peak
- Milestone Mountain
- Midway Mountain
- Triple Divide Peak
- Lippincott Mountain
- Lion Rock
- Mount Eisen
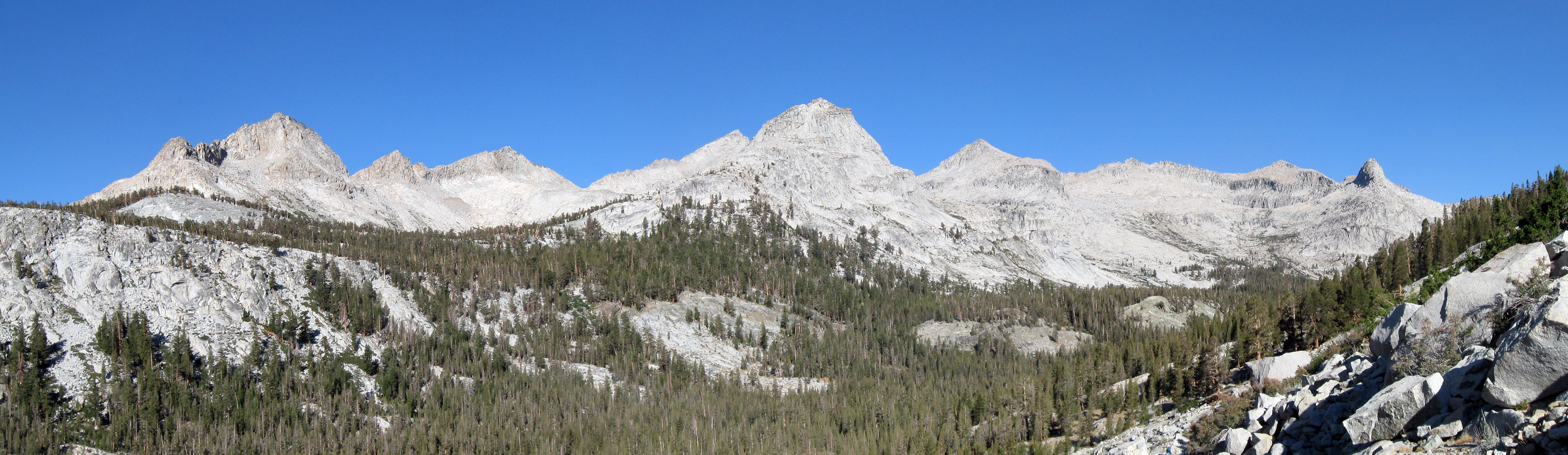
The Great Western Divide from the High Sierra Trail
