= Kaweah Peaks Ridge =

Ridge in California, United States

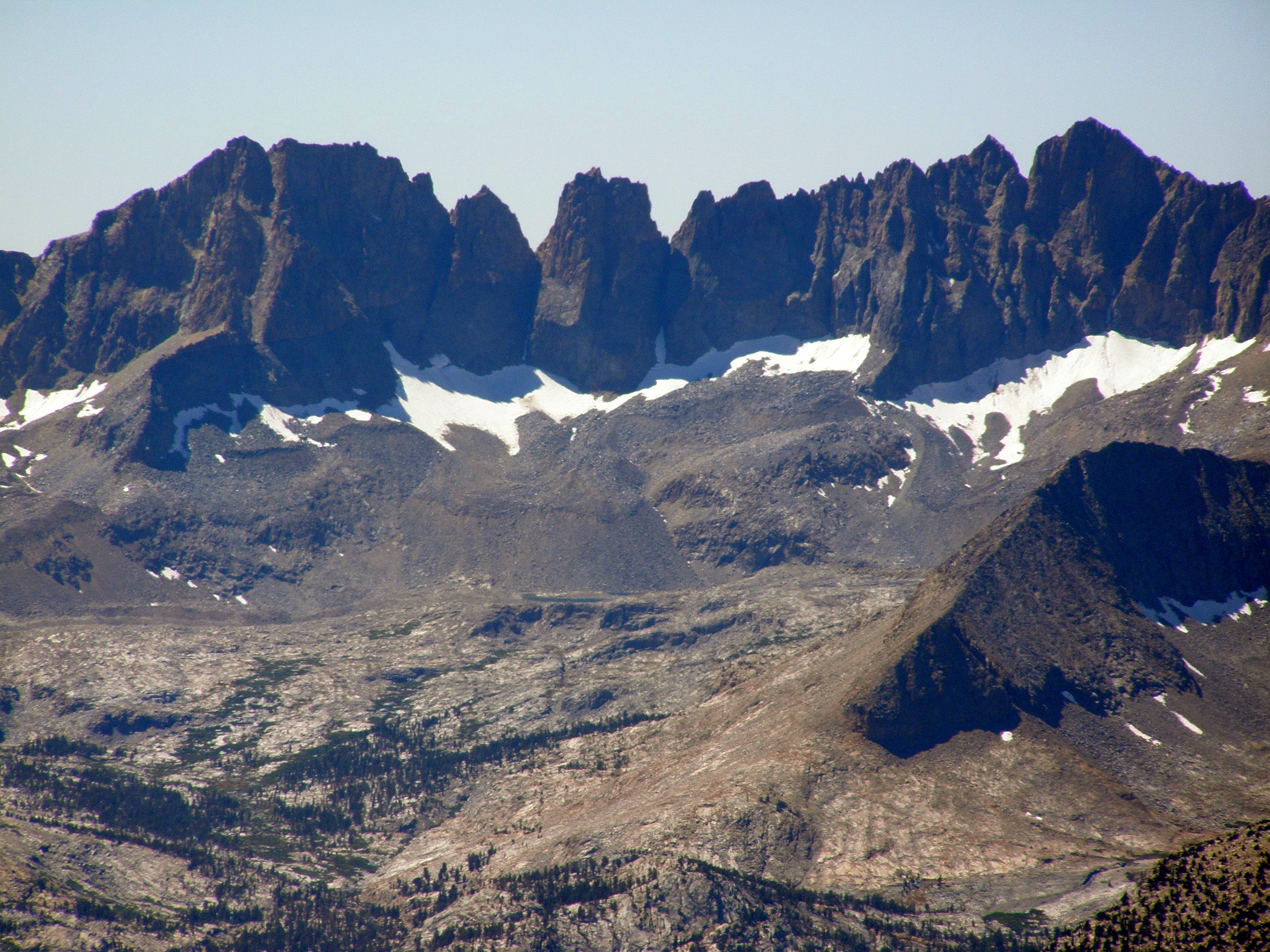
- Kaweah Peaks Ridge from the northeast. Second Kaweah on left, Red Kaweah on right.

Highest point
- Peak: Mount Kaweah
- Elevation: 13,807 ft (4,208 m) NAVD 88
- Coordinates: 36°33′N 118°30.5′W

Geography
- Location within California
- Location: California, United States
- Parent range: Great Western Divide, Sierra Nevada

Geology
- Rock type: Metamorphic

Kaweah Peaks Ridge is a spur of the Great Western Divide, a sub-range of California's Sierra Nevada. The ridge is located in Sequoia National Park and is composed of mostly rugged and loose metamorphic rock.

== Named mountains ==
There are several officially named peaks along the ridge:

- Black Kaweah (13,686+ ft / 4,172+ m)
- Kaweah Queen (13,388 ft / 4,081 m)
- Lawson Peak (13,165 ft / 4,013 m)
- Mount Kaweah (13,807 ft / 4,208 m)
- Red Kaweah, (13,726+ ft / 4184+ m)

== Location ==
The peaks, 20 miles (32 km) by trail from any road, are south of the Kings-Kaweah Divide, east of the Great Western Divide and, despite their name, are in the Kern watershed, not the Kaweah watershed. There are many high alpine lakes surrounding the peaks in Nine Lake Basin to the west and Kaweah Basin to the east. Visitors are rare due to the isolated location, but the Kaweah Peaks offer tranquil camping, fishing and high alpine mountaineering. For the most part, the rock is loose and metamorphic.
