= List of highest counties in the United States =

List of the highest United States counties by mean elevation

An enlargeable map of the counties and county equivalents located in the 50 U.S. states and Washington, D.C. as of 2020. Connecticut's nine councils of government and the 100 county equivalents in the U.S. territories are not on this map.

The following table ranks the 50 highest United States counties or county-equivalents (Note: Forty-eight U.S. states have counties, Louisiana has parishes, and Alaska has boroughs and census areas in the Unorganized Borough. The entire District of Columbia is considered a county-equivalent, as are the 38 independent cities of Virginia, and the independent cities of Baltimore, Maryland, St. Louis, Missouri, and Carson City, Nevada.) by mean elevation. (Note: The "mean of extremes" elevation is the arithmetic mean of the highest and lowest elevations.) This list uses the "mean of extremes" elevation which is the arithmetic mean of the highest and lowest elevations.

Lake County, Colorado has the highest U.S. county mean elevation of 11,702 feet (3,567 m). Lake County is the home of Mount Elbert and Mount Massive, the two highest summits of the Rocky Mountains of the United States and Canada. Lake County is also the home of the highest U.S. county low point, the Arkansas River at the Chaffee County line with an elevation of 8,965 feet (2,733 m).

With the highest mountain of all North America, the Denali Borough of Alaska has both the highest U.S. county high point, the summit of Denali at 20,310 feet (6,190.5 m) elevation, and the greatest U.S. county elevation range of 19,925 feet (6,073 m).

Of these 50 highest U.S. counties, 34 counties are located in Colorado, four counties in Wyoming, four counties in New Mexico, three counties in Utah, two boroughs in Alaska, and one county each in California, Idaho, and Nevada.

== Highest U.S. counties ==
The 50 highest United States counties ranked by mean elevation
Rank (Note: Rank among United States counties and county-equivalents by mean elevation.)	County.	State	Mean elevation	High point (Note: The high point of an area is the point of maximum topographic elevation. The high point may, or may not, be a summit.)	Highest elevation (Note: Topographic elevations are adjusted to the North American Vertical Datum of 1988.)	Low point (Note: The low point of an area is the point of minimum topographic elevation. The low point is often a gulch, stream, river, reservoir, lake, ocean, or endorheic basin.)	Lowest elevation	Elevation range (Note: The elevation range is the arithmetic difference between the highest and lowest elevations.)	High point coordinates (Note: Geodetic coordinates are adjusted to the World Geodetic System 1984.)
1	Lake County (Note: Lake County, Colorado is the highest county in the United States by mean elevation at 11,702 feet (3,567 m).)	Colorado	11,702 feet 3,567 m	Mount Elbert (Note: Mount Elbert is the highest summit of the Rocky Mountains of the United States and Canada. Mount Elbert is the highest summit of the State of Colorado and the highest point in the Mississippi River Basin.)	14,439.6 feet 4,401.2 m	Arkansas River (Note: The point where the Arkansas River flows out of Lake County and into Chaffee County, Colorado, is the highest county low point in the United States at 8,965 feet (2,733 m) elevation.)	8,965 feet 2,733 m	5,475 feet 1,669 m	39.20°N 106.34°W
2	Hinsdale County	Colorado	11,300 feet 3,444 m	Uncompahgre Peak (Note: Uncompahgre Peak is the highest summit of the San Juan Mountains. Uncompahgre Peak is the highest point in the Colorado River Basin of the United States and México.)	14,315 feet 4,363 m	Lake Fork Gunnison River	8,285 feet 2,525 m	6,030 feet 1,838 m	37.82°N 107.30°W
3	Mineral County	Colorado	11,116 feet 3,388 m	Phoenix Peak	13,902 feet 4,237 m	Rio Grande	8,330 feet 2,539 m	5,572 feet 1,698 m	37.67°N 106.92°W
4	San Juan County	Colorado	11,085 feet 3,379 m	Vermilion Peak	13,900 feet 4,237 m	Animas River	8,270 feet 2,521 m	5,630 feet 1,716 m	37.76°N 107.68°W
5	Summit County	Colorado	10,936 feet 3,333 m	Grays Peak (Note: Grays Peak is the highest summit of the Front Range and the highest point on the Continental Divide in North America.)	14,276 feet 4,351 m	Blue River	7,595 feet 2,315 m	6,681 feet 2,036 m	39.63°N 106.12°W
6	Alamosa County	Colorado	10,928 feet 3,331 m	Blanca Peak (Note: Blanca Peak is the highest summit of the Sangre de Cristo Range and the easternmost point of its elevation in the United States. Blanca Peak is the highest point in the Rio Grande Basin of the United States and México.)	14,351 feet 4,374 m	Rio Grande	7,506 feet 2,288 m	6,845 feet 2,086 m	37.57°N 105.79°W
7	Saguache County	Colorado	10,915 feet 3,327 m	Crestone Peak	14,300 feet 4,359 m	San Luis Creek	7,530 feet 2,295 m	6,770 feet 2,063 m	38.08°N 106.28°W
8	Costilla County	Colorado	10,866 feet 3,312 m	Blanca Peak	14,351 feet 4,374 m	Rio Grande	7,380 feet 2,249 m	6,971 feet 2,125 m	37.28°N 105.43°W
9	Park County	Colorado	10,706 feet 3,263 m	Mount Lincoln (Note: Mount Lincoln is the highest summit of the Mosquito Range.)	14,293 feet 4,356.5 m	South Platte River	7,118 feet 2,170 m	7,175 feet 2,187 m	39.12°N 105.72°W
10	Chaffee County	Colorado	10,658 feet 3,249 m	Mount Harvard (Note: Mount Harvard is the highest summit of the Collegiate Peaks and the easternmost point of its elevation in the United States.)	14,421.3 feet 4,395.6 m	Arkansas River	6,895 feet 2,102 m	7,526 feet 2,294 m	38.75°N 106.19°W
11	Clear Creek County	Colorado	10,608 feet 3,233 m	Grays Peak (Note: Grays Peak is the highest summit of the Front Range and the highest point on the Continental Divide in North America.)	14,276 feet 4,351 m	Clear Creek	6,940 feet 2,115 m	7,336 feet 2,236 m	39.69°N 105.64°W
12	Rio Grande County	Colorado	10,402 feet 3,171 m	Bennett Peak	13,209 feet 4,026 m	Rock Creek	7,595 feet 2,315 m	5,614 feet 1,711 m	37.58°N 106.38°W
13	Jackson County	Colorado	10,353 feet 3,156 m	Clark Peak (Note: Clark Peak is the highest summit of the Medicine Bow Mountains.)	12,956 feet 3,949 m	North Platte River	7,750 feet 2,362 m	5,206 feet 1,587 m	40.67°N 106.34°W
14	Denali Borough (Note: The Denali Borough, Alaska has the greatest elevation range of any U.S. county or county-equivalent at 19,925 feet (6,073 m).)	Alaska	10,348 feet 3,154 m	Denali (Note: The summit of Denali is the highest point in the United States and all of North America with an elevation of 20,310 feet (6,190.5 m). Denali is both the third most topographically prominent summit and the third most topographically isolated summit on Earth after Mount Everest and Aconcagua. Denali is the highest point in the Arctic Ocean Basin.)	20,310 feet 6,190.5 m	Nenana River	385 feet 117 m	19,925 feet 6,073 m	63.79°N 150.19°W
15	Conejos County	Colorado	10,279 feet 3,133 m	Conejos Peak	13,178 feet 4,017 m	Rio Grande	7,380 feet 2,249 m	5,798 feet 1,767 m	37.20°N 106.19°W
16	Pitkin County	Colorado	10,269 feet 3,130 m	Castle Peak (Note: Castle Peak is the highest summit of the Elk Mountains.)	14,278.9 feet 4,352.2 m	Crystal River	6,260 feet 1,908 m	8,019 feet 2,444 m	39.22°N 106.92°W
17	Ouray County	Colorado	10,249 feet 3,124 m	Mount Sneffels (Note: Mount Sneffels is the highest summit of the Sneffels Range.)	14,158.1 feet 4,315.4 m	Uncompahgre River	6,340 feet 1,932 m	7,818 feet 2,383 m	38.16°N 107.77°W
18	Grand County	Colorado	10,197 feet 3,108 m	Pettingell Peak	13,559 feet 4,133 m	Colorado River	6,835 feet 2,083 m	6,724 feet 2,049 m	40.10°N 106.12°W
19	Sublette County	Wyoming	10,190 feet 3,106 m	Gannett Peak (Note: Gannett Peak is the highest summit of the Wind River Range, the Central Rocky Mountains, and the State of Wyoming. Gannett Peak is the highest point in the Green River Basin.)	13,809.4 feet 4,209.1 m	Green River	6,570 feet 2,003 m	7,239 feet 2,206 m	42.76°N 109.92°W
20	Gilpin County	Colorado	10,120 feet 3,085 m	James Peak	13,300 feet 4,054 m	Clear Creek	6,940 feet 2,115 m	6,360 feet 1,939 m	39.86°N 105.52°W
21	Gunnison County	Colorado	10,094 feet 3,077 m	Castle Peak	14,278.9 feet 4,352.2 m	North Fork Gunnison River	5,910 feet 1,801 m	8,369 feet 2,551 m	38.67°N 107.03°W
22	Custer County	Colorado	10,076 feet 3,071 m	Crestone East Peak (Note: Crestone East Peak is located 432 feet (132 m) east-northeast and 34 feet (10.4 m) below the summit of Crestone Peak.)	14,266 feet 4,348 m	Hardscrabble Creek	5,885 feet 1,794 m	8,381 feet 2,555 m	38.11°N 105.37°W
23	Eagle County	Colorado	10,068 feet 3,069 m	Mount of the Holy Cross (Note: Mount of the Holy Cross is the highest summit of the northern Sawatch Range.)	14,011 feet 4,271 m	Colorado River	6,125 feet 1,867 m	7,886 feet 2,404 m	39.63°N 106.70°W
24	La Plata County	Colorado	10,012 feet 3,052 m	Windom Peak (Note: Windom Peak is the highest summit of the Needle Mountains.)	14,093 feet 4,296 m	Animas River	5,930 feet 1,807 m	8,163 feet 2,488 m	37.29°N 107.84°W
25	Teller County	Colorado	9,892 feet 3,015 m	Devils Playground (Note: The Devils Playground is located 2.15 miles (3.46 km) northwest and 1,040 feet (317 m) below the summit of Pikes Peak. The Devils Playground is named for the way lightning sometimes dances around the prominence during lightning storms.)	13,075 feet 3,985 m	Fourmile Creek	6,710 feet 2,045 m	6,365 feet 1,940 m	38.88°N 105.16°W
26	Teton County	Wyoming	9,790 feet 2,984 m	Grand Teton (Note: Grand Teton is the highest summit of the Teton Range. Grand Teton is the highest point in the Columbia River drainage basin of Canada and the United States.)	13,775.3 feet 4,198.7 m	Snake River	5,804 feet 1,769 m	7,971 feet 2,430 m	43.92°N 110.57°W
27	Huerfano County	Colorado	9,779 feet 2,981 m	Blanca Peak Tripoint (Note: The Blanca Peak Tripoint is located 140 feet (43 m) north-northeast and 25 feet (7.6 m) below the summit of Blanca Peak. The Tripoint is the junction of Alamosa, Costilla, and Huerfano counties, Colorado. This point gave surveyors a better point to set the intersection of the three counties than the summit itself.)	14,326 feet 4,367 m	Cucharas River	5,232 feet 1,595 m	9,094 feet 2,772 m	37.68°N 104.96°W
28	Dolores County	Colorado	9,721 feet 2,963 m	Mount Wilson (Note: Mount Wilson is the highest summit of the San Miguel Mountains.)	14,252 feet 4,344 m	Spook Canyon	5,190 feet 1,582 m	9,062 feet 2,762 m	37.75°N 108.52°W
29	Archuleta County	Colorado	9,669 feet 2,947 m	Summit Peak (Note: Summit Peak is the highest summit of the southern San Juan Mountains.)	13,307.7 feet 4,056.2 m	Navajo Reservoir (Note: The elevation of Navajo Reservoir varies seasonally.)	6,027 feet 1,837 m	7,278 feet 2,218 m	37.19°N 107.05°W
30	San Miguel County	Colorado	9,666 feet 2,946 m	Wilson Peak (Note: Wilson Peak is located 1.51 miles (2.43 km) north-northeast and 229 feet (70 m) lower than the summit of Mount Wilson.)	14,023 feet 4,274 m	Dolores River	5,310 feet 1,618 m	8,713 feet 2,656 m	38.00°N 108.41°W
31	El Paso County	Colorado	9,580 feet 2,920 m	Pikes Peak (Note: Pikes Peak is the highest summit of the southern Front Range and the easternmost point of its elevation in the United States.)	14,115.2 feet 4,302.31 m	Chico Creek	5,045 feet 1,538 m	9,070 feet 2,765 m	38.83°N 104.53°W
32	Boulder County	Colorado	9,578 feet 2,919 m	Longs Peak (Note: Longs Peak is the highest summit of the northern Front Range.)	14,260 feet 4,346 m	Saint Vrain Creek	4,895 feet 1,492 m	9,365 feet 2,854 m	40.09°N 105.36°W
33	Taos County	New Mexico	9,524 feet 2,903 m	Wheeler Peak (Note: Wheeler Peak is the highest summit of the Taos Mountains and the State of New Mexico.)	13,166 feet 4,013 m	Rio Grande	5,882 feet 1,793 m	7,284 feet 2,220 m	36.57°N 105.63°W
34	Mono County	California	9,452 feet 2,881 m	White Mountain Peak (Note: White Mountain Peak is the highest summit of the White Mountains.)	14,252 feet 4,344 m	Owens River	4,652 feet 1,418 m	9,600 feet 2,926 m	38.08°N 119.87°W
35	Park County	Wyoming	9,354 feet 2,851 m	Francs Peak (Note: Francs Peak is the highest summit of the Absaroka Range.)	13,158 feet 4,011 m	Yellowstone River	5,550 feet 1,692 m	7,608 feet 2,319 m	44.49°N 109.56°W
36	Summit County	Utah	9,352 feet 2,850 m	Gilbert Peak (Note: Gilbert Peak is located 3.7 miles (6.0 km) north-northeast and 86 feet (26 m) lower than the summit of Kings Peak.)	13,448 feet 4,099 m	Weber River	5,255 feet 1,602 m	8,193 feet 2,497 m	40.88°N 110.97°W
37	Rio Arriba County	New Mexico	9,321 feet 2,841 m	Truchas Peak (Note: Truchas Peak is the highest summit of the Santa Fe Mountains.)	13,107 feet 3,995 m	Rio Grande	5,535 feet 1,687 m	7,572 feet 2,308 m	36.51°N 106.70°W
38	Routt County	Colorado	9,208 feet 2,807 m	Mount Zirkel (Note: Mount Zirkel is the highest summit of the Park Range.)	12,185 feet 3,714 m	Yampa River	6,230 feet 1,899 m	5,955 feet 1,815 m	40.48°N 106.99°W
39	Duchesne County	Utah	9,192 feet 2,802 m	Kings Peak (Note: Kings Peak is the highest summit of the Uinta Range, the Western Rocky Mountains, and the State of Utah.)	13,534 feet 4,125 m	Ninemile Creek	4,850 feet 1,478 m	8,684 feet 2,647 m	40.28°N 110.44°W
40	Fremont County	Wyoming	9,184 feet 2,799 m	Gannett Peak	13,809.4 feet 4,209.1 m	Wind River	4,558 feet 1,389 m	9,251 feet 2,820 m	43.03°N 108.63°W
41	Larimer County	Colorado	9,176 feet 2,797 m	Hagues Peak (Note: Hagues Peak is the highest summit of the Mummy Range.)	13,566 feet 4,135 m	Cache la Poudre River	4,785 feet 1,458 m	8,781 feet 2,676 m	40.67°N 105.46°W
42	Custer County	Idaho	9,109 feet 2,776 m	Borah Peak (Note: Borah Peak is the highest summit of the Lost River Range and the State of Idaho.)	12,668 feet 3,861 m	Big Lost River	5,550 feet 1,692 m	7,118 feet 2,170 m	44.23°N 114.29°W
43	White Pine County	Nevada	9,073 feet 2,765 m	Wheeler Peak (Note: Wheeler Peak is the highest summit of the Snake Range.)	13,065.3 feet 3,982.3 m	Utah border	5,080 feet 1,548 m	7,985 feet 2,434 m	39.44°N 114.90°W
44	Santa Fe County (Note: The full name of the City of Santa Fe is La Villa Real de la Santa Fe de San Francisco de Asís.)	New Mexico	9,040 feet 2,755 m	Santa Fe Baldy	12,627 feet 3,849 m	Santa Fe River	5,452 feet 1,662 m	7,175 feet 2,187 m	35.51°N 105.98°W
45	Fremont County	Colorado	9,028 feet 2,752 m	Bushnell Peak	13,111 feet 3,996 m	Arkansas River	4,945 feet 1,507 m	8,166 feet 2,489 m	38.47°N 105.44°W
46	Colfax County	New Mexico	9,017 feet 2,748 m	Little Costilla Peak	12,589 feet 3,837 m	Canadian River	5,445 feet 1,660 m	7,144 feet 2,177 m	36.61°N 104.64°W
47	Yakutat Borough	Alaska	9,004 feet 2,744 m	Mount Saint Elias (Note: Mount Saint Elias is the highest summit of the Saint Elias Mountains and the second highest major summit of both Canada and the United States.)	18,008 feet 5,489 m	Gulf of Alaska	sea level	18,008 feet 5,489 m	59.55°N 139.73°W
48	Piute County	Utah	8,982 feet 2,738 m	Delano Peak (Note: Delano Peak is the highest summit of the Tushar Mountains.)	12,174 feet 3,711 m	Sevier River	5,790 feet 1,765 m	6,384 feet 1,946 m	38.34°N 112.13°W
49	Las Animas County	Colorado	8,978 feet 2,736 m	West Spanish Peak (Note: West Spanish Peak is the higher summit of the two Spanish Peaks. Both Spanish Peaks are the easternmost points of their respective elevation in the United States. The Spanish Peaks were important historic landmarks along the Santa Fe Trail.)	13,631 feet 4,155 m	Purgatoire River	4,324 feet 1,318 m	9,307 feet 2,837 m	37.32°N 104.04°W
50	Montezuma County	Colorado	8,920 feet 2,719 m	Hesperus Mountain (Note: Hesperus Mountain is the highest summit of the La Plata Mountains.)	13,237 feet 4,035 m	San Juan River	4,602 feet 1,403 m	8,635 feet 2,632 m	37.34°N 108.60°W

== Gallery ==
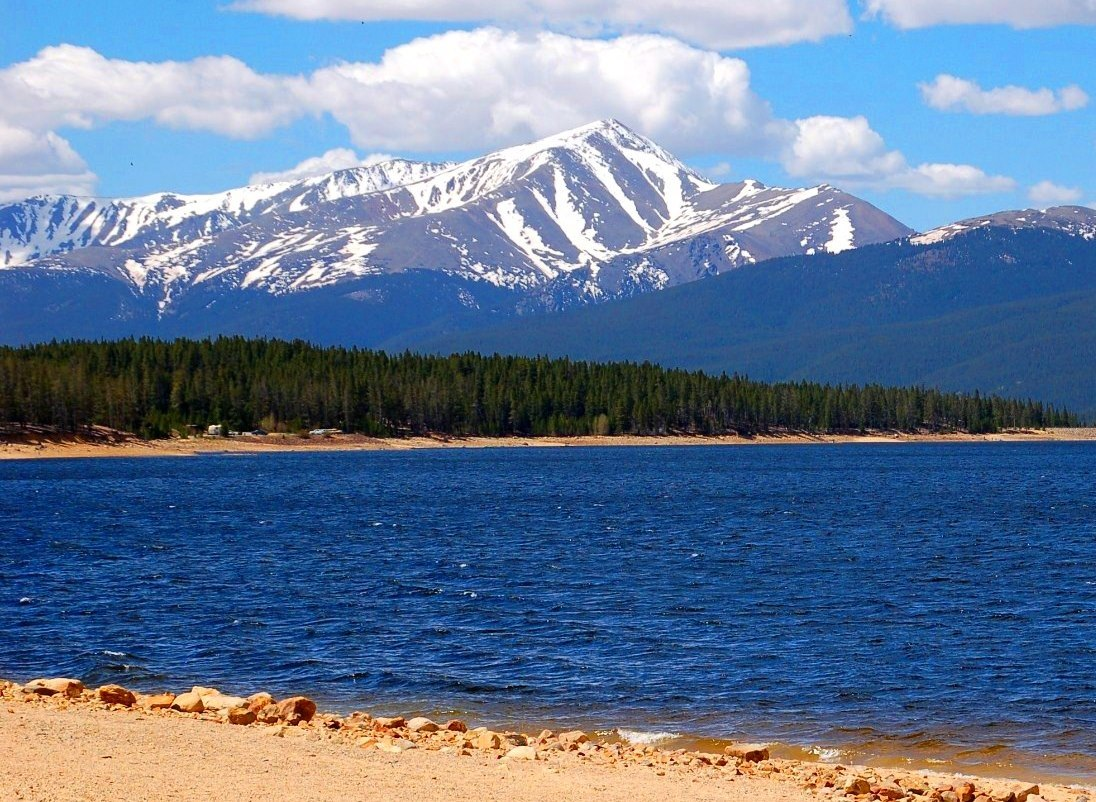
Mount Elbert in Lake County, Colorado (1)

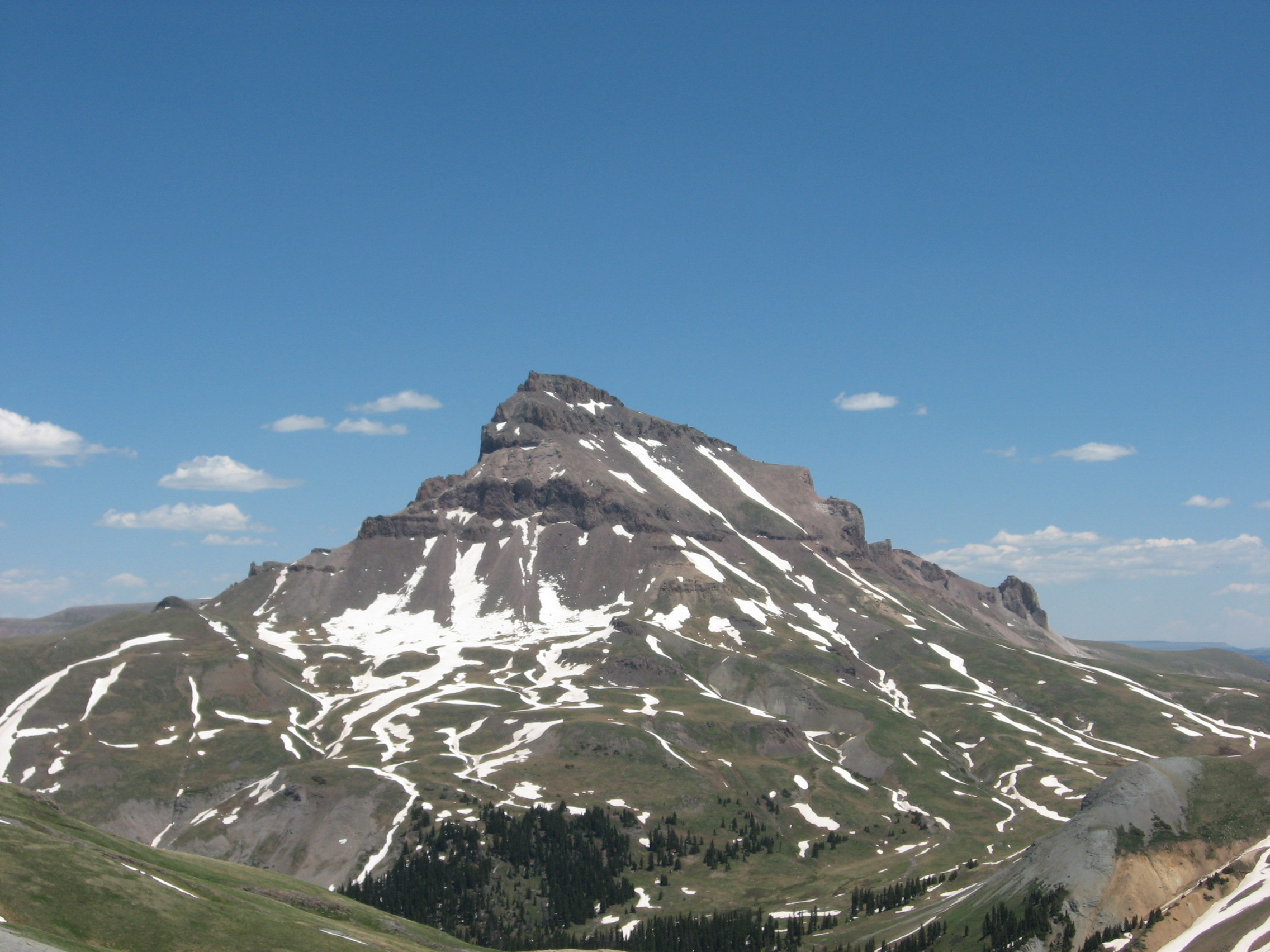
Uncompahgre Peak in Hinsdale County, Colorado (2)

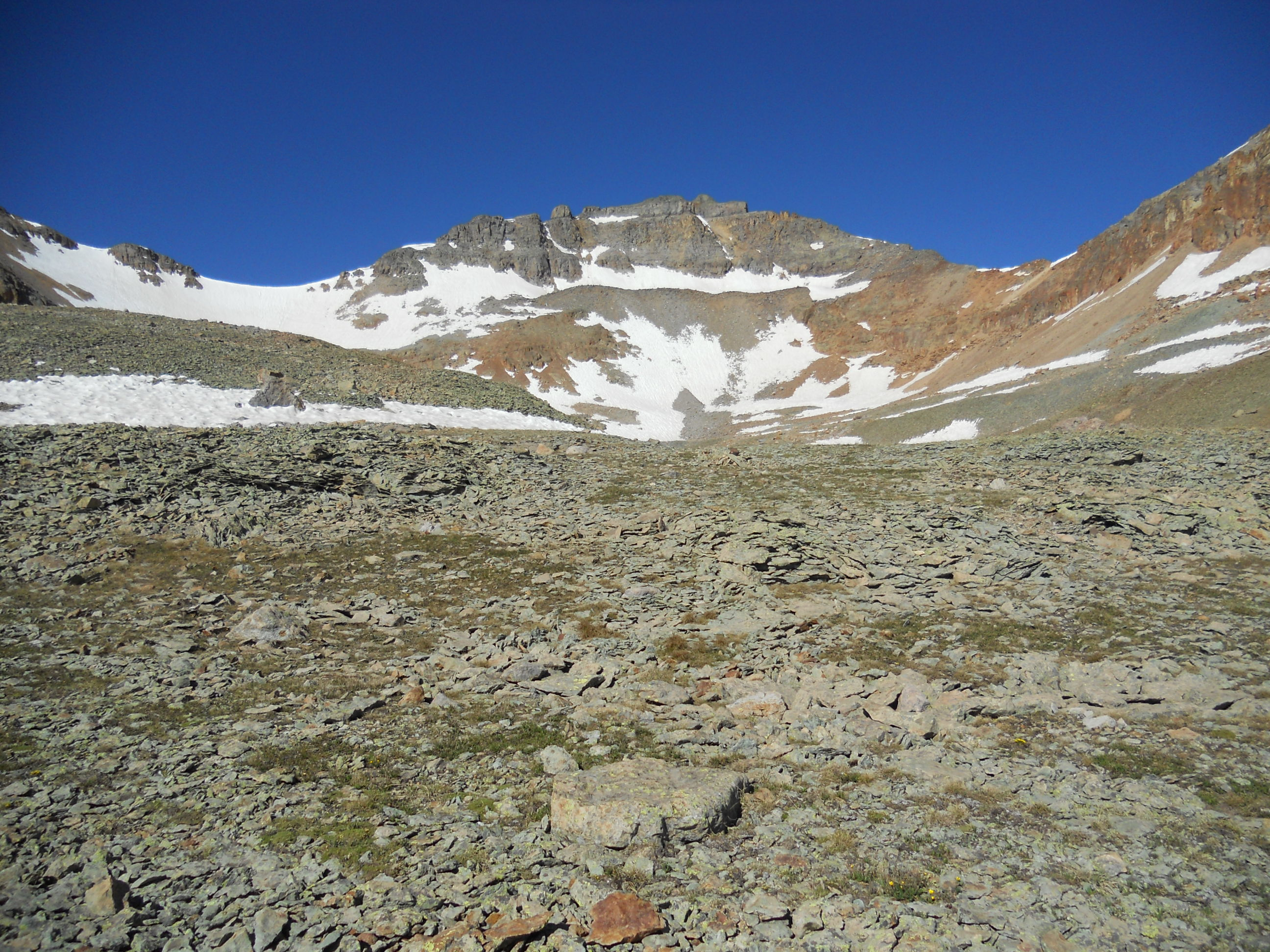
Vermilion Peak straddling San Juan (4) and San Miguel (30) counties, Colorado

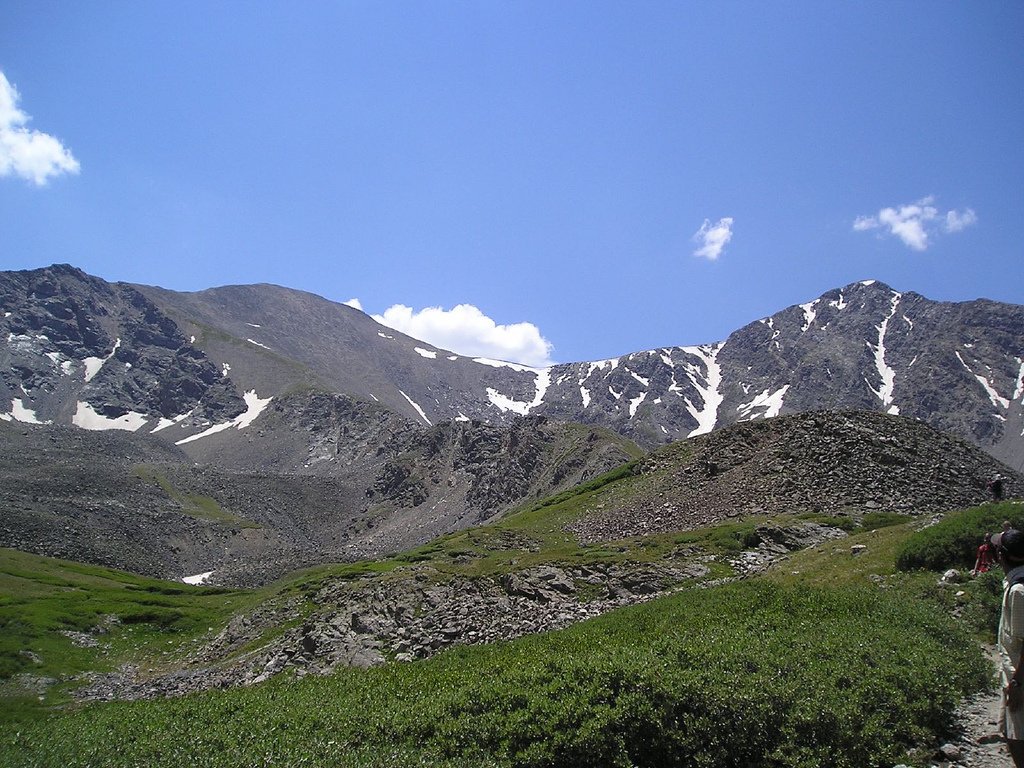
Grays Peak straddling Summit (5) and Clear Creek (11) counties, Colorado

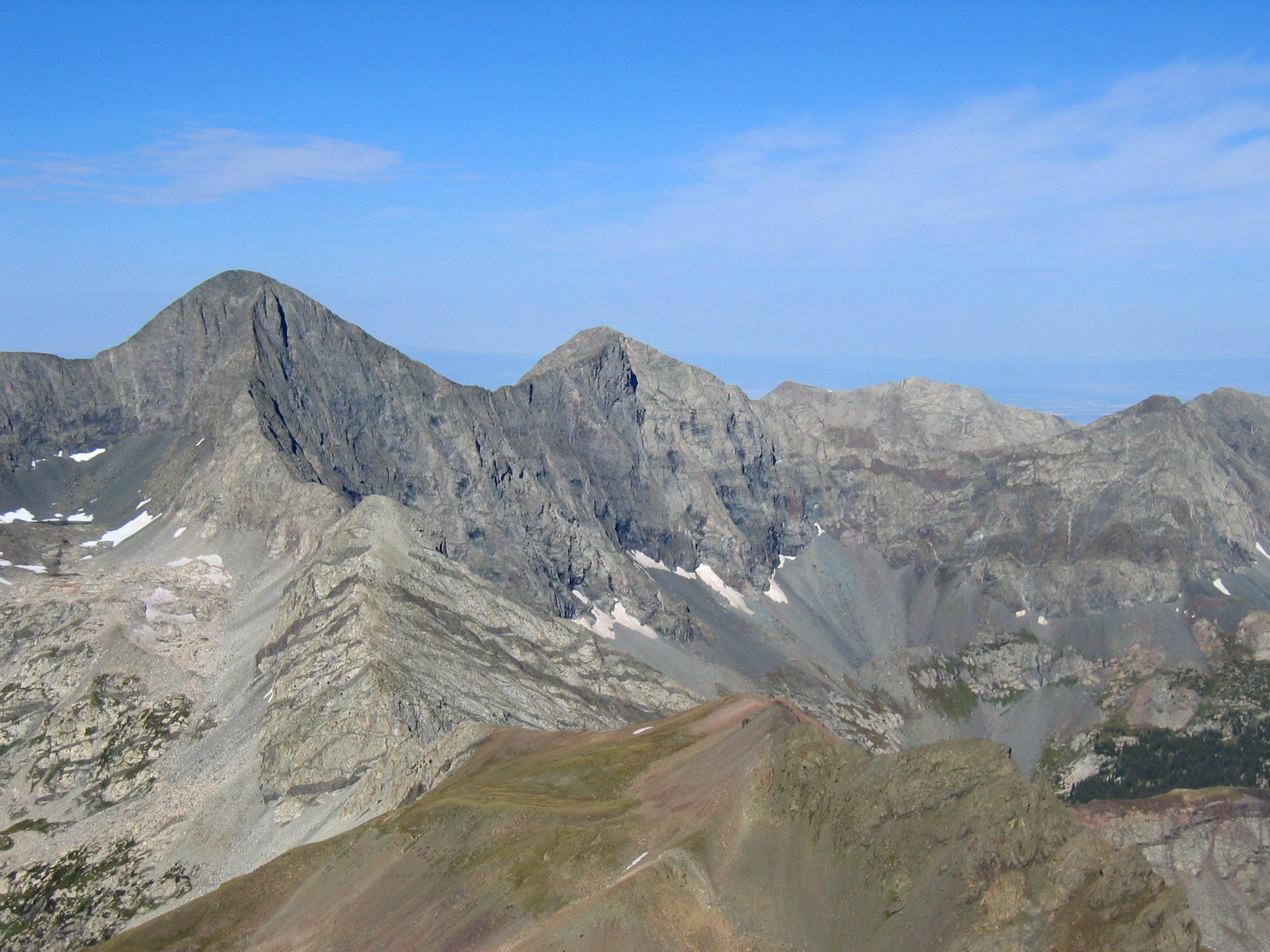
Mount Blanca straddling Alamosa (6) and Costilla (8) counties, with Huerfano (27) county at right, Colorado

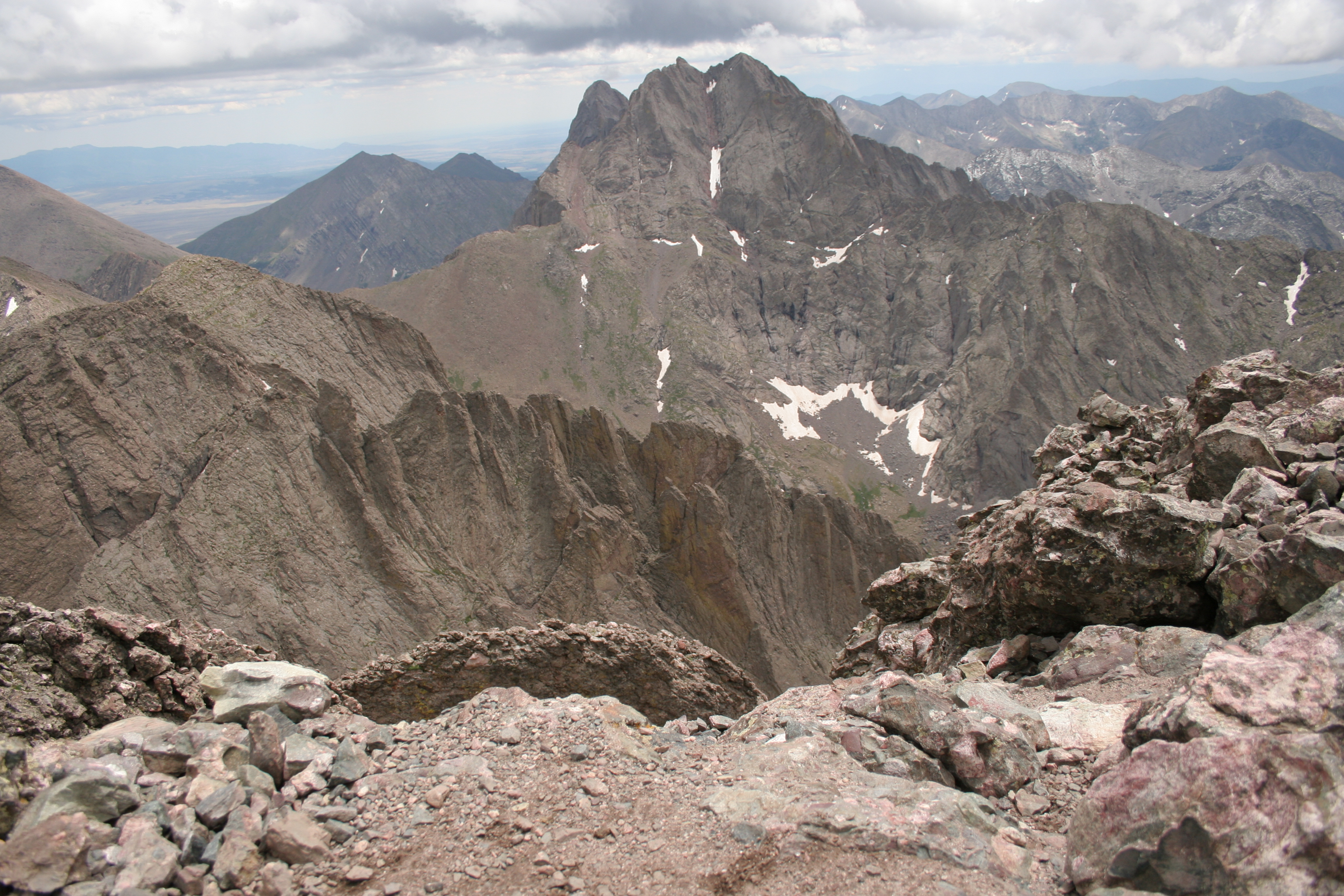
Crestone Peak in Saguache County, Colorado (7)

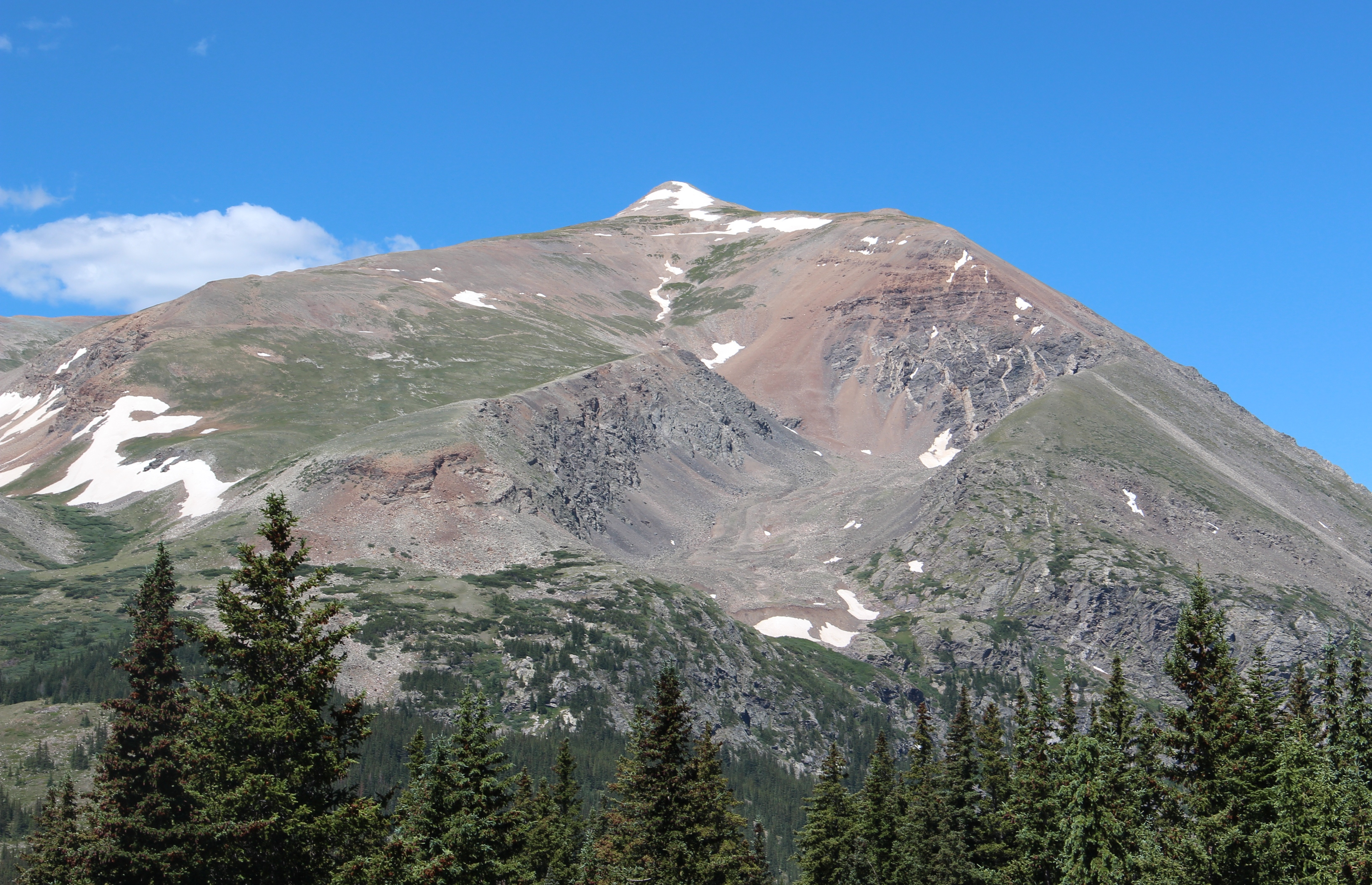
Mount Lincoln in Park County, Colorado (9)

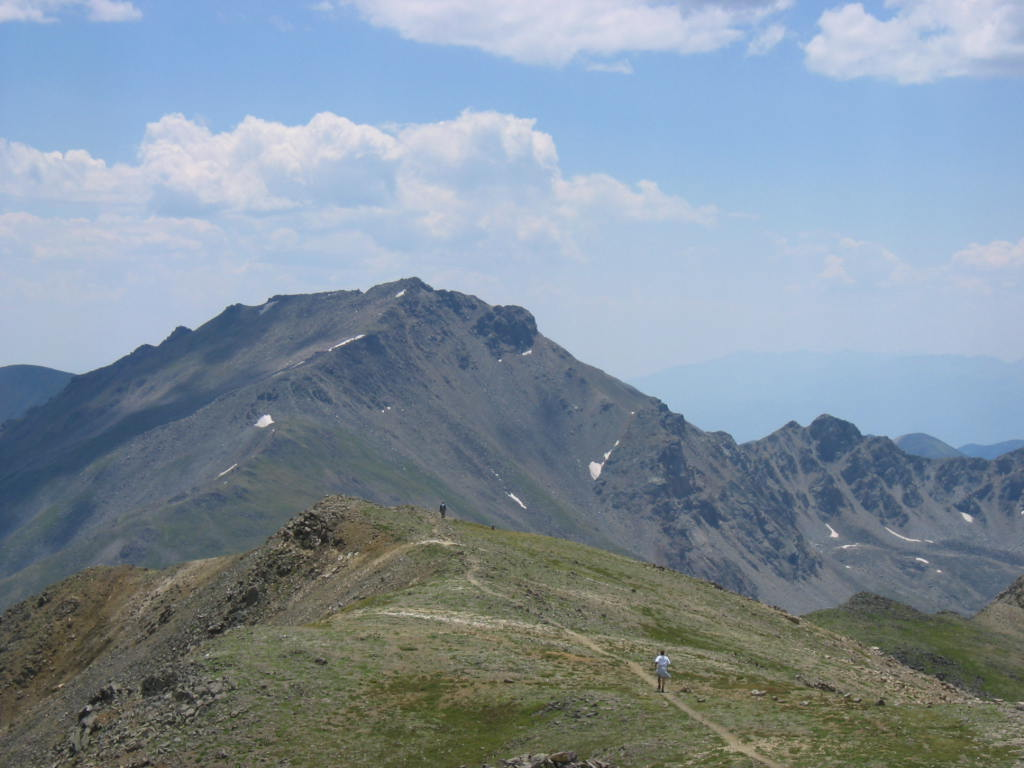
Mount Harvard in Chaffee County, Colorado (10)

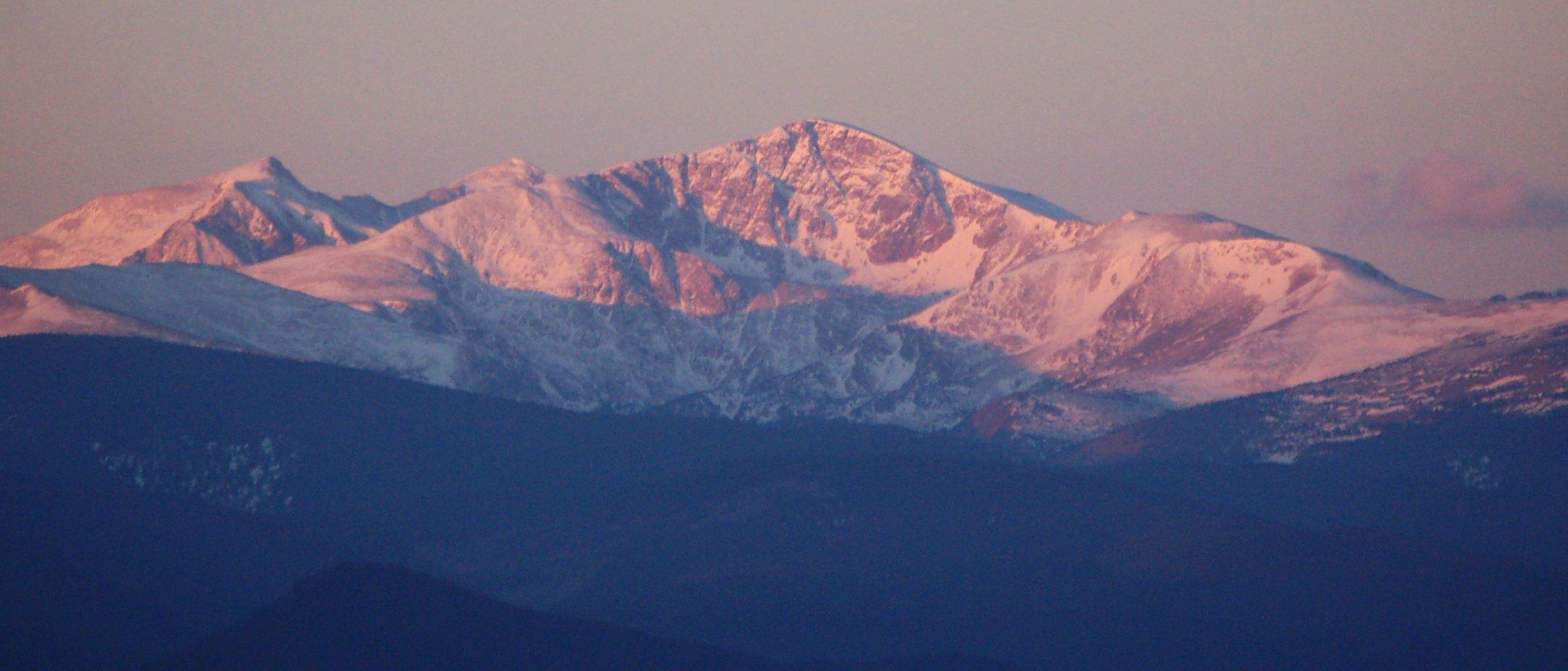
James Peak is the intersection of Clear Creek (11), Grand (18), and Gilpin (20) counties, Colorado

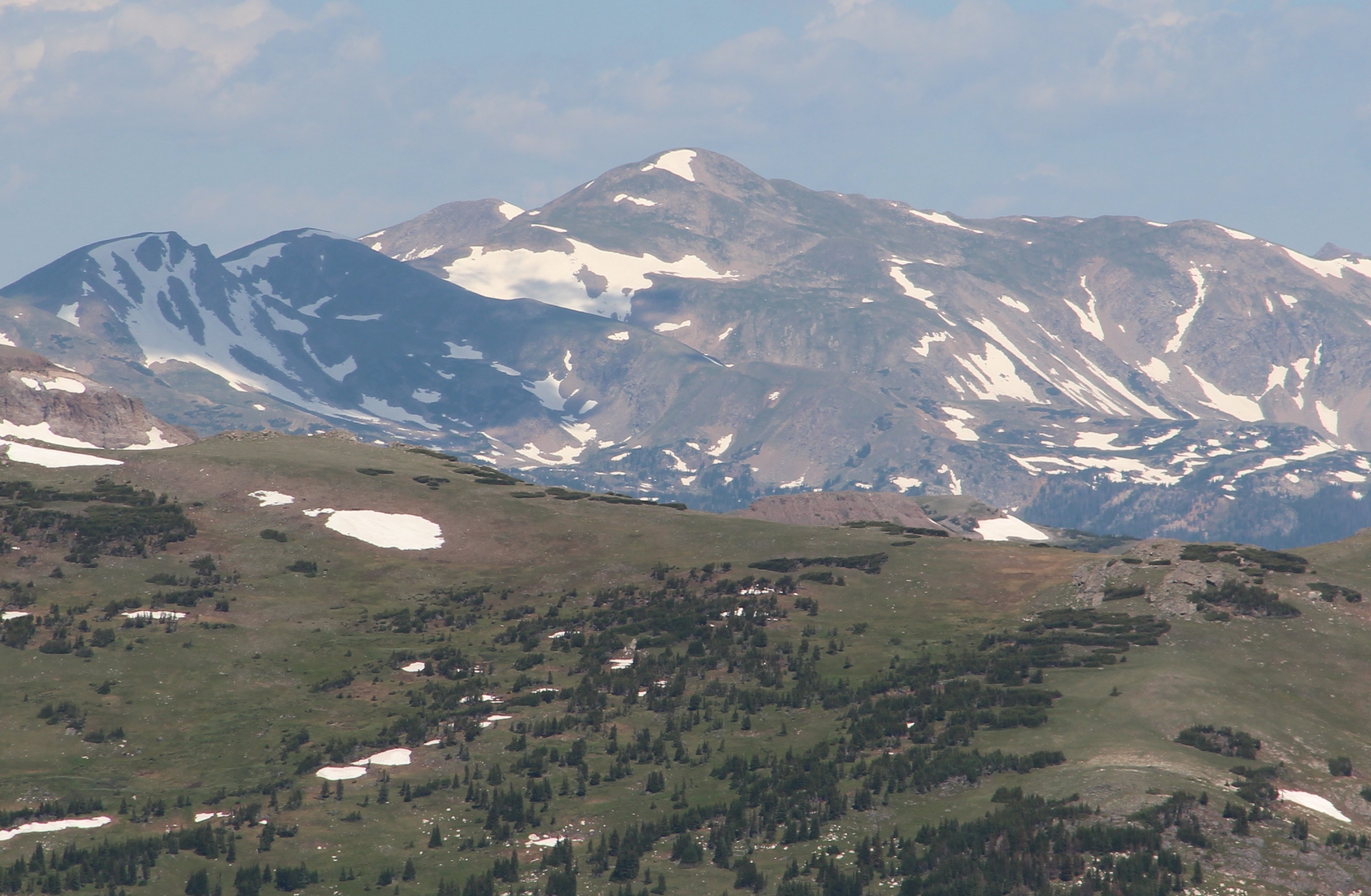
Clark Peak straddling Jackson (13) and Larimer (41) counties, Colorado

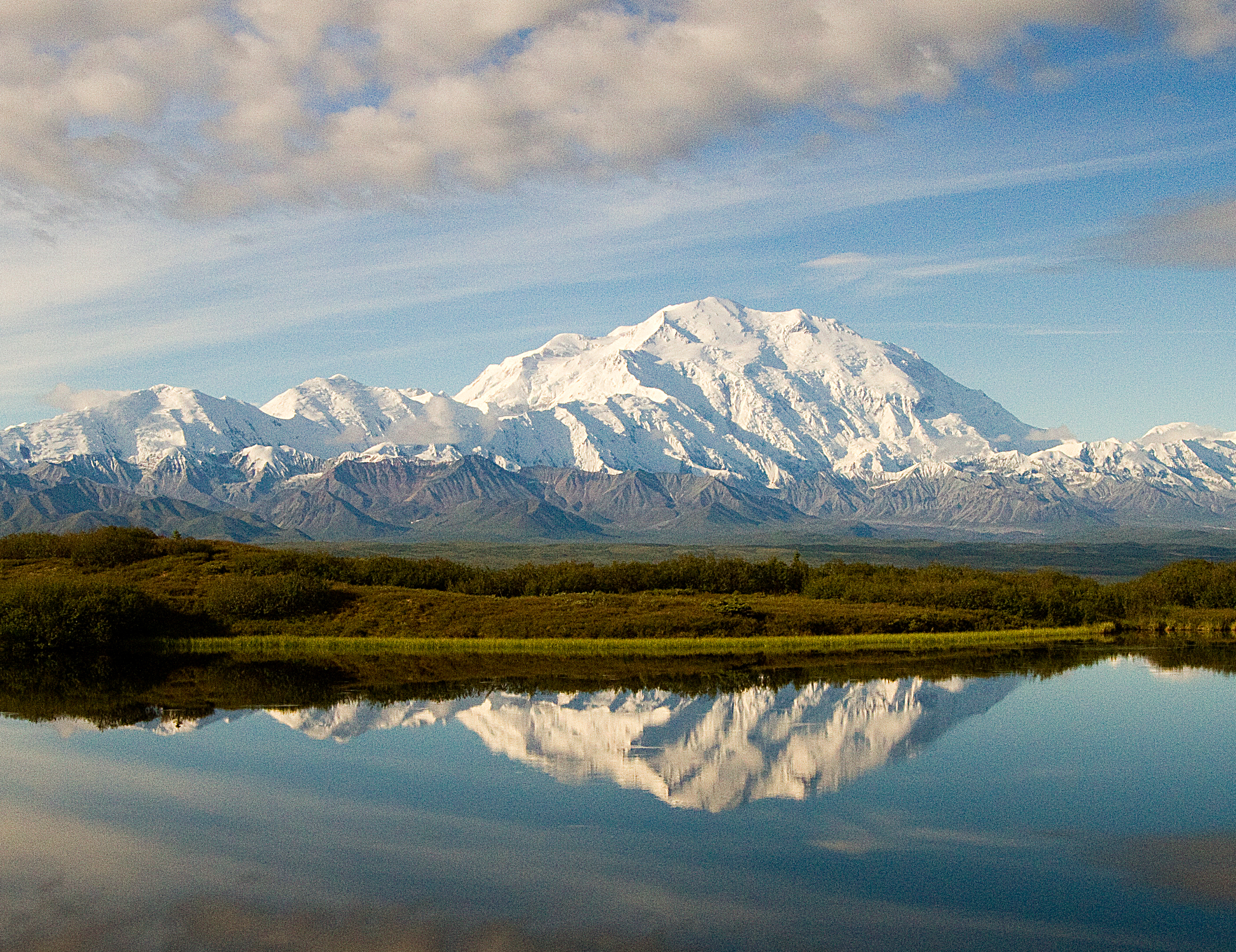
Denali in Denali Borough, Alaska (14)

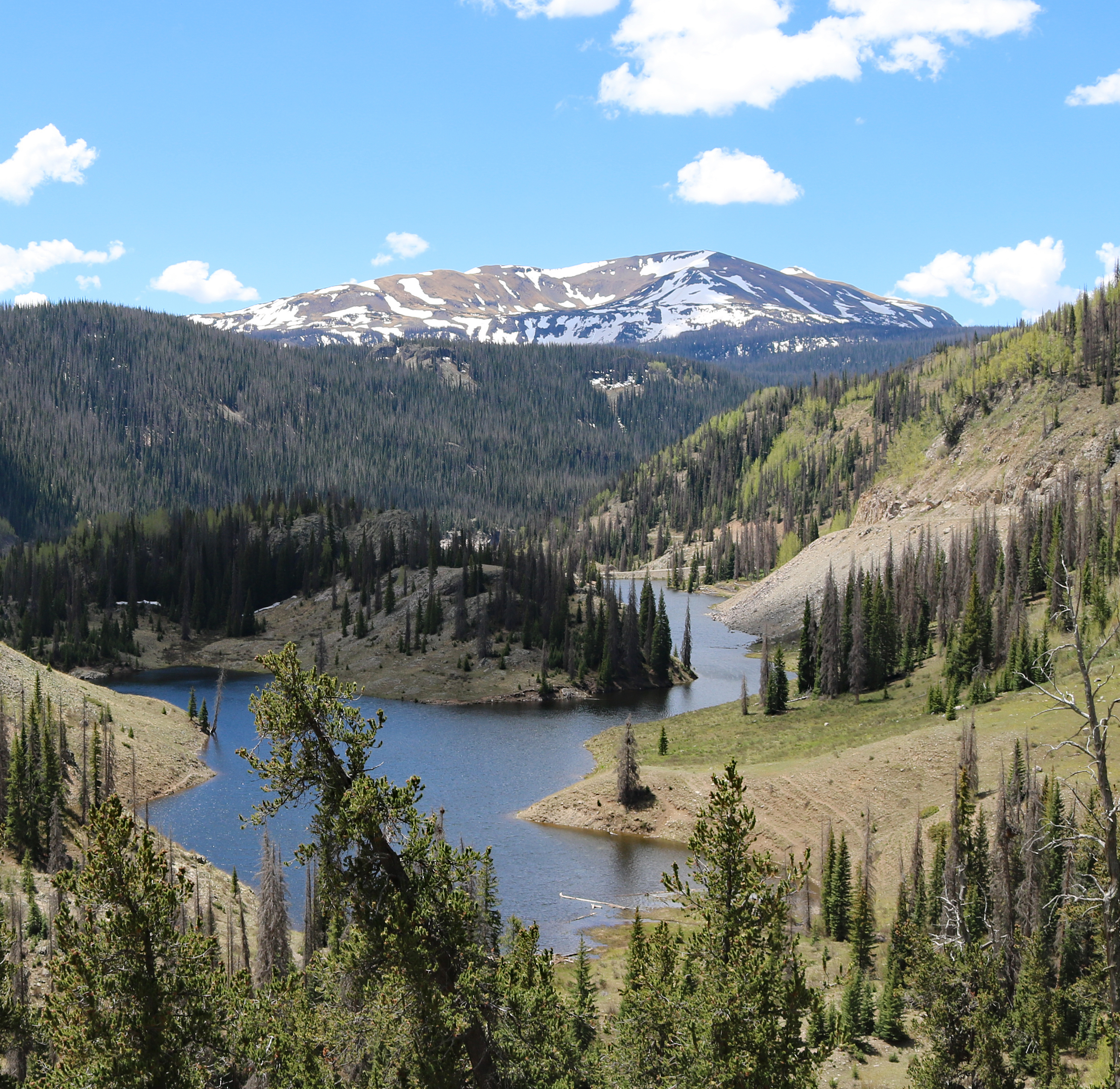
Conejos Peak in Conejos County, Colorado (15)

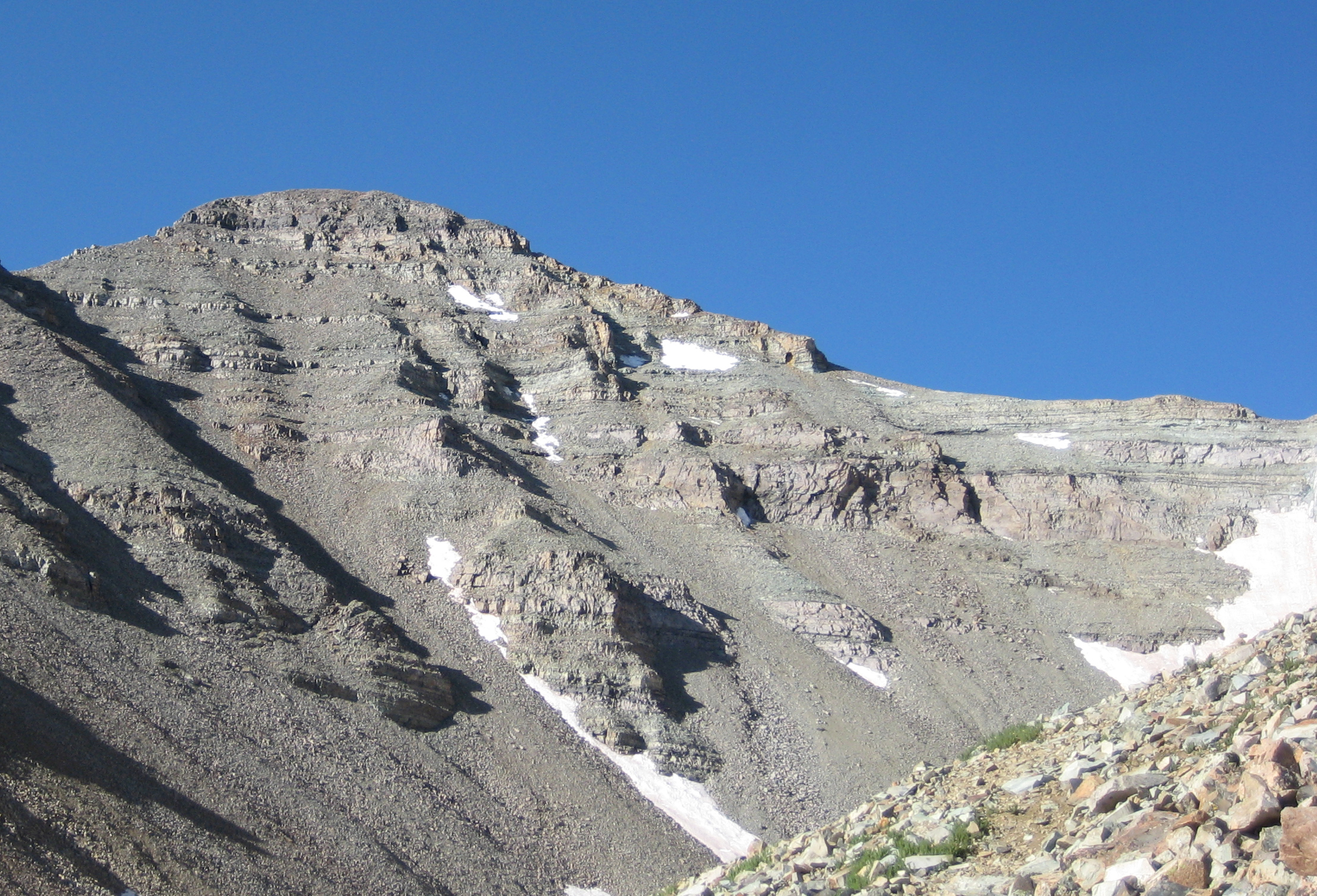
Castle Peak straddling Pitkin (16) and Gunnison (21) counties, Colorado

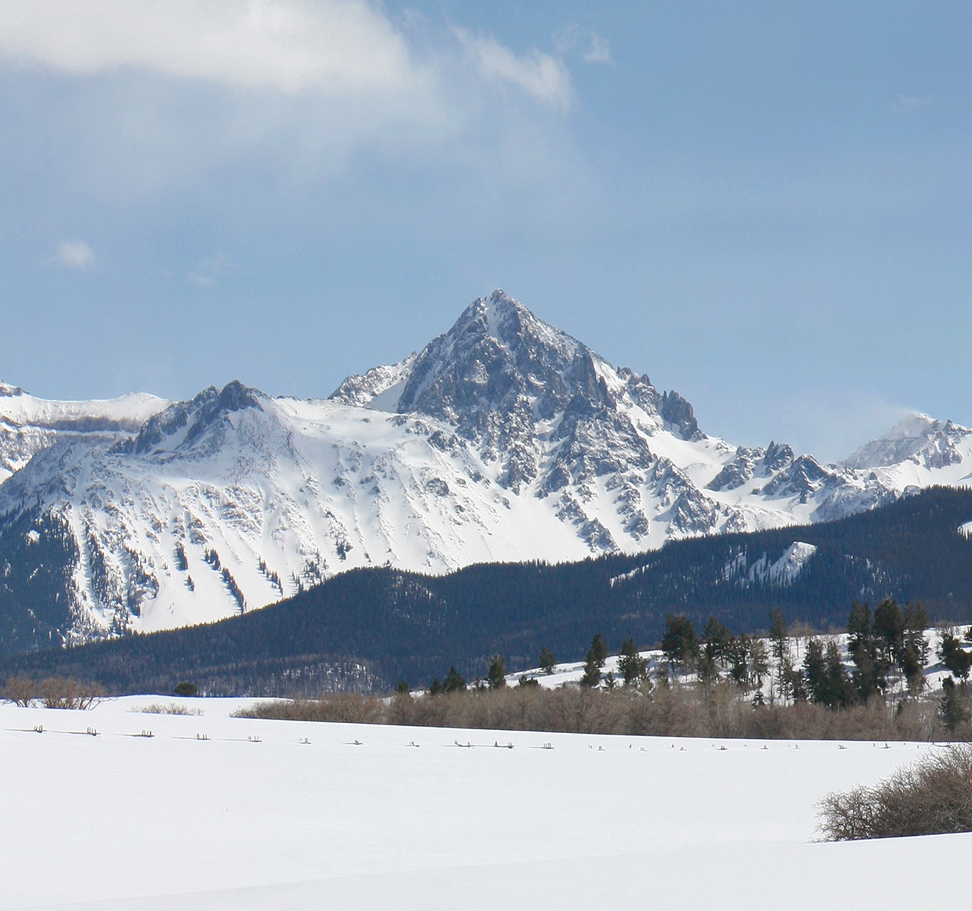
Mount Sneffels in Ouray County, Colorado (17)

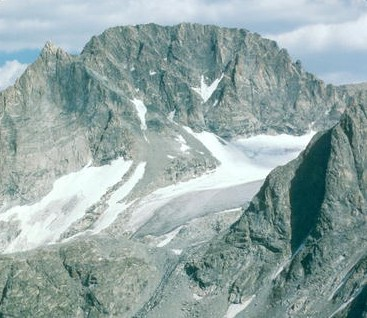
Gannett Peak straddling Sublette (19) and Fremont (40) counties, Wyoming

== See also ==
- Lists of counties in the United States
  - Index of U.S. counties
  - List of United States counties and county equivalents
- Lists of highest points
- Geography of the United States
- Outline of the United States
