= Gilbert Peak =

Gilbert Peak may refer to:

- Gilbert Peak (Utah)
- Gilbert Peak (Washington)
