= List of highest U.S. county high points =

List of the highest county high points of the United States

An enlargeable map of the counties and county equivalents located in the 50 U.S. states and Washington, D.C. as of 2020. Connecticut's nine councils of government and the 100 county equivalents in the U.S. territories are not on this map.

The following table lists the 60 highest United States county or county-equivalent (Note: Forty-eight U.S. states have counties, Louisiana has parishes, and Alaska has boroughs and census areas in the Unorganized Borough. The entire District of Columbia is considered a county-equivalent, as are the 38 independent cities of Virginia, and the independent cities of Baltimore, Maryland, St. Louis, Missouri, and Carson City, Nevada.) high points. (Note: The high point of an area is the point of maximum topographic elevation. The high point may, or may not, be a summit.) The highest U.S. county high point is the summit of Denali in the Denali Borough of Alaska, the highest summit of the United States and all of North America. Of these 60 highest county high points, 32 are located in Colorado, seven in California, six each in Alaska and Wyoming, three in New Mexico, two each in Utah and Nevada, and one each in Washington and Hawaiʻi. Use the OpenStreetMap link below to view the location of these county high points.

== Highest U.S. county high points ==
The 60 highest United States county high points
Rank (Note: Rank among United States counties and county-equivalents by high point elevation.)	County.	State	High point	Highest elevation (Note: Topographic elevations are adjusted to the North American Vertical Datum of 1988 (NAVD 88).)	Low point (Note: The low point of an area is the point of minimum topographic elevation. The low point is often a gulch, stream, river, reservoir, lake, ocean, or endorheic basin.)	Lowest elevation	Mean elevation (Note: The "mean of extremes" elevation is the arithmetic mean of the highest and lowest elevations.)	Elevation range (Note: The elevation range is the arithmetic difference between the highest and lowest elevations.)	High point coordinates (Note: Geodetic coordinates are adjusted to the World Geodetic System of 1984 (WGS 84).)
1	Denali Borough (Note: The Denali Borough, Alaska has the greatest elevation range of any U.S. county or county-equivalent at 19,925 feet (6,073 m).)	Alaska	Denali (Note: The summit of Denali is the highest point in the United States and all of North America with an elevation of 20,310 feet (6,190.5 m). Denali is both the third most topographically prominent summit and the third most topographically isolated summit on Earth after Mount Everest and Aconcagua. Denali is the highest point in the Arctic Ocean Basin.)	20,310 feet 6,190.5 m	Nenana River	385 feet 117 m	10,348 feet 3,154 m	19,925 feet 6,073 m	63.0690°N 151.0063°W
2	Yakutat Borough	Alaska	Mount Saint Elias (Note: Mount Saint Elias is the highest summit of the Saint Elias Mountains and the second highest major summit of both Canada and the United States.)	18,008 feet 5,489 m	Gulf of Alaska	sea level	9,004 feet 2,744 m	18,008 feet 5,489 m	60.2927°N 140.9307°W
3	Copper River Census Area	Alaska	Mount Bona	16,550 feet 5,044 m	Copper River	328 feet 100 m	8,439 feet 2,572 m	16,222 feet 4,944 m	61.3856°N 141.7495°W
4	Hoonah–Angoon Census Area	Alaska	Mount Fairweather (Note: Mount Fairweather is the highest summit of the Fairweather Range.)	15,325 feet 4,671 m	Gulf of Alaska	sea level	7,662 feet 2,335 m	15,325 feet 4,671 m	58.9064°N 137.5265°W
5	Matanuska-Susitna Borough	Alaska	Mount Hunter	14,573 feet 4,442 m	Cook Inlet	sea level	7,286 feet 2,221 m	14,573 feet 4,442 m	62.9504°N 151.0915°W
6	Tulare County	California	Mount Whitney (Note: Mount Whitney is the highest summit of the Sierra Nevada and the State of California. Mount Whitney is the highest point of both the San Joaquin Basin and the Great Basin.)	14,504.6 feet 4,421.0 m	Kings River	285 feet 87 m	7,395 feet 2,254 m	14,220 feet 4,334 m	36.5786°N 118.2924°W
6	Inyo County (Note: Inyo County, California, has the sixth highest U.S. county high point and lowest point of all of North America for a county elevation range of 14,787 feet (4,507 m), the greatest south of Alaska.)	California	Mount Whitney	14,504.6 feet 4,421.0 m	Badwater Basin (Note: The Badwater Basin, an endorheic basin in Death Valley, is the lowest point in the United States and all of North America with an elevation of −282 feet (−86 m).)	−282 feet −86 m	7,111 feet 2,167 m	14,787 feet 4,507 m	36.5786°N 118.2924°W
8	Lake County (Note: Lake County, Colorado is the highest county in the United States by mean elevation at 11,702 feet (3,567 m).)	Colorado	Mount Elbert (Note: Mount Elbert is the highest summit of the Rocky Mountains of the United States and Canada. Mount Elbert is the highest summit of the State of Colorado and the highest point in the Mississippi River Basin.)	14,439.6 feet 4,401.2 m	Arkansas River (Note: The point where the Arkansas River flows out of Lake County and into Chaffee County, Colorado, is the highest county low point in the United States at 8,965 feet (2,733 m) elevation.)	8,965 feet 2,733 m	11,702 feet 3,567 m	5,475 feet 1,669 m	39.1178°N 106.4453°W
9	Chaffee County	Colorado	Mount Harvard (Note: Mount Harvard is the highest summit of the Collegiate Peaks and the easternmost point of its elevation in the United States.)	14,421.3 feet 4,395.6 m	Arkansas River	6,895 feet 2,102 m	10,658 feet 3,249 m	7,526 feet 2,294 m	38.9245°N 106.3208°W
10	Pierce County	Washington	Mount Rainier (Note: Mount Rainier is the highest summit of the State of Washington and the highest summit of the Cascade Range of the United States and Canada.)	14,417 feet 4,394 m	Puget Sound	sea level	7,208 feet 2,197 m	14,417 feet 4,394 m	46.8529°N 121.7604°W
11	Alamosa County	Colorado	Blanca Peak (Note: Blanca Peak is the highest summit of the Sangre de Cristo Range and the easternmost point of its elevation in the United States. Blanca Peak is the highest point in the Rio Grande Basin of the United States and México.)	14,351 feet 4,374 m	Rio Grande	7,506 feet 2,288 m	10,928 feet 3,331 m	6,845 feet 2,086 m	37.5775°N 105.4856°W
11	Costilla County	Colorado	Blanca Peak	14,351 feet 4,374 m	Rio Grande	7,380 feet 2,249 m	10,866 feet 3,312 m	6,971 feet 2,125 m	37.5775°N 105.4856°W
13	Huerfano County	Colorado	Blanca Peak Tripoint (Note: The Blanca Peak Tripoint is located 140 feet (43 m) north-northeast and 25 feet (7.6 m) below the summit of Blanca Peak. The Tripoint is the junction of Alamosa, Costilla, and Huerfano counties, Colorado. This point gave surveyors a better point to set the intersection of the three counties than the summit itself.)	14,326 feet 4,367 m	Cucharas River	5,232 feet 1,595 m	9,779 feet 2,981 m	9,094 feet 2,772 m	37.5778°N 105.4854°W
14	Hinsdale County	Colorado	Uncompahgre Peak (Note: Uncompahgre Peak is the highest summit of the San Juan Mountains. Uncompahgre Peak is the highest point in the Colorado River Basin of the United States and México.)	14,315 feet 4,363 m	Lake Fork Gunnison River	8,285 feet 2,525 m	11,300 feet 3,444 m	6,030 feet 1,838 m	38.0717°N 107.4622°W
15	Saguache County	Colorado	Crestone Peak	14,300 feet 4,359 m	San Luis Creek	7,530 feet 2,295 m	10,915 feet 3,327 m	6,770 feet 2,063 m	37.9669°N 105.5855°W
16	Park County	Colorado	Mount Lincoln (Note: Mount Lincoln is the highest summit of the Mosquito Range.)	14,293 feet 4,356.5 m	South Platte River	7,118 feet 2,170 m	10,706 feet 3,263 m	7,175 feet 2,187 m	39.3515°N 106.1116°W
17	Pitkin County	Colorado	Castle Peak (Note: Castle Peak is the highest summit of the Elk Mountains.)	14,278.9 feet 4,352.2 m	Crystal River	6,260 feet 1,908 m	10,269 feet 3,130 m	8,019 feet 2,444 m	39.0096°N 106.8613°W
17	Gunnison County	Colorado	Castle Peak	14,278.9 feet 4,352.2 m	North Fork Gunnison River	5,910 feet 1,801 m	10,094 feet 3,077 m	8,369 feet 2,551 m	39.0096°N 106.8613°W
19	Summit County	Colorado	Grays Peak (Note: Grays Peak is the highest summit of the Front Range and the highest point on the Continental Divide in North America.)	14,276 feet 4,351 m	Blue River	7,595 feet 2,315 m	10,936 feet 3,333 m	6,681 feet 2,036 m	39.6337°N 105.8176°W
19	Clear Creek County	Colorado	Grays Peak	14,276 feet 4,351 m	Clear Creek	6,940 feet 2,115 m	10,608 feet 3,233 m	7,336 feet 2,236 m	39.6337°N 105.8176°W
21	Custer County	Colorado	Crestone East Peak (Note: Crestone East Peak is located 432 feet (132 m) east-northeast and 34 feet (10.4 m) below the summit of Crestone Peak.)	14,266 feet 4,348 m	Hardscrabble Creek	5,885 feet 1,794 m	10,076 feet 3,071 m	8,381 feet 2,555 m	37.9673°N 105.5840°W
22	Boulder County	Colorado	Longs Peak (Note: Longs Peak is the highest summit of the northern Front Range.)	14,260 feet 4,346 m	Saint Vrain Creek	4,895 feet 1,492 m	9,578 feet 2,919 m	9,365 feet 2,854 m	40.2549°N 105.6161°W
23	Dolores County	Colorado	Mount Wilson (Note: Mount Wilson is the highest summit of the San Miguel Mountains.)	14,252 feet 4,344 m	Spook Canyon	5,190 feet 1,582 m	9,721 feet 2,963 m	9,062 feet 2,762 m	37.8391°N 107.9916°W
23	Mono County	California	White Mountain Peak (Note: White Mountain Peak is the highest summit of the White Mountains.)	14,252 feet 4,344 m	Owens River	4,652 feet 1,418 m	9,452 feet 2,881 m	9,600 feet 2,926 m	37.6341°N 118.2557°W
25	Fresno County	California	North Palisade (Note: North Palisade is the highest summit of the central Sierra Nevada.)	14,248 feet 4,343 m	San Joaquin River	118 feet 36 m	7,183 feet 2,189 m	14,130 feet 4,307 m	37.0942°N 118.5145°W
26	Siskiyou County	California	Mount Shasta (Note: Mount Shasta is the highest summit of the Cascade Range in California.)	14,168 feet 4,318 m	Klamath River	475 feet 145 m	7,322 feet 2,232 m	13,693 feet 4,174 m	41.4090°N 122.1949°W
27	Ouray County	Colorado	Mount Sneffels (Note: Mount Sneffels is the highest summit of the Sneffels Range.)	14,158.1 feet 4,315.4 m	Uncompahgre River	6,340 feet 1,932 m	10,249 feet 3,124 m	7,818 feet 2,383 m	38.0038°N 107.7923°W
28	El Paso County	Colorado	Pikes Peak (Note: Pikes Peak is the highest summit of the southern Front Range and the easternmost point of its elevation in the United States.)	14,115.2 feet 4,302.31 m	Chico Creek	5,045 feet 1,538 m	9,580 feet 2,920 m	9,070 feet 2,765 m	38.8405°N 105.0446°W
29	La Plata County	Colorado	Windom Peak (Note: Windom Peak is the highest summit of the Needle Mountains.)	14,093 feet 4,296 m	Animas River	5,930 feet 1,807 m	10,012 feet 3,052 m	8,163 feet 2,488 m	37.6212°N 107.5919°W
30	San Miguel County	Colorado	Wilson Peak (Note: Wilson Peak is located 1.51 miles (2.43 km) north-northeast and 229 feet (70 m) lower than the summit of Mount Wilson.)	14,023 feet 4,274 m	Dolores River	5,310 feet 1,618 m	9,666 feet 2,946 m	8,713 feet 2,656 m	37.8603°N 107.9847°W
31	Eagle County	Colorado	Mount of the Holy Cross (Note: Mount of the Holy Cross is the highest summit of the northern Sawatch Range.)	14,011 feet 4,271 m	Colorado River	6,125 feet 1,867 m	10,068 feet 3,069 m	7,886 feet 2,404 m	39.4667°N 106.4817°W
32	Mineral County	Colorado	Phoenix Peak	13,902 feet 4,237 m	Rio Grande	8,330 feet 2,539 m	11,116 feet 3,388 m	5,572 feet 1,698 m	37.9363°N 106.8664°W
33	San Juan County	Colorado	Vermilion Peak	13,900 feet 4,237 m	Animas River	8,270 feet 2,521 m	11,085 feet 3,379 m	5,630 feet 1,716 m	37.7993°N 107.8285°W
34	Southeast Fairbanks Census Area	Alaska	Mount Hayes (Note: Mount Hayes is the highest summit of the Hayes Range.)	13,832 feet 4,216 m	Tanana River	1,040 feet 317 m	7,436 feet 2,266 m	12,792 feet 3,899 m	63.6203°N 146.7178°W
35	Sublette County	Wyoming	Gannett Peak (Note: Gannett Peak is the highest summit of the Wind River Range, the Central Rocky Mountains, and the State of Wyoming. Gannett Peak is the highest point in the Green River Basin.)	13,809.4 feet 4,209.1 m	Green River	6,570 feet 2,003 m	10,190 feet 3,106 m	7,239 feet 2,206 m	43.1844°N 109.6543°W
35	Fremont County	Wyoming	Gannett Peak	13,809.4 feet 4,209.1 m	Wind River	4,558 feet 1,389 m	9,184 feet 2,799 m	9,251 feet 2,820 m	43.1844°N 109.6543°W
37	Hawaiʻi County	Hawaiʻi	Mauna Kea (Note: Mauna Kea is the highest summit of the Island of Hawaiʻi, the State of Hawaiʻi, and the entire North Pacific Ocean. Mauna Kea is the tallest mountain on Earth if measured from its base at −19,684 feet (−6,000 m) below the surface of the Pacific Ocean to its summit at 13,796 feet (4,205 m) for a total of 33,480 feet (10,205 m).)	13,796 feet 4,205 m	Pacific Ocean	sea level	6,898 feet 2,103 m	13,796 feet 4,205 m	19.8207°N 155.4680°W
38	Teton County	Wyoming	Grand Teton (Note: Grand Teton is the highest summit of the Teton Range. Grand Teton is the highest point in the Columbia River drainage basin of Canada and the United States.)	13,775.3 feet 4,198.7 m	Snake River	5,804 feet 1,769 m	9,790 feet 2,984 m	7,971 feet 2,430 m	43.7412°N 110.8025°W
39	Las Animas County	Colorado	West Spanish Peak (Note: West Spanish Peak is the higher summit of the two Spanish Peaks. Both Spanish Peaks are the easternmost points of their respective elevation in the United States. The Spanish Peaks were important historic landmarks along the Santa Fe Trail.)	13,631 feet 4,155 m	Purgatoire River	4,324 feet 1,318 m	8,978 feet 2,736 m	9,307 feet 2,837 m	37.3756°N 104.9934°W
40	Larimer County	Colorado	Hagues Peak (Note: Hagues Peak is the highest summit of the Mummy Range.)	13,566 feet 4,135 m	Cache la Poudre River	4,785 feet 1,458 m	9,176 feet 2,797 m	8,781 feet 2,676 m	40.4845°N 105.6464°W
41	Grand County	Colorado	Pettingell Peak	13,559 feet 4,133 m	Colorado River	6,835 feet 2,083 m	10,197 feet 3,108 m	6,724 feet 2,049 m	39.7286°N 105.9049°W
42	Duchesne County	Utah	Kings Peak (Note: Kings Peak is the highest summit of the Uinta Range, the Western Rocky Mountains, and the State of Utah.)	13,534 feet 4,125 m	Ninemile Creek	4,850 feet 1,478 m	9,192 feet 2,802 m	8,684 feet 2,647 m	40.7763°N 110.3729°W
43	Summit County	Utah	Gilbert Peak (Note: Gilbert Peak is located 3.7 miles (6.0 km) north-northeast and 86 feet (26 m) lower than the summit of Kings Peak.)	13,448 feet 4,099 m	Weber River	5,255 feet 1,602 m	9,352 feet 2,850 m	8,193 feet 2,497 m	40.8235°N 110.3403°W
44	Archuleta County	Colorado	Summit Peak (Note: Summit Peak is the highest summit of the southern San Juan Mountains.)	13,307.7 feet 4,056.2 m	Navajo Reservoir (Note: The elevation of Navajo Reservoir varies seasonally.)	6,027 feet 1,837 m	9,669 feet 2,947 m	7,278 feet 2,218 m	37.3506°N 106.6969°W
45	Gilpin County	Colorado	James Peak	13,300 feet 4,054 m	Clear Creek	6,940 feet 2,115 m	10,120 feet 3,085 m	6,360 feet 1,939 m	39.8520°N 105.6903°W
46	Montezuma County	Colorado	Hesperus Mountain (Note: Hesperus Mountain is the highest summit of the La Plata Mountains.)	13,237 feet 4,035 m	San Juan River	4,602 feet 1,403 m	8,920 feet 2,719 m	8,635 feet 2,632 m	37.4451°N 108.0890°W
47	Rio Grande County	Colorado	Bennett Peak	13,209 feet 4,026 m	Rock Creek	7,595 feet 2,315 m	10,402 feet 3,171 m	5,614 feet 1,711 m	37.4833°N 106.4343°W
48	Conejos County	Colorado	Conejos Peak	13,178 feet 4,017 m	Rio Grande	7,380 feet 2,249 m	10,279 feet 3,133 m	5,798 feet 1,767 m	37.2888°N 106.5708°W
49	Johnson County	Wyoming	Cloud Peak (Note: Cloud Peak is the highest summit of the Bighorn Mountains.)	13,167 feet 4,013.3 m	Powder River	3,695 feet 1,126 m	8,431 feet 2,570 m	9,472 feet 2,887 m	44.3820°N 107.1740°W
49	Big Horn County	Wyoming	Cloud Peak	13,167 feet 4,013.3 m	Bighorn Lake (Note: The elevation of Bighorn Lake varies seasonally.)	3,290 feet 1,003 m	8,228 feet 2,508 m	9,877 feet 3,011 m	44.3820°N 107.1740°W
51	Taos County	New Mexico	Wheeler Peak (Note: Wheeler Peak is the highest summit of the Taos Mountains and the State of New Mexico.)	13,166 feet 4,013 m	Rio Grande	5,882 feet 1,793 m	9,524 feet 2,903 m	7,284 feet 2,220 m	36.5568°N 105.4169°W
52	Park County	Wyoming	Francs Peak (Note: Francs Peak is the highest summit of the Absaroka Range.)	13,158 feet 4,011 m	Yellowstone River	5,550 feet 1,692 m	9,354 feet 2,851 m	7,608 feet 2,319 m	43.9613°N 109.3394°W
53	Esmeralda County	Nevada	Boundary Peak (Note: Boundary Peak is the highest summit of the State of Nevada.)	13,149.6 feet 4,008.0 m	California border	3,715 feet 1,132 m	9,087 feet 2,770 m	8,125 feet 2,476 m	37.8461°N 118.3514°W
54	Madera County	California	Mount Ritter (Note: Mount Ritter is the highest summit of the Ritter Range.)	13,149 feet 4,008 m	San Joaquin River	118 feet 36 m	6,634 feet 2,022 m	13,031 feet 3,972 m	37.6891°N 119.1996°W
55	Tuolumne County	California	Mount Lyell	13,119.8 feet 3,998.9 m	Tuolumne River	300 feet 91 m	6,710 feet 2,045 m	12,820 feet 3,908 m	37.7394°N 119.2716°W
56	Fremont County	Colorado	Bushnell Peak	13,111 feet 3,996 m	Arkansas River	4,945 feet 1,507 m	9,028 feet 2,752 m	8,166 feet 2,489 m	38.3412°N 105.8893°W
57	Rio Arriba County	New Mexico	Truchas Peak (Note: Truchas Peak is the highest summit of the Santa Fe Mountains.)	13,107 feet 3,995 m	Rio Grande	5,535 feet 1,687 m	9,321 feet 2,841 m	7,572 feet 2,308 m	35.9625°N 105.6451°W
57	Mora County	New Mexico	Truchas Peak	13,107 feet 3,995 m	Canadian River	4,668 feet 1,423 m	8,888 feet 2,709 m	8,439 feet 2,572 m	35.9625°N 105.6451°W
59	Teller County	Colorado	Devils Playground (Note: The Devils Playground is located 2.15 miles (3.46 km) northwest and 1,040 feet (317 m) below the summit of Pikes Peak. The Devils Playground is named for the way lightning sometimes dances around the prominence during lightning storms.)	13,075 feet 3,985 m	Fourmile Creek	6,710 feet 2,045 m	9,892 feet 3,015 m	6,365 feet 1,940 m	38.8642°N 105.0705°W
60	White Pine County	Nevada	Wheeler Peak (Note: Wheeler Peak is the highest summit of the Snake Range.)	13,065.3 feet 3,982.3 m	Utah border	5,080 feet 1,548 m	9,073 feet 2,765 m	7,985 feet 2,434 m	38.9858°N 114.3139°W

== Gallery ==
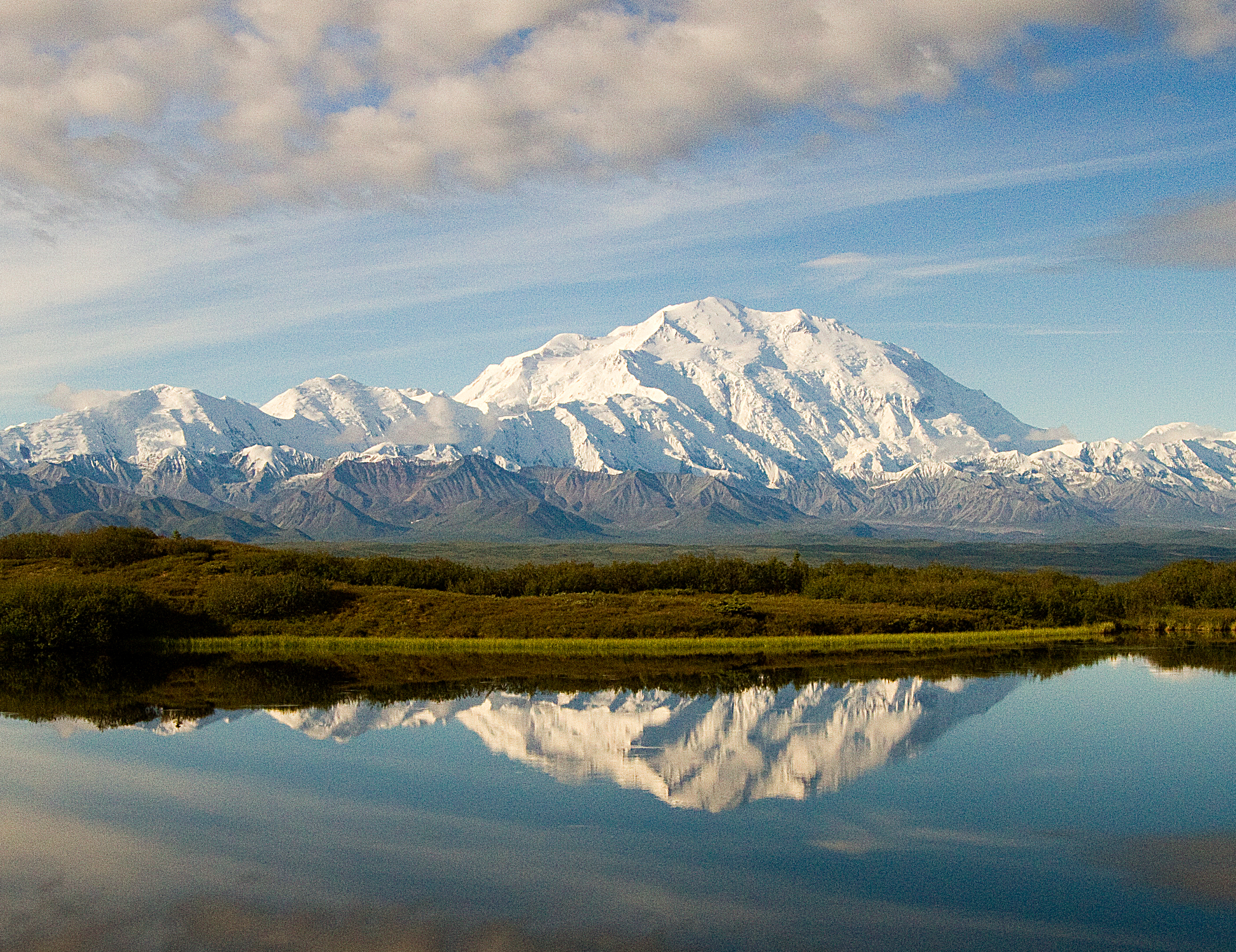
1. Denali in Denali Borough, Alaska

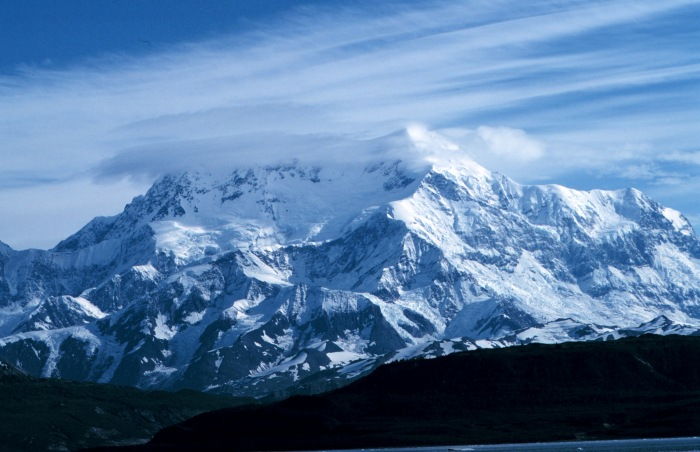
2. Mount Saint Elias in Yakutat Borough, Alaska

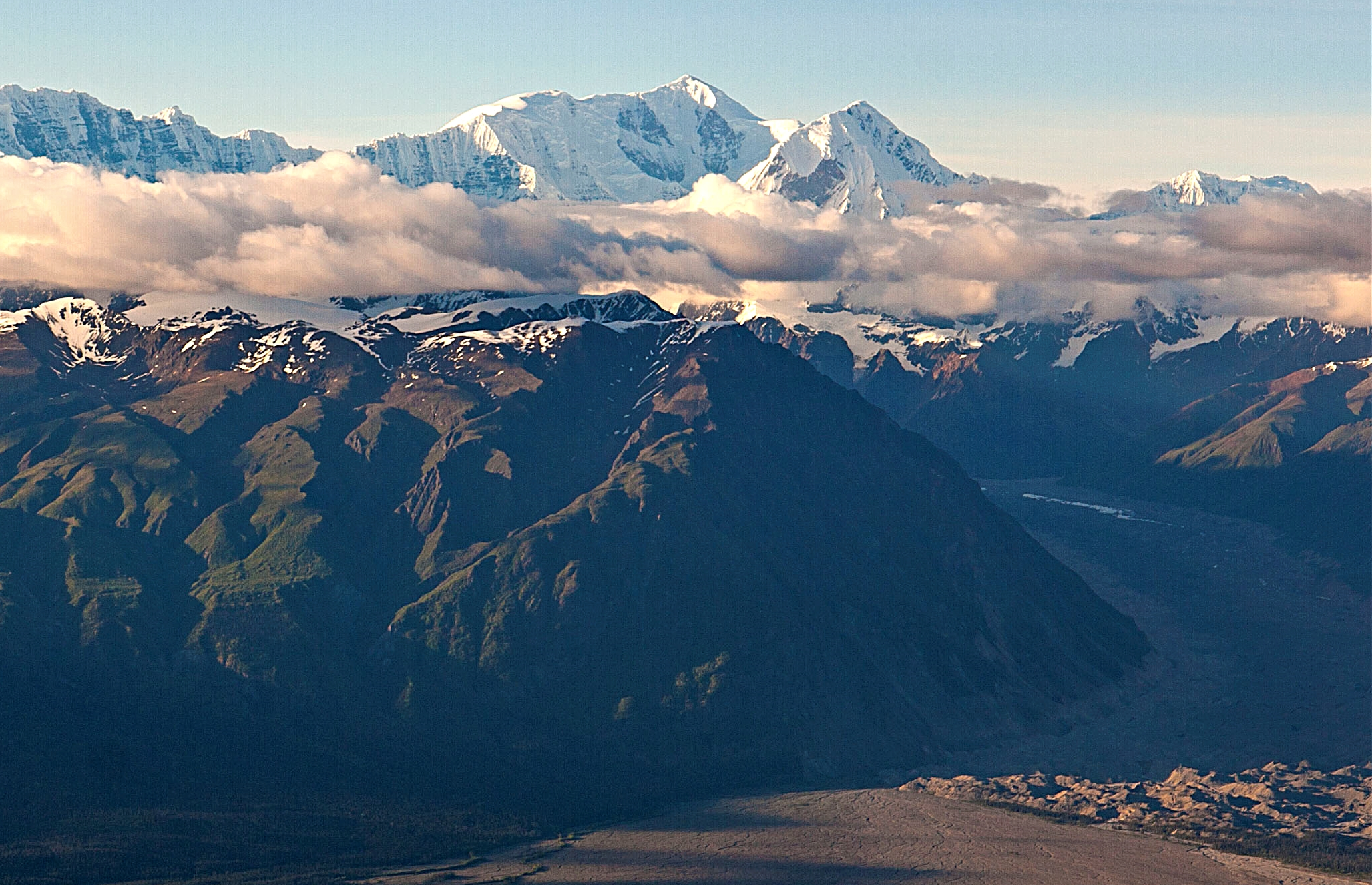
3. Mount Bona in the Copper River Census Area, Alaska

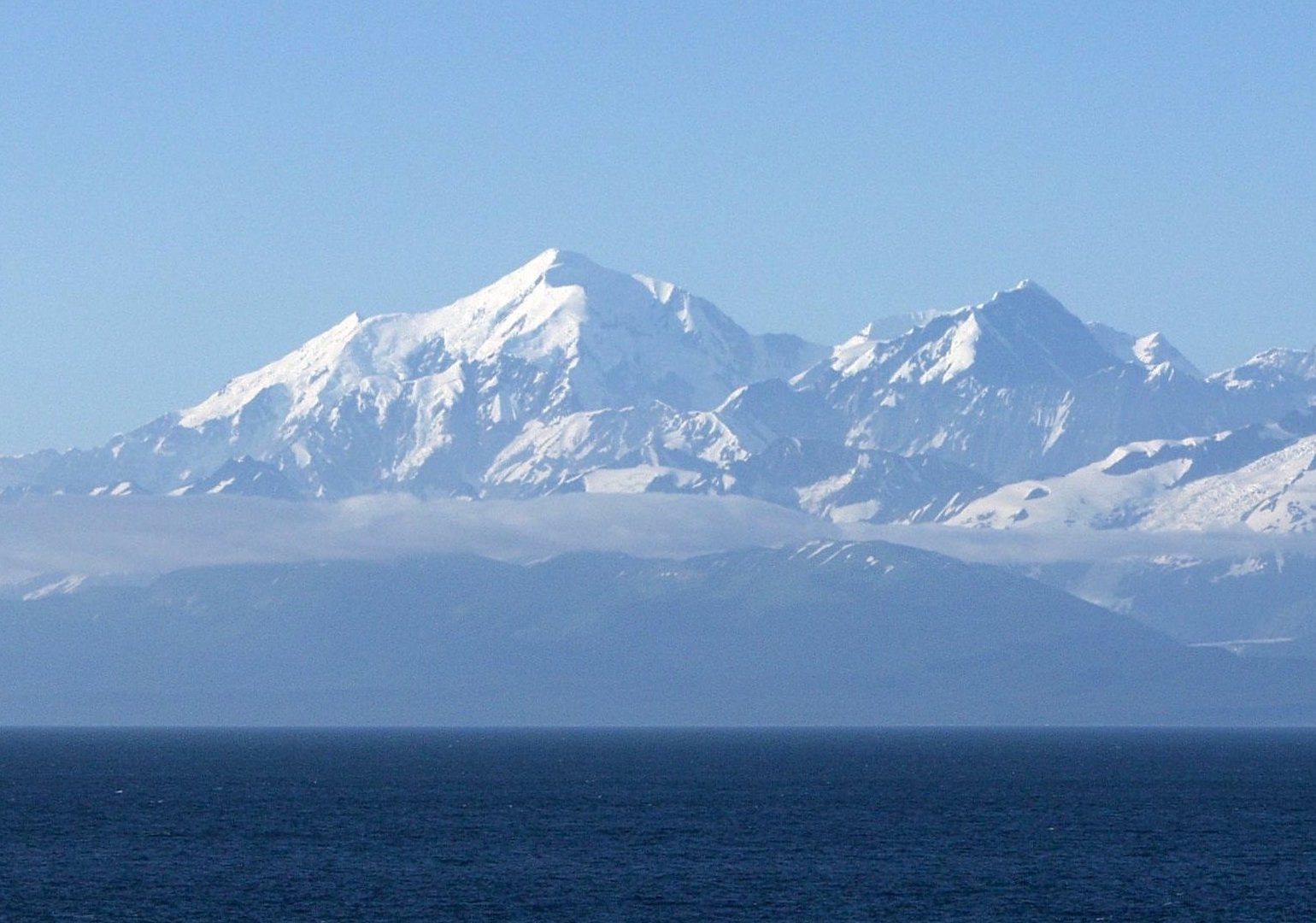
4. Mount Fairweather in the Hoonah–Angoon Census Area, Alaska

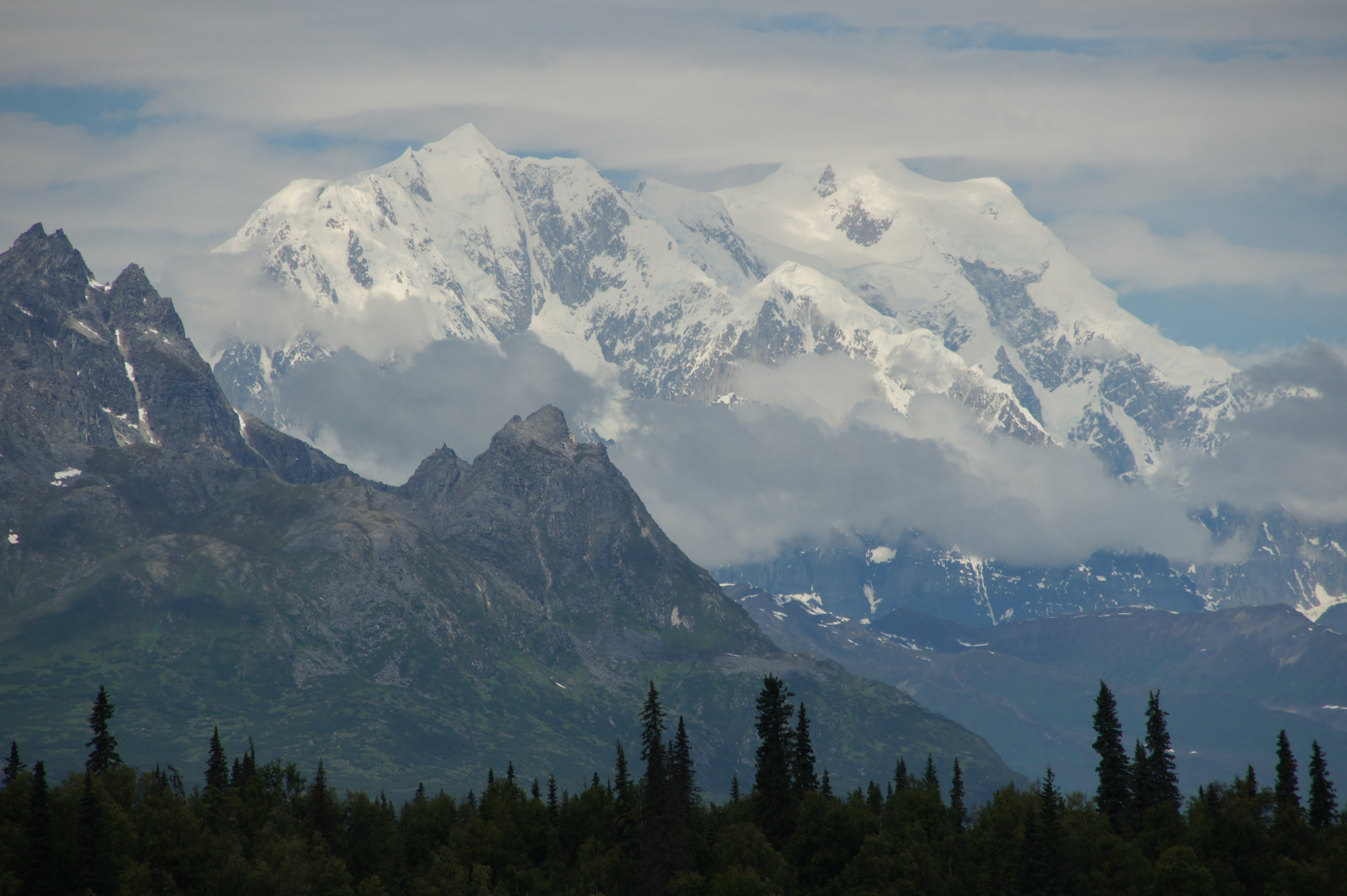
5. Mount Hunter in Matanuska-Susitna Borough, Alaska

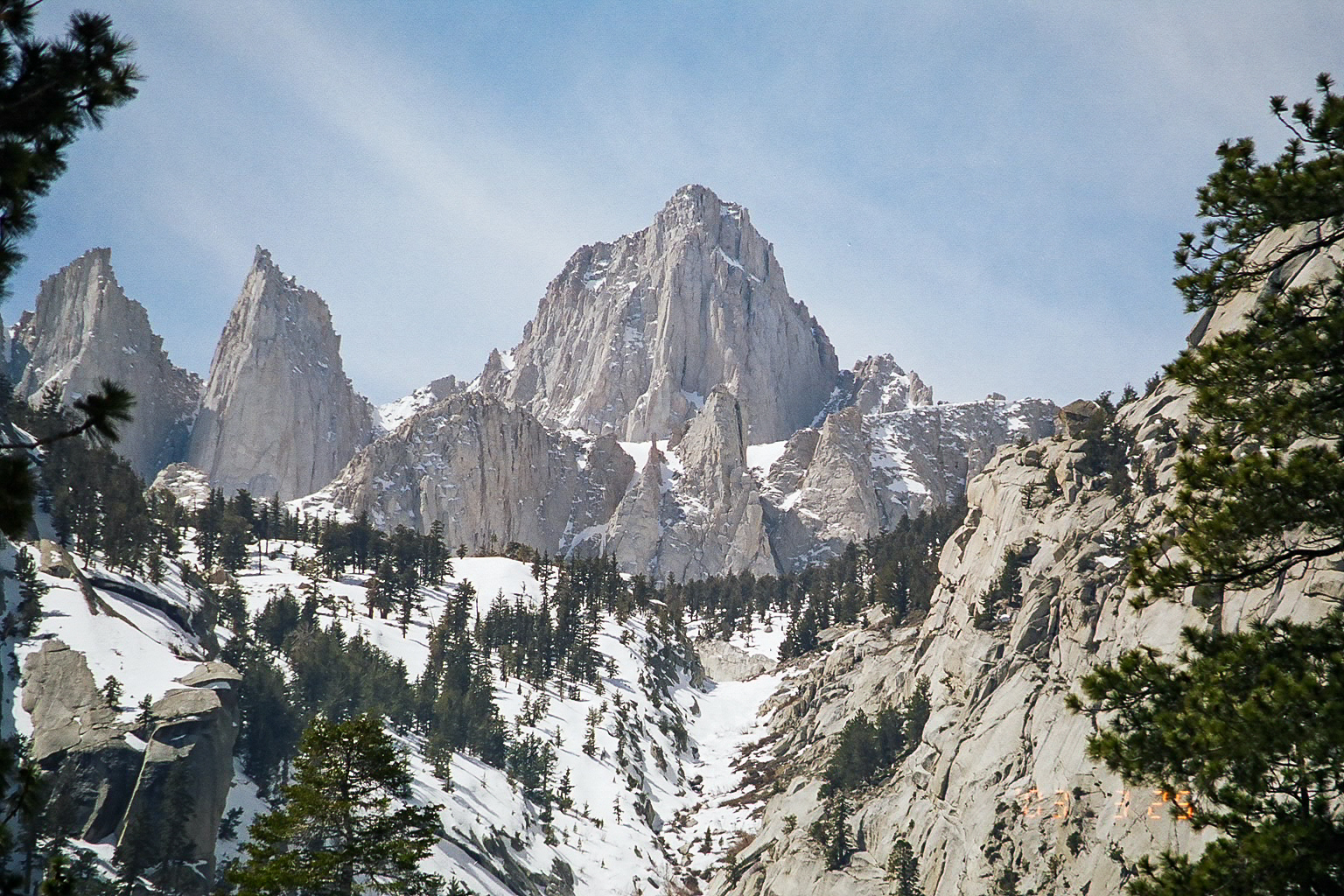
6. Mount Whitney straddling Tulare and Inyo counties, California

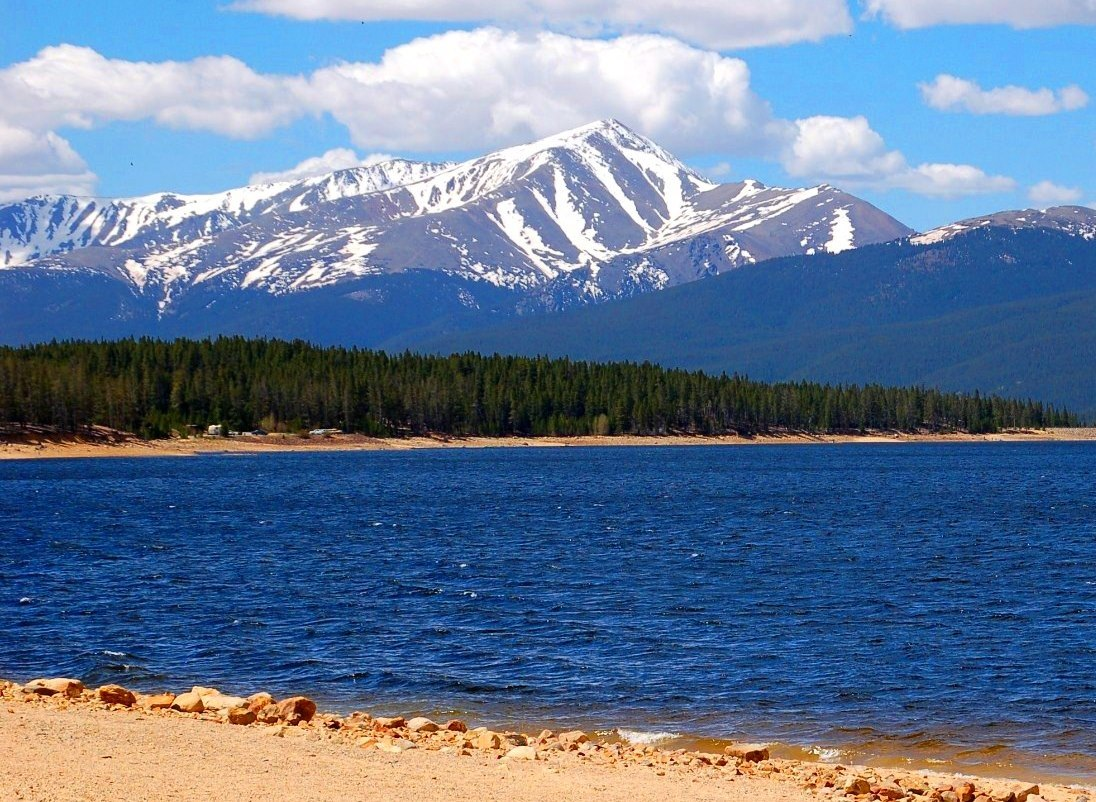
8. Mount Elbert in Lake County, Colorado

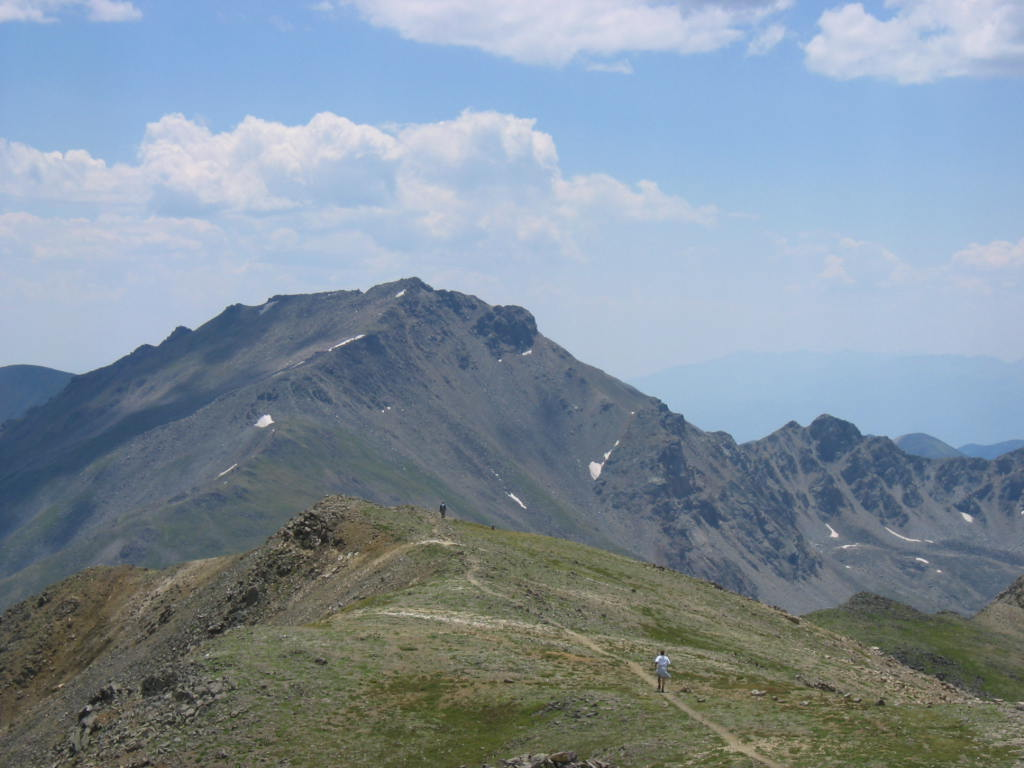
9. Mount Harvard in Chaffee County, Colorado

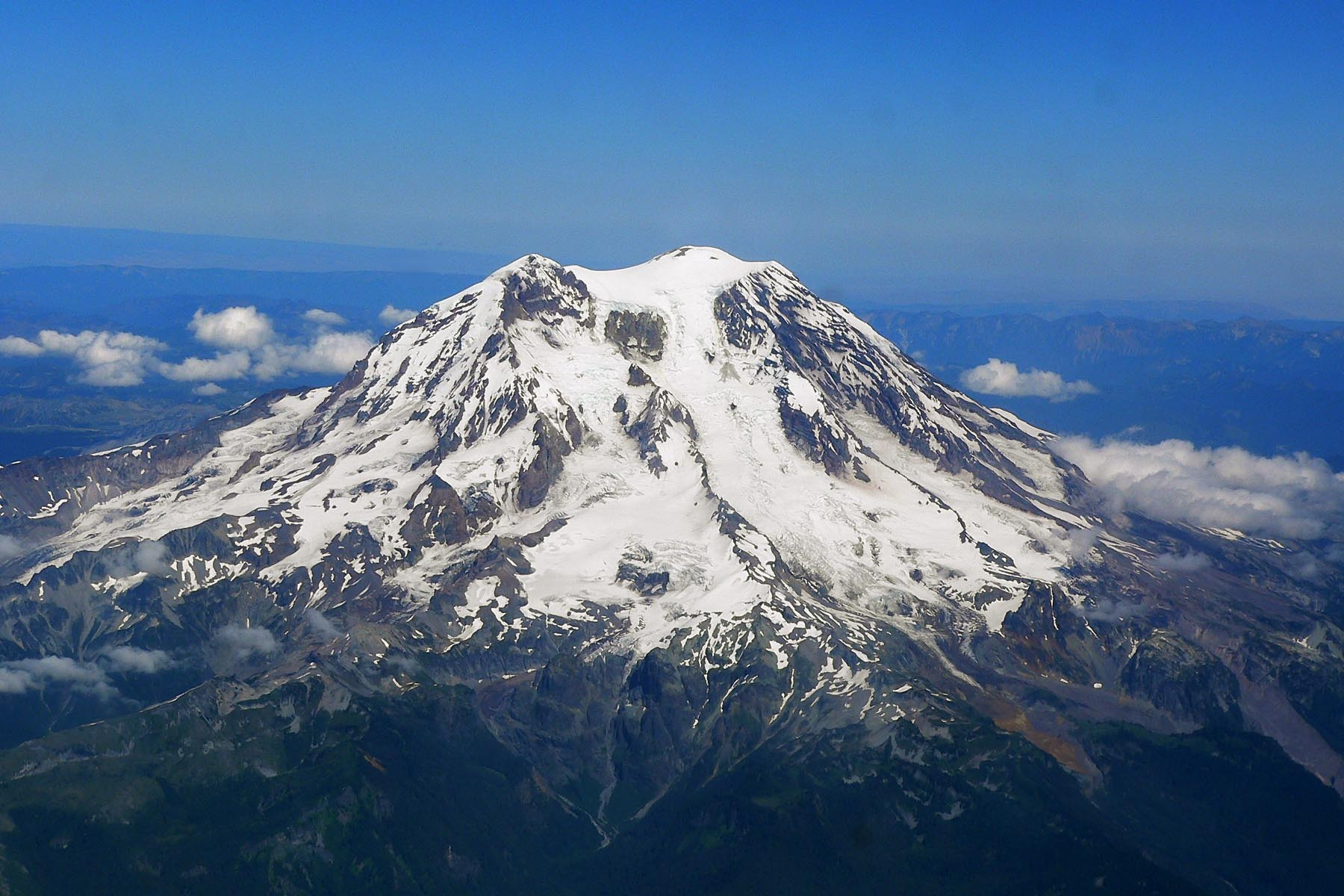
10. Mount Rainier in Pierce County, Washington

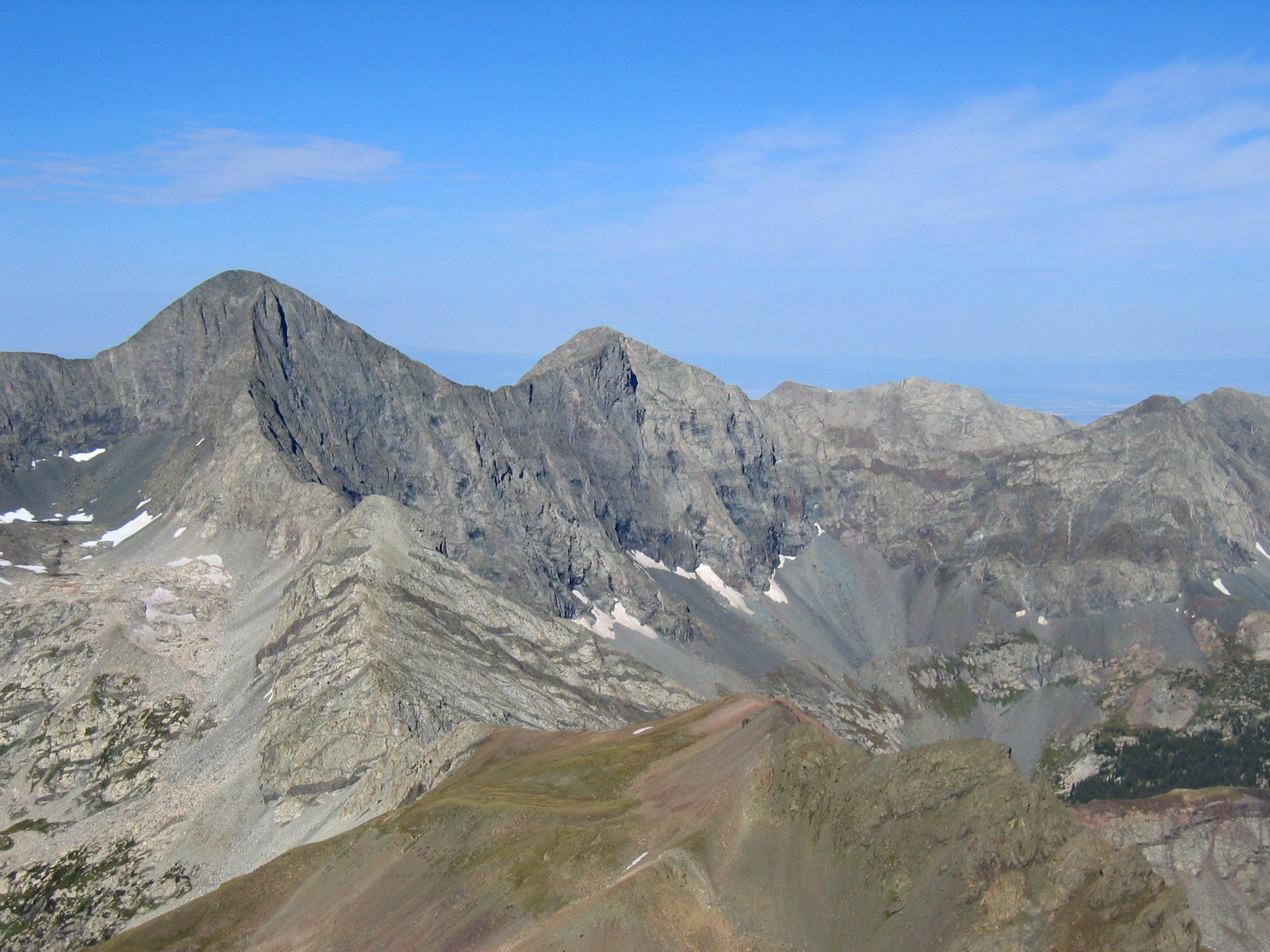
11. Mount Blanca straddling Alamosa and Costilla counties, Colorado

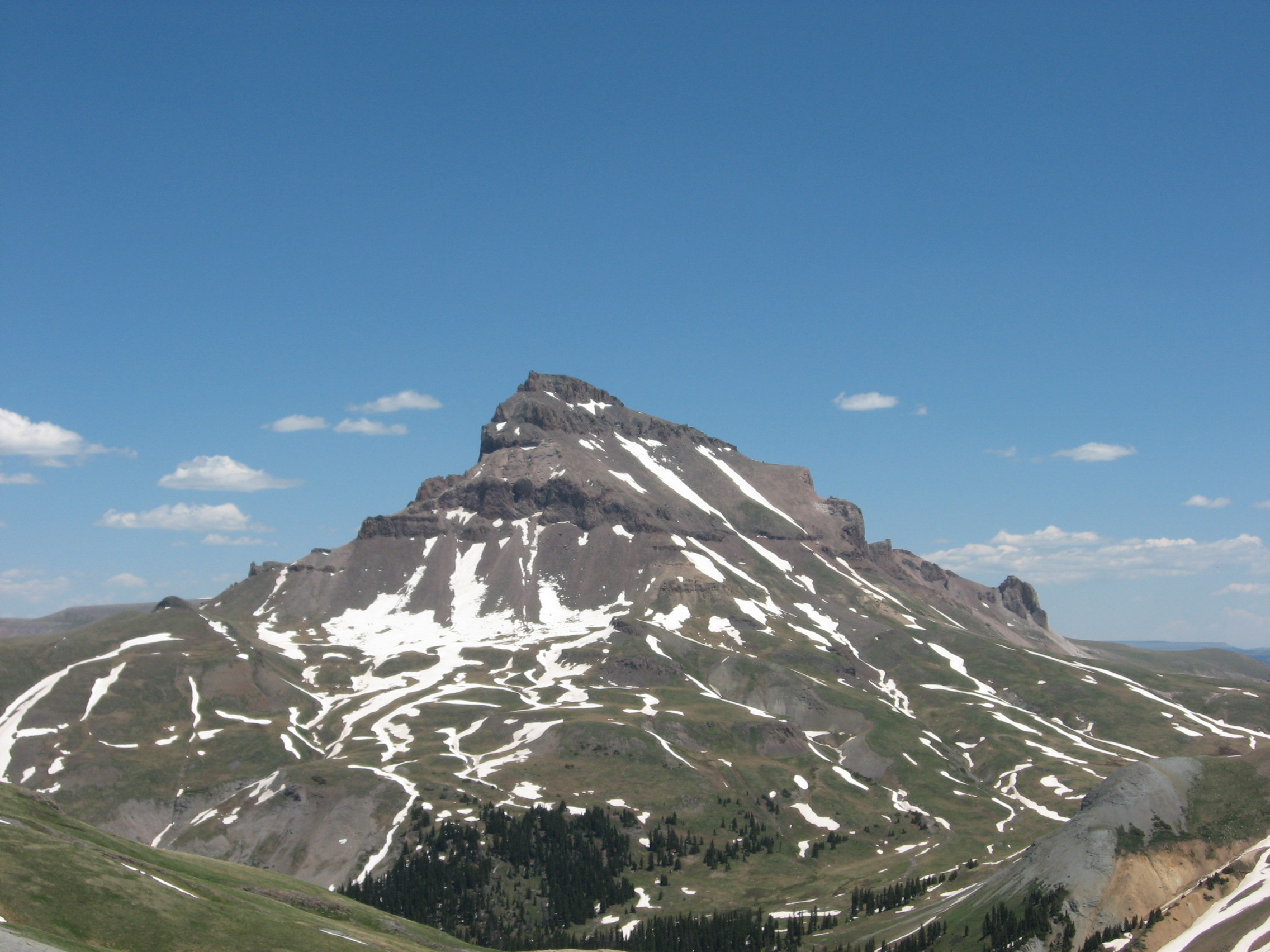
14. Uncompahgre Peak in Hinsdale County, Colorado

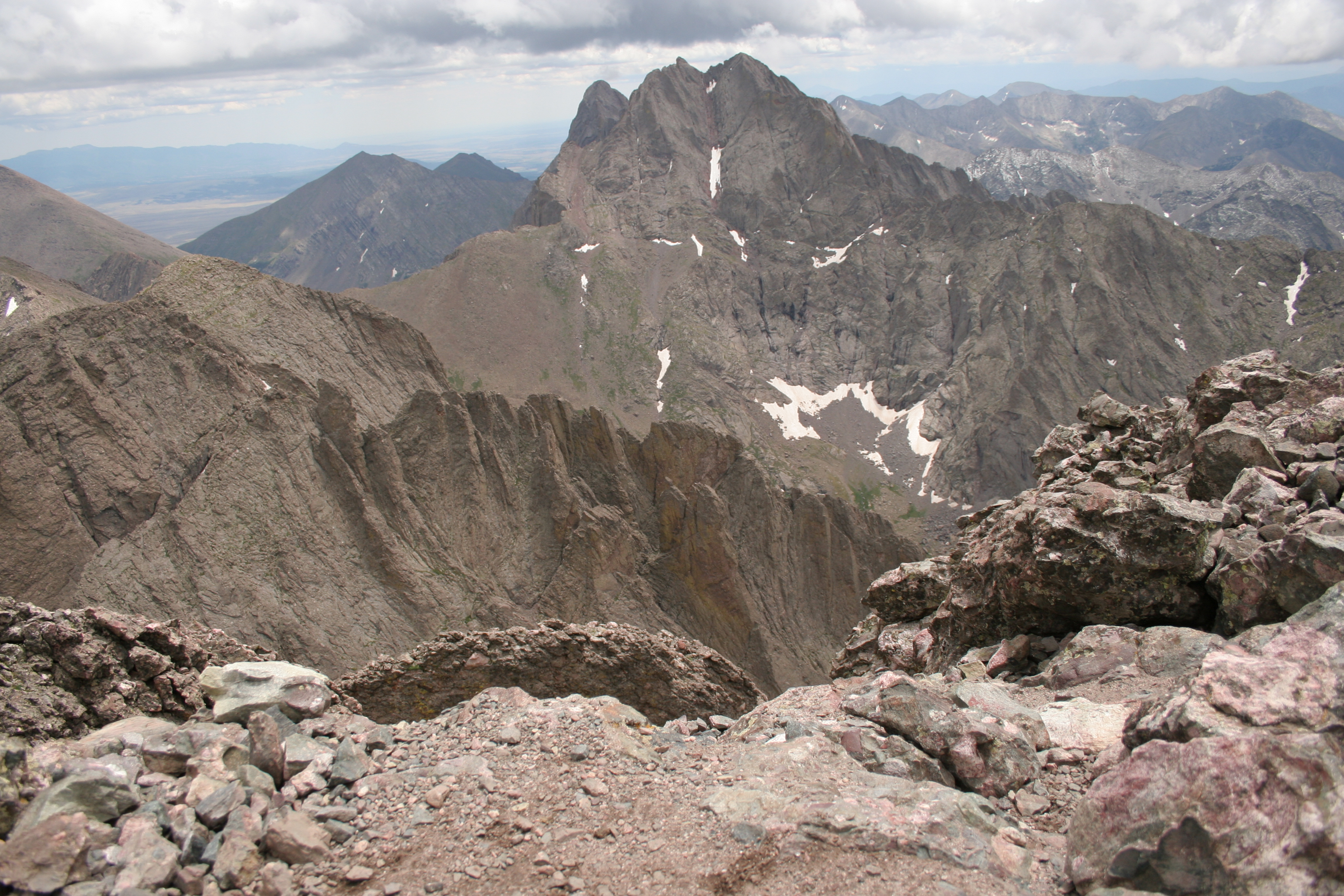
15. Crestone Peak in Saguache County, Colorado

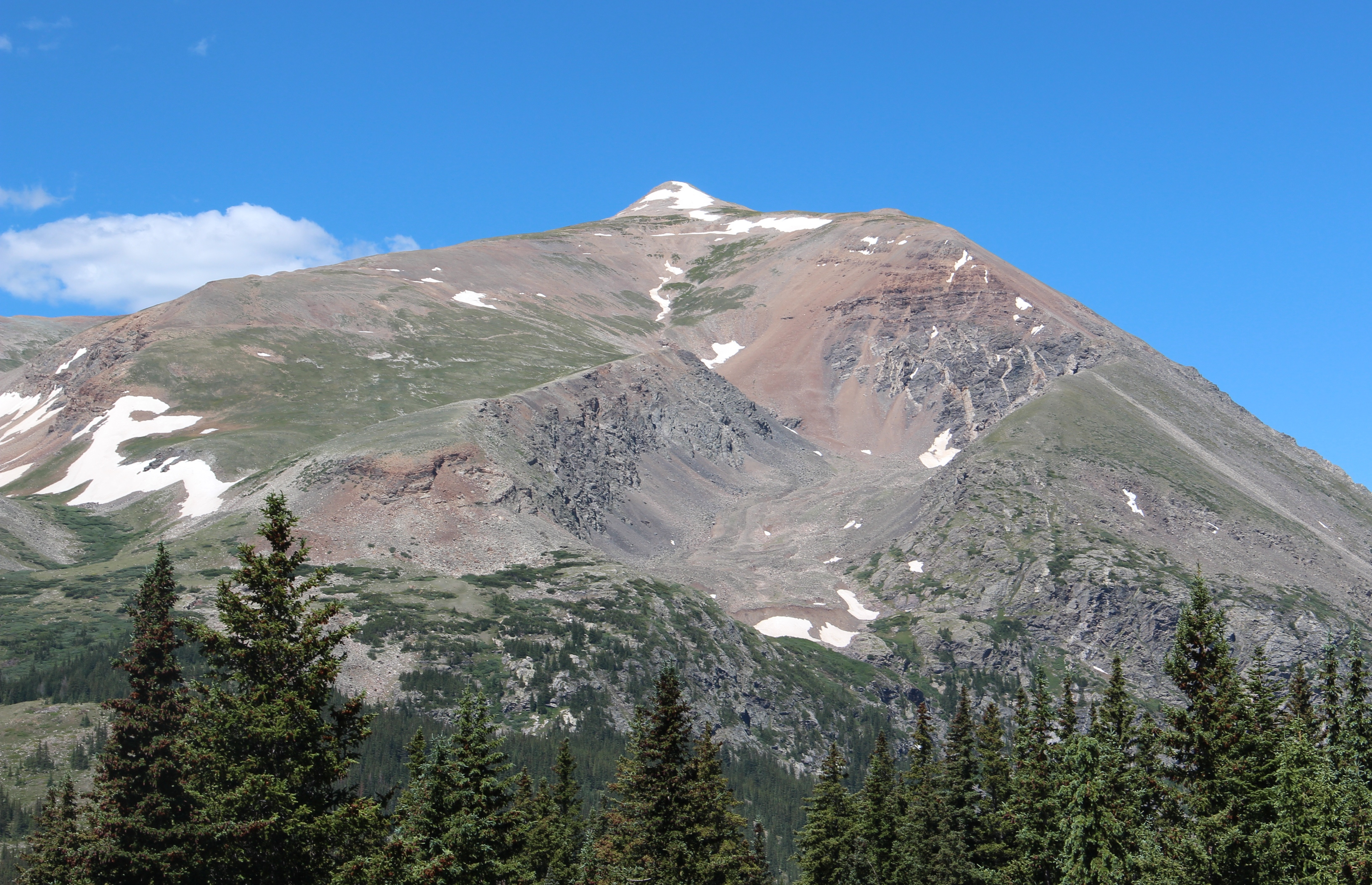
16. Mount Lincoln in Park County, Colorado

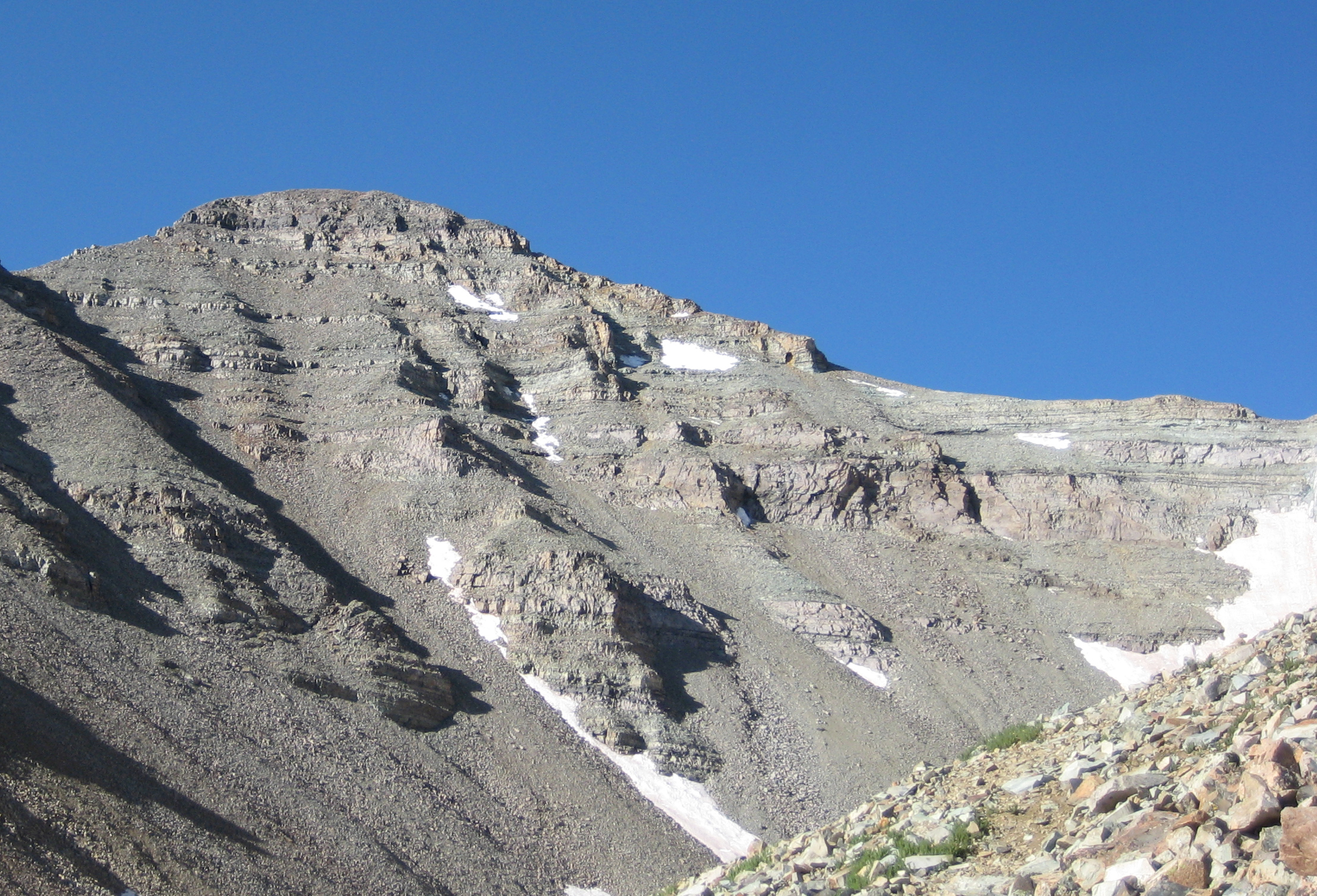
17. Castle Peak staddling Pitkin and Gunnison counties, Colorado

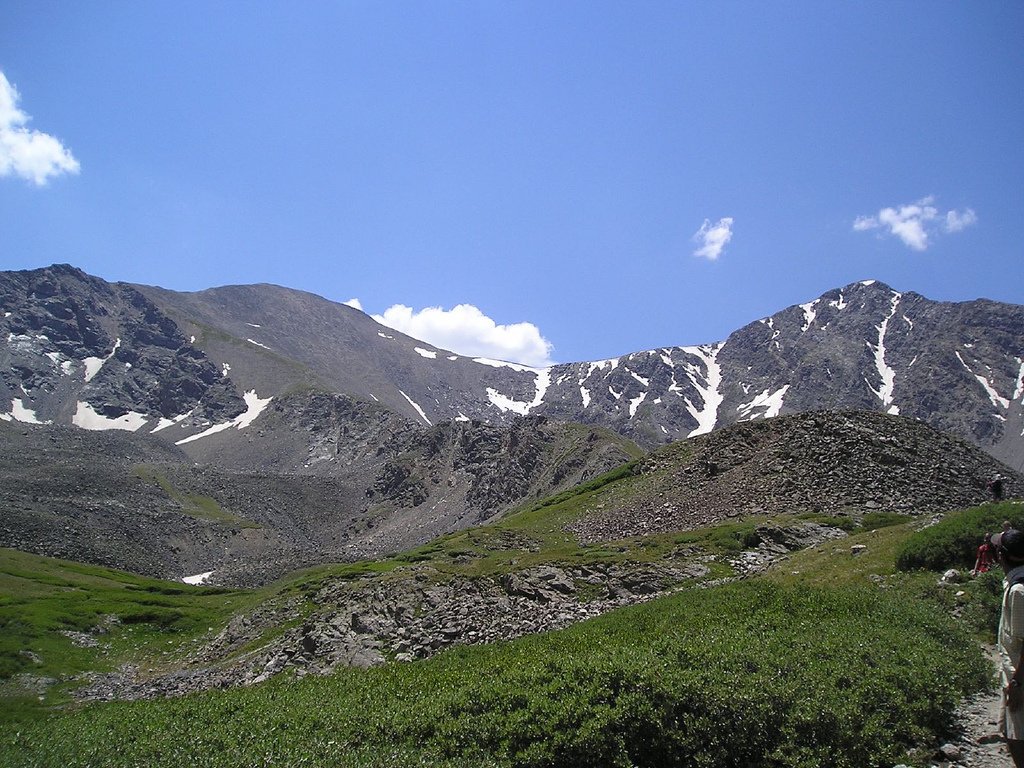
19. Grays Peak straddling Summit and Clear Creek counties, Colorado

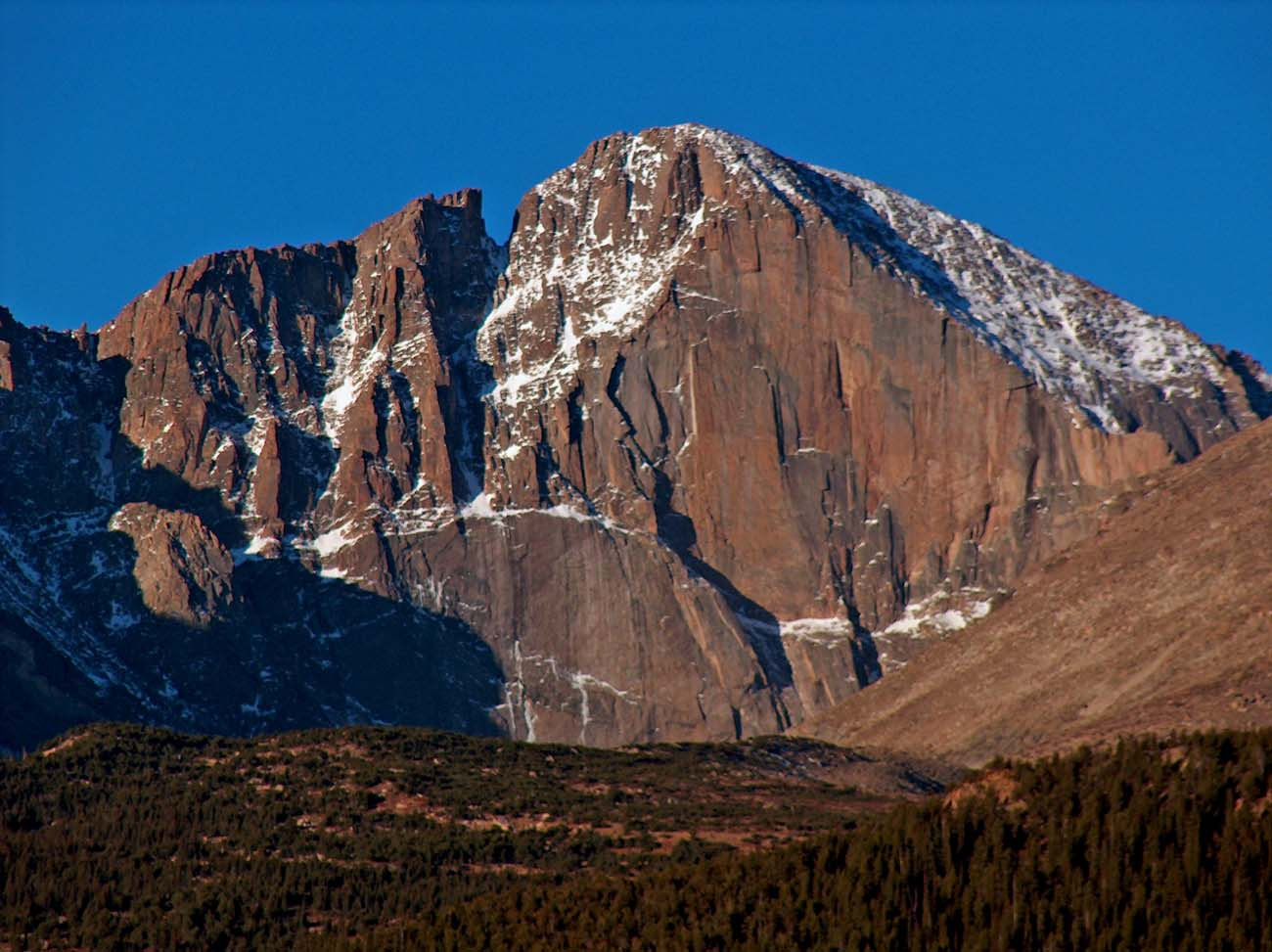
22. Longs Peak in Boulder County, Colorado

== See also ==
- Lists of highest points
  - List of highest points in California by county
  - List of Colorado county high points
  - List of highest points in Oregon by county
  - List of highest points in Nevada by county
  - List of highest points in Washington by county
- List of mountain peaks of the United States
