= Pettingell Peak =

Mountain summit in the Front Range of Colorado

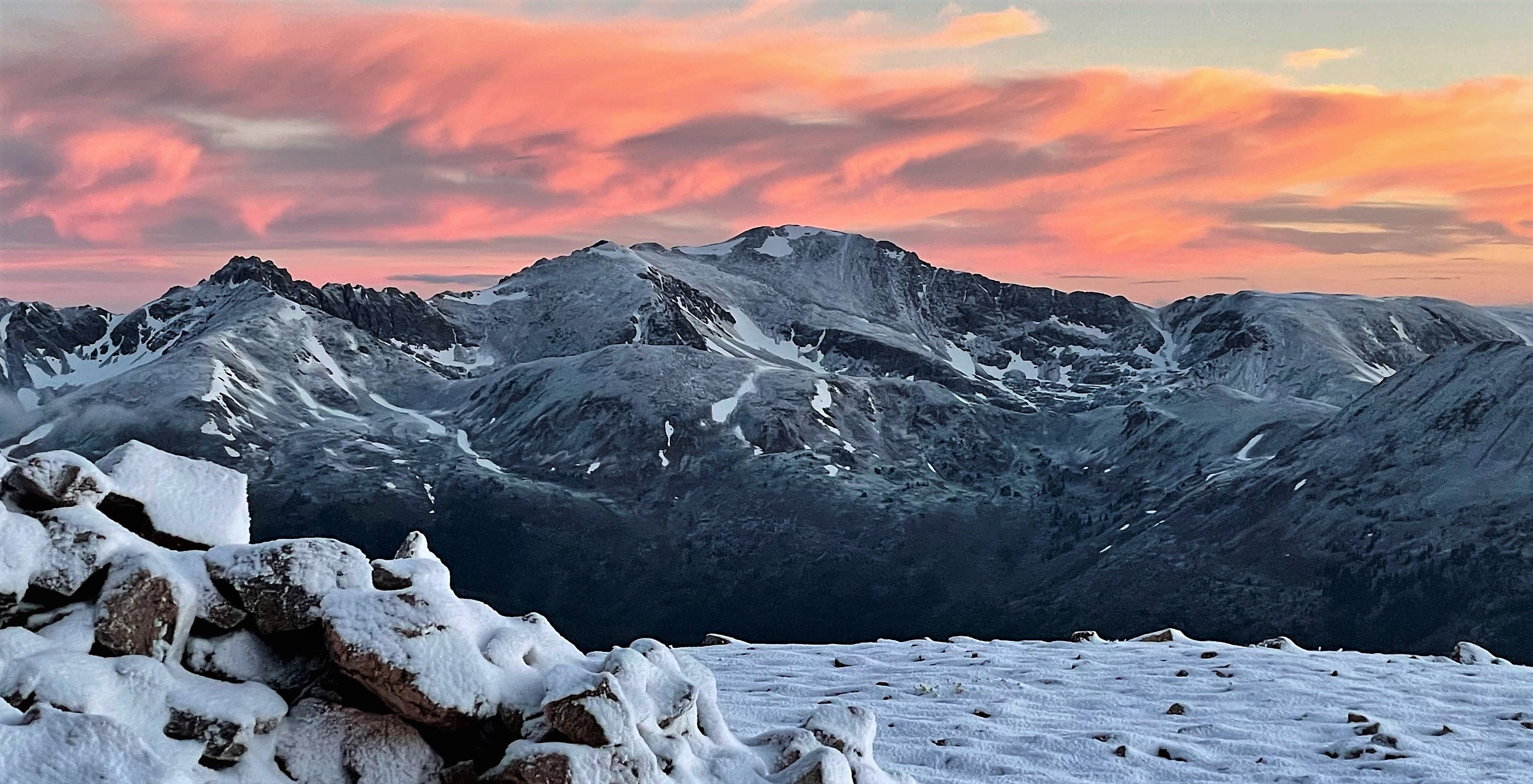
- Southeast aspect, centered at top

Highest point
- Elevation: 13,559 ft (4,133 m); NAVD88
- Prominence: 1,563 ft (476 m)
- Isolation: 4.39 mi (7.07 km) to Mount Parnassus
- Listing: U.S. county high points 41st; Colorado county high points 25th
- Coordinates: 39.7286355°N 105.9046172°W

Geography
- Location within Colorado
- Location: Continental Divide, High point of Grand County
- Country: United States
- State: Colorado
- Counties: Clear Creek County and Grand County
- National Forests: Arapaho National Forest and Roosevelt National Forest
- Parent range: Front Range of the Southern Rocky Mountains
- Topo map(s): USGS 7.5' topographic map Loveland Pass, Colorado

Pettingell Peak is a 13,559-foot (4,133 m) mountain summit on the Continental Divide in the Front Range of the US State of Colorado. Pettingell Peak straddles the Divide between Roosevelt National Forest in Clear Creek County and Arapaho National Forest in Grand County. Pettingell Peak is the highest point in Grand County, Colorado. The peak is located 8.3 miles (13.4 km) southwest of Berthoud Pass.

== Mountain ==
Pettingell Peak is a popular hiking and skiing destination due to its proximity to the Denver Metropolitan Area. The mountain was named after Jake N. Pettingell, a law student who moved to Grand County in 1880 and served as a county judge for 18 years.

== Climate ==
Climate data for Pettingell Peak 39.7247 N, 105.9098 W, Elevation: 13,058 ft (3,980 m) (1991–2020 normals)
| Month | Jan | Feb | Mar | Apr | May | Jun | Jul | Aug | Sep | Oct | Nov | Dec | Year |
|---|---|---|---|---|---|---|---|---|---|---|---|---|---|
| Mean daily maximum °F (°C) | 19.9 (−6.7) | 19.5 (−6.9) | 26.8 (−2.9) | 34.0 (1.1) | 42.4 (5.8) | 52.8 (11.6) | 59.0 (15.0) | 56.6 (13.7) | 50.2 (10.1) | 38.8 (3.8) | 26.9 (−2.8) | 20.1 (−6.6) | 37.3 (2.9) |
| Daily mean °F (°C) | 10.3 (−12.1) | 9.8 (−12.3) | 15.7 (−9.1) | 21.7 (−5.7) | 30.4 (−0.9) | 40.4 (4.7) | 46.6 (8.1) | 44.8 (7.1) | 38.5 (3.6) | 28.0 (−2.2) | 17.6 (−8.0) | 10.6 (−11.9) | 26.2 (−3.2) |
| Mean daily minimum °F (°C) | 0.7 (−17.4) | 0.0 (−17.8) | 4.6 (−15.2) | 9.4 (−12.6) | 18.4 (−7.6) | 28.0 (−2.2) | 34.2 (1.2) | 33.0 (0.6) | 26.8 (−2.9) | 17.2 (−8.2) | 8.2 (−13.2) | 1.1 (−17.2) | 15.1 (−9.4) |
| Average precipitation inches (mm) | 3.63 (92) | 3.49 (89) | 3.67 (93) | 4.55 (116) | 3.59 (91) | 1.72 (44) | 2.54 (65) | 2.53 (64) | 2.25 (57) | 2.64 (67) | 3.13 (80) | 3.29 (84) | 37.03 (942) |
Source: PRISM Climate Group

== See also ==
- Colorado
  - Geography of Colorado
    - List of mountain peaks of Colorado
      - Category:Mountains of Colorado
