= Gilbert Peak (Utah) =

Mountain in the American state of Utah

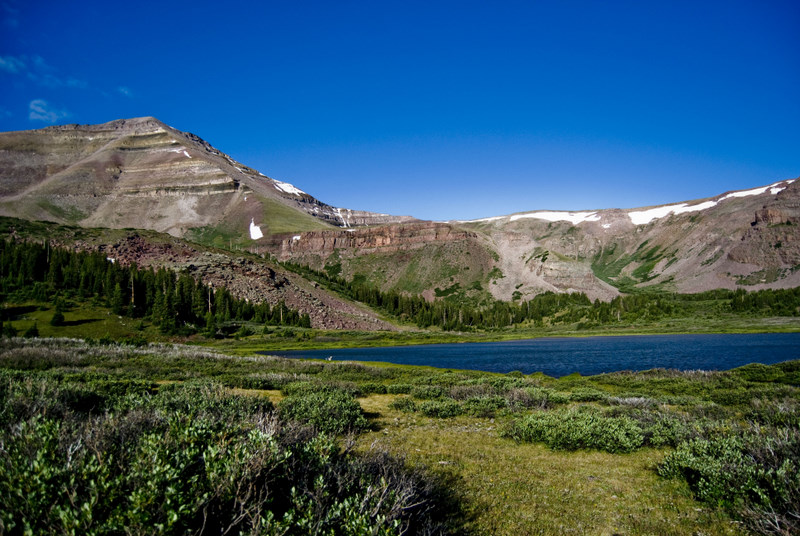
- Gilbert Peak viewed from the northeast in the West Fork Beaver Creek drainage.

Highest point
- Elevation: 13,448 ft (4,099 m) NAVD 88
- Prominence: 1,554 ft (474 m)
- Coordinates: 40°49′25″N 110°22′40″W

Geography
- Location within Utah
- Location: Duchesne County and Summit County, Utah, U.S.
- Parent range: Uinta Mountains
- Topo map: USGS Kings Peak

Gilbert Peak is the third highest peak in the U.S. state of Utah, with an elevation of 13,448 feet (4,099 m). It lies on the spine of the central Uinta Mountains, on the border between Uinta-Wasatch-Cache National Forest and Ashley National Forest in northeastern Utah, and on the border between Summit County and Duchesne County. It is the highpoint of Summit County, and lies within the boundaries of the High Uintas Wilderness.
