= Sherwin Range =

Mountain range in California, United States

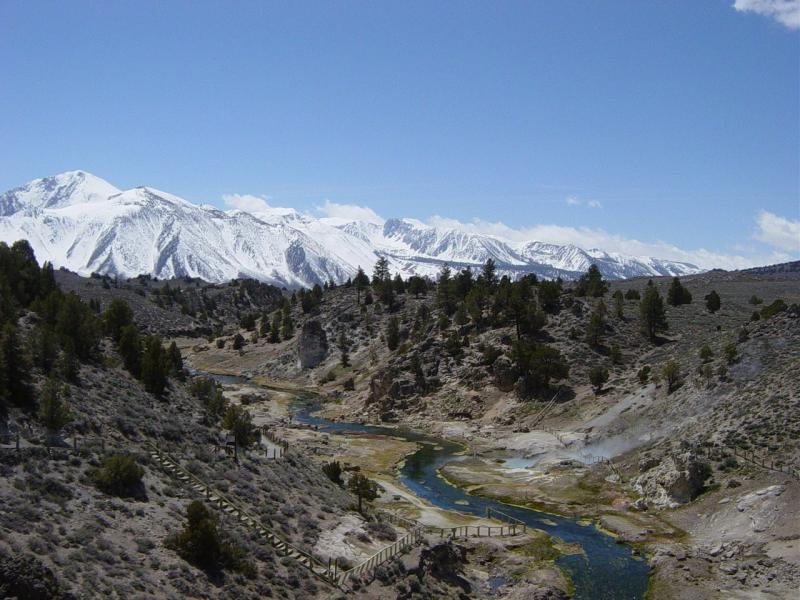
Snow-covered Sherwin Range, seen from the Long Valley Caldera.

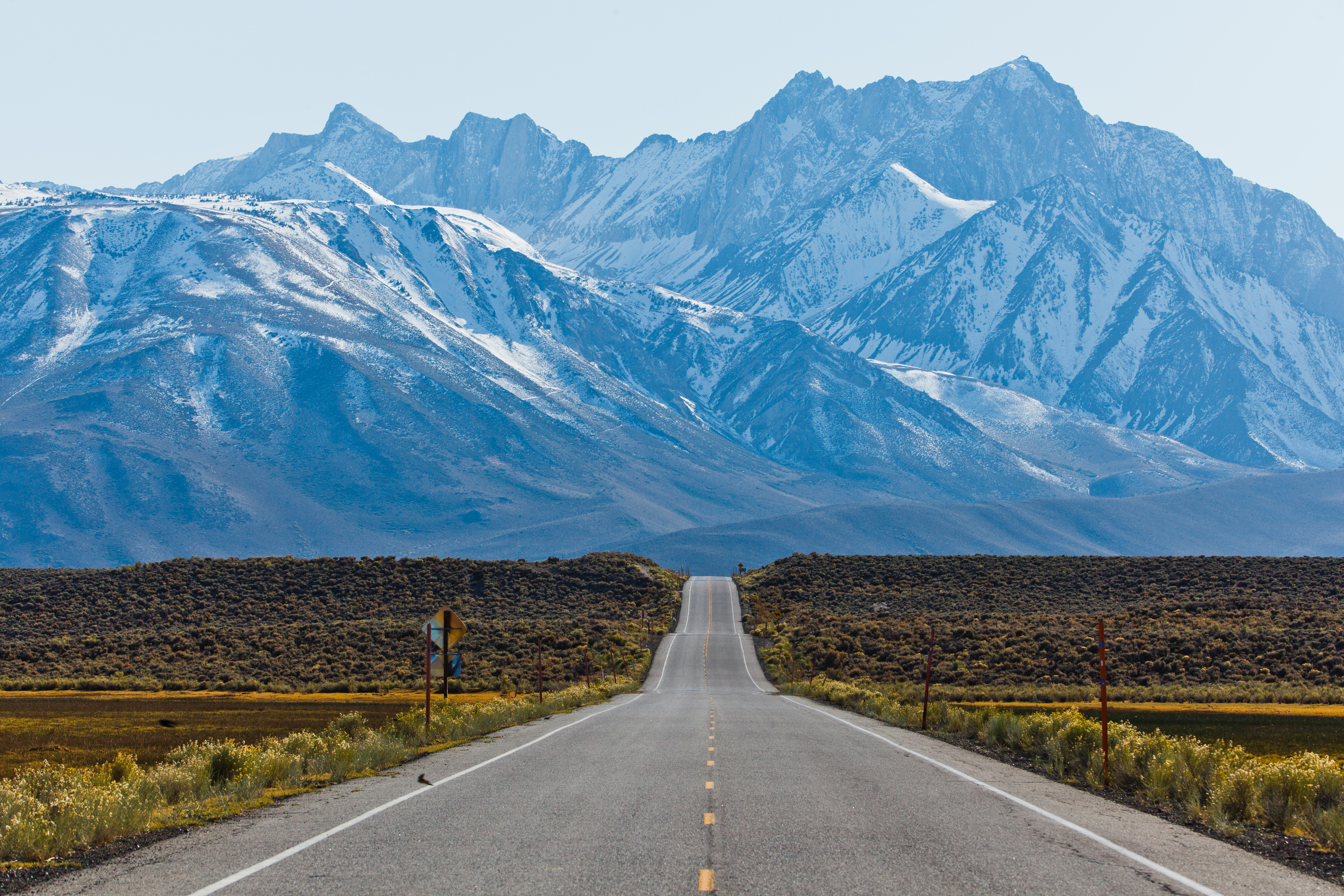
McGee Mountain and Mount Morrison, seen from Benton Crossing in the Long Valley Caldera.

The Sherwin Range is a mountain range that is a sub-range of the Sierra Nevada system, in Mono County, eastern California. The range is also known locally as The Sherwins.

== Geography ==
The Sherwin Range is immediately to the south of the Long Valley Caldera, and stretches from just south of the town of Mammoth Lakes. to the Wheeler Crest of the Sierra Nevada. The range lies to the south of the Long Valley Caldera.

The range is named after Jim Sherwin, a prospector who operated the first toll road across the Sierra. Its eastern terminus was at Mammoth Lakes.

== Recreation ==
The Sherwin Range is within Inyo National Forest. It is well known for hiking opportunities in the summer, and backcountry skiing in the winter.

== Geology ==
The range largely consists of reddish metamorphic rock, which are the roof pendant for the Sierra Nevada. This rock was formed in the Paleozoic Era, and then was subsequently recrystallized and warped by the intrusion of the Sierra Nevada batholith underneath it.

== Landmarks ==
=== Prominent peaks ===
- Bloody Mountain
- Laurel Mountain
- Mount Morrison
- Red Slate Mountain (tallest peak)
- Mount Baldwin
- McGee Mountain
- Mount Morgan
- Mount Huntington

=== Other features ===
- Convict Lake

== See also ==
- List of plants of the Sierra Nevada (U.S.)
- Mountain ranges of Mono County, California
