= Mount Baldwin =

Mount Baldwin may refer to:

- Mount Baldwin (California), a mountain in the Sierra Nevada, US
- Mount Baldwin (Antarctica), a mountain in the Alamein Range, Antarctica
