= Mount Baldwin (California) =

Mountain in the state of California

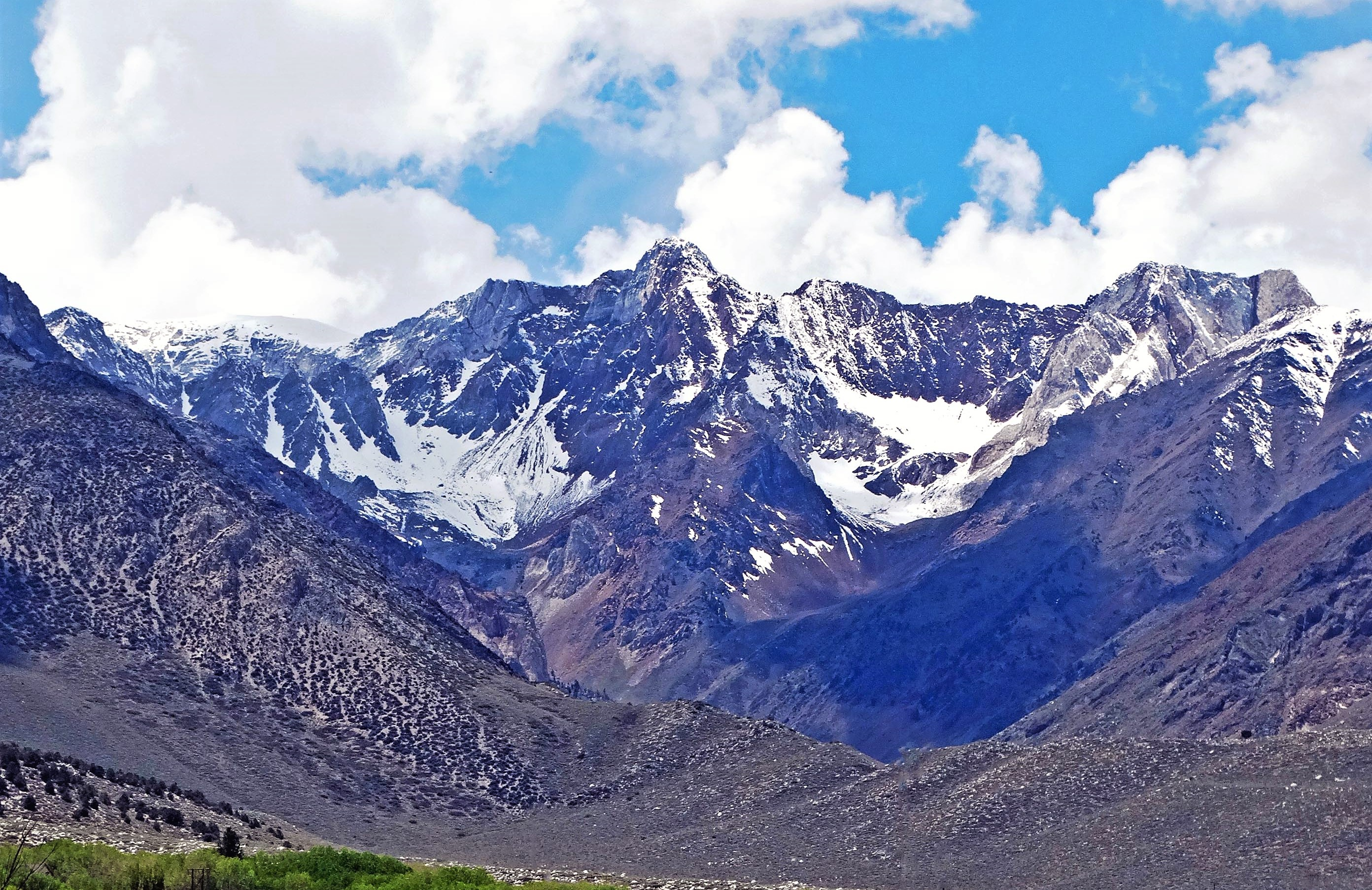
- Northeast aspect

Highest point
- Elevation: 12,614 ft (3,845 m)
- Prominence: 518 ft (158 m)
- Parent peak: Red Slate Mountain (13,163 ft)
- Isolation: 1.97 mi (3.17 km)
- Listing: Sierra Peaks Section
- Coordinates: 37°31′55″N 118°51′05″W

Geography
- Location within California Location within the United States
- Country: United States
- State: California
- County: Mono
- Protected area: John Muir Wilderness
- Parent range: Sierra Nevada
- Topo map: USGS Convict Lake

Geology
- Rock age: Paleozoic
- Rock type: metamorphic rock

Climbing
- First ascent: 1928
- Easiest route: class 2

Mount Baldwin is a 12,614-foot-elevation (3,845-meter) mountain summit located in the Sierra Nevada mountain range in Mono County of northern California, United States. It is situated in the John Muir Wilderness on land managed by Inyo National Forest. It is four miles north of Red and White Mountain, and approximately 10.5 miles (16.9 km) southeast of the community of Mammoth Lakes. The nearest higher neighbor is Red Slate Mountain, 2 miles (3.2 km) to the south-southwest. Baldwin ranks as the 257th highest summit in California. Topographic relief is significant as the east aspect rises 3,775 feet (1,151 meters) above McGee Canyon in 1.5 mile. The first ascent of the summit was made July 2, 1928, by Norman Clyde, who is credited with 130 first ascents, most of which were in the Sierra Nevada.

== Climate ==
Mount Baldwin is located in an alpine climate zone. Most weather fronts originate in the Pacific Ocean, and travel east toward the Sierra Nevada mountains. As fronts approach, they are forced upward by the peaks, causing them to drop their moisture in the form of rain or snowfall onto the range (orographic lift). Precipitation runoff from the mountain drains east to Crowley Lake via McGee Creek, and west into Convict Creek, thence Convict Lake.

== Gallery ==
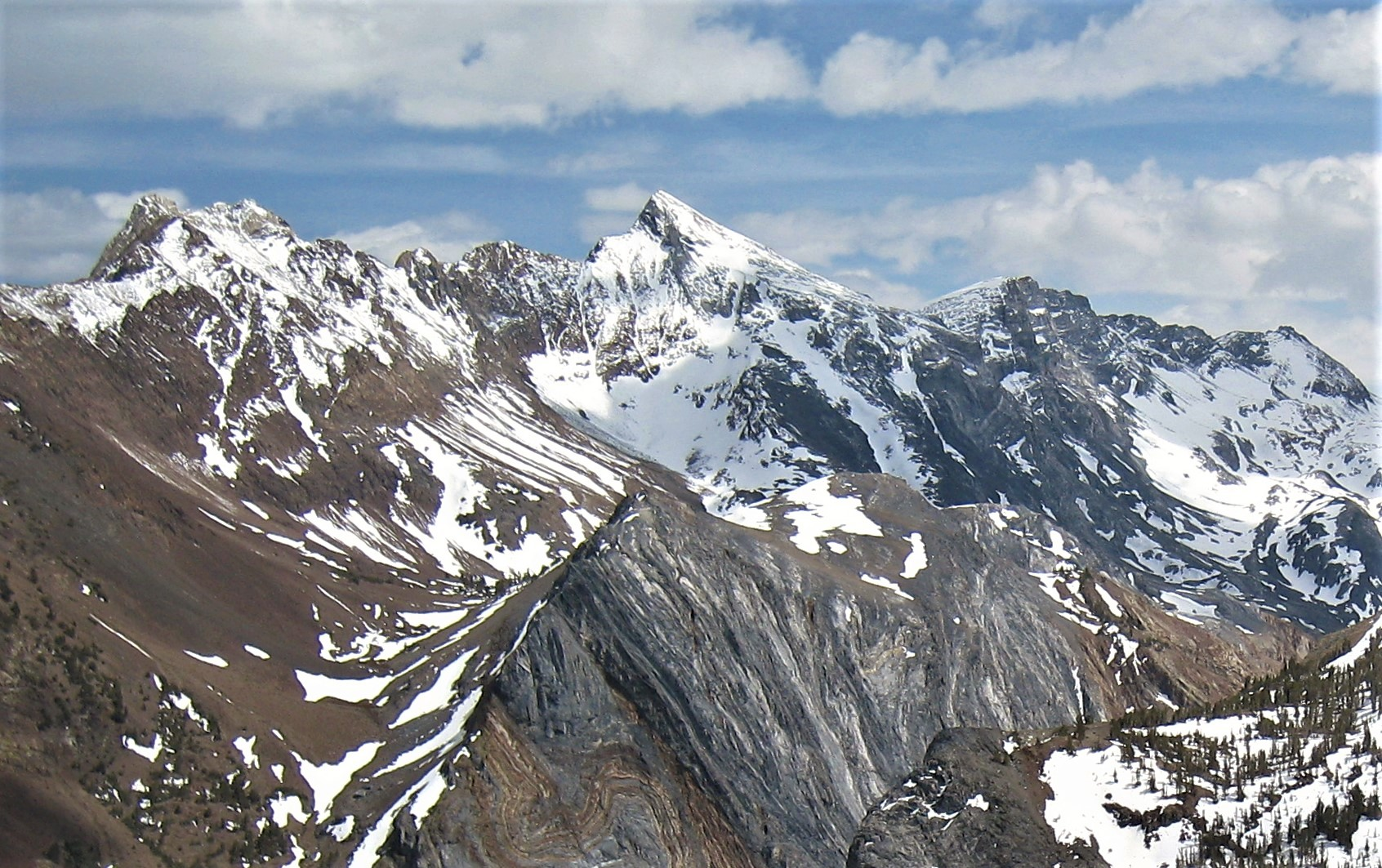
Northwest aspect of Mount Baldwin (center) and White Fang (left)

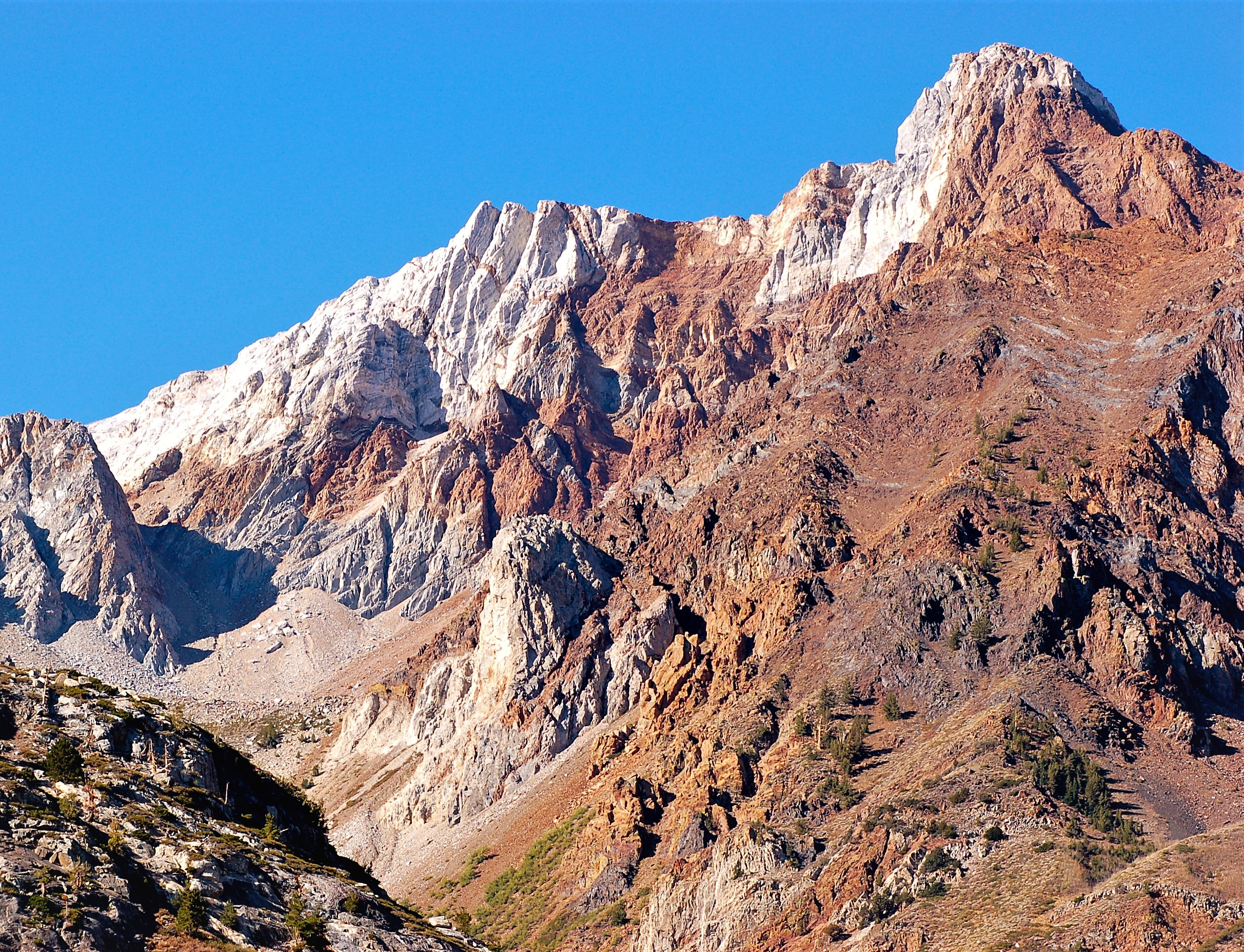

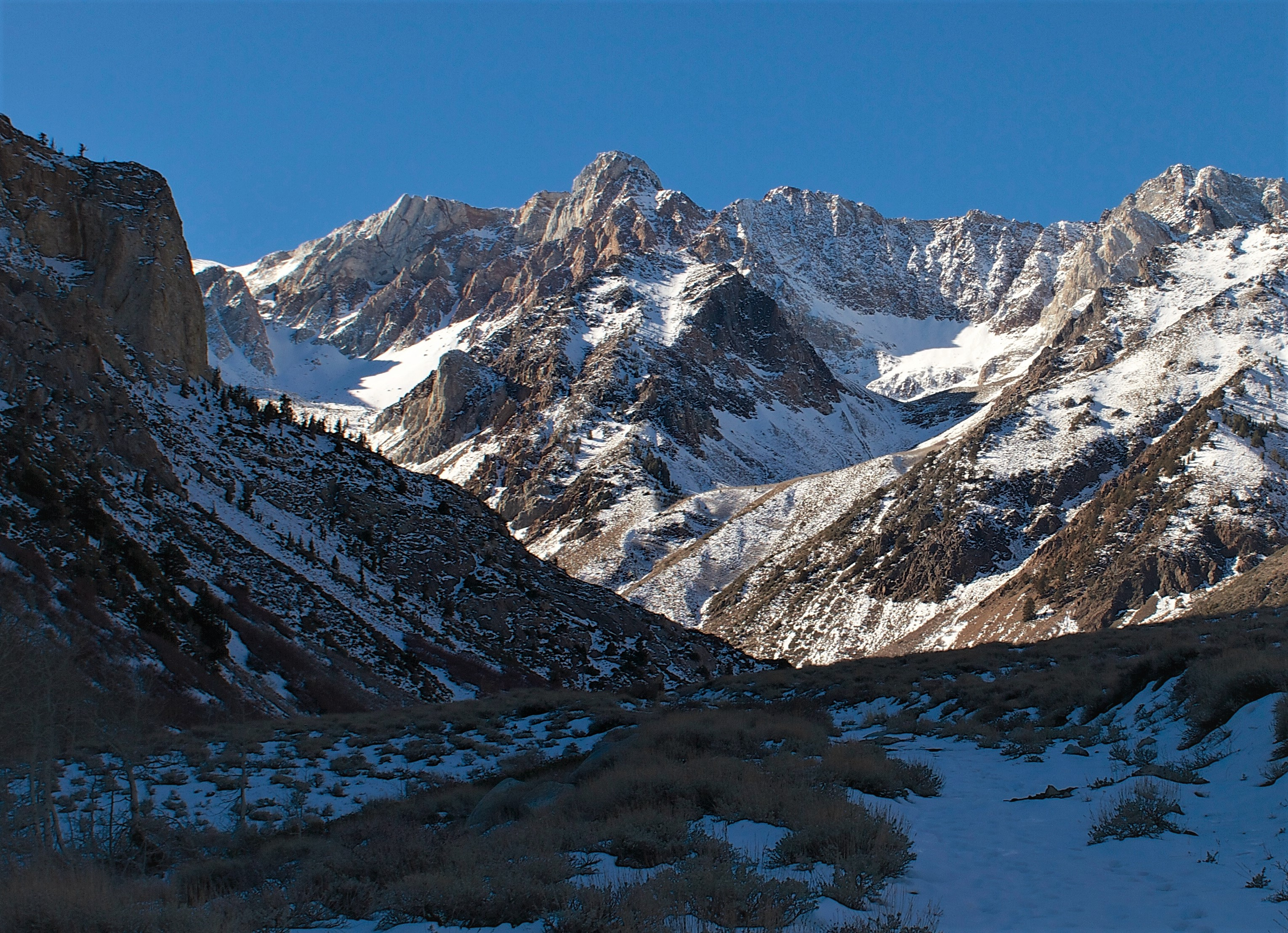

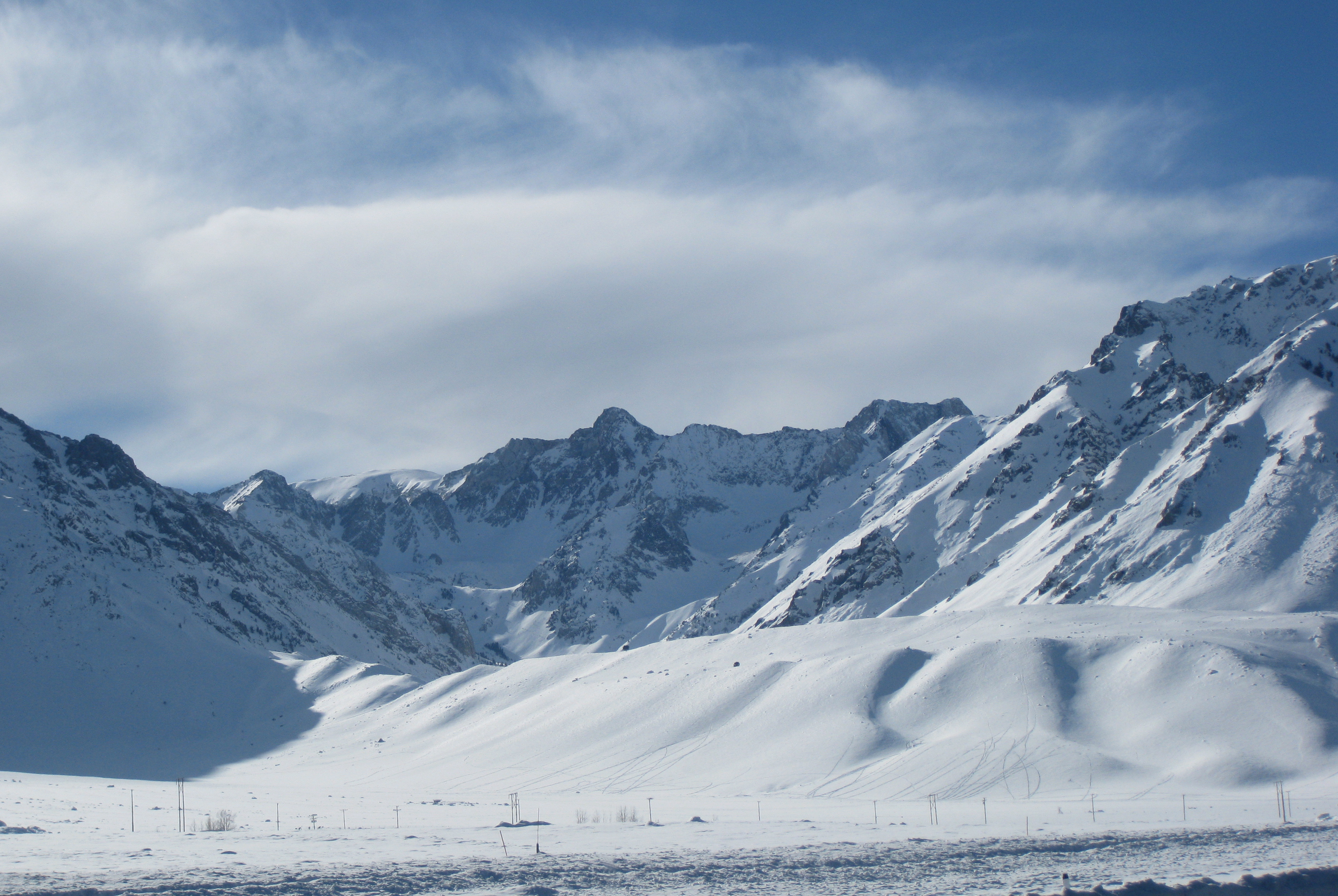

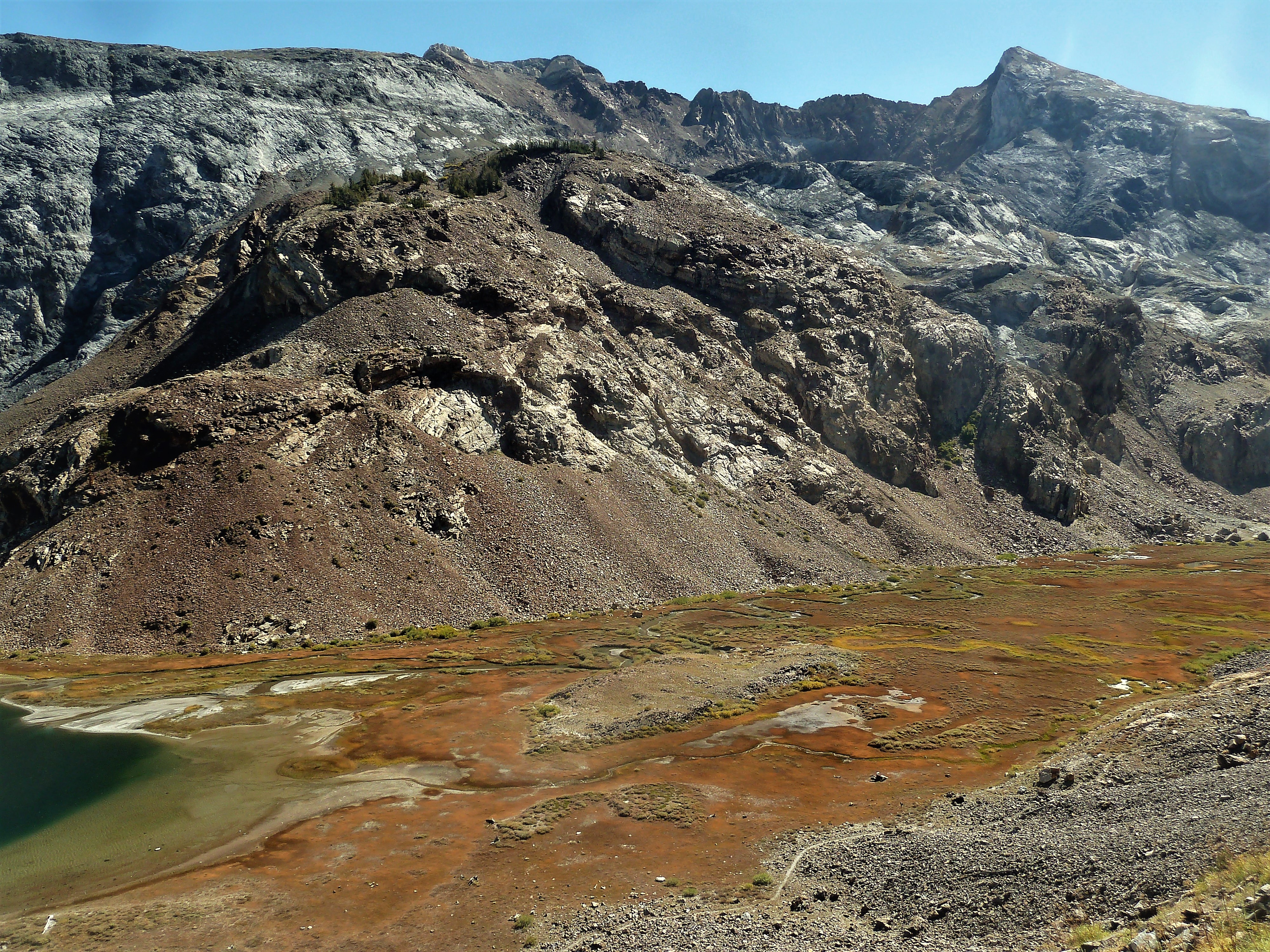
Summit in upper right corner, northwest aspect from Mildred Lake area

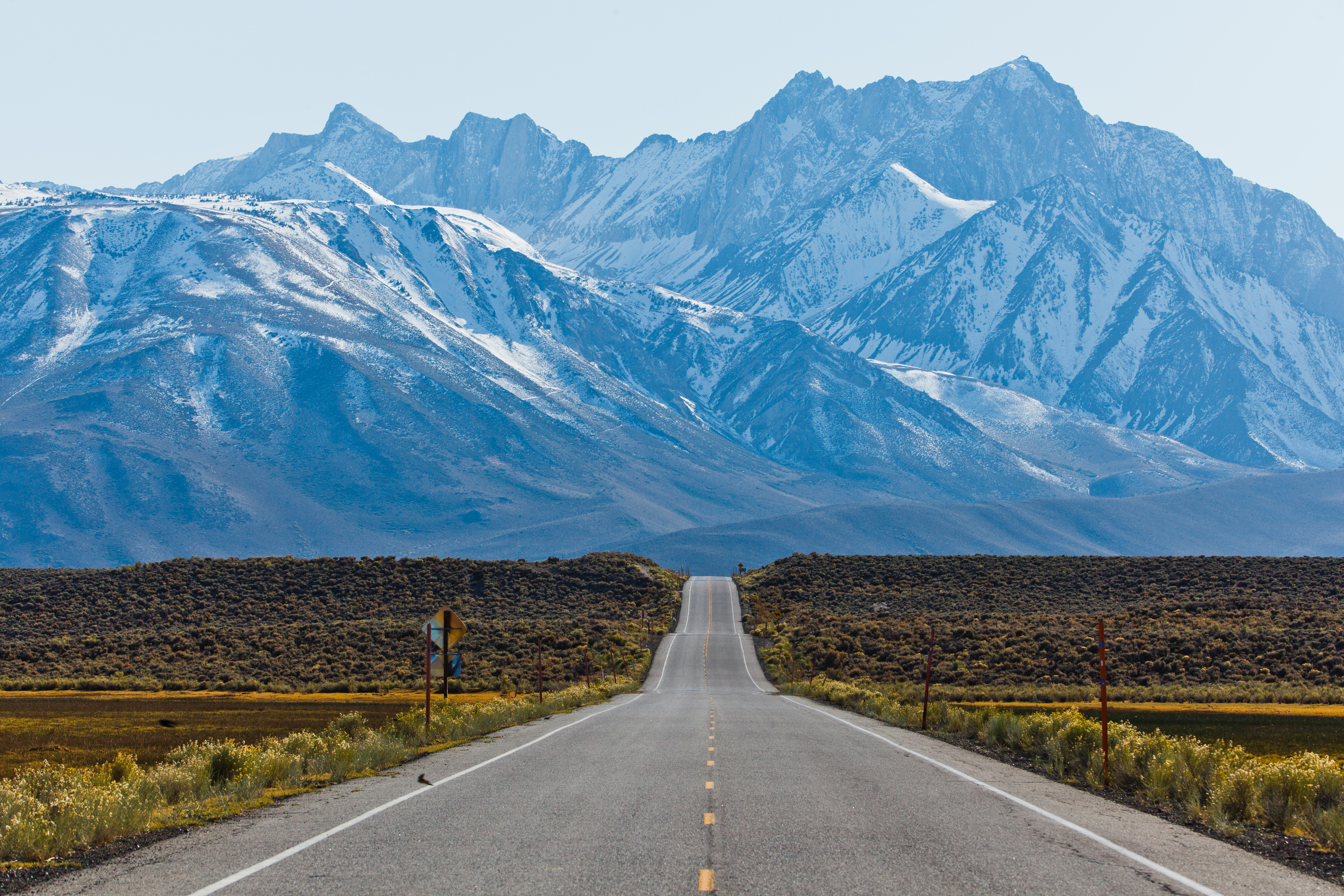
Baldwin (left), Morrison (right) seen from the north on Benton Crossing Road in Long Valley

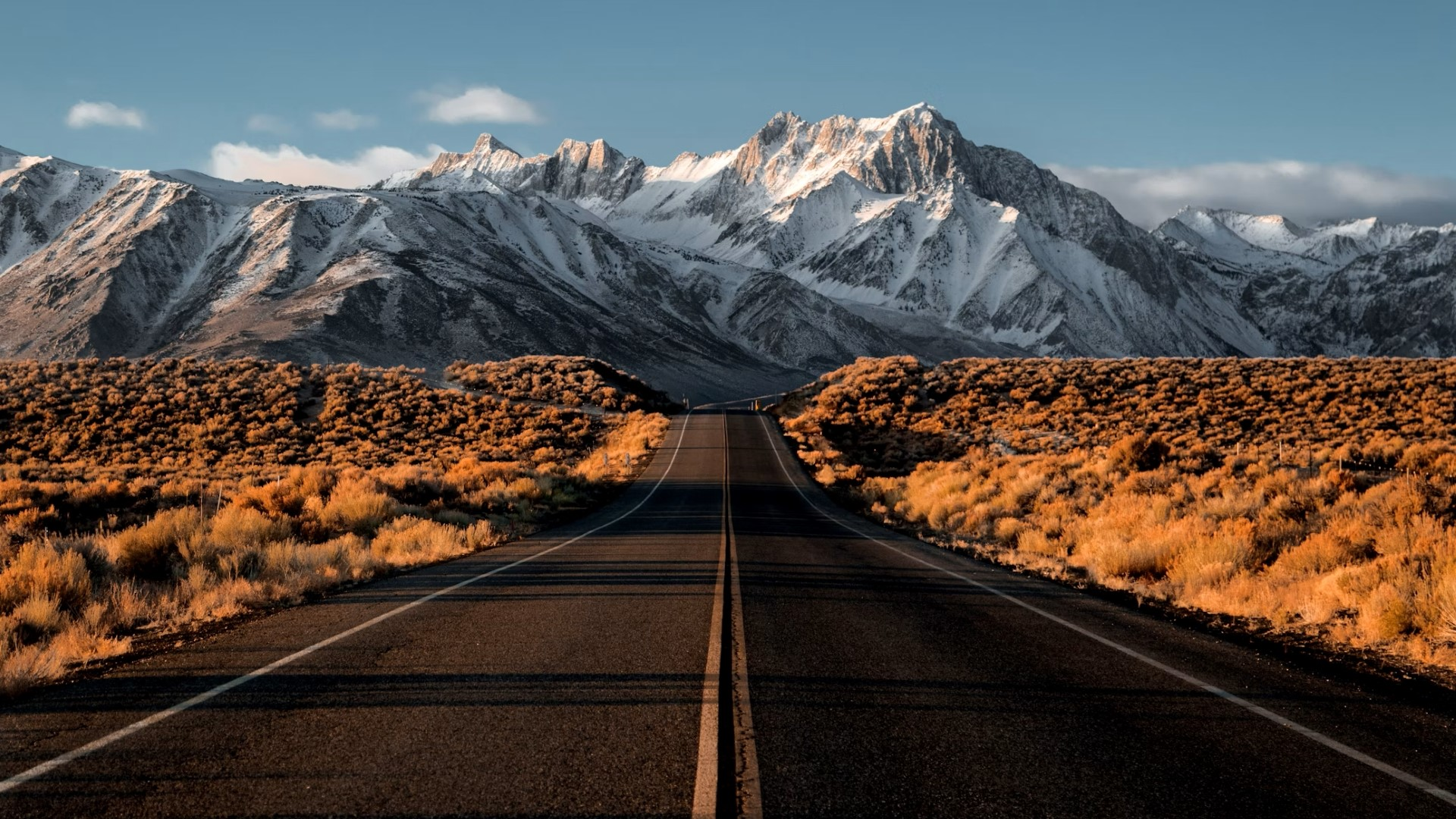
Mount Baldwin (left, under cloud), Mount Morrison (right) seen from the north on Benton Crossing Road in Long Valley, California

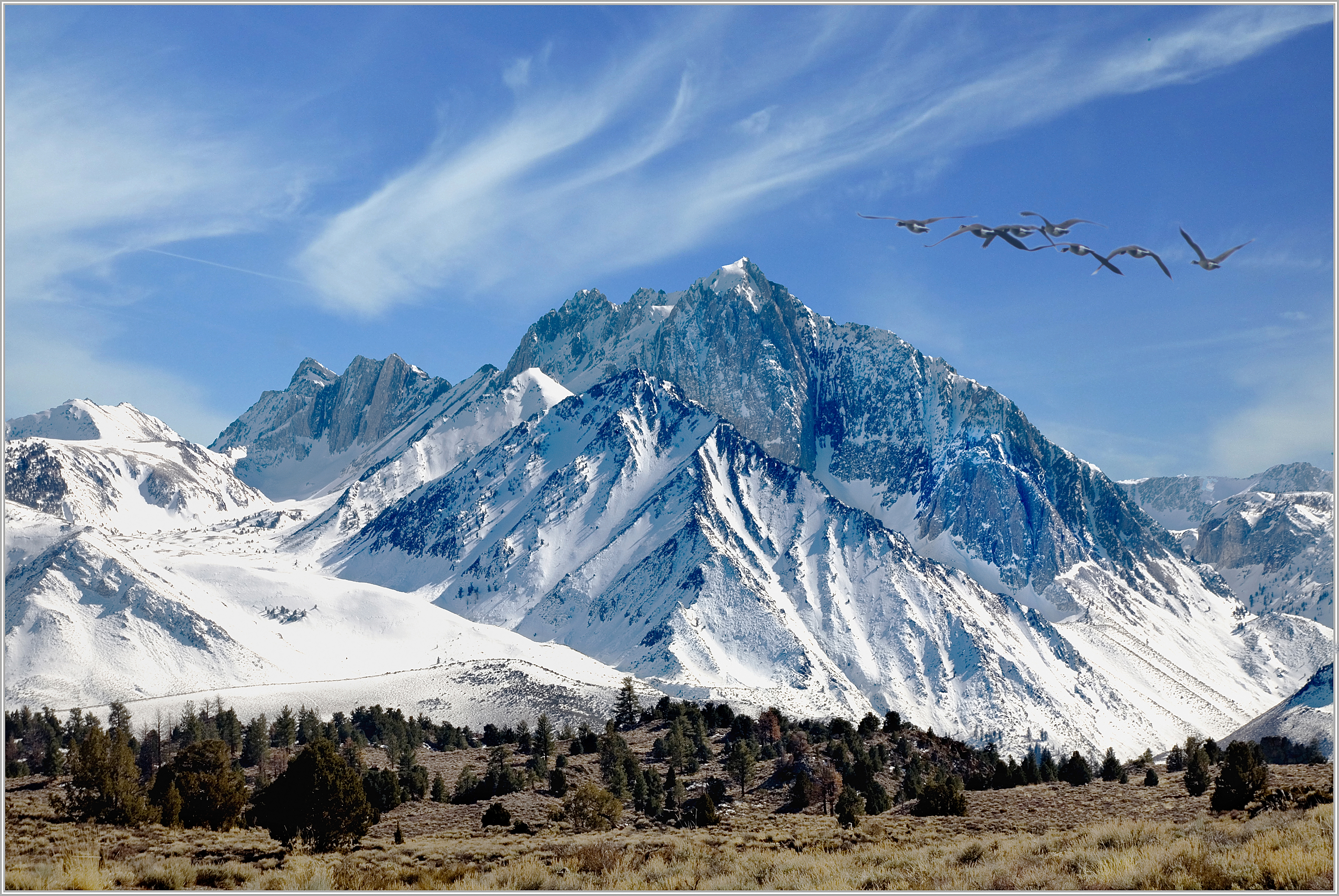
Baldwin behind left of Mount Morrison seen from the north

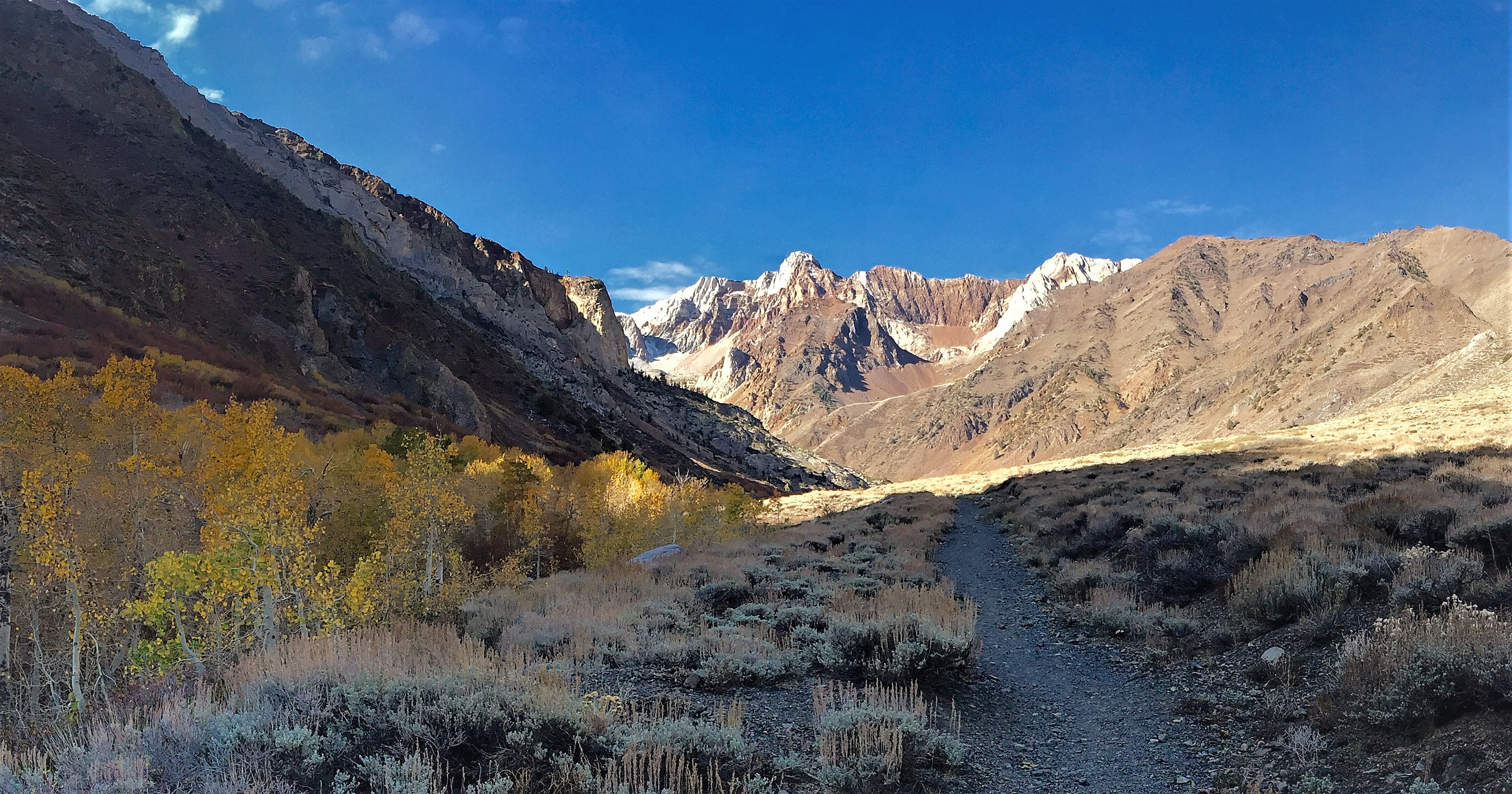

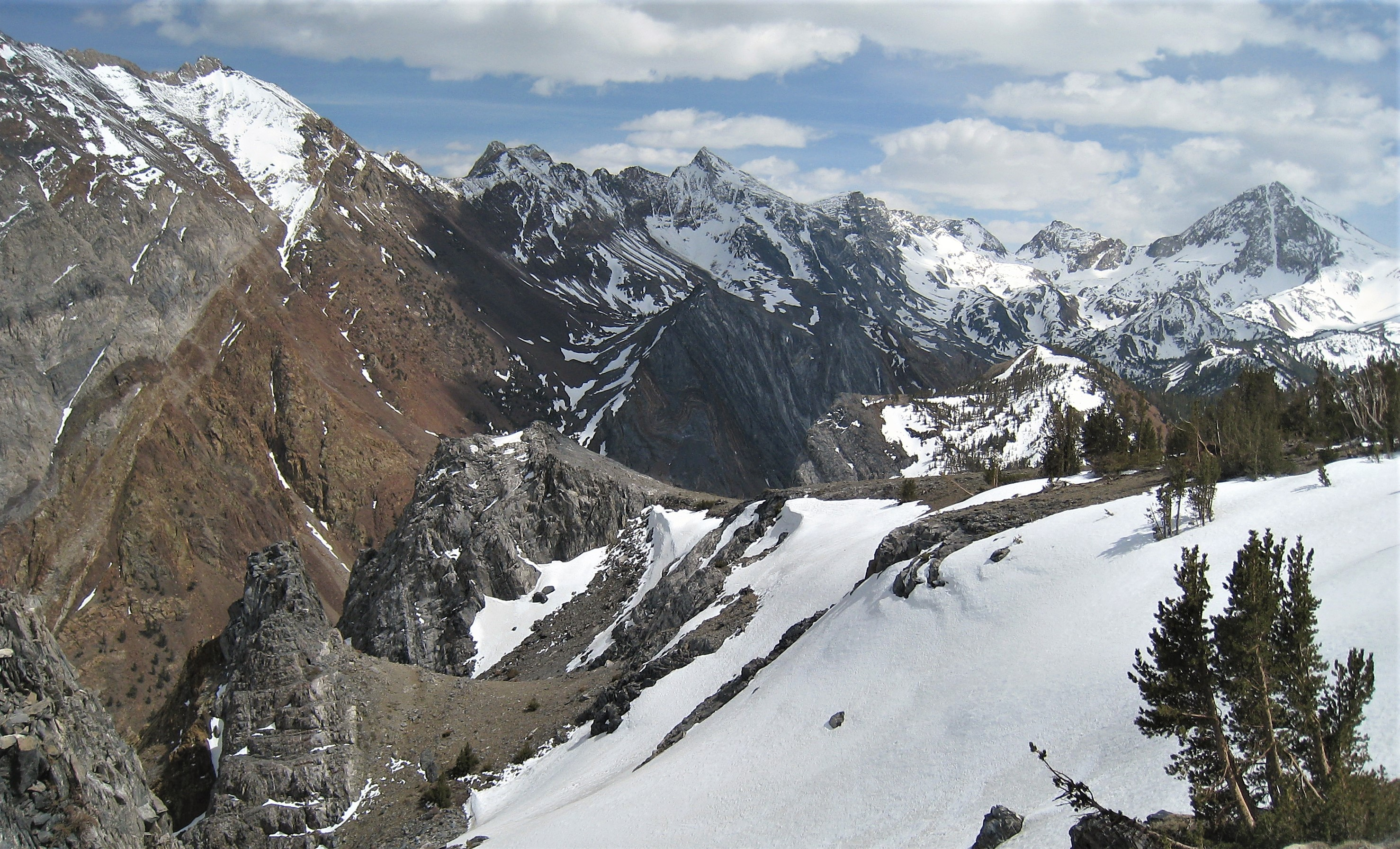
Slope of Mount Morrison (left), Mount Baldwin centered, Red Slate Mountain (right) from Laurel Mountain.

== See also ==
- List of mountain peaks of California
