= Mount Morrison (California) =

Mountain in the American state of California

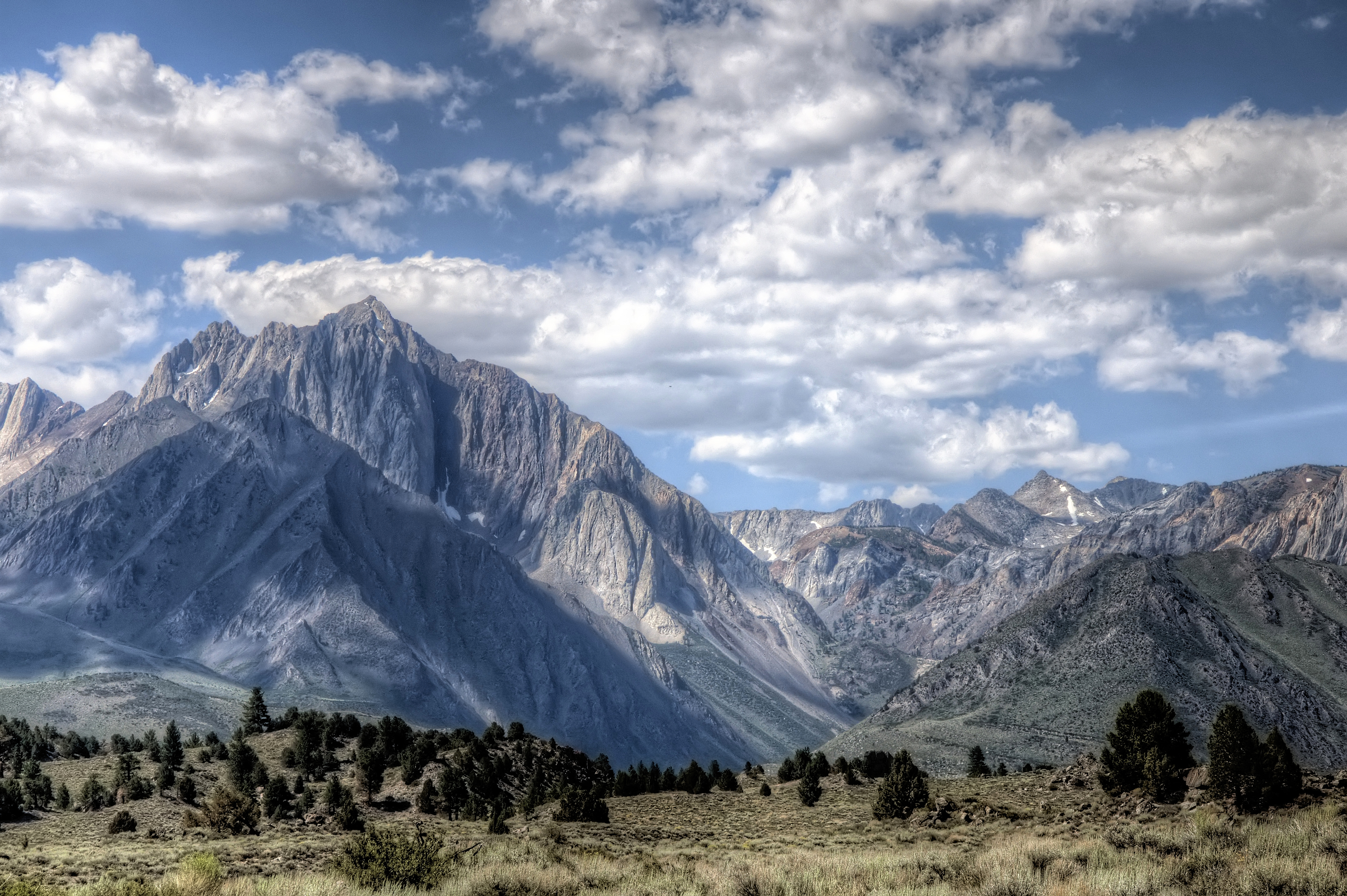
- Mount Morrison from Long Valley

Highest point
- Elevation: 12,241 ft (3,731 m) NAVD 88
- Prominence: 164 ft (50 m)
- Listing: SPS Mountaineers peak; Western States Climbers Star peak
- Coordinates: 37°33′41″N 118°51′30″W

Geography
- Location within California Location within the United States
- Location: Mono County, California. U.S.
- Parent range: Sierra Nevada
- Topo map: USGS Convict Lake

Geology
- Rock age: Paleozoic
- Mountain type: Metamorphic rock

Climbing
- First ascent: 1928 by Norman Clyde or John Mendendhall
- Easiest route: Scramble, class 2

Mount Morrison is located in the Sierra Nevada, in the Sherwin Range. It rises south of Convict Lake near the town of Mammoth Lakes.

== History ==
The mountain was named for Robert Morrison, a merchant in the town of Benton, who was killed near Convict Lake on September 23, 1871, while he was acting as member of a posse pursuing escaped convicts from the Nevada State Penitentiary. Nearby is Mono Jim Peak which is named for Mono Jim, a Paiute guide, who died in the same gun fight.

== Climbing ==
Sources state that Norman Clyde climbed to the peak on June 22, 1928, and that John Mendendhall also reached the summit in 1928 but the month of his ascent is not documented. There are several routes to the summit, the easiest consisting of a Class 2 scramble and bushwack.

Due to its imposing north face, Mount Morrison is also nicknamed the "Eiger of the Sierra." The east face consists of extremely loose rock and one should exercise extreme caution when attempting the face.

On April 14–15, 2023, climbers Jack Cramer, Tad McCrea, and Vitaliy Musiyenko made the first ascent of Troll Toll (600m, 16 pitches, WI3 M5/6) on Mount Morrison's northeast face. In 2024, members of the Piolets d'Or technical committee named the climb one of the most notable climbs of 2023.

== Geology ==
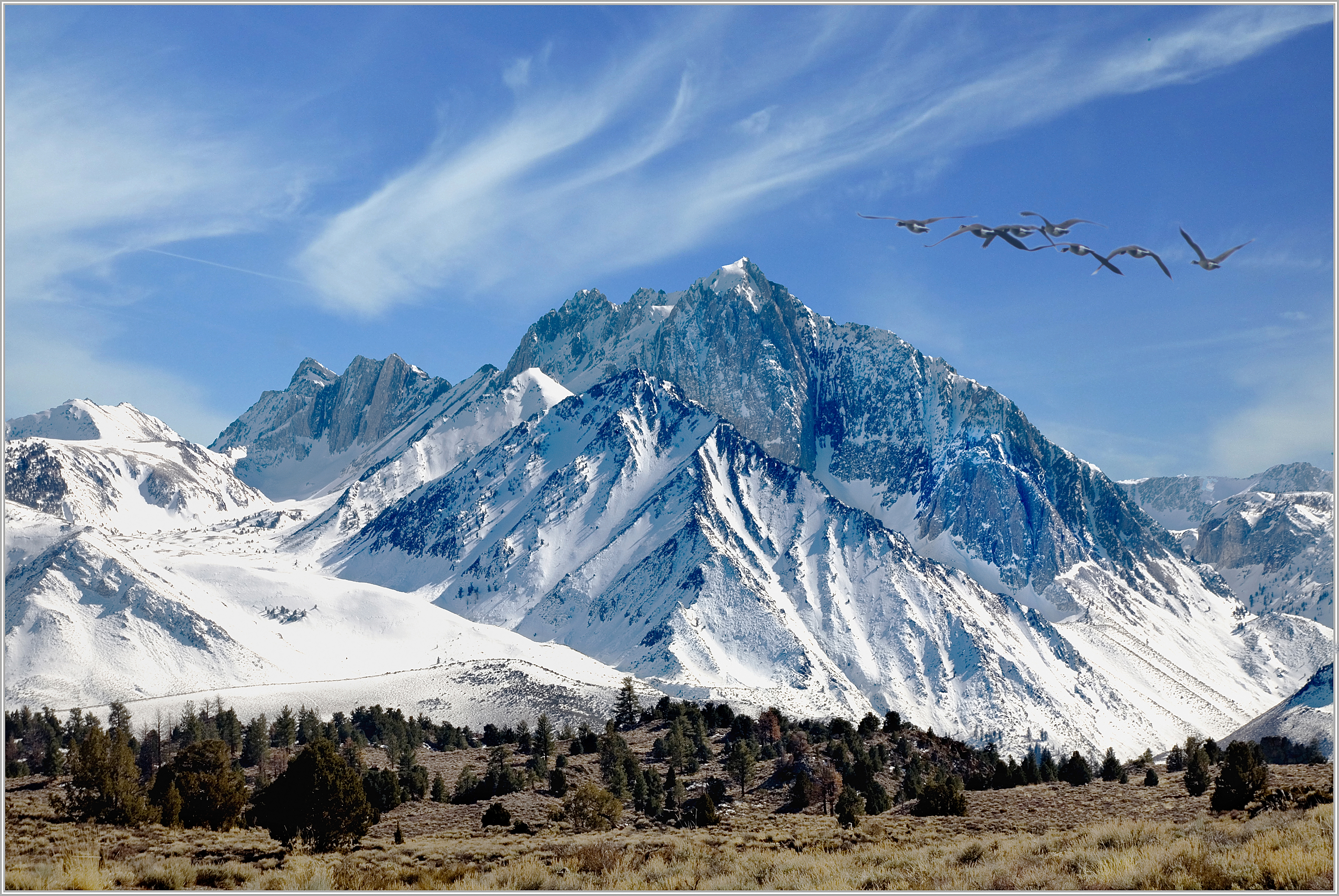
Morrison centered, with Mt. Baldwin behind, left

Highly tilted and faulted metasedimentary rocks are exposed on Mount Morrison. Formations include the Ordovician Convict Lake Formation (argillite and siliceous hornfels and slate), the Lower Devonian to Silurian Aspen Meadow Formation (siliceous and calc-silicate hornfels), the Middle Devonian Mount Morrison Sandstone (calcareous quartz sandstone), and the Upper Devonian Squares Tunnel Formation (black chert and argillite). The Mount Morrison Fault passes near the summit.

Fulgurites, natural hollow glass tubes, are found at the top of the mountain. These oddities are formed by lightning acting on certain types of sand or soil.
