= Laurel Mountain (California) =

Mountain in Mono County, California, United States

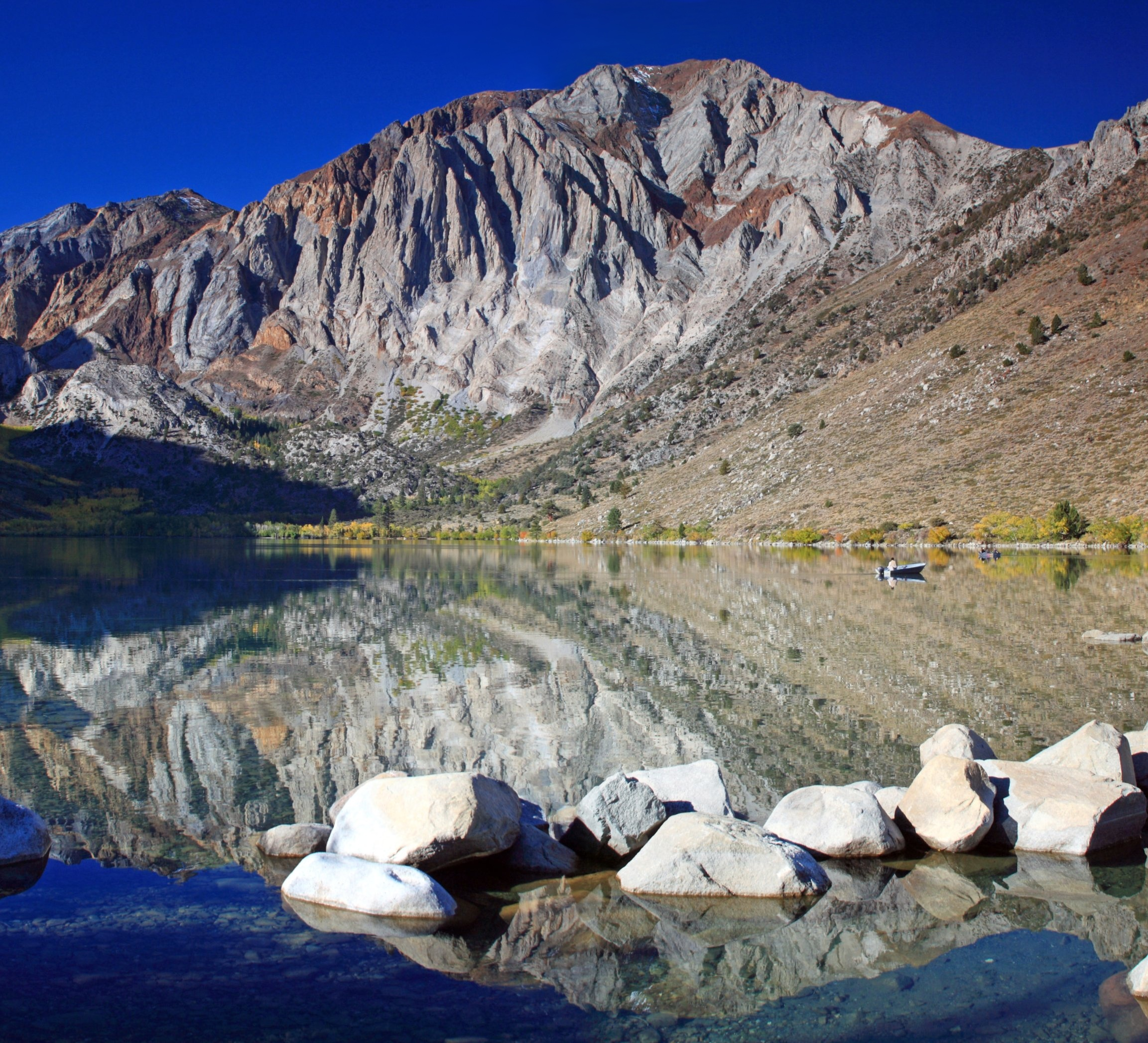
- Laurel Mountain, from the shore of Convict Lake

Highest point
- Elevation: 11,818 ft (3,602 m) NAVD 88
- Prominence: 1,018 ft (310 m)
- Coordinates: 37°34′49″N 118°53′29″W

Geography
- Location within California Location within the United States
- Location: Mono County, California, United States
- Parent range: Sherwin Range, Sierra Nevada
- Topo map: USGS Bloody Mountain

Climbing
- First ascent: 1926 by Norman Clyde
- Easiest route: Hike, class 1

Laurel Mountain is a peak in Mono County, California. It lies in the Sherwin Range of the Sierra Nevada and is in the Inyo National Forest and the John Muir Wilderness. It reaches a height of 11,818 feet (3,602 m) and is largely composed of metamorphic rock caused by contact with an intruding pluton in the late Cretaceous.

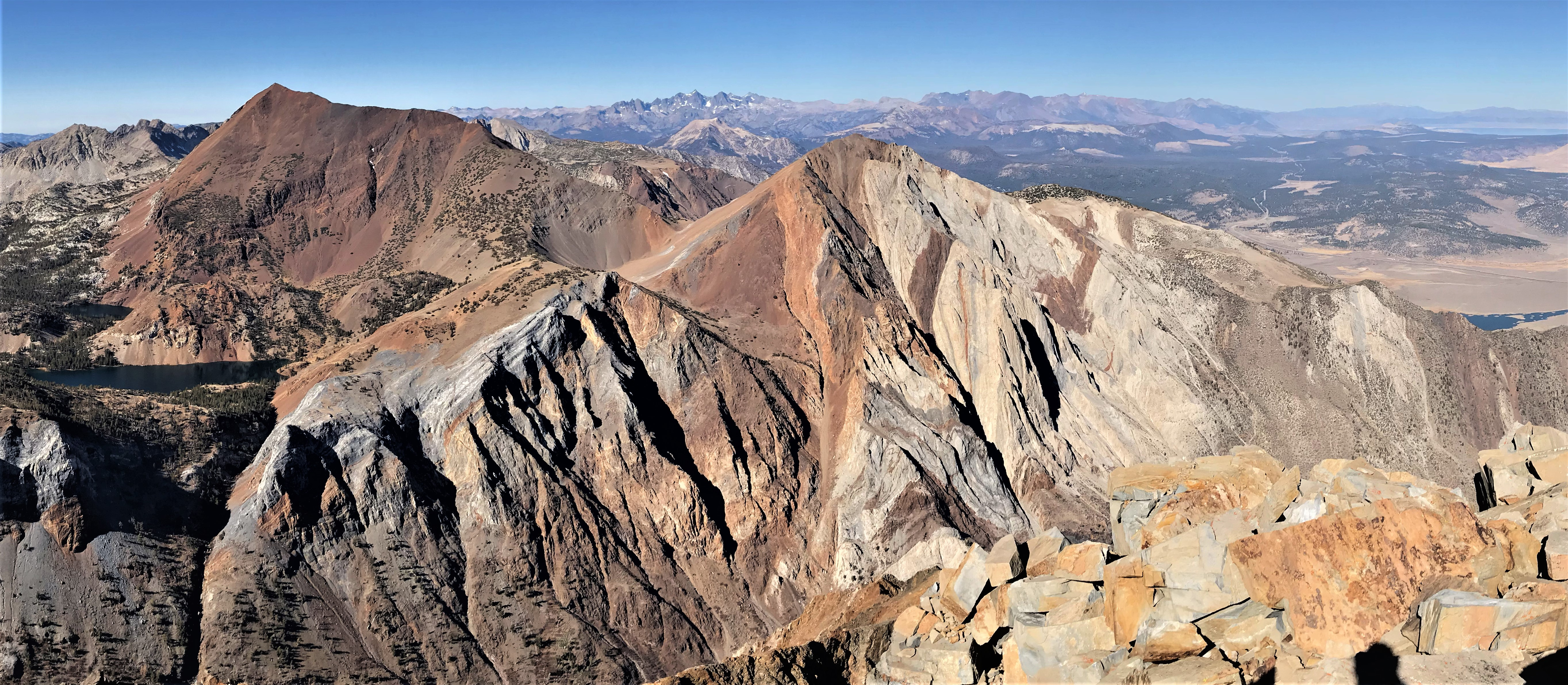
Laurel Mountain centered and Bloody Mountain (left), as seen from Mt. Morrison.
