= Mount Morgan (Mono County, California) =

Mountain in California, United States

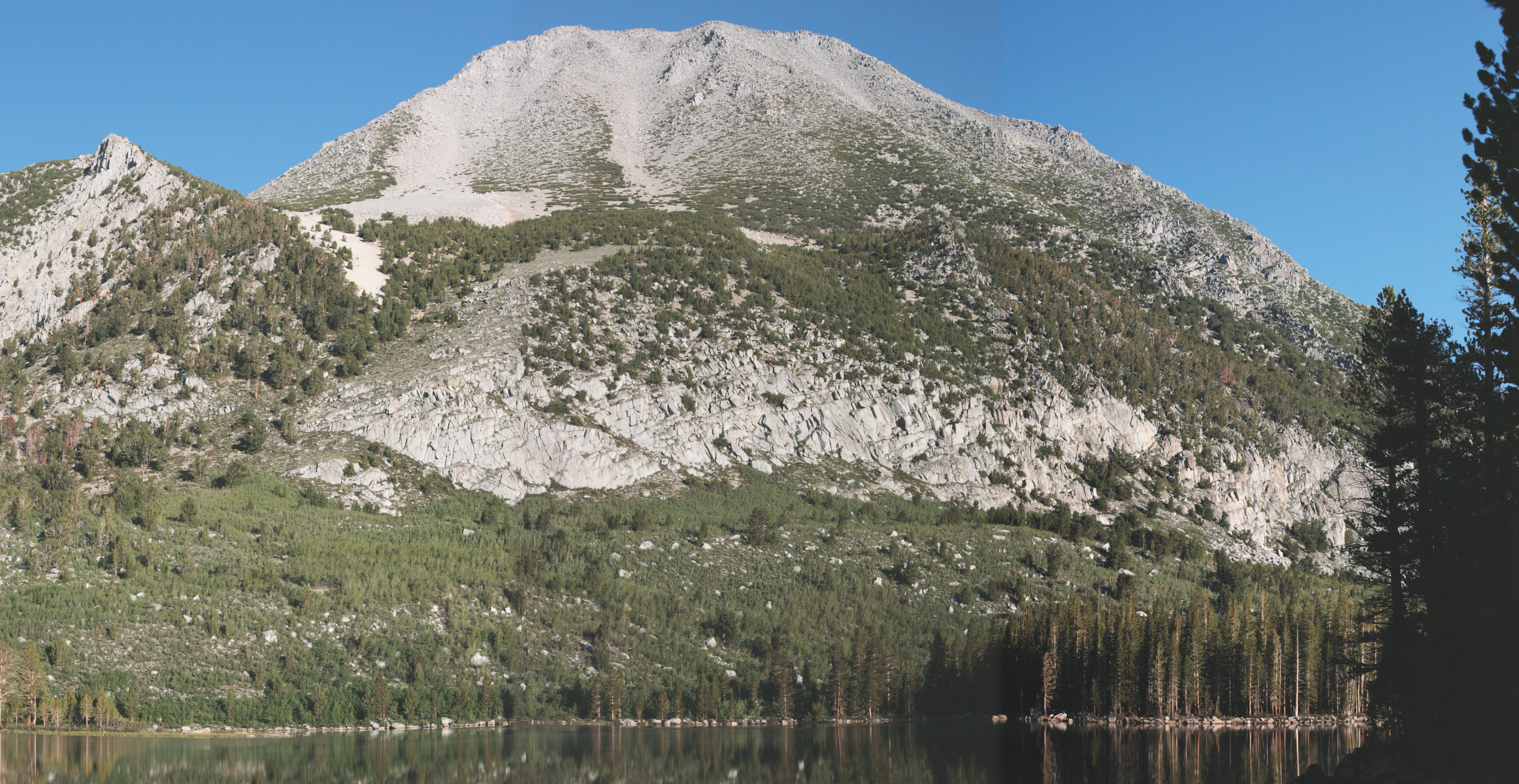
- Mount Morgan from Davis Lake

Highest point
- Elevation: 12,998+ ft (3,962+ m) NAVD 88
- Prominence: 1,472 ft (449 m)
- Listing: Sierra Peaks Section
- Coordinates: 37°30′41″N 118°46′47″W

Geography
- Location within California Location within the United States
- Location: Mono County, California, U.S.
- Parent range: Sierra Nevada
- Topo map: USGS Convict Lake

Climbing
- First ascent: 1934 by David Brower and Norman Clyde
- Easiest route: Hike, arduous class 1

Mount Morgan is the highest point on Nevahbe Ridge in the Sherwin Range of the Sierra Nevada. It lies in Mono County, California, between McGee Canyon and Hilton Lakes. The mountain is in the John Muir Wilderness Area in the Inyo National Forest.

== Climate ==
According to the Köppen climate classification system, Mount Morgan is located in an alpine climate zone. Most weather fronts originate in the Pacific Ocean, and travel east toward the Sierra Nevada mountains. As fronts approach, they are forced upward by the peaks (orographic lift), causing them to drop their moisture in the form of rain or snowfall onto the range

Climate data for Mount Morgan (Mono County) 37.5092 N, 118.7910 W, Elevation: 12,533 ft (3,820 m) (1991–2020 normals)
Month	Jan	Feb	Mar	Apr	May	Jun	Jul	Aug	Sep	Oct	Nov	Dec	Year
Mean daily maximum °F (°C)	28.4 (−2.0)	26.8 (−2.9)	29.6 (−1.3)	34.4 (1.3)	42.1 (5.6)	52.4 (11.3)	59.5 (15.3)	58.9 (14.9)	53.5 (11.9)	44.8 (7.1)	34.5 (1.4)	28.2 (−2.1)	41.1 (5.0)
Daily mean °F (°C)	18.8 (−7.3)	16.6 (−8.6)	19.0 (−7.2)	22.5 (−5.3)	29.7 (−1.3)	39.1 (3.9)	45.9 (7.7)	45.2 (7.3)	39.9 (4.4)	32.4 (0.2)	24.3 (−4.3)	18.8 (−7.3)	29.4 (−1.5)
Mean daily minimum °F (°C)	9.2 (−12.7)	6.4 (−14.2)	8.4 (−13.1)	10.6 (−11.9)	17.3 (−8.2)	25.8 (−3.4)	32.2 (0.1)	31.5 (−0.3)	26.3 (−3.2)	20.1 (−6.6)	14.1 (−9.9)	9.3 (−12.6)	17.6 (−8.0)
Average precipitation inches (mm)	9.27 (235)	8.15 (207)	7.02 (178)	4.10 (104)	2.66 (68)	0.64 (16)	0.54 (14)	0.39 (9.9)	0.50 (13)	2.42 (61)	3.23 (82)	8.06 (205)	46.98 (1,192.9)
Source: PRISM Climate Group

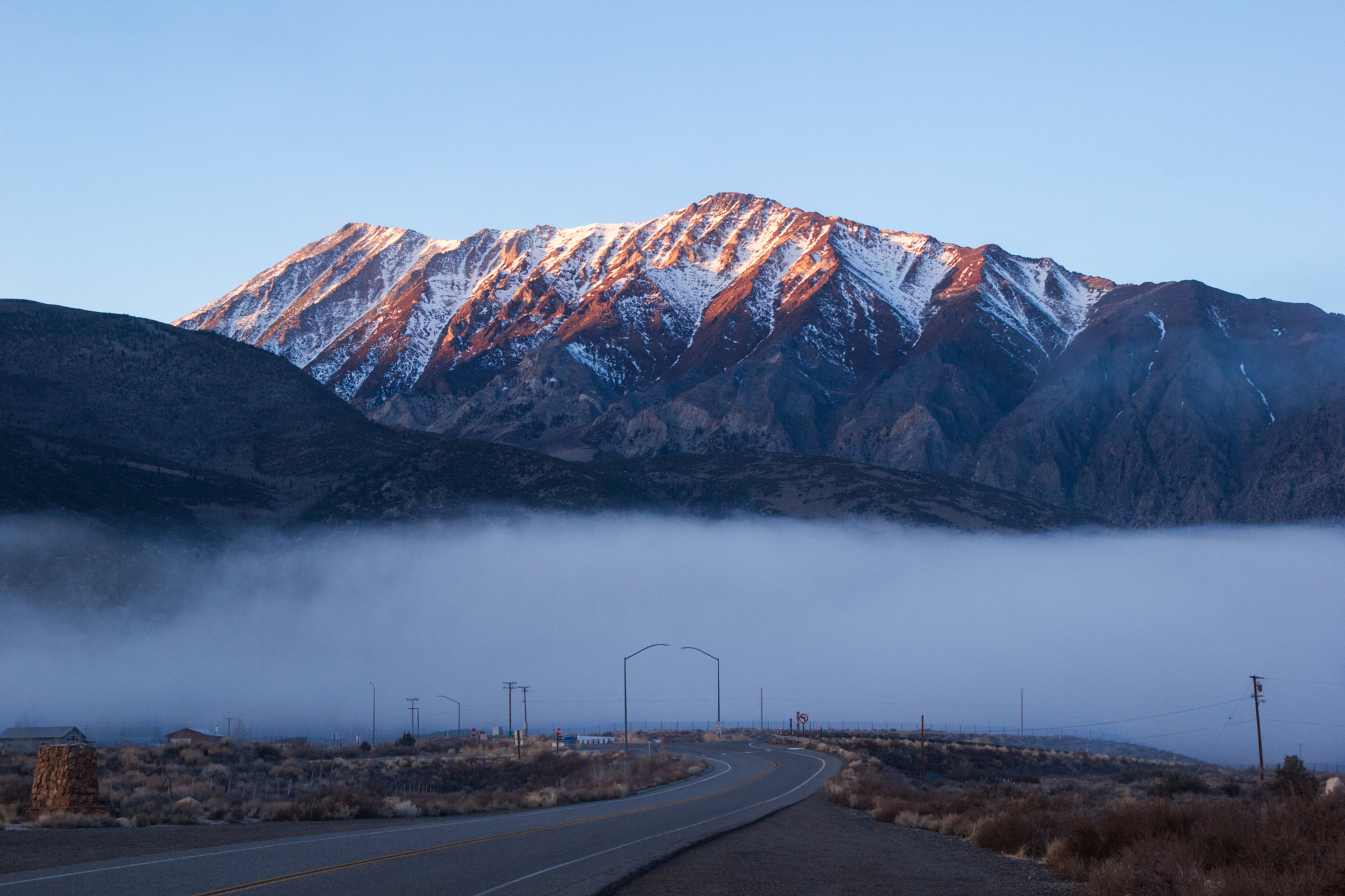
North aspect of Nevahbe Ridge with summit of Morgan at the left end.
