= Red and White Mountain =

Mountain in California, United States

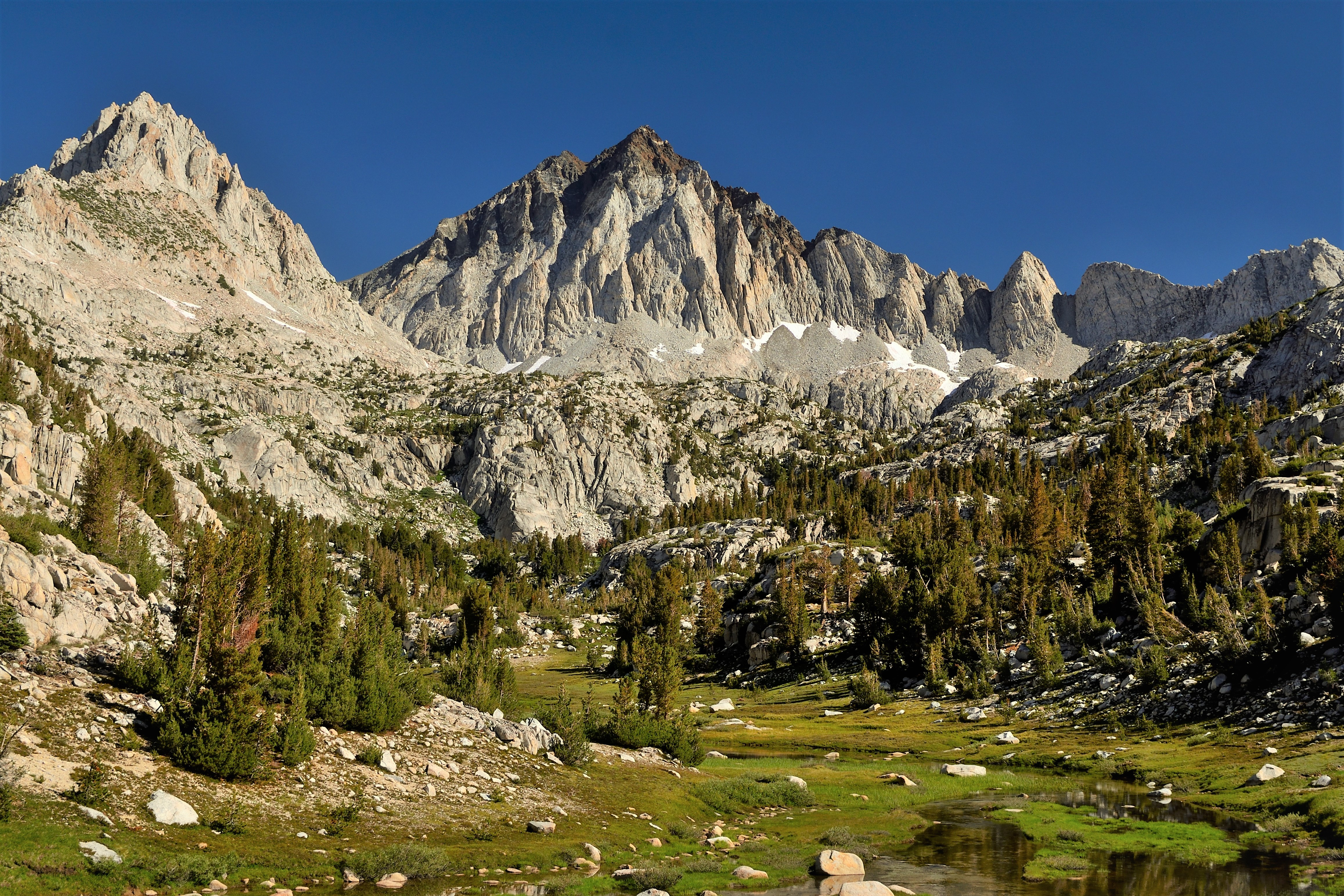
- South aspect

Highest point
- Elevation: 12,816 ft (3,906 m)
- Prominence: 936 ft (285 m)
- Parent peak: Red Slate Mountain (13,163 ft)
- Isolation: 2.03 mi (3.27 km)
- Listing: Sierra Peaks Section
- Coordinates: 37°28′48″N 118°51′26″W

Geography
- Location within California Location within the United States
- Location: Fresno County / Mono County; California, U.S.
- Parent range: Sierra Nevada
- Topo map: USGS Mount Abbot

Geology
- Rock type(s): granite, slate

Climbing
- First ascent: 1902
- Easiest route: class 2 Southwest Face

Red and White Mountain is a remote 12,816-foot-elevation (3,906-meter) mountain summit located on the crest of the Sierra Nevada mountain range in northern California, United States. It is situated in the John Muir Wilderness on the shared boundary of Sierra National Forest with Inyo National Forest, and along the common border of Fresno County with Mono County. It is eight miles northeast of Lake Thomas A Edison, and approximately 13 miles (21 km) southeast of the community of Mammoth Lakes. The nearest higher neighbor is Red Slate Mountain, 2 miles (3.2 km) to the north-northwest.

== History ==
This mountain's descriptive name was applied by Theodore S. Solomons in 1894. It refers to the red slate and white granite that it is composed of. The first ascent of the summit was made July 18, 1902, by James S. Hutchinson, his brother Lincoln Hutchinson, and Charles A. Noble via the West Ridge. Norman Clyde first climbed the class 3 Northeast Ridge on July 3, 1928.

== Climate ==
According to the Köppen climate classification system, Red and White Mountain is located in an alpine climate zone. Most weather fronts originate in the Pacific Ocean, and travel east toward the Sierra Nevada mountains. As fronts approach, they are forced upward by the peaks, causing them to drop their moisture in the form of rain or snowfall onto the range (orographic lift). This climate supports a permanent ice field on the north slope. Precipitation runoff from the northwest side of this mountain drains into Red and White Lake thence Fish Creek, from the northeast side into Big McGee Lake and headwaters of McGee Creek, and from the south aspect into Grinnell Lake, thence Laurel Creek.

== Gallery ==
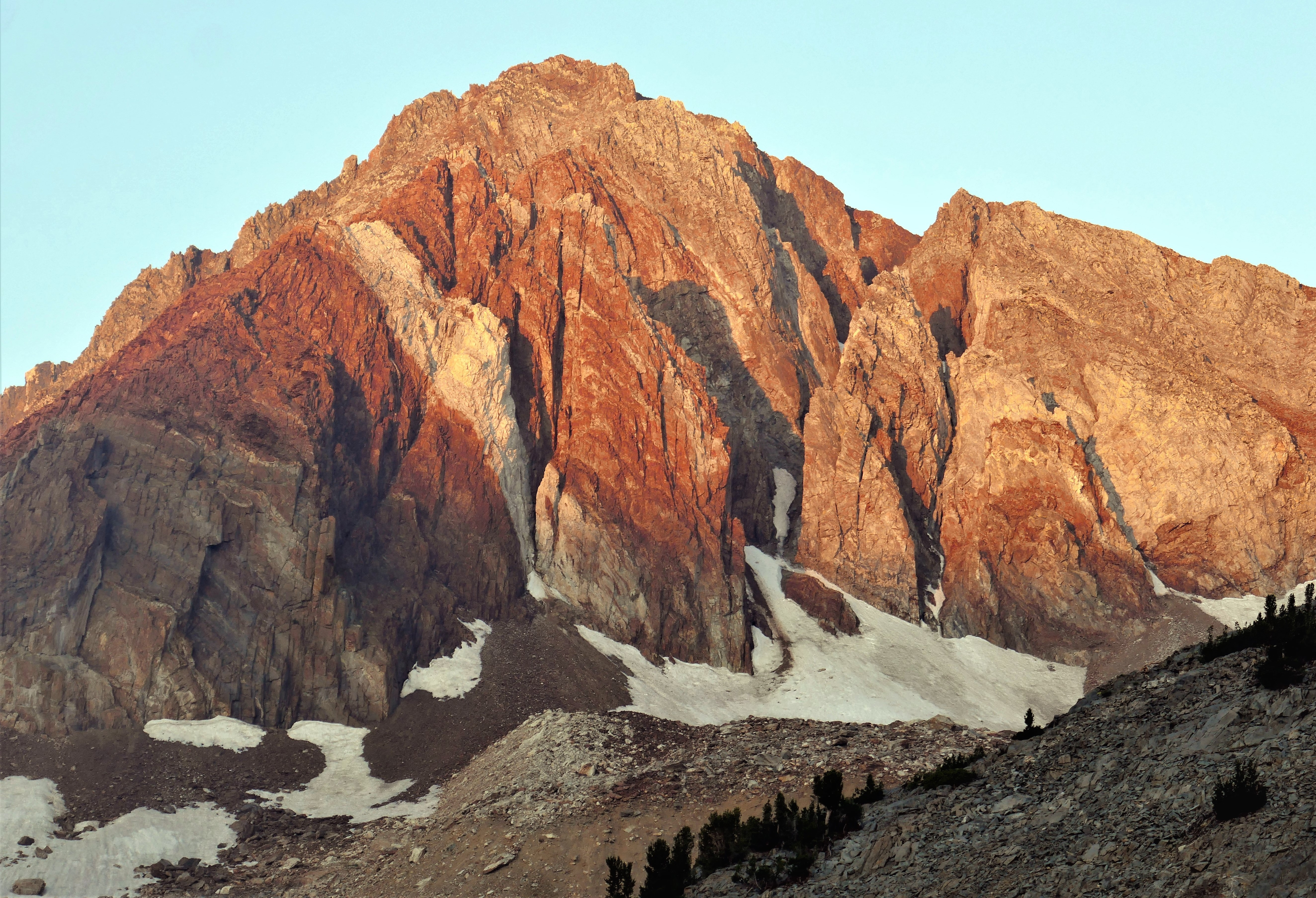
Northeast aspect
Note the vein of white quartz rock, 60 to 70 feet wide, within the red slate.

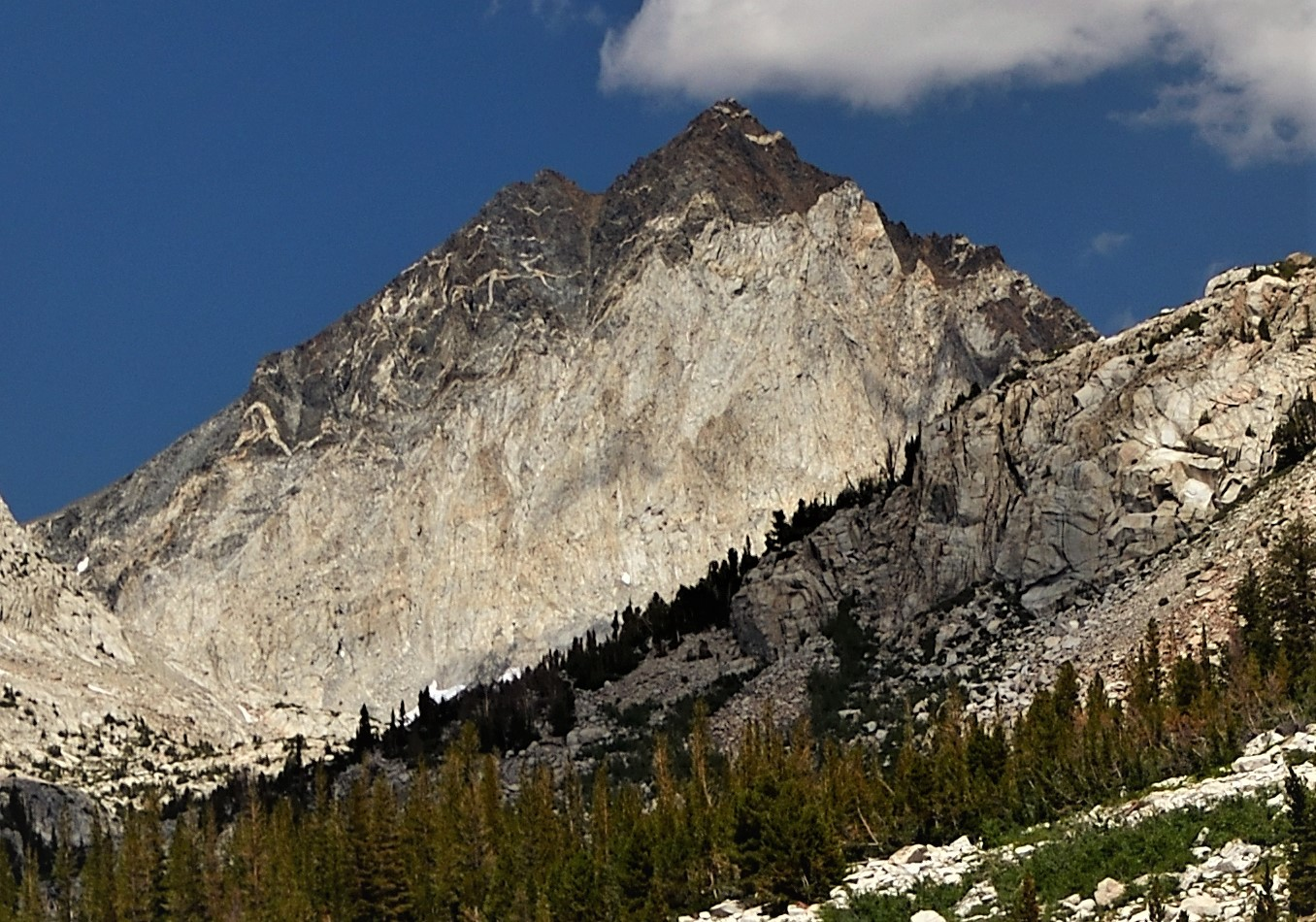
South aspect

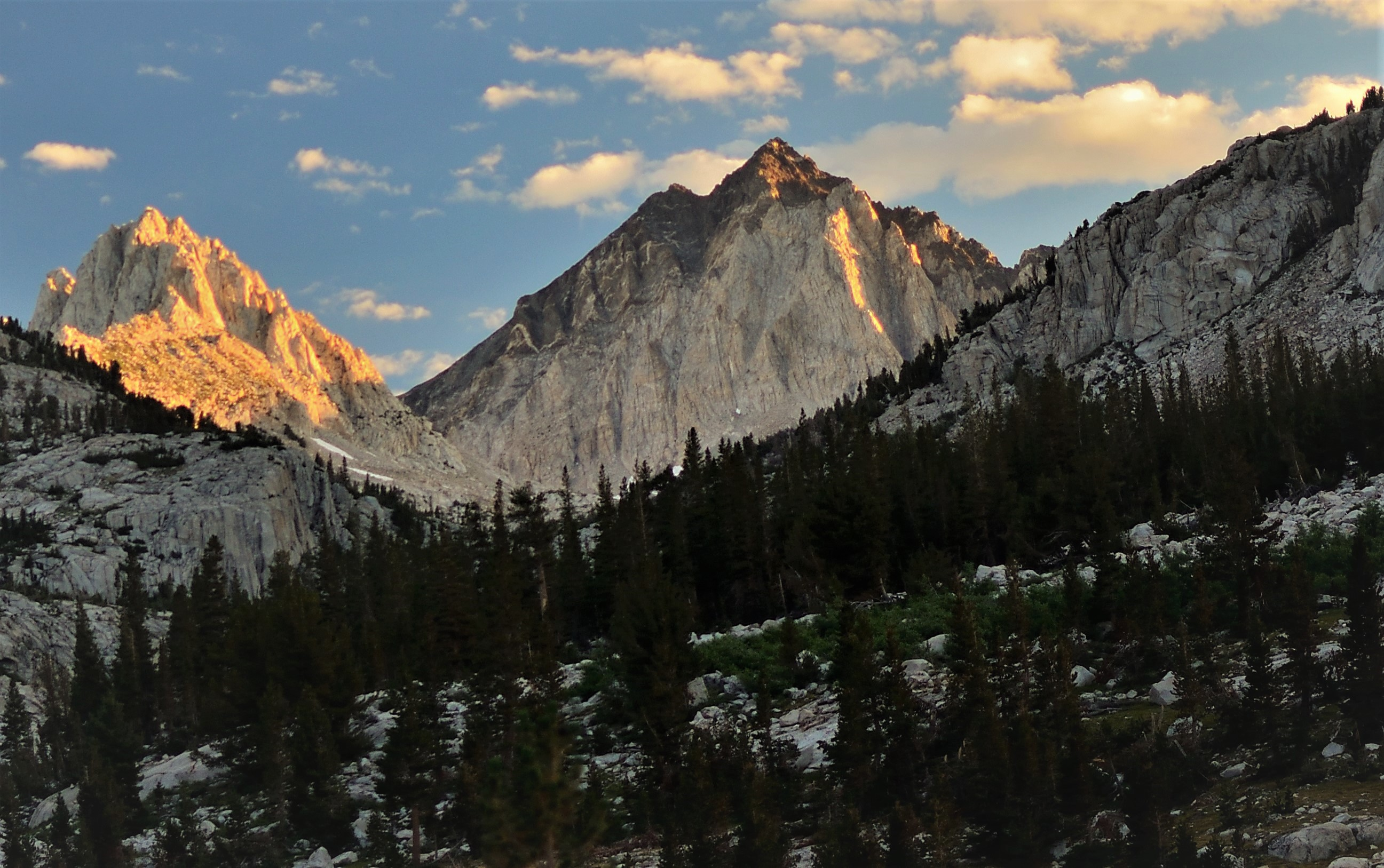
South aspect

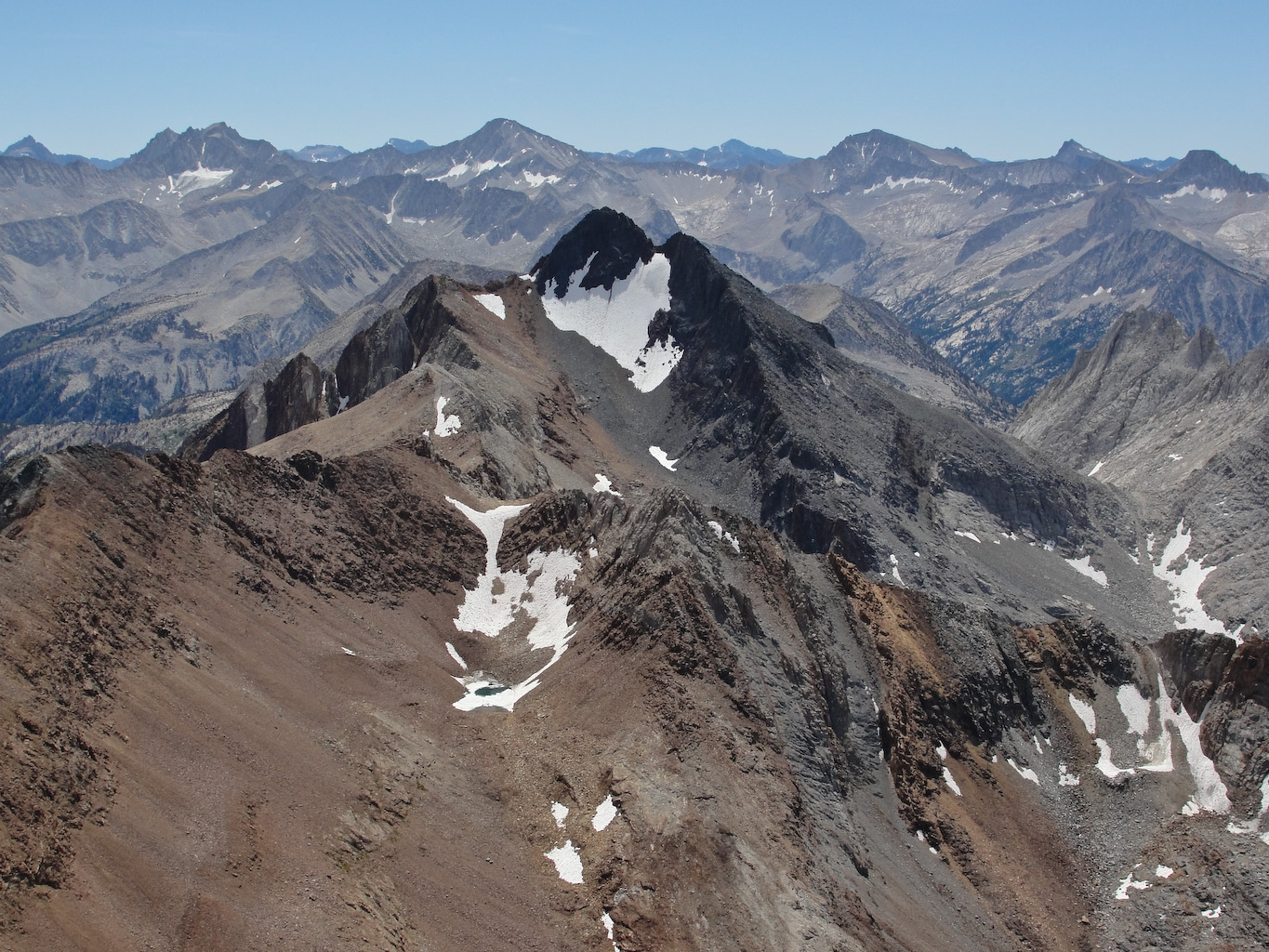
North face, from Red Slate Mountain

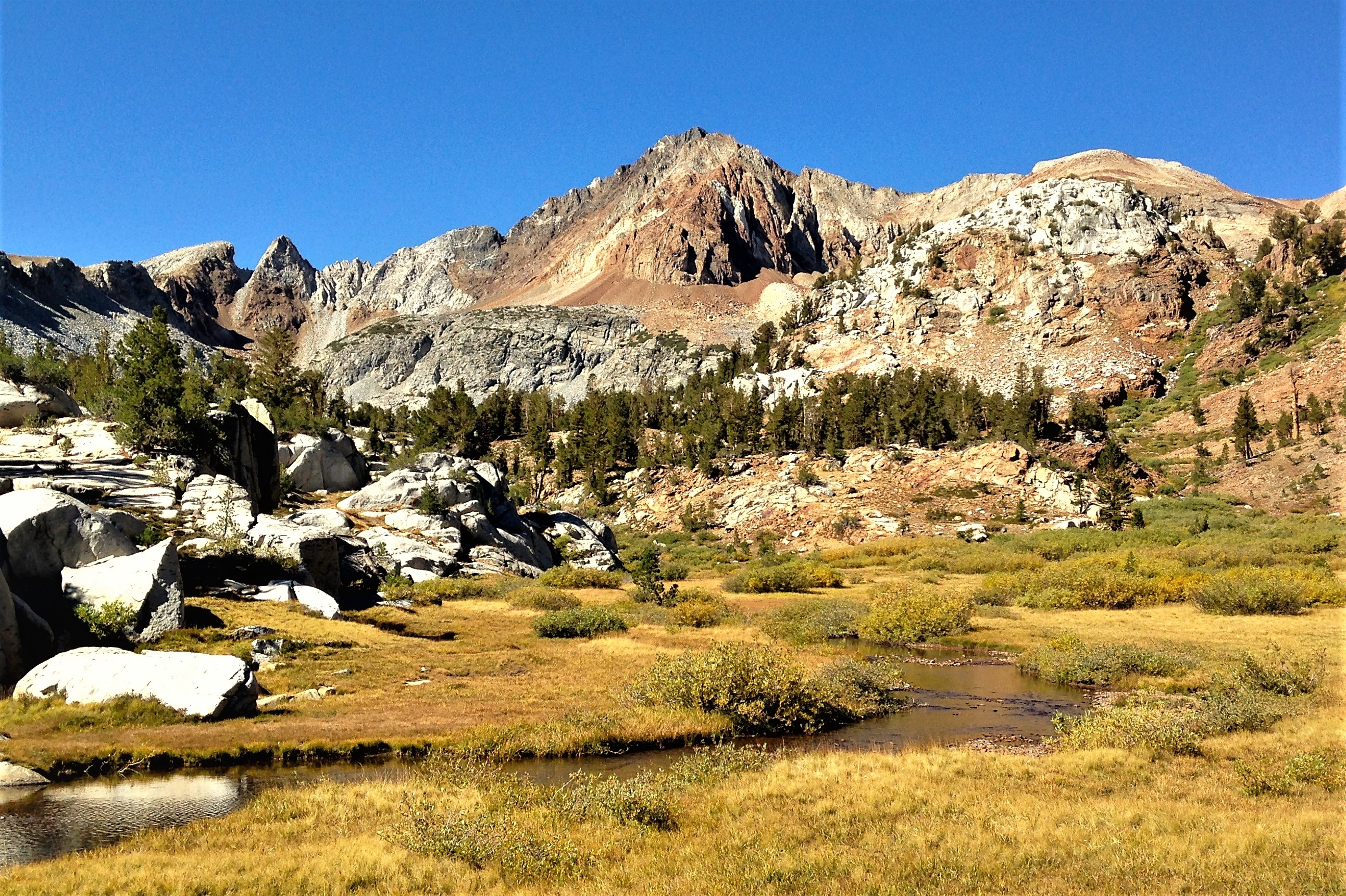
Red and White Mountain from the northeast along McGee Pass Trail

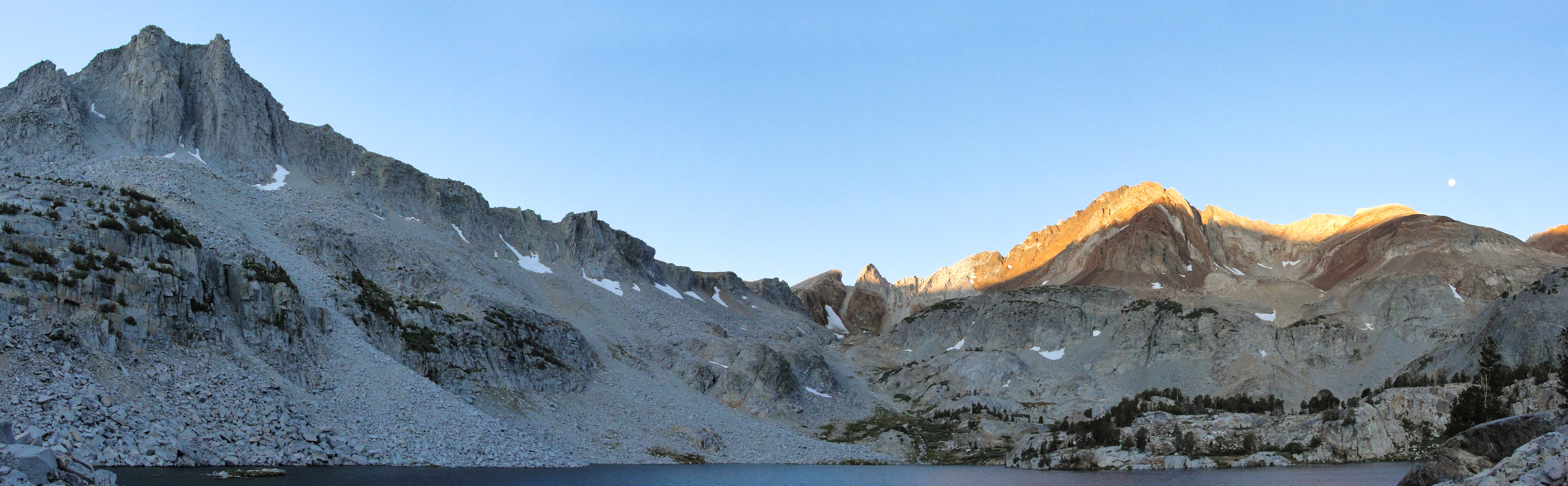
Mount Crocker (left), and Red and White Mountain (right) at sunrise

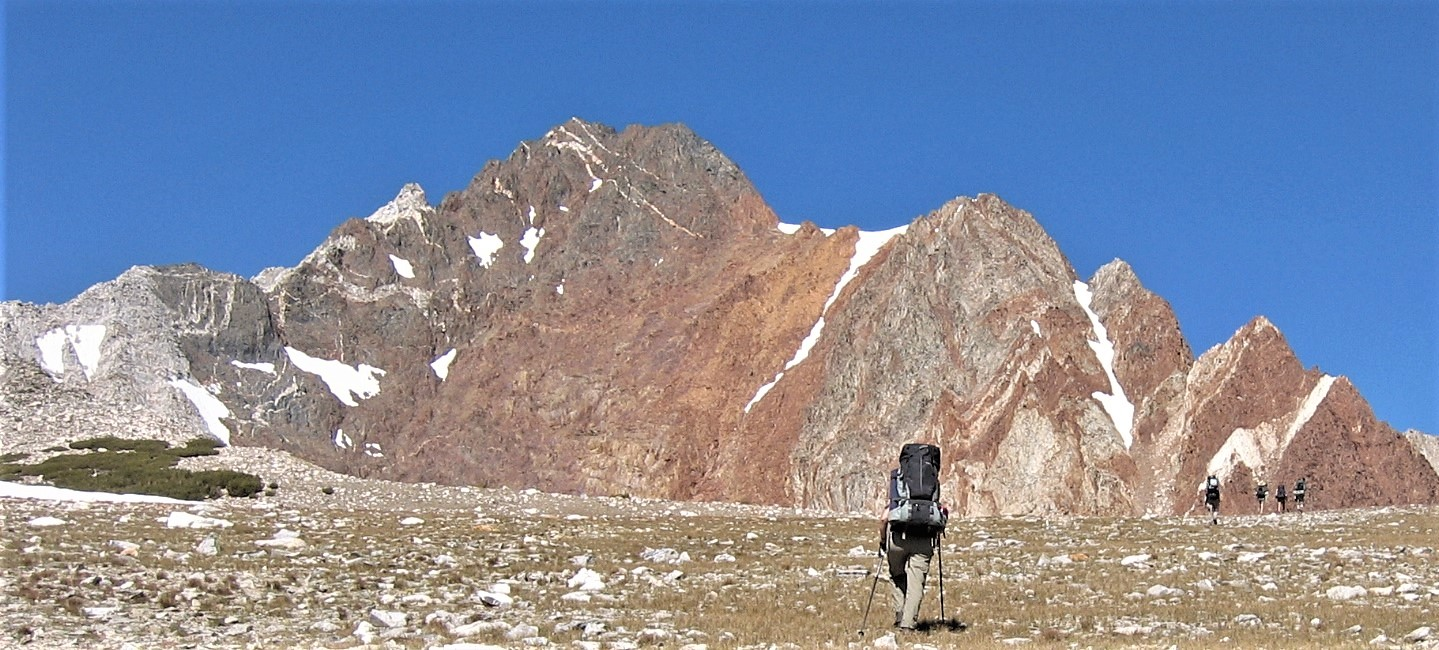
East aspect from Hopkins Pass area

== See also ==
- List of mountain peaks of California
