= Convict Lake =

Lake in California, United States

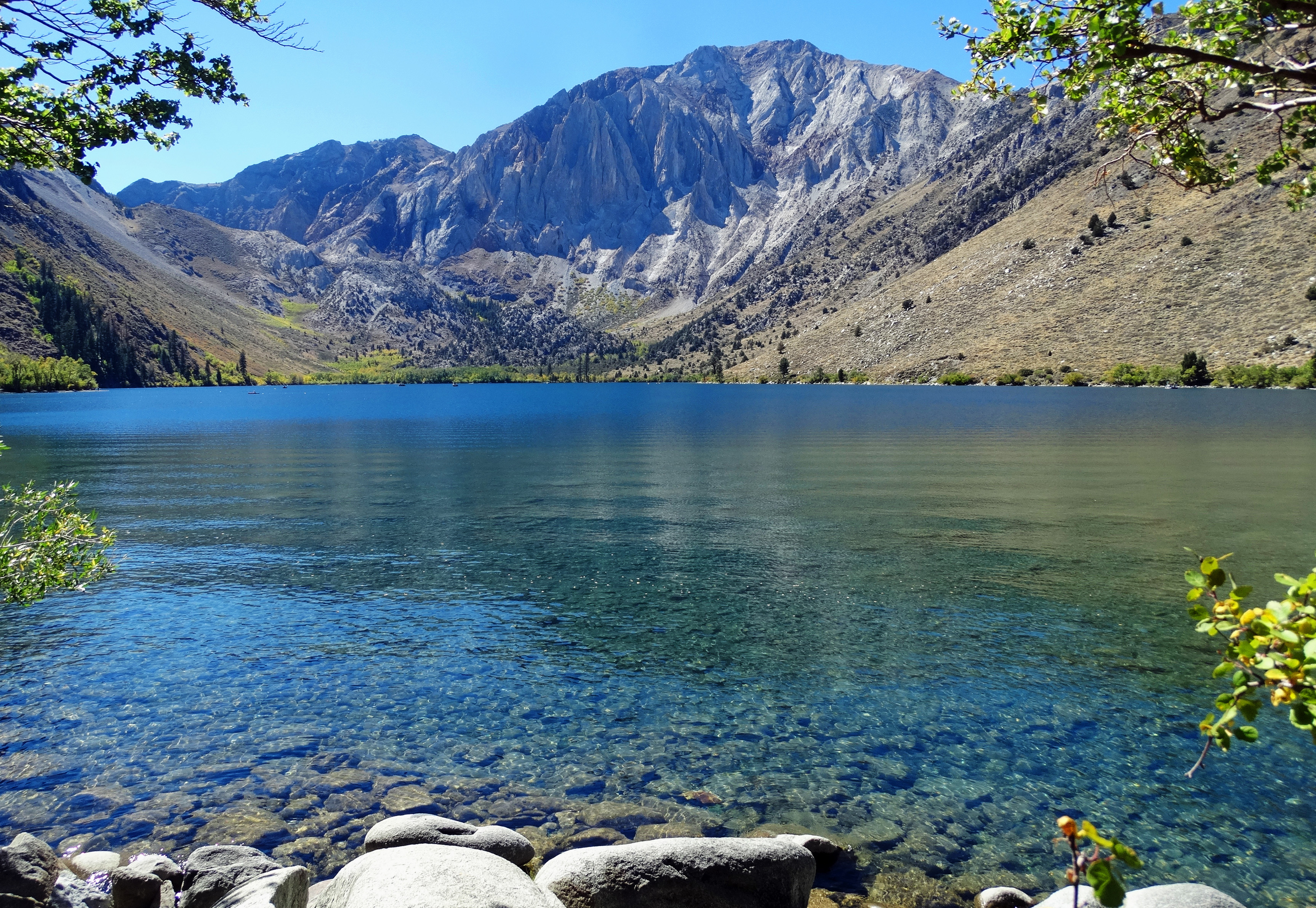
- Convict Lake, with Laurel Mountain in the background

- Location within California Convict Lake (the United States)
- Location: Mono County, California
- Coordinates: 37.589°N 118.858°W
- Basin countries: United States
- Max. length: 0.9 mi (1.4 km)
- Max. width: 0.4 mi (0.6 km)
- Surface area: 170 acres (69 ha)
- Max. depth: 140 feet (43 m)
- Surface elevation: 7,580 ft (2,310 m)

Convict Lake (Mono: Wit-sa-nap) is a lake located in Mono County, California, United States, situated in the Sherwin Range of the Sierra Nevada. It is known for its turquoise-blue water, the dramatic mountains (including Mount Morrison) that surround it, the trout fishing it affords, and its unusual history. The lake was renamed from its traditional Mono name by American settlers after an incident on September 23, 1871, in which a group of convicts escaped from prison in Carson City, Nevada, and took refuge near the lake. They were pursued by a posse, and after it caught up to the convicts, a shootout followed, in which a number of both posse members and convicts were killed or wounded. The remaining convicts who survived initially escaped but were eventually captured to be taken back to prison. They were lynched instead.

== Geography ==
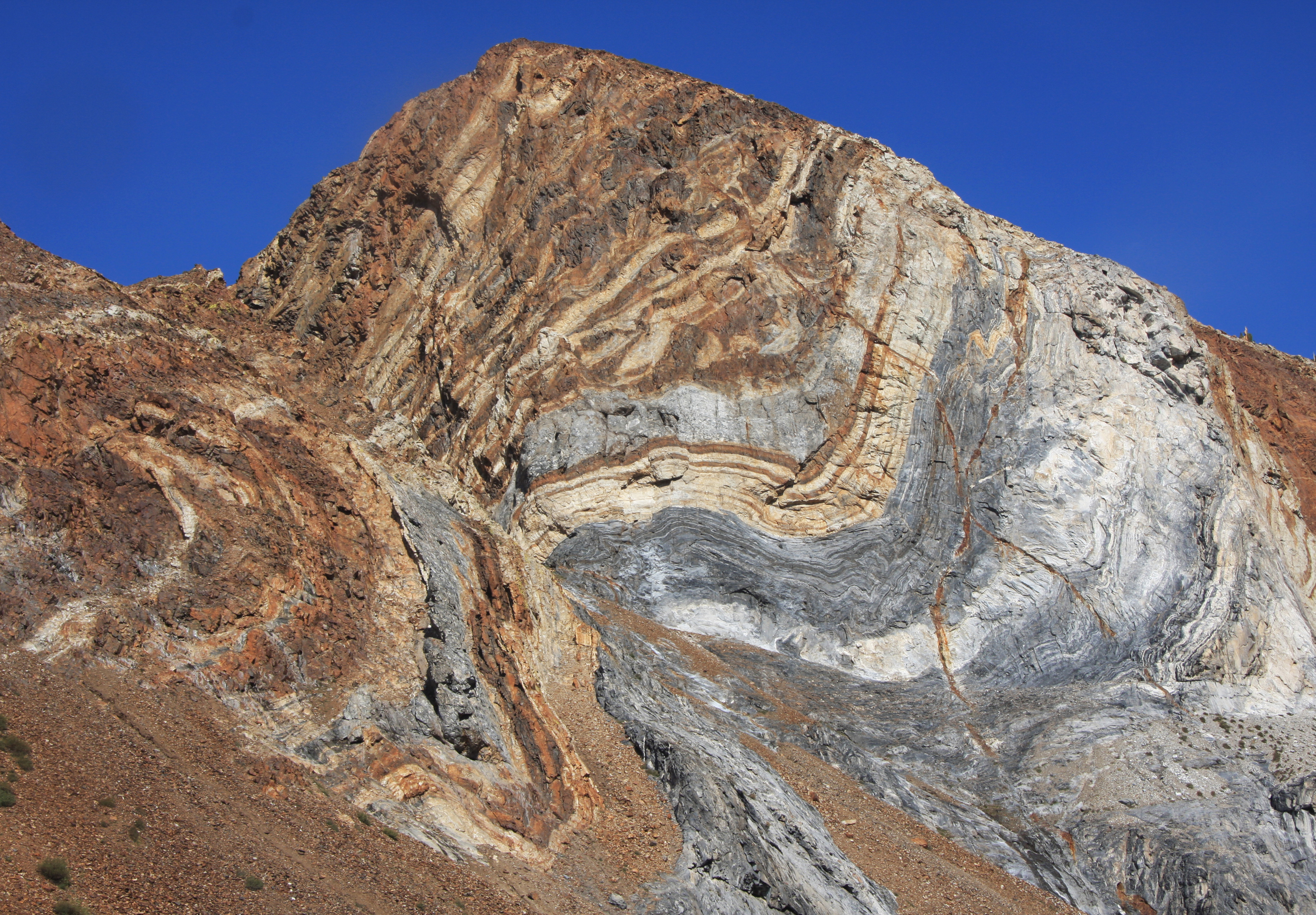
Sevehah Cliff, composed of folded metamorphic rock, provides a colorful backdrop to Convict Lake.

Convict Lake was originally carved out by glaciers. The lake's surface is approximately 7,580 feet (2,310 m) above sea level, with its greatest depths approximately 140 feet (43 m) deep in various places; it is among the deepest lakes in the Sierra Nevada mountains. The lake is oblong in shape and is surrounded by a box canyon set in the mountains. Mount Morrison, the tallest mountain in the area at 12,241 feet (3,731 m), lies to the south-east of the lake.

The lake and canyon area is dominated by light colored granite. The sedimentary and metamorphic rocks in this area once overlaid the entire Sierra Nevada range but have now been eroded away, revealing the underlying granite that uplifted the range. During the formation of the Sierra Nevada mountain range, magma rose from great depths and obliterated much of the sedimentary rock with which it came in contact. Just below the surface, the magma cooled and formed the granite typical of the range. In the process, extreme heat and pressure deformed the immediate overlying sedimentary rocks into numerous and striking shapes.

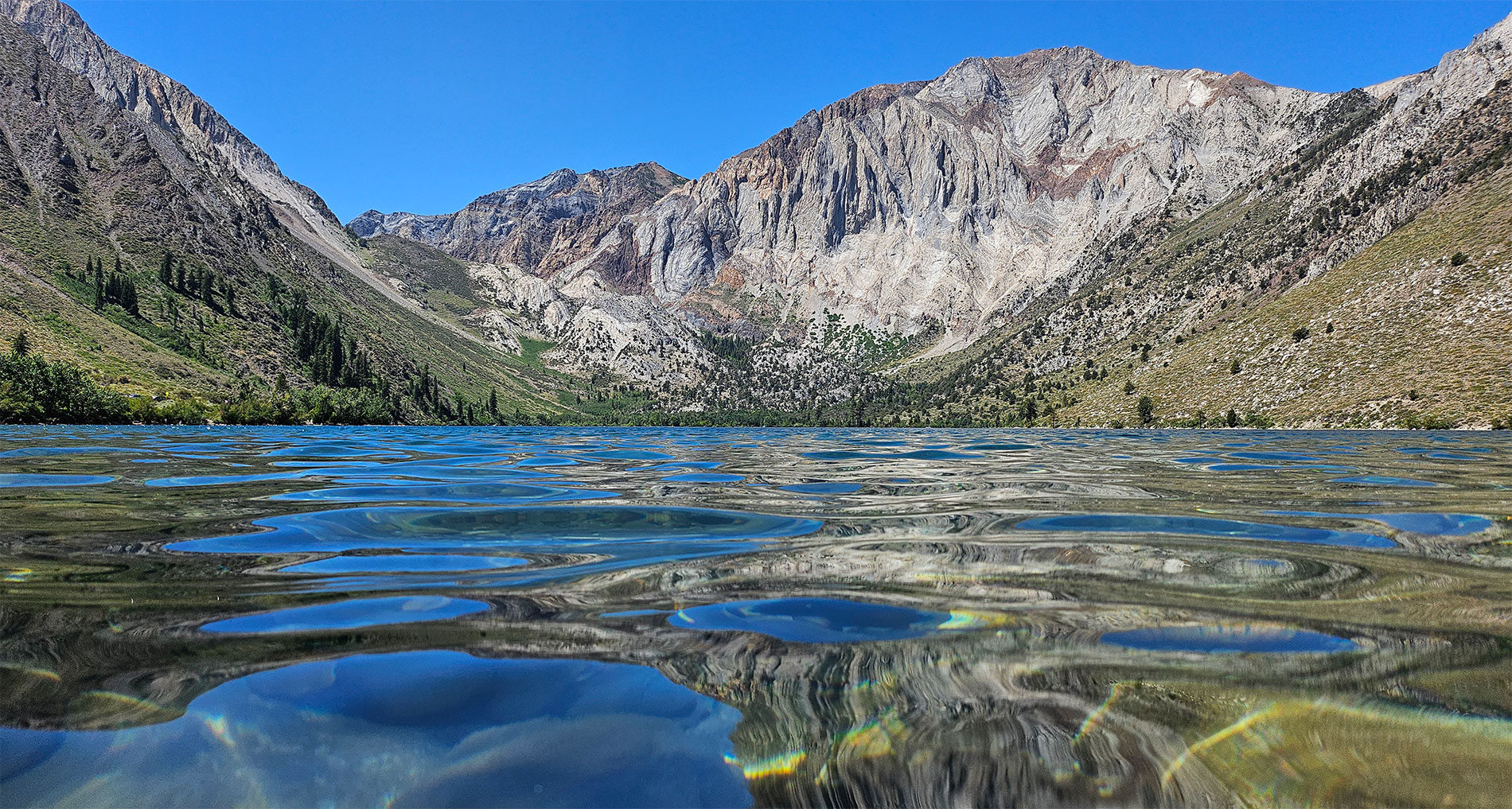
View across Convict Lake, towards Sevehah Cliff in the background

== History ==
The Paiute Indians of the region are said to have called Convict Lake Wit-sa-nap:

"The streams which flowed from the mountains were supposed to be filled with Pot-sa-wa-gees, water babies, who lived in spirit, but were visible to the eye, having the face of an Indian child and the body of a fish." — According to Indian legend, Hi-na-nu was a wise and noble man, whose spirit was revered by the Indians and to whom they looked for guidance in earthly matters."

Convict Lake, then known to Europeans as Monte Diablo, came to assume its present name in an unusual manner. On September 17, 1871, 29 prisoners, including murderers, horse thieves, train robbers, and other such convicts, escaped from the Nevada State Prison in Carson City, killing one guard and wounding several others. The prisoners split into two groups, one of which was led by convicted murderer Charlie Jones. Jones previously had lived in Mono and Inyo counties and led his group south toward the Mammoth Lakes area. Needing food and supplies, the escaped convicts robbed several people as they went along their way. Crossing the Sierra Nevada mountain range, Jones had hoped to reach the range's western slope, where they would be safe from pursuit. Jones correctly assumed that a Carson City posse was on their trail, but the posse, from Benton, California, led by Deputy Sheriff George Hightower, had given up within a couple of days and turned back. Meanwhile, on horseback, Billy Poor, a mail rider who was delivering mail for his first time, had accidentally encountered the group camped out near Convict Creek, a few miles south from the lake. The convicts naturally assumed that the rider, if permitted to continue on, would reveal their location. Subsequently, Jones captured the man and, with the help of Leandor Morton, killed him, after which they took his horse and clothing and dressed his body in discarded prison clothes.

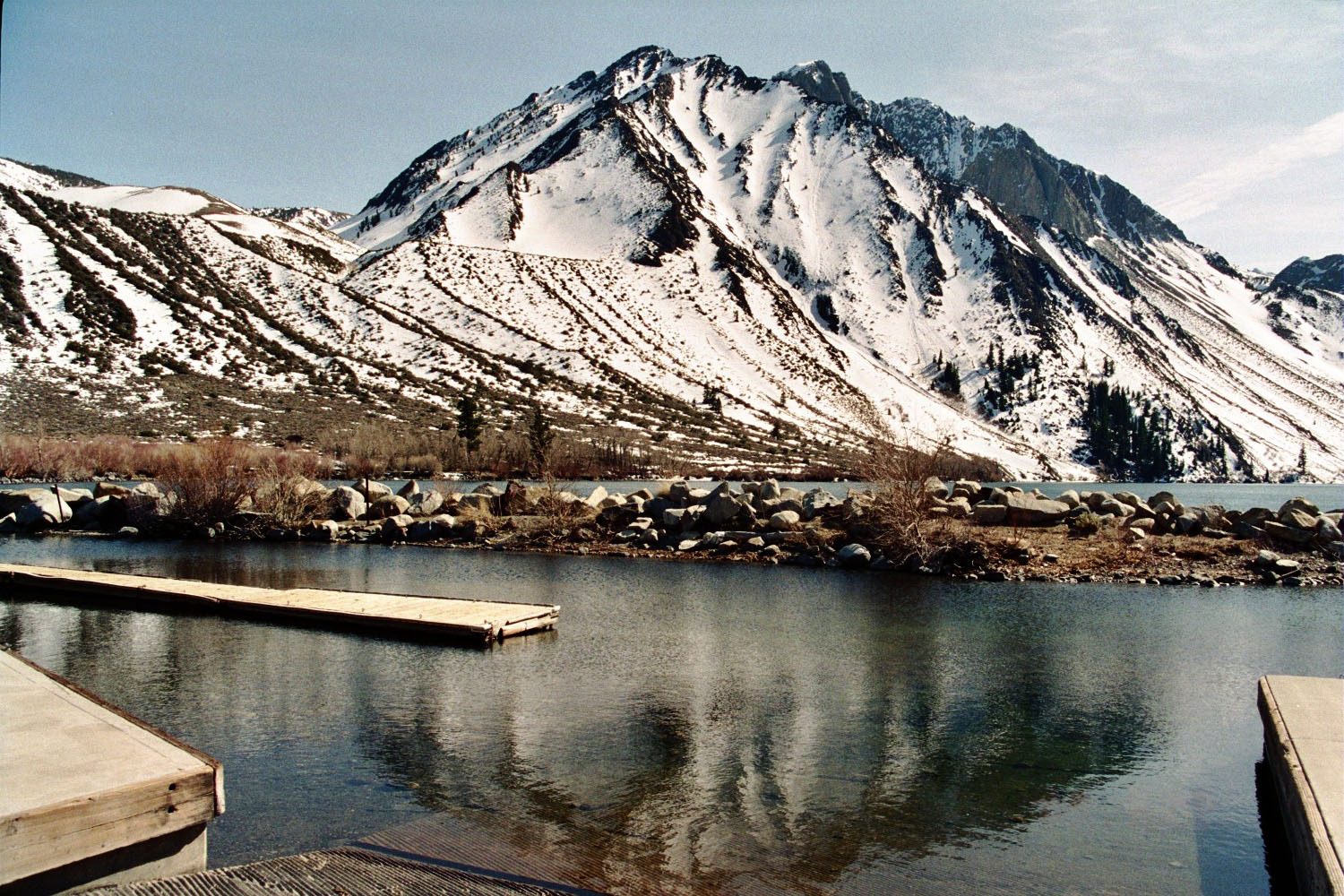
Convict Lake lies in front of Mount Morrison.

Outraged that Poor, a Mono County resident, was murdered, the local community formed their own posse and pursued the convicts. By September 22, 1871, Sheriff George Hightower and Indian deputy Mono Jim led a new posse of 10 men and caught up to the convicts near Monte Diablo Creek. Early on the morning of September 23, Jones headed out for Bishop. Wanting to break off from their group, Jones and another man told the others that they were going to look for food. The four remaining convicts were soon approached by the new posse, and a shootout occurred, leaving Wells Fargo agent Morrison and Mono gunned down. The remaining convicts escaped to be captured later in Round Valley. By November 1, 18 of the 29 original prisoners had been captured. Jones and his partner had avoided the shootout but eventually were captured and executed. The remaining convicts were either killed in the shootout, or captured and lynched on the trip back to the prison. Mount Morrison, the highest peak in the area, was named after the slain Robert Morrison, with its nearby smaller peak named after Mono Jim.

=== 1990 drownings ===
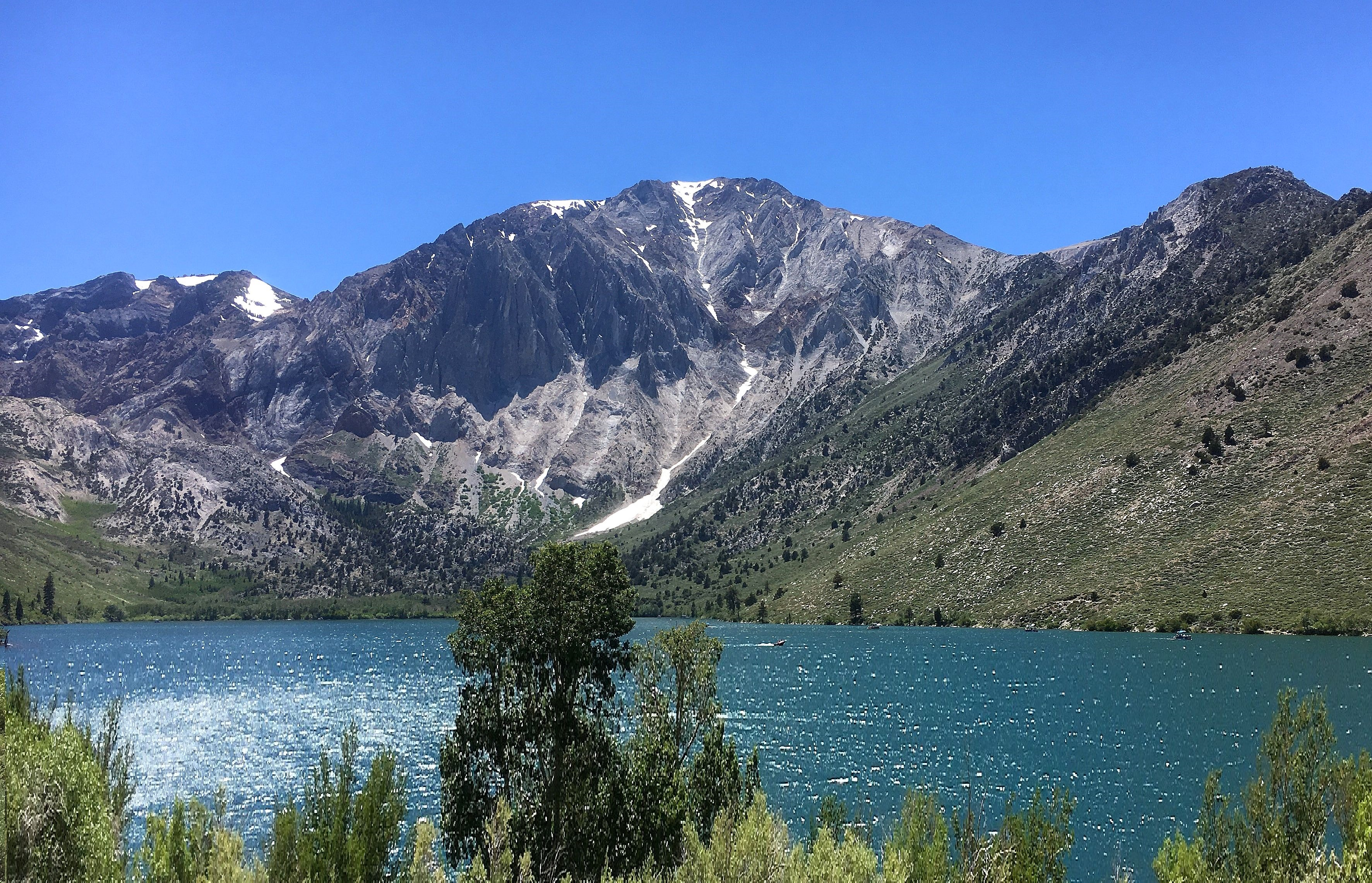
Convict Lake in late June, with its characteristic turquoise-blue color. The snow and ice is still present around the mountain top and melting into a stream that feeds the lake near the base of the mountain.

In February 1990, Convict Lake was the site of a major drowning. Twelve teenagers and two counselors from nearby Camp O'Neal, an institution for juvenile delinquents located near Whitmore Hot Springs, California, were there on a holiday outing. At least four teenagers and both adults fell through the thin ice and into the water. By the time the first rescuer arrived on the scene, only one teenager had been able to pull himself out of the water, but the other teenagers were no longer in sight, having apparently already drowned.

In all, three teenagers from the camp and four would-be rescuers drowned in the freezing water. Another youth and a volunteer fire chief were rescued. Shortly before their deaths, the youths had been advised that the ice was too thin to support their weight but failed to heed the warning.

As a result of the drownings, Camp O'Neal was investigated and subsequently shut down due to findings of abuse and neglect.

== Recreation ==
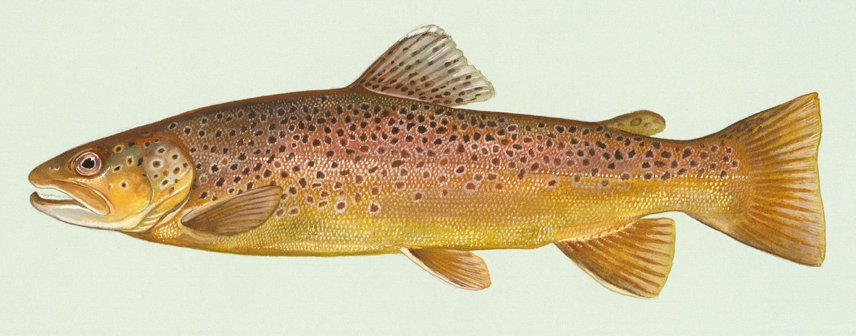
Brown trout common to Convict Lake

Convict Lake is known for its fishing, including rainbow trout, German brown trout, and a species of sucker fish. Due to the high demand of fishing in the lake and stream, the lake is stocked once a week during the summer with rainbow trout, supplied by nearby hatcheries. The biggest fish caught in Convict Lake was a 19 1/2-pound (8.8 kg) German brown, in 1956. More recently, a 14 1/2-pound (6.6 kg) brown trout was caught on October 17, 1993, which also was the biggest trout caught in the Eastern Sierra that year.

A 3-mile (5 km) trail for hiking goes around the lake. Another trail connects the lake to the Sierra Crest. The lakeside trail includes a boardwalk bridge across Convict Creek.

== In popular culture ==
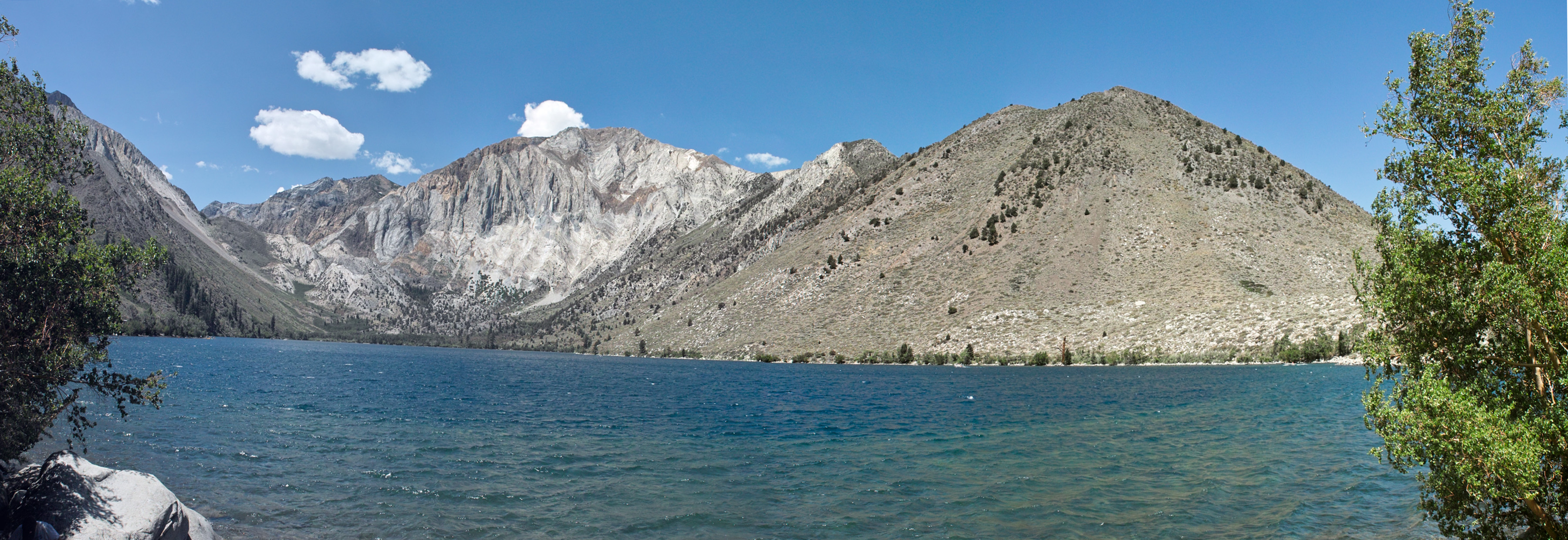
Convict Lake, wide view looking west from the east end of the lake

- The Western film The Secret of Convict Lake (1951) was largely based on the events that occurred at the lake in 1871.
- The Western movie Nevada Smith (1966) was filmed here.
- The Western movie The Border Legion (1924) was filmed here.

== See also ==
- List of lakes in California
- Mammoth Lakes, California

== Bibliography ==
- McKenna, Mike (2019). "How Convict Lake Got its Name". Visit Mammoth.
- "Places to go". Mono County Economic Development, Tourism and Film Commission.
- "Convict Creek Basin". National Geographic.
- "Convict Lake has a colorful history". Tahoe Tribune. October 22, 2008.
- Chalfant, WA (1922). The Story of Inyo. The Author. p. 215.
- "History of the Convict Lake name". ConvictLake.com.
- "Before Convict Lake was a Resort, It Was an Escape Route". Convict Lake Resort. 2019.
- "Convict Lake Loop". Convict Lake Resort. 2010.
- Wilkinson, Tracy; Sappell, Joel (February 21, 1990). "Rescuers Worked Frantically as Victims Slipped Under Ice". Los Angeles Times.
- Grasseschi, Wendilyn (February 17, 2012). "Book on Convict Lake drowning accident both heals, hurts". Mammoth Times. Archived from the original on July 2, 2019.
- Decker, Cathleen; Pate, Kendal (February 20, 1990). "7 Apparently Drown in Freezing Sierra Lake : Tragedy: Witnesses describe futile efforts to save three teen-agers on a holiday skating party. Four other victims were trying to save them". Los Angeles Times.
- Schneider, Jerry L. (2016). Western Filming Locations California Book 6. CP Entertainment Books. ISBN 9780692722947.
- Malloy, Betsy (2019). "Convict Lake". Tripsavvy.com. TripSavvy / Dotdash publishing family. Archived from the original on March 24, 2017.
- "Posse Member Robert Morrison". United States Officer Down Memorial Page, Inc.
- The Secret of Convict Lake. Turner Classic Movies, Inc. A Warner Media Company. 2010.
