= Red Slate Mountain =

Summit in the Sierra Nevada, California

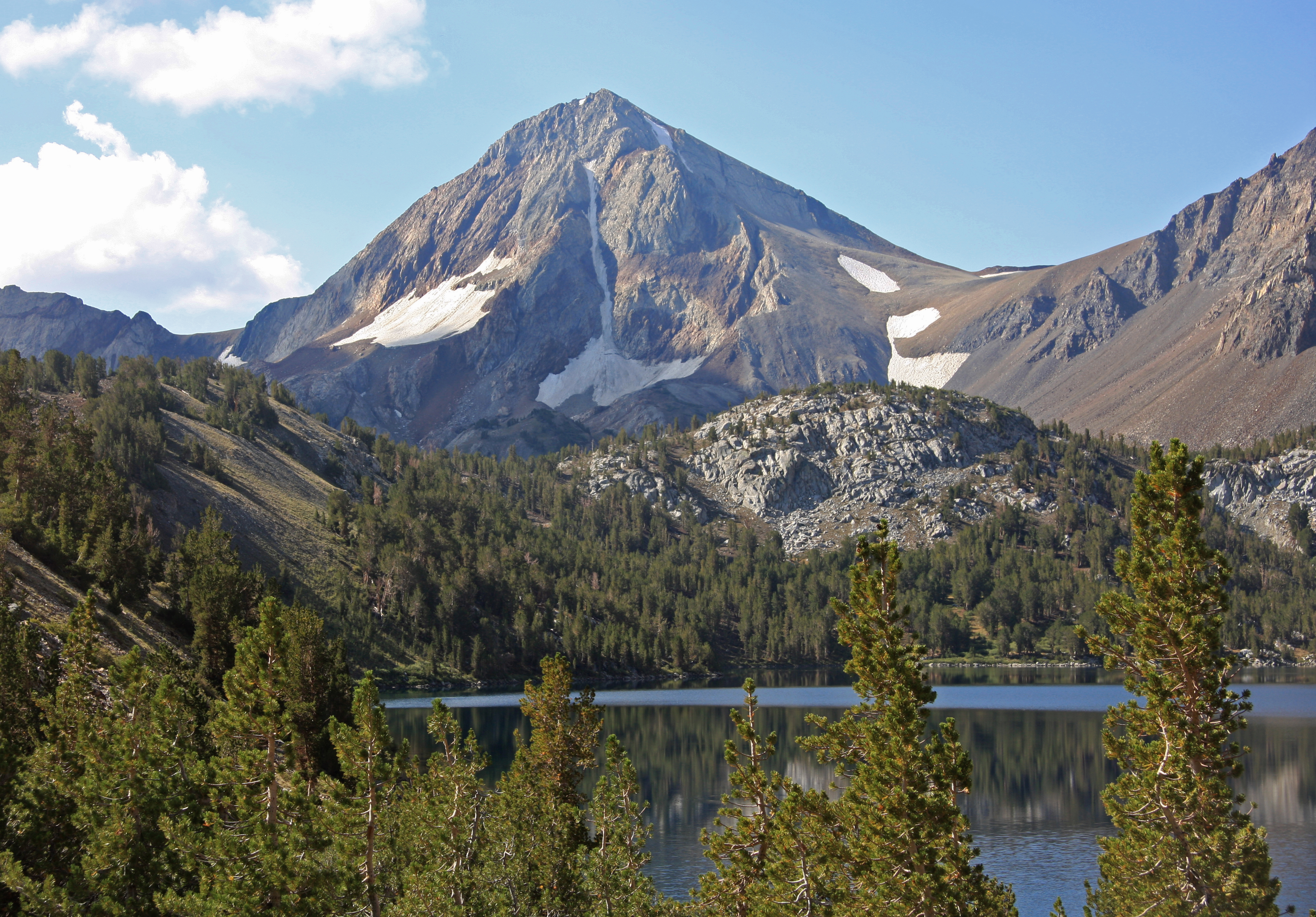
- Red Slate Mountain from Lake Dorothy

Highest point
- Elevation: 13,129+ ft (4,002+ m) NAVD 88
- Prominence: 1,683 ft (513 m)
- Parent peak: Ruby Peak
- Listing: North America highest peaks 122nd; US highest major peaks 104th; California highest major peaks 16th; Western States Climbers Star peak
- Coordinates: 37°30′27″N 118°52′09″W

Geography
- Location within California Location within the United States
- Location: Fresno / Mono counties, California, U.S.
- Parent range: Sierra Nevada
- Topo map: USGS Convict Lake

Geology
- Rock age: Paleozoic
- Mountain type: Metamorphic rock

Climbing
- First ascent: 1898 by Joseph N. LeConte and Clarence L. Cory
- Easiest route: Scramble, class 1 & 2

Red Slate Mountain is a summit in the Sierra Nevada. It lies along the Sierra Crest that divides Fresno County from Mono County, California.

Red Slate Mountain can be reached by scrambling either from McGee Pass, or starting from Bighorn Lake.

The area to the north of Red Slate Mountain is among the most seismically active in California which is associated with the Long Valley Caldera.

Red Slate Mountain was named by the California Geological Survey, in 1873. However, it is not clear whether the survey meant to name this peak, or Red and White Mountain.

== Climate ==
Climate data for Red Slate Mountain 37.5078 N, 118.8700 W, Elevation: 12,300 ft (3,749 m) (1991–2020 normals)
Month	Jan	Feb	Mar	Apr	May	Jun	Jul	Aug	Sep	Oct	Nov	Dec	Year
Mean daily maximum °F (°C)	29.8 (−1.2)	28.1 (−2.2)	31.0 (−0.6)	35.2 (1.8)	42.8 (6.0)	52.6 (11.4)	59.8 (15.4)	59.3 (15.2)	53.9 (12.2)	45.3 (7.4)	35.8 (2.1)	29.4 (−1.4)	41.9 (5.5)
Daily mean °F (°C)	20.3 (−6.5)	17.6 (−8.0)	20.0 (−6.7)	23.4 (−4.8)	31.1 (−0.5)	40.3 (4.6)	47.2 (8.4)	46.5 (8.1)	40.9 (4.9)	33.9 (1.1)	25.4 (−3.7)	19.6 (−6.9)	30.5 (−0.8)
Mean daily minimum °F (°C)	10.8 (−11.8)	7.1 (−13.8)	9.0 (−12.8)	11.5 (−11.4)	19.4 (−7.0)	28.0 (−2.2)	34.5 (1.4)	33.8 (1.0)	27.9 (−2.3)	22.6 (−5.2)	15.1 (−9.4)	9.8 (−12.3)	19.1 (−7.2)
Average precipitation inches (mm)	10.97 (279)	9.05 (230)	8.01 (203)	4.91 (125)	2.67 (68)	0.71 (18)	0.44 (11)	0.31 (7.9)	0.45 (11)	2.44 (62)	3.42 (87)	9.62 (244)	53 (1,345.9)
Source: PRISM Climate Group

== See also ==
- List of mountain peaks of California
