= Bristlecone (disambiguation) =

Bristlecone may refer to:

- Bristlecone pine, three species of pine tree:
  - Pinus longaeva, the Great Basin bristlecone pine, intermountain bristlecone pine, or western bristlecone pine
  - Pinus aristata, the Rocky Mountain bristlecone pine or Colorado bristlecone pine
  - Pinus balfouriana, the foxtail pine
- Abies bracteata, the bristlecone fir or Santa Lucia fir
