= Hickory pine =

List of plants with the same or similar names

Hickory pine is an alternate common name of two species of plant:

- Pinus aristata, Rocky Mountain bristlecone pine from the western US
- Pinus pungens, Table mountain pine from the eastern US
