= Cottonwood Creek (Inyo County, California) =

Creek in the White Mountains of eastern California

Physical characteristics
- Source
  - coordinates: 37.572°N 118.227°W
- Length: 21.5 mi (34.6 km)

National Wild and Scenic Rivers System
- Type: Wild, Recreational
- Designated: March 30, 2009

Cottonwood Creek originates in the Ancient Bristlecone Pine Forests of the White Mountains of eastern California. The creek flows eastward from below the 14,000-foot (4,300 m) alpine crest of the White Mountains and descends through groves of bristlecone pine, aspen and mountain mahogany, then a woodland of pinyon pine and juniper, and finally into sagebrush as the stream ends in endorheic Fish Lake Valley which is one of the contiguous collection of inward-draining basins that make up the Great Basin.

Cottonwood Creek has no native fish, however its North Fork is a refuge for the threatened Paiute cutthroat trout, one of the rarest trout in North America. This subspecies was transplanted from its very limited native range, upper Silver King Creek in the Carson River basin. The remainder of the stream hosts (originally) transplanted brook, brown and rainbow trout. A riparian willow and cottonwood habitat supports protected bird species such as the Yellow warbler, Yellow-breasted chat, Prairie falcon, and Cooper's hawk.

The river is managed by the Bureau of Land Management.
