= Tony King (artist) =

American painter (born 1944)

Tony King (born 1944) is an American abstract expressionist painter He is notable for pictures of Bristlecone pines.
