= Methuselah (pine tree) =

Bristlecone pine tree in the White Mountains, California

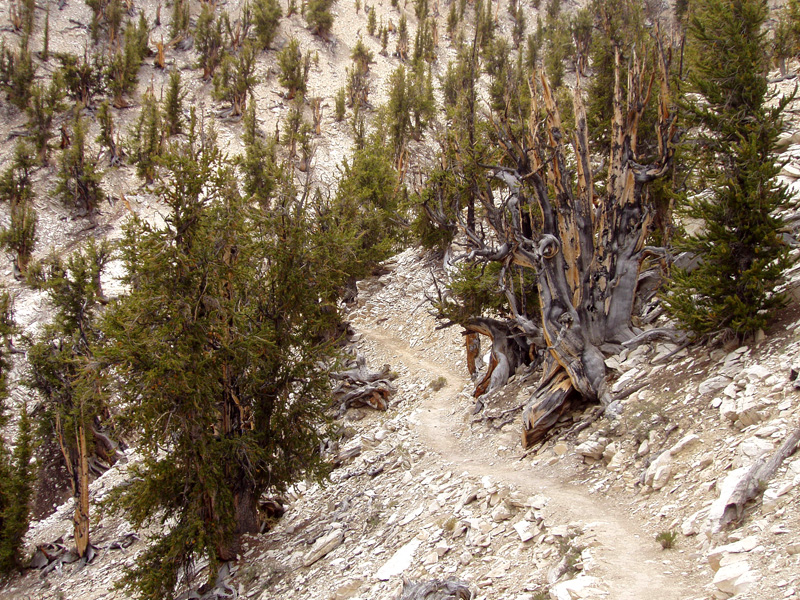
- The Methuselah Grove
- Interactive map of Methuselah
- Species: Great Basin bristlecone pine (Pinus longaeva)
- Location: Ancient Bristlecone Pine Forest, in the White Mountains, Inyo County, California
- Coordinates: 37°22′46″N 118°09′42″W
- Date seeded: c. 2833 BC (age 4857–4858)
- Custodian: United States Forest Service

Methuselah is a 4,858-year-old Great Basin bristlecone pine (Pinus longaeva) tree growing high in the White Mountains of Inyo County in eastern California. It is recognized as the non-clonal tree with the greatest confirmed age in the world. Its old age is a result of harsh weather and a lack of nutrients, which slow down the decaying process. The tree's name refers to the biblical patriarch Methuselah, who is said to have reached 969 years of age before his death, thus becoming synonymous with longevity or old age in many European languages including English.

== Geography ==
Methuselah is located between 2,900 and 3,000 m (9,500 and 9,800 ft) above sea level in the "Methuselah Grove" in the Ancient Bristlecone Pine Forest within the Inyo National Forest. The United States Forest Service does not disclose its exact location, although the tree's location is now widely known and available on the internet following a high-profile leak in 2021 after photos of the exact tree were found in a National Geographic article as well as its appearance in a documentary. The tree's location was withheld for years out of fear the tree would be damaged.

== Status as oldest known tree ==
The claim that Methuselah is the oldest known tree is controversial.

Methuselah was 4,789 years old when sampled in 1957 by Edmund Schulman and Tom Harlan, with an estimated germination date of 2833 BC.

Dendrochronologist Matthew Salzer of the University of Arizona has been unable to reproduce Schulman's age estimate, due to a missing core. Salzer's estimate is approximately 4,669 years old.

=== Other bristlecones ===
Another bristlecone specimen, WPN-114, nicknamed "Prometheus", was more than 4,862 years old when cut down in 1964, with an estimated germination date of 2880 BC. A dendrochronology, based on these trees and other bristlecone pine samples, extends back to about 9000 BC, albeit with a single gap of about 500 years.

An older bristlecone pine was reportedly discovered by Tom Harlan in 2009, based on a sample core collected in 1957. According to Harlan, the tree was 5,062 years old and still living in 2010. Neither the tree nor the sample core could be located after Harlan's death in 2013.

=== Non-bristlecones ===
The Alerce Milenario in Chile was estimated in 2022 to be over 5000 years old, but broad scientific consensus has not been reached on its age.

The Llangernyw Yew in Wales (2,000–5,000 years old) and the Fortingall Yew in Scotland (2,000–9,000 years old) have some age estimates exceeding that of Methuselah, though yews are notoriously hard to date and newer studies indicate younger ages of 2,000–3,000 years old.

=== Clonal organisms ===
Other, longer-lived organisms are clonal colonies, such as a quaking aspen (Populus tremuloides) colony named "Pando" in the Fishlake National Forest in south-central Utah that has been estimated to be 80,000 years old, although precise estimates of clonal organisms such as this aspen colony are impossible with current technologies, and other scientific attempts to age Pando have estimated it may be much younger; the 11,700-year-old creosote bush (Larrea tridentata) colony, named "King Clone", in the Mojave Desert near the Lucerne Valley in California; and the 9,500-year-old Norway spruce (Picea abies) colony named "Old Tjikko" in Sweden.

== See also ==
- List of individual trees
- List of oldest trees
