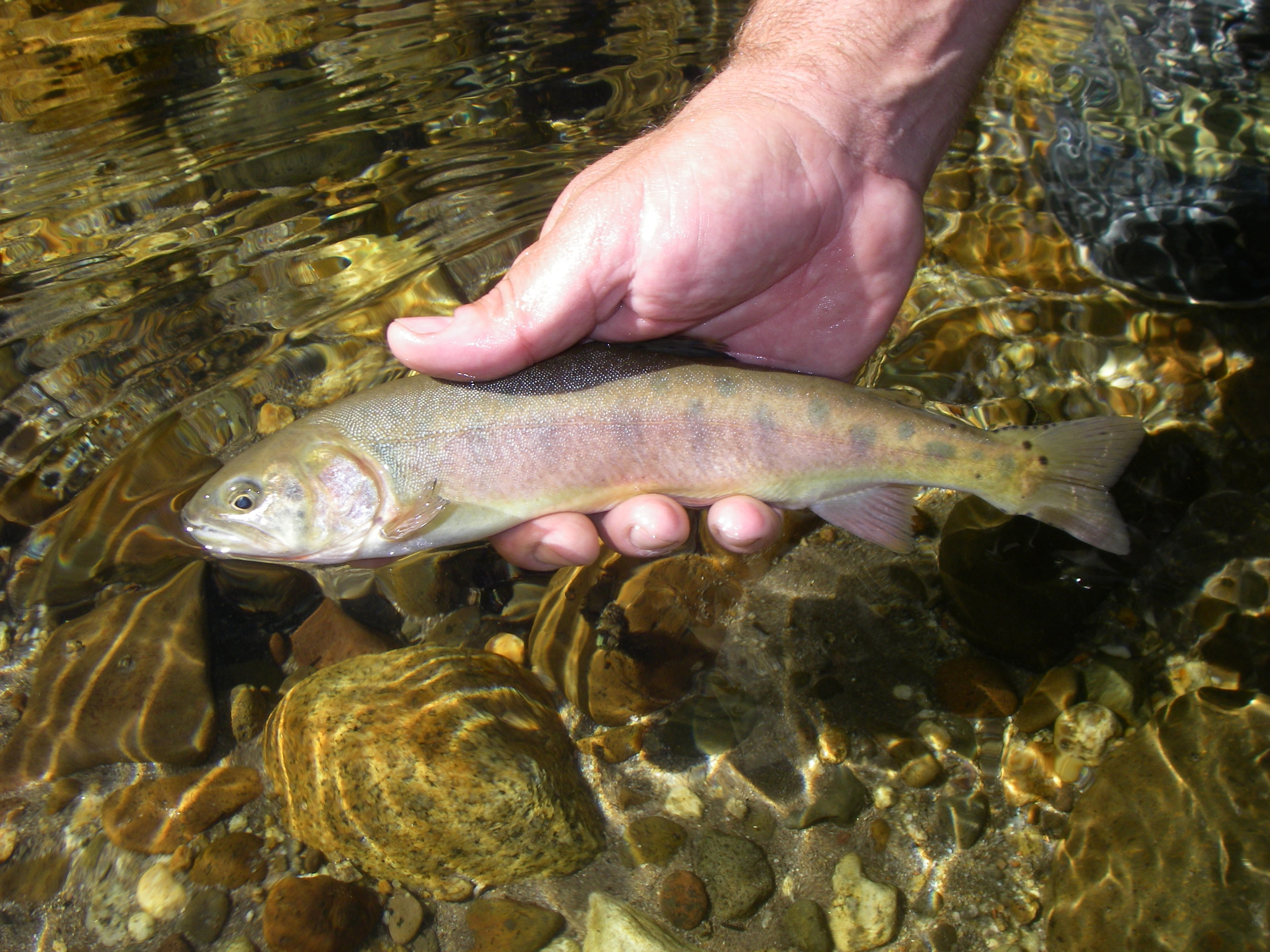

Conservation status
- Critically Imperiled (NatureServe)

- Threatened (ESA)

Scientific classification
- Kingdom: Animalia
- Phylum: Chordata
- Class: Actinopterygii
- Order: Salmoniformes
- Family: Salmonidae
- Genus: Oncorhynchus
- Species: O. henshawi
- Subspecies: O. h. seleniris

Trinomial name
- Oncorhynchus henshawi seleniris (Snyder, 1933)

= Paiute cutthroat trout =

Subspecies of fish

Paiute cutthroat trout (Oncorhynchus henshawi seleniris) are a subspecies of Lahontan cutthroat trout. In 2023 the American Fisheries Society Common and Scientific Names of Fishes from the United States, Canada, and Mexico, 8th edition reclassified all Cutthroat Trout from one species (formerly, Oncorhynchus clarkii) into four distinct species: Coastal, Lahontan, Westslope, and Rocky Mountain Cutthroat Trout. The Paiute Cutthroat retained their trinomial designation as a subspecies (seleniris), but as a subspecies of the Lahontan Cutthroat Trout (Oncorhynchus henshawi). Paiute Cutthroat are native only to Silver King Creek, a headwater tributary of the Carson River in the Sierra Nevada, in California. This subspecies is named after the indigenous Northern Paiute peoples.

Paiute cutthroat trout are endemic to and protected within the Carson Ranger District of the Humboldt-Toiyabe National Forest. The Carson River lies within the Great Basin interior drainage system, within the historic range of Lahontan cutthroat trout (Oncorhynchus henshawi).

The biggest threats facing Paiute cutthroats include hybridization, nonnative fish, livestock grazing, and habitat fragmentation. Since most Paiute cutthroats are completely isolated, there is no genetic flow causing inbreeding, which leads to accelerated levels of extinction.

== Natural history ==
Though the Lahontan cutthroats and the Paiute cutthroats, are very similar subspecies, they are genetic distinctions between the two, as is seen through their spots on their body or lack thereof for the Paiute cutthroats. It is believed that the Paiute cutthroats separated from the Lahontan cutthroats around 5–8,000 years ago from the East Fork Carson River population, which became isolated in Silver King Creek above Silver King Canyon Gorge after erosion made the gorge impassable to trout swimming upstream.

The upstream population then adapted to local conditions independent of the larger population below that had evolved in pluvial Lake Lahontan during the Pleistocene. Although Lahontan cutthroats are heavily spotted, the isolated sub-population lost virtually all spotting, perhaps because spots made fish more visible and susceptible to predation in the ultra-clear and shallow mountain stream. Paiute cutthroats are also notable for a purple coloration, whereas Lahontan cutthroats have bronze coloration. The Paiute strain must have adapted to a diet mainly of insects and become less migratory since juvenile fish swimming downstream in search of larger waters would have passed below downstream barriers and left the isolated gene pool.

== Habitat ==
Similar to other salmonids, Paiute cutthroats require clear, cold, and oxygenated waters and stream pools with an abundance of vegetation for reproduction purposes and for refuge from the winter.

Historically, Paiute cutthroats occupied only 17.8 km of stream space in the Silver King Creek drainage from the Llewellyn Falls to the Silver King Canyon. During this time, they were also found in three tributaries: Tamarack Creek, Tamarack Lake Creek, and the lower parts of Coyote Valley Creek.

Now, Paiute cutthroats occupy 37.8 km of stream space in five different drainages. The Silver King Creek Drainage is found in the Carson-Iceberg Wilderness where the Paiute cutthroats occupy 11.9 km of stream space, including the middle portion of the Silver King Creek which is its natural historical range. Nonnative rainbow trout occupied this space until they were removed between 2013 and 2015 with piscicide. On September 18, 2019, 30 Paiute cutthroats were translocated there from Coyote Creek, marking the first time since the 1900s that they were in their historical range.

Aside from the Silver King Creek Drainage, Paiute cutthroats are found in the White Mountains Wilderness (North Fork Cottonwood Creek, Cabin Creek, and Leidy Creek), the Ansel Adams Wilderness (Stairway Creek), and the John Muir Wilderness (Sharktooth Creek).

== Conservation ==
Basque sheepherders began grazing sheep along upper Silver King Creek in the 1800s. They noticed the unusual trout and by 1912 had transplanted them above Llewellyn Falls which had originally been the upper limit. This is fortunate because by 1924 hybrids with ordinary Lahontan cutthroat and introduced rainbow trout (cutbows) were found below Llewellyn Falls, either due to ill-considered stocking or barriers in the gorge washing out.

Since the finite and localized population of Paiute cutthroats was vulnerable to forest fire and angling as well as hybridization, relatively unhybridized Paiute cutthroats from upstream were transplanted into virtually all available tributaries of Silver King Creek above the gorge, into Stairway and Sharktooth Creeks to the south in the Sierra Nevada, and into Cottonwood Creek and Cabin Creek in the White Mountains.

The subspecies was listed as an endangered species in 1967. In 1975, its status was upgraded to threatened, a status which it still maintains since the 2020 5-Year Status review.

Subsequent studies have found some degree of hybridization in virtually all populations of Paiute cutthroats, especially between 1930 and 1994 with non-native fish like the California golden trout (Oncorhynchus mykiss aguabonita) and rainbow trout (Oncorhynchus mykiss ssp.). In the early 1990s, the California Department of Fish and Game reduced hybridization by chemically treating stream segments with higher levels of introgression and transplanting Paiute cutthroats from other stream segments thought to be less hybridized. These populations would then be isolated and monitored by the California Department of Fish and Game.

Angling is prohibited in most streams where Paiute cutthroats predominate, however future plans include downstream expansion of Paiute cutthroat range by removing other trout and installing barriers.

Although restoration plans were delayed by lawsuits concerned about the impact of rotenone on other stream inhabitants, the U.S. Fish & Wildlife Service decided in May 2010 to proceed with poisoning to eradicate non-native and hybrid trout in Silver King Creek from Llewellyn Falls downstream to the confluence with Snodgrass Creek and associated tributaries; and to restore Paiute cutthroat trout to its historical range through stocking. When populations are sufficient, the subspecies may be de-listed and limited angling may be permitted.
