= Ancient Bristlecone Pine Forest =

Protected area in Inyo County, California, US

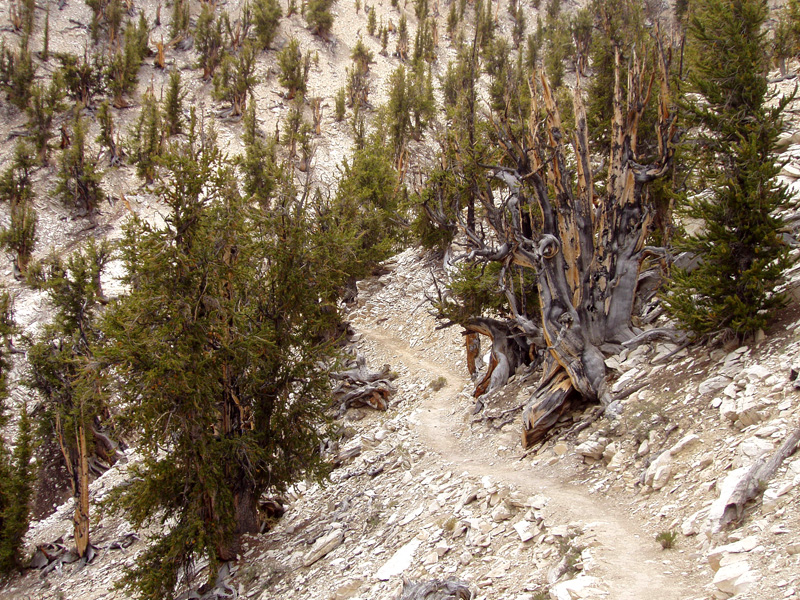
- The Methuselah Grove trail in the Ancient Bristlecone Pine Forest

- Location within California
- Location: White Mountains, Inyo County, California, United States
- Coordinates: 37°23′8.4″N 118°10′43.9″W
- Area: 43.75 sq mi (113.3 km^{2})
- Max. elevation: 3,410 m (11,190 ft)
- Min. elevation: 3,000 m (9,800 ft)
- Administrator: United States Forest Service

The Ancient Bristlecone Pine Forest is a protected area high in the White Mountains in Inyo County in eastern California.

== Geography ==
The forest is east of the Owens Valley, high on the eastern face of the White Mountains in the upper Fish Lake-Soda Spring Watershed, above the northernmost reach of the Mojave Desert into Great Basin ecotone. The forest's mountain habitat is in the Central Basin and Range ecoregion (EPA) and Great Basin montane forests (One Earth). The Patriarch Grove is the source of Cottonwood Creek, a designated Wild and Scenic River.

== Ecology ==
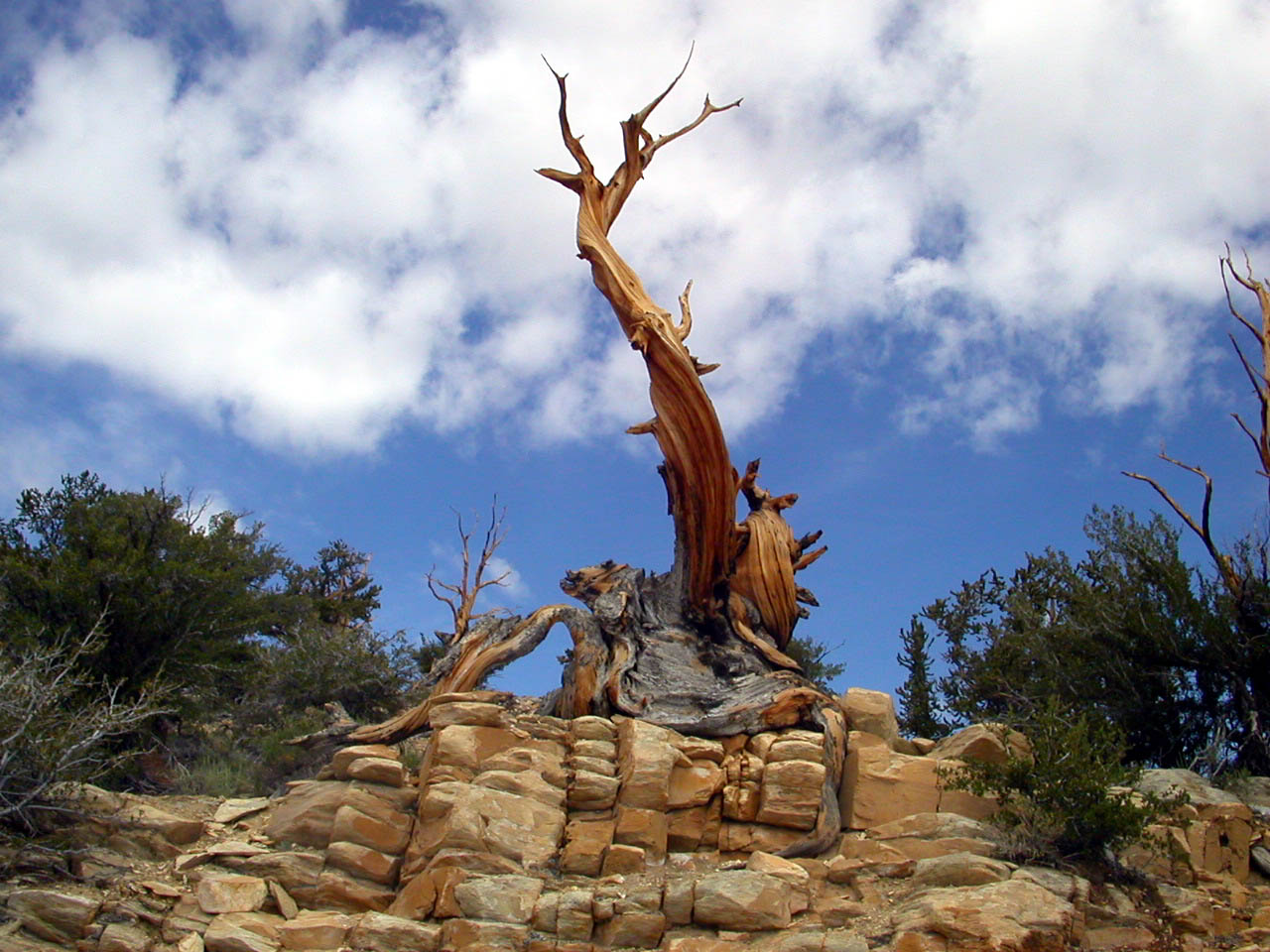
Pinus longaeva – bristlecone pines in the Ancient Bristlecone Pine Forest, White Mountains, California

The Great Basin bristlecone pine (Pinus longaeva) grows between 9,800 and 11,000 feet (3,000–3,400 m) above sea level, in xeric alpine conditions, protected within the Inyo National Forest. The limber pine (Pinus flexilis) also grows in the Ancient Bristlecone Pine Forest.

=== Methuselah ===
The Methuselah Grove in the Ancient Bristlecone Pine Forest is the location of the "Methuselah", a Great Basin bristlecone pine that is 4,857 years old. It is considered to be the world's oldest known and confirmed living non-clonal organism. It was temporarily superseded by a 5,062 year old bristlecone pine discovered in 2010. In May 2017 however, Dr. Peter Brown removed this tree from his database of old trees because the tree and core sample could not be found. "Methuselah" is not marked in the forest, to ensure added protection from vandals.

== Visiting ==
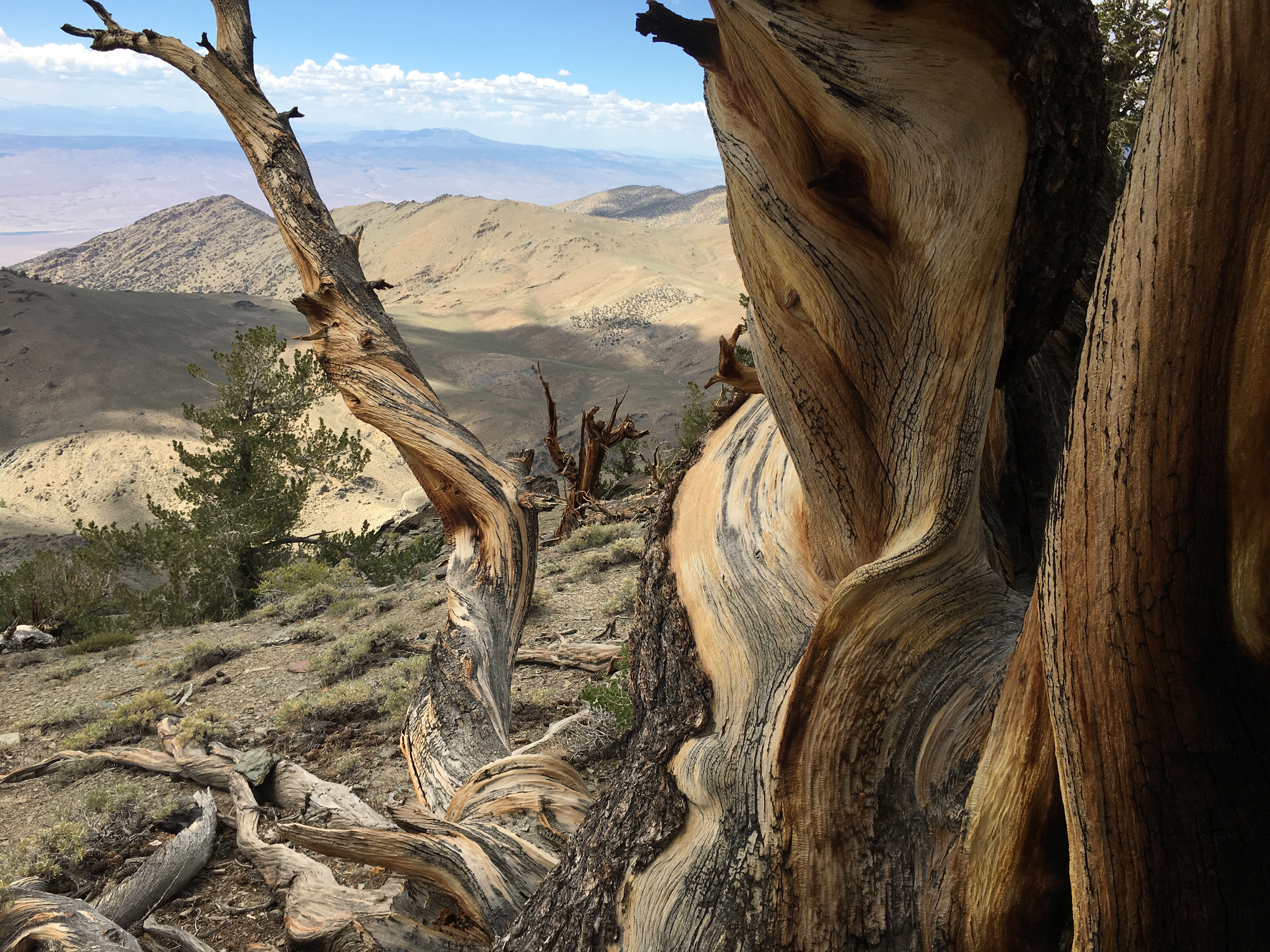
The Schulman and Patriarch groves are located about 30 mi (48 km) from Bishop, California.

The Ancient Bristlecone Pine Forest is generally open from mid-May through the end of November, weather permitting.

- Schulman Grove and Schulman Grove Visitor Center – daily interpretive talks and natural history lectures mid-June through Labor Day, and hiking trails.
- Patriarch Grove – home of the world's largest bristlecone pine, the Patriarch Tree, and a self-guided nature trail.

=== Methuselah Grove trail ===
The Methuselah Grove trail starts from the visitor center at 9,846 feet (3,001 m) and makes a 4.5-mile (7.2 km) loop that includes the side valley of the Methuselah Grove where the oldest tree lives, a high section looking out eastward over Nevada's basin-and-range region, and side trails to old mining sites. Numbered natural-history markers are explained by a booklet. Part of the natural area is old-growth forest and recognized by Old-Growth Forest Network.

== Fire ==
On September 4, 2008, an arsonist set fire to the Schulman Grove Visitor Center and several bristlecone pines. The building and all the exhibits within were destroyed. Activities to rebuild the center began the next day and are now complete.
