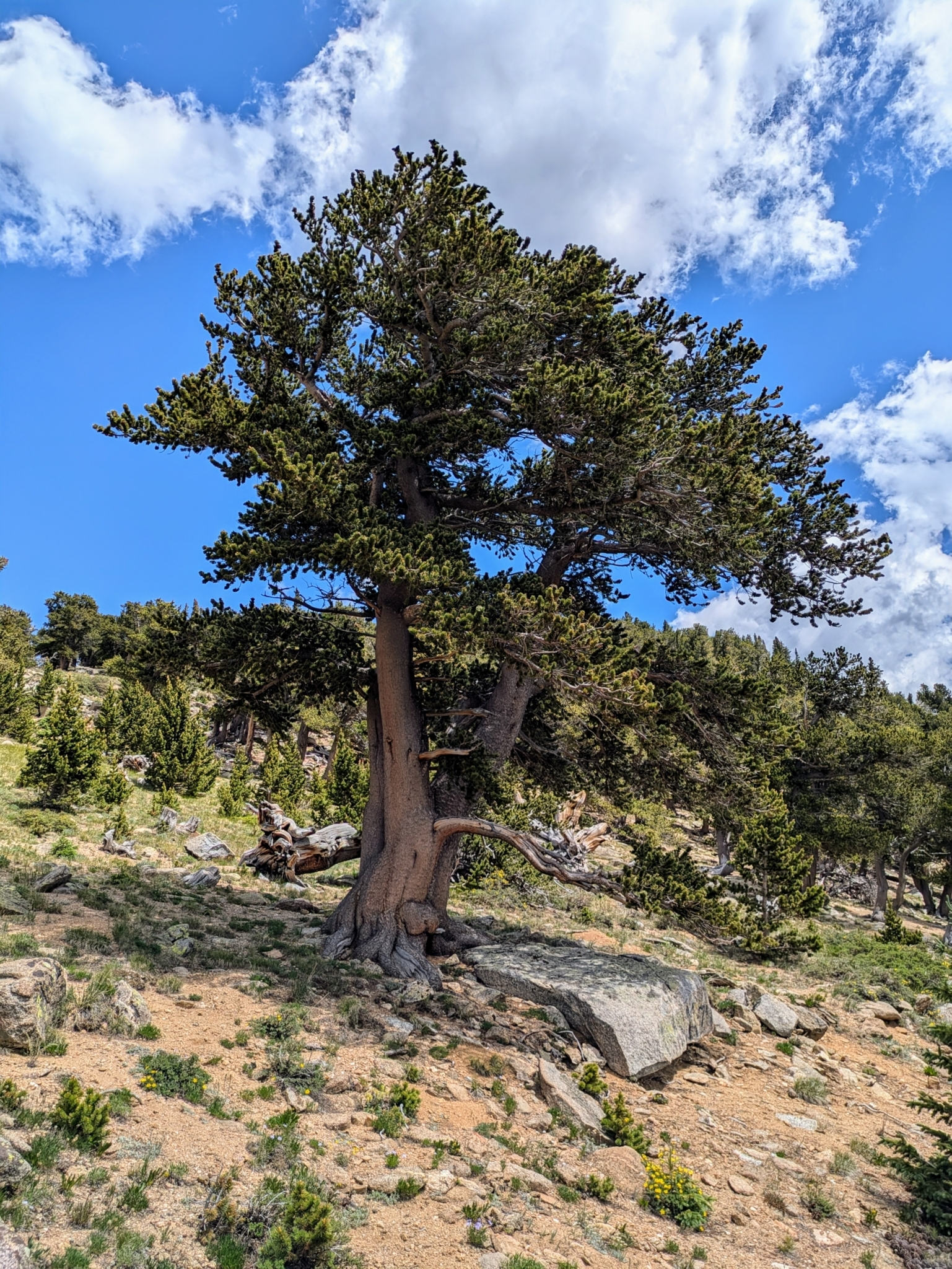
- Pinus aristata on the Mount Blue Sky Scenic Byway

Conservation status
- Least Concern (IUCN 3.1)

- Vulnerable (NatureServe)

Scientific classification
- Kingdom: Plantae
- Clade: Tracheophytes
- Clade: Gymnosperms
- Division: Pinophyta
- Class: Pinopsida
- Order: Pinales
- Family: Pinaceae
- Genus: Pinus
- Subgenus: P. subg. Strobus
- Section: P. sect. Parrya
- Subsection: P. subsect. Balfourianae
- Species: P. aristata

Binomial name
- Pinus aristata Engelm.
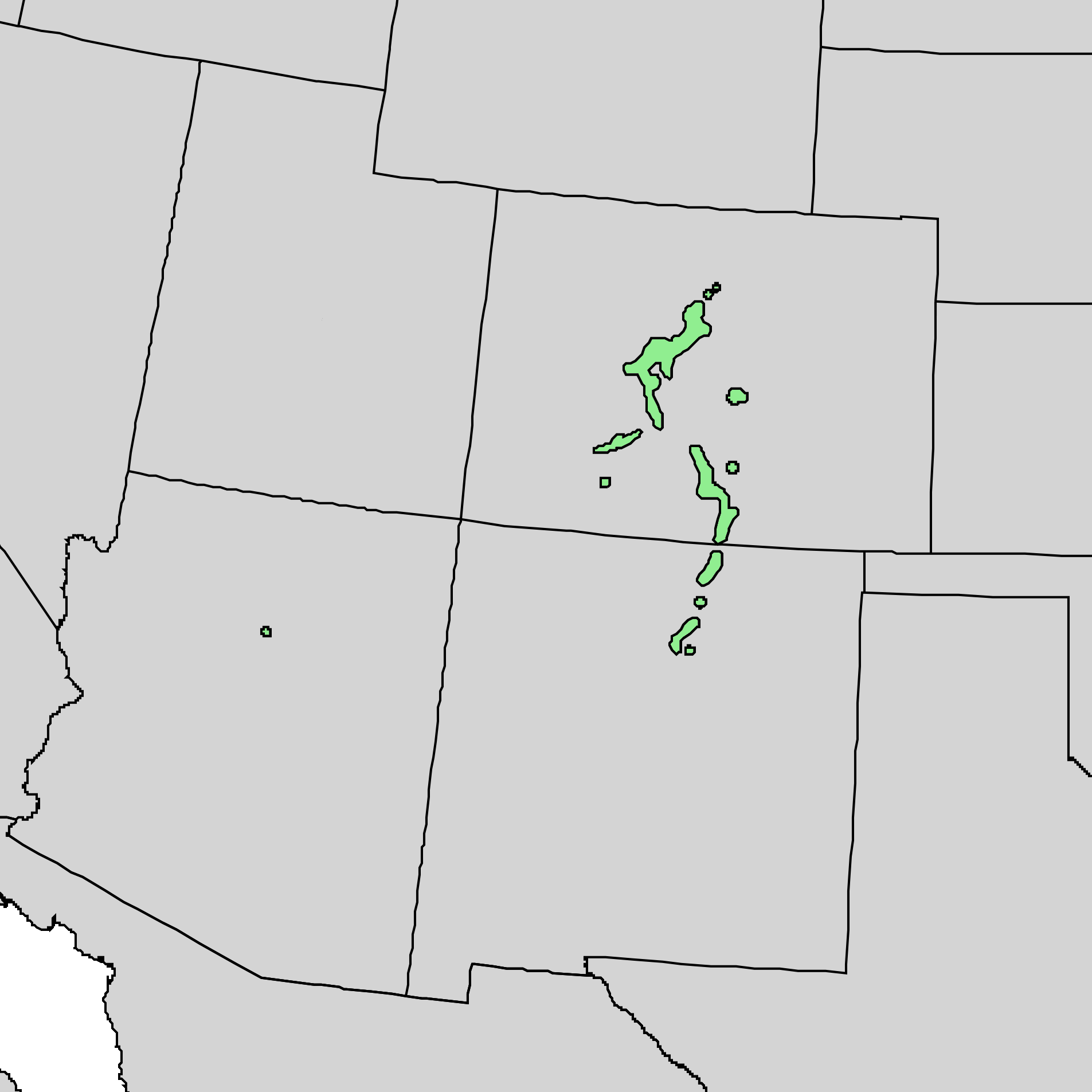

Synonyms
- Pinus balfouriana subsp. aristata (Engelm.) Engelm. (1880); Pinus balfouriana var. aristata (Engelm.) Engelm. (1878)

= Pinus aristata =

North American species of pine tree

Pinus aristata, the Rocky Mountain bristlecone pine or Colorado bristlecone pine is a long-lived species of bristlecone pine tree native to the United States. It is found in the Rocky Mountains in Colorado and northern New Mexico, with an isolated population in the San Francisco Peaks of Arizona. It is found at very high altitudes, from 2,100 to 4,000 meters (6,900 to 13,100 ft) in cold, dry subalpine climate conditions, often at the tree line, although it also forms extensive closed-canopy stands at somewhat lower elevations.

== Description ==
Pinus aristata is a medium-size tree, commonly reaching 15 meters (49 ft) in height and occasionally as much as 20 m (66 ft) in their natural habitat. In favorable conditions they are straight and upright trees, but they become increasingly stunted, short, and twisted the closer they grow to timberline. The crown of the tree is flattened, irregular, or round in shape when fully mature. The trunk can be very substantial, commonly 75 cm (2 ft) and up to 1 m (3.3 ft) in diameter, and tapers very noticeably towards the top. The bark is fairly smooth and white-gray on young trees, but becomes dark and cracked with a scaly texture on old trees. The color of older bark varies from red-brown to gray.

Young trees that are not stunted have evenly spaced whorls of branches. On older trees the branches are crooked and twisting and may be partially dead. Twigs begin as red-brown, but become gray with age. Twigs and very young branches are covered in needles that last for 10 to 17 years, giving them a shaggy bottle brush appearance. The needle like leaves are bundles of five and are 2–4 centimeters long, but usually longer than 3 cm. The fascicle, the base that holds the needles together, breaks down more quickly in Pinus aristata than in Pinus longaeva, giving a more even appearance to its branches. The resin canals in the needles are closer to the surface and not as sturdy, explaining the noticeable white flecks of resin. The botanist Dana K. Bailey described the needles covered in resin as appearing "dandruffy". The small dried droplets are easily mistaken for scale insects. Between the white specks the needles are dark green in color. The buds are egg shaped with a long tapering point (acuminate), about 1 cm in size. New shoots are light orange and may covered in hairs or hairless.

=== Cones ===
The pollen cone is approximately 1 cm in length and may be blueish to red colored. Trees mature enough to produce seed cones are generally about 1.5 meters in height and 20 years of age. Seed cones are dark purple when immature and turn brown as they ripen. At full size they are 6–11 centimeters in length. A seed cone takes two years to fully ripen. Each scale of the cone is tipped with a thin, brittle pickle 4–10 millimeters long. They fall from the tree soon after releasing their seeds. Pinus aristata has seeds that are gray-brown to nearly black in color with darker spots and 5–6 mm long. The seed has an attached papery wing 10–13 mm long. Their mean weight is 25 milligrams, significantly smaller than those of the whitebark pine at 175 mg, but much larger than the 4 mg of lodgepole pine. Large crops of cones are produced only once per century on average.

=== Seedlings ===
The seeds of Pinus aristata easily germinate, with as much as 80% of the seeds being viable. Seeds that are mechanically damaged are colonized and killed by fungus. Each new sprout will have between seven and twelve needle-like seed leaves. The seedlings are quite vulnerable to cold temperatures with all being killed if exposed to temperatures of less than −10 °C (14 °F).

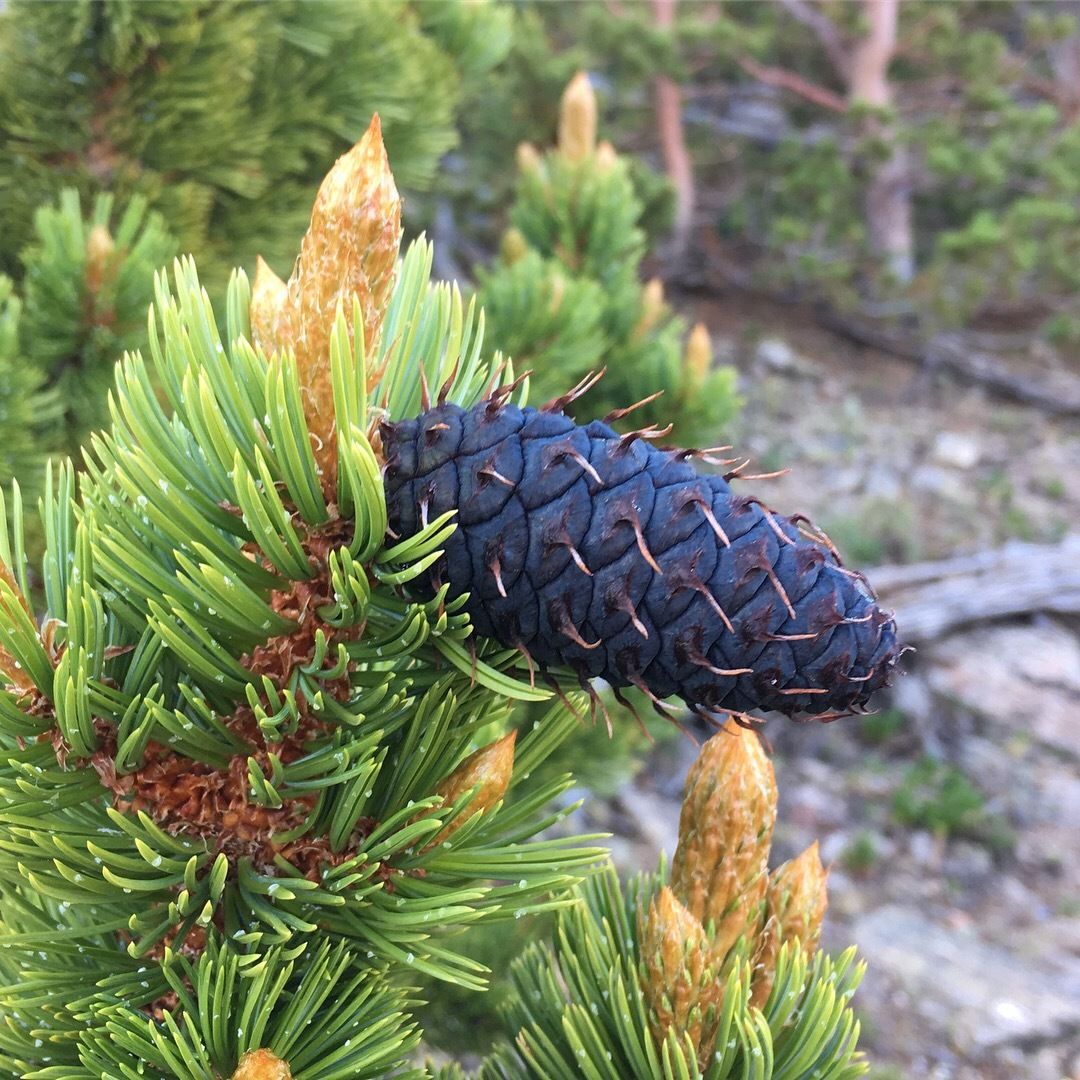
Immature seed cone

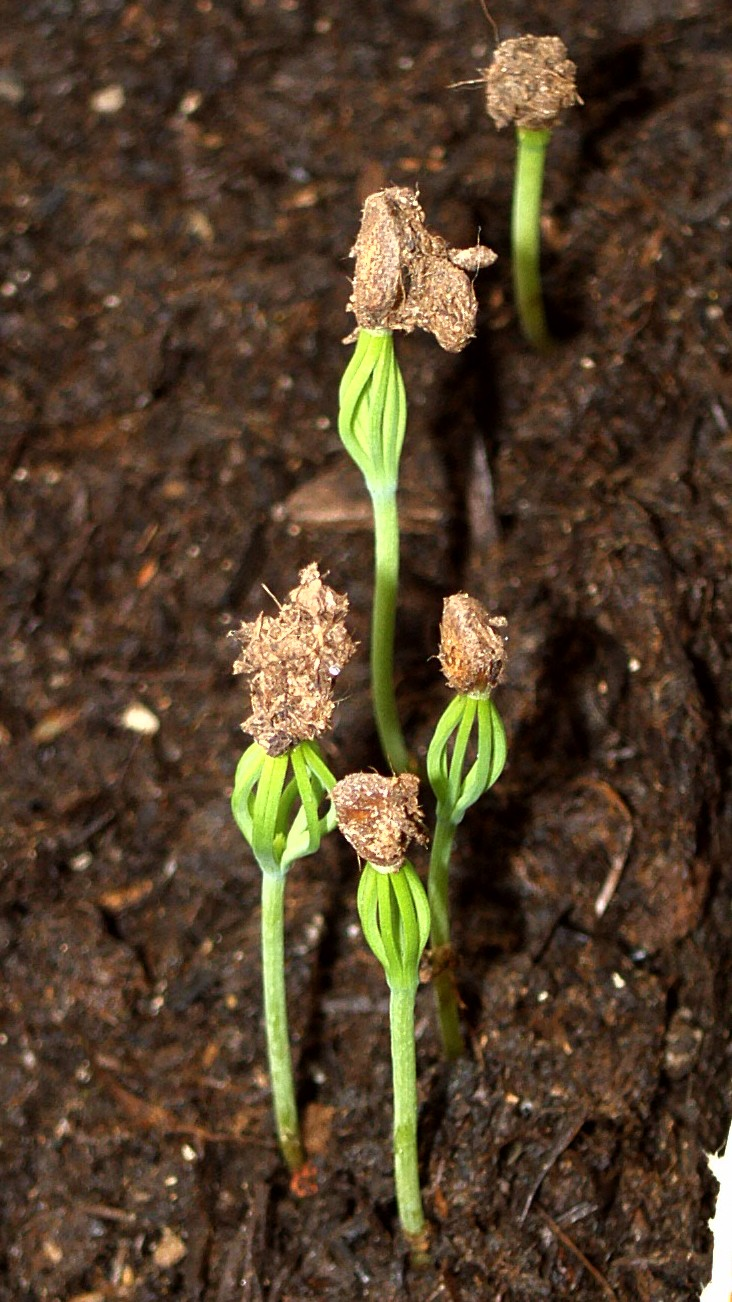
Seedlings, 1 week old

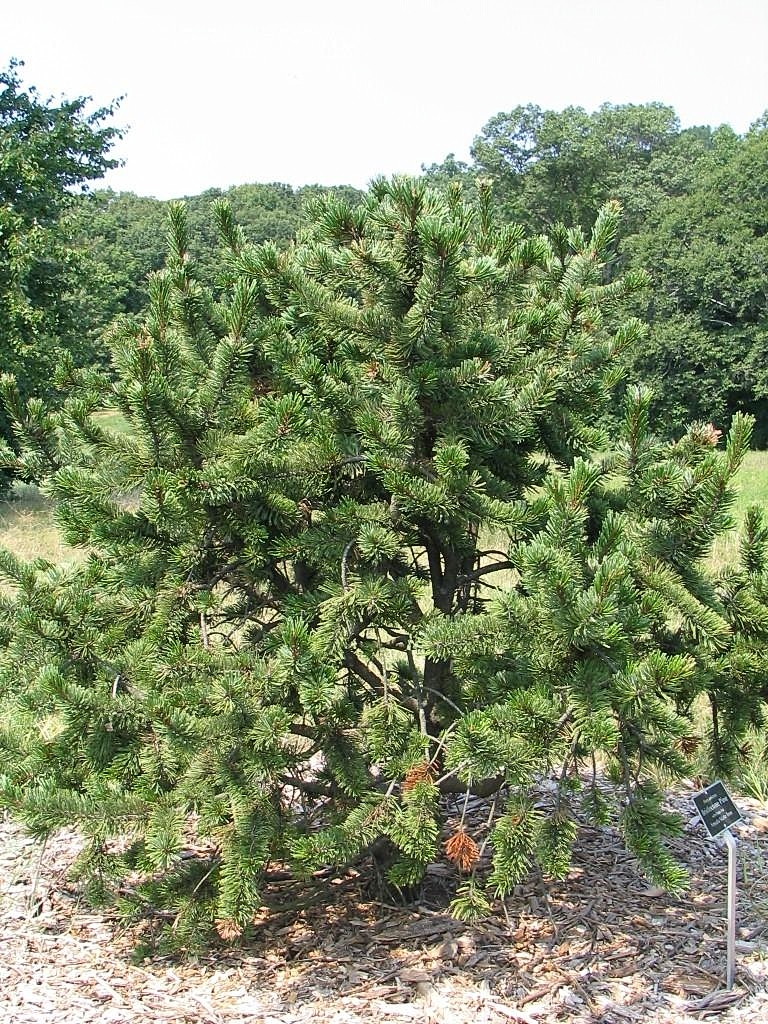
In cultivation

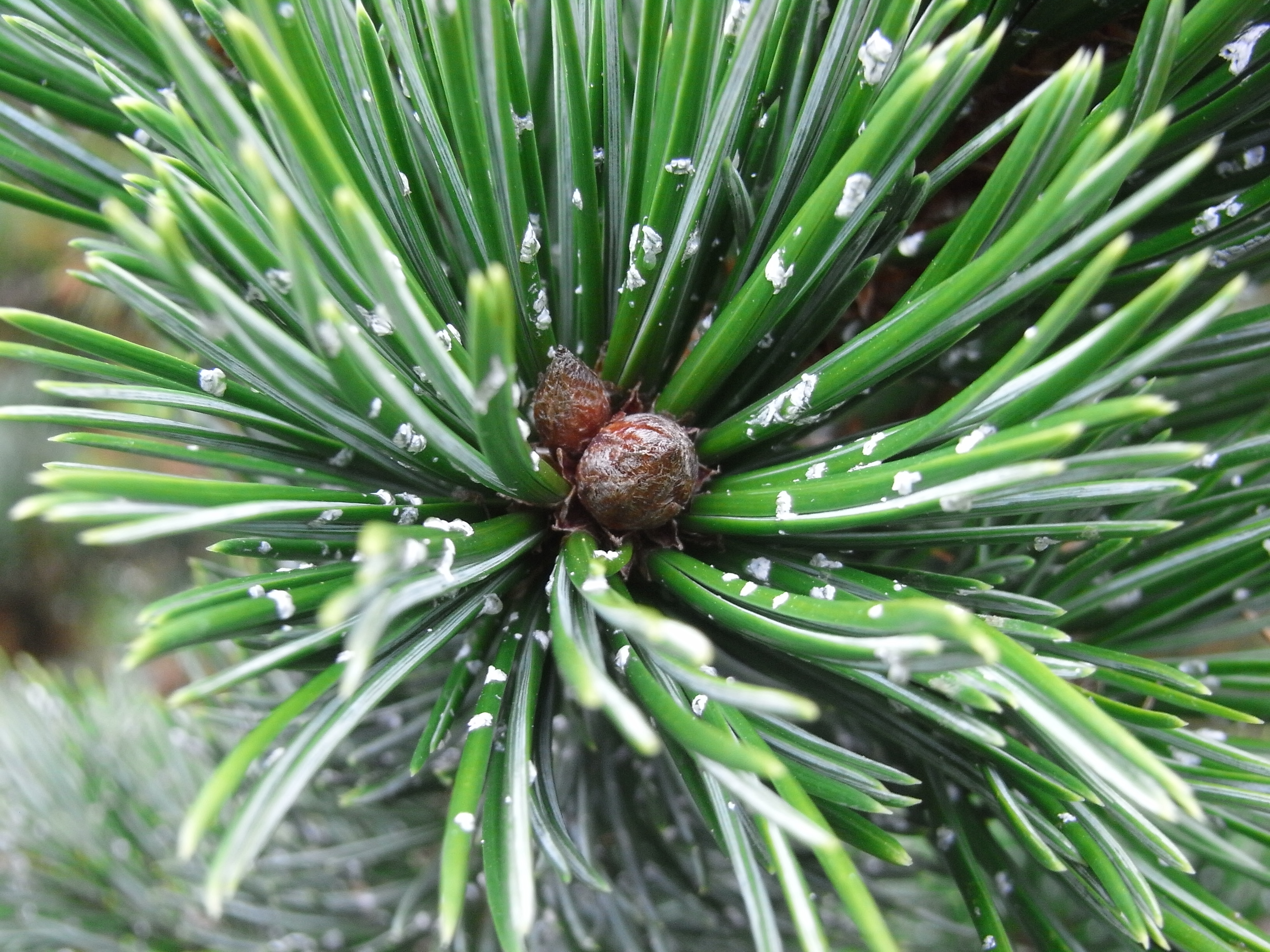
Needles with typical resin flecks

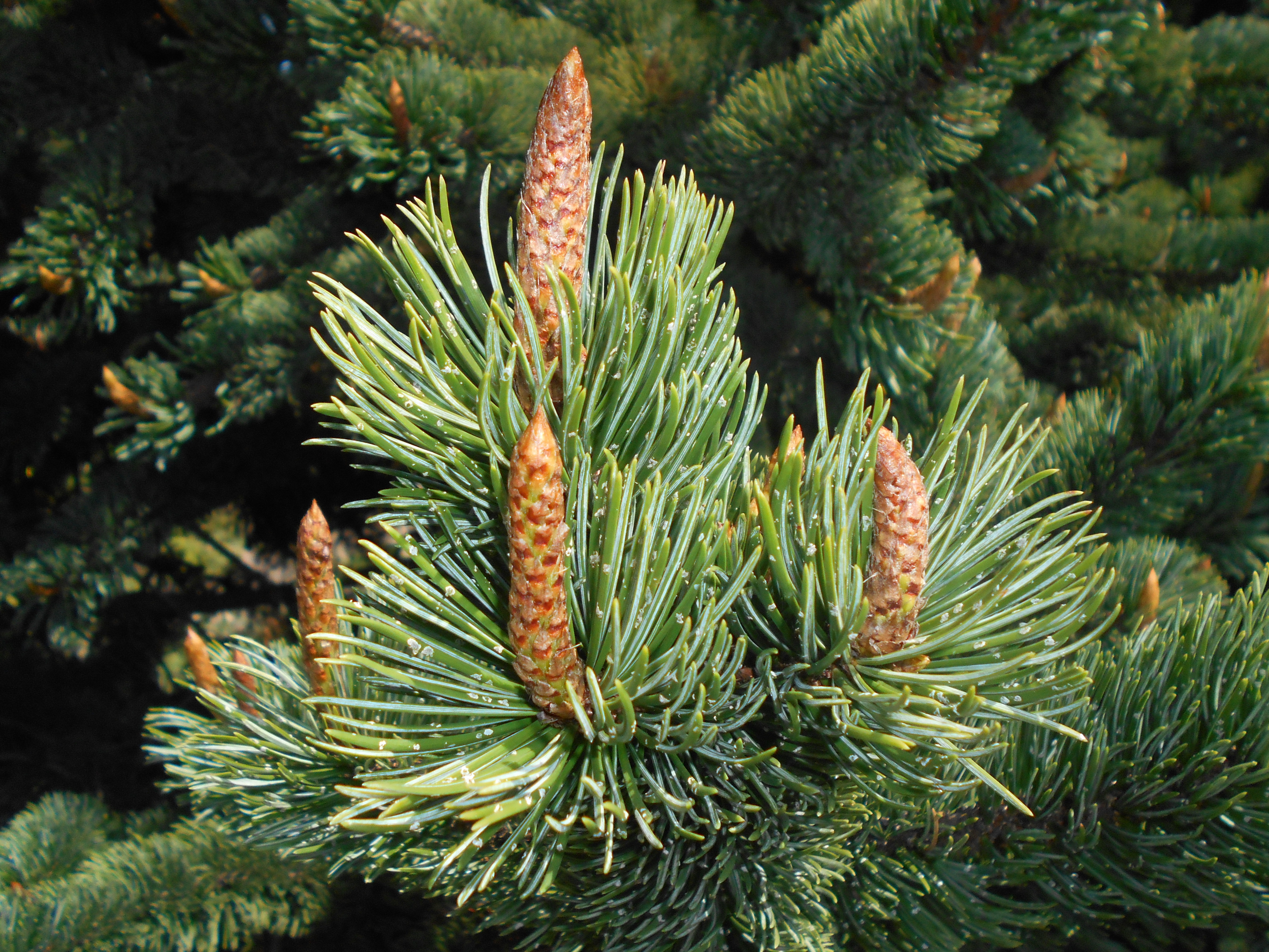
Growing buds

=== Longevity ===
Though they do not obtain the extreme age of the Great Basin bristlecone pines, Colorado bristlecones still reach quite advanced ages. There are 13 trees that are known to be older than 1600 years by reliable dating, including one on Mount Goliath dated to the year 403. Four of these trees exceed 2100 years of age and one is 2467 years old (see Notable trees). Based on size and appearance scientists estimate there are 30 more trees in the same general area older than 1600 years that have not yet had core samples taken. The botanist Aljos Farjon thinks that there may be trees that are older 3000 years of age that have yet to be scientifically scrutinized. At lower elevations in montane habitats where they grow with grasses, ages generally do not exceed 300 years.

The Rocky Mountain bristlecone is known both for having stripes of dead wood on the trunks of older trees and for the extreme lengths of time that dead trees will remain sound. In this it is very much like the Great Basin bristlecone.

== Taxonomy ==
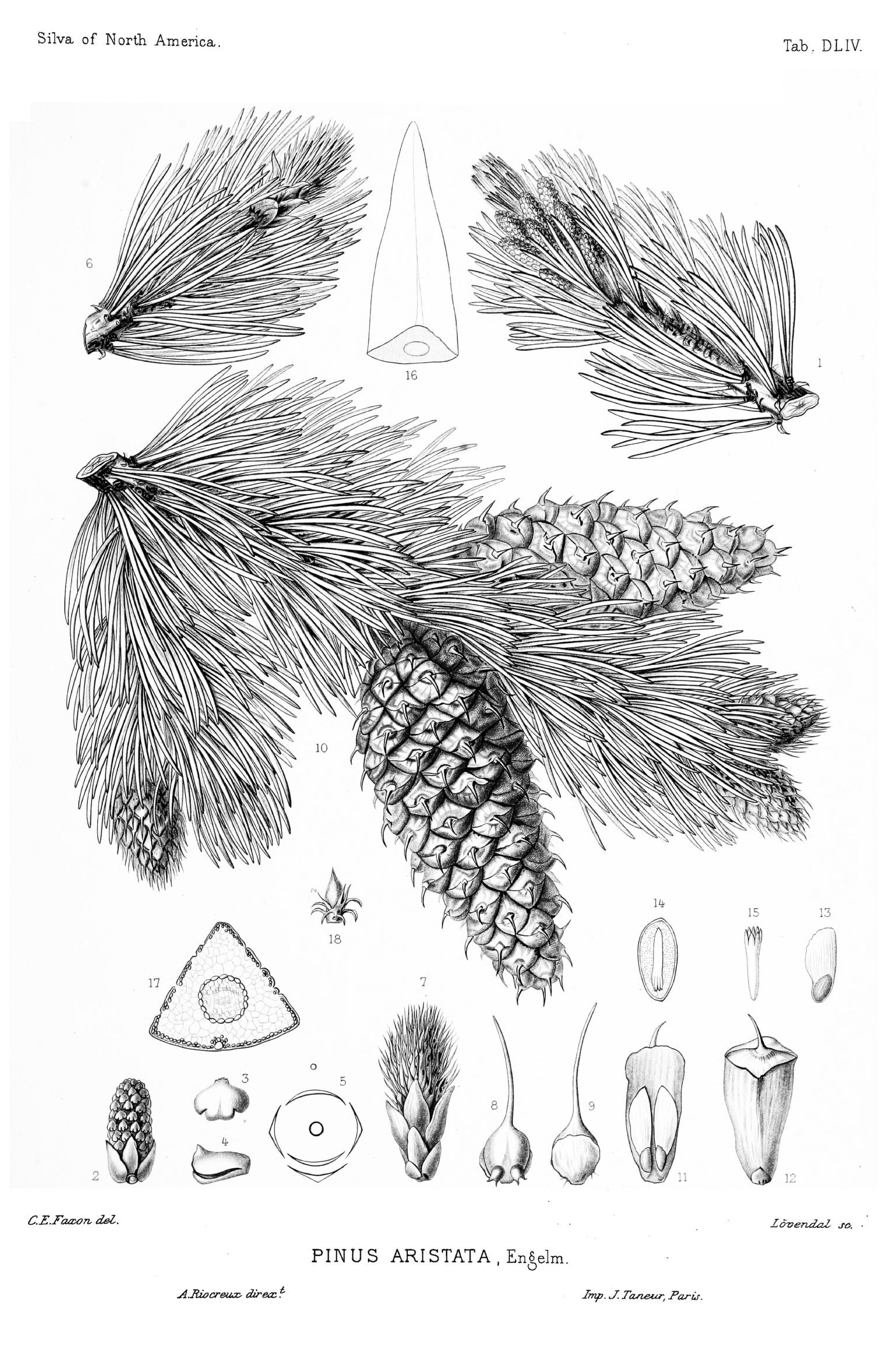
The branches and cones of Pinus aristata as illustrated by Charles Edward Faxon in The Silva of North America

Pinus aristata was scientifically described in 1862 by George Engelmann with its present scientific name. The botanical samples used to describe and name the species were collected in 1861 by Charles Christopher Parry, however the earliest known scientific collection was by Frederick Creuzefeldt in 1853. In 1878 Englemann worked on a reclassification of the taxon as a variety of Pinus balfouriana and in 1880 as a subspecies. This reassessment was initially accepted by botanists such as Charles Sprague Sargent, but was rejected by others such as Edward James Ravenscroft. It is listed as an accepted species with no subspecies by Plants of the World Online, World Flora Online, and World Plants. Prior to work by Dana K. Bailey published in 1971, Pinus longaeva trees growing in California, Nevada, and Utah were not identified as a separate species or subspecies. A distance of 260 kilometers (160 mi) separates the populations of P. aristata from the closest groves of P. longaeva.

=== Names ===
The species name aristata means "bristle" in botanical Latin, a reference to the long points on the ends of the scales of its cones. As the first bristlecone identified, Pinus aristata is still occasionally referred to simply as bristlecone pine, however Pinus longaeva is also sometimes called bristlecone pine in English. To distinguish it from its relative the name Rocky Mountain bristlecone pine has been used since at least 1971 and the similar Colorado bristlecone has been in use since at least 1976. The common name hickory pine is used, most often in Colorado, due to the hardness and density of the wood being like that of a hickory. It is additionally known as foxtail pine and wind timber, but the first of these names is more often applied to Pinus balfouriana.

== Range and habitat ==
The Colorado bristlecone grows in three western US states, Colorado, New Mexico, and Arizona. The Rocky Mountain bristle cone reaches its northern limit at approximately 40 degrees north latitude. They are widely distributed in the Southern Rocky Mountains, but are limited to small areas within its range. The elevation range where it grows is widest, from 2,100 to 4,000 meters (6,900 to 13,100 ft), in the state of Colorado. The Arizona population is only found above 2900 m and only as high as 3700 m. In New Mexico the trees start at a similarly high elevation of 3000 m and have the same maximum as in Arizona.

Rocky Mountain bristlecone will grow in krummholz habitat at the edge of the alpine tundra, where it has the typical dwarfed and gnarled growth of these "crooked woods". Its habitat extends downward into the subalpine forests and even lower in the driest parts of the middle elevations. The bristlecones and limber pines (Pinus flexilis) will grow into full trees at elevations where silver spruces (Picea engelmannii) and subalpine firs (Abies lasiocarpa) are reduced to stunted, ground hugging shrubs. Their greater tolerance of dry conditions is what enables them to grow more successfully in challenging mountain habitats.

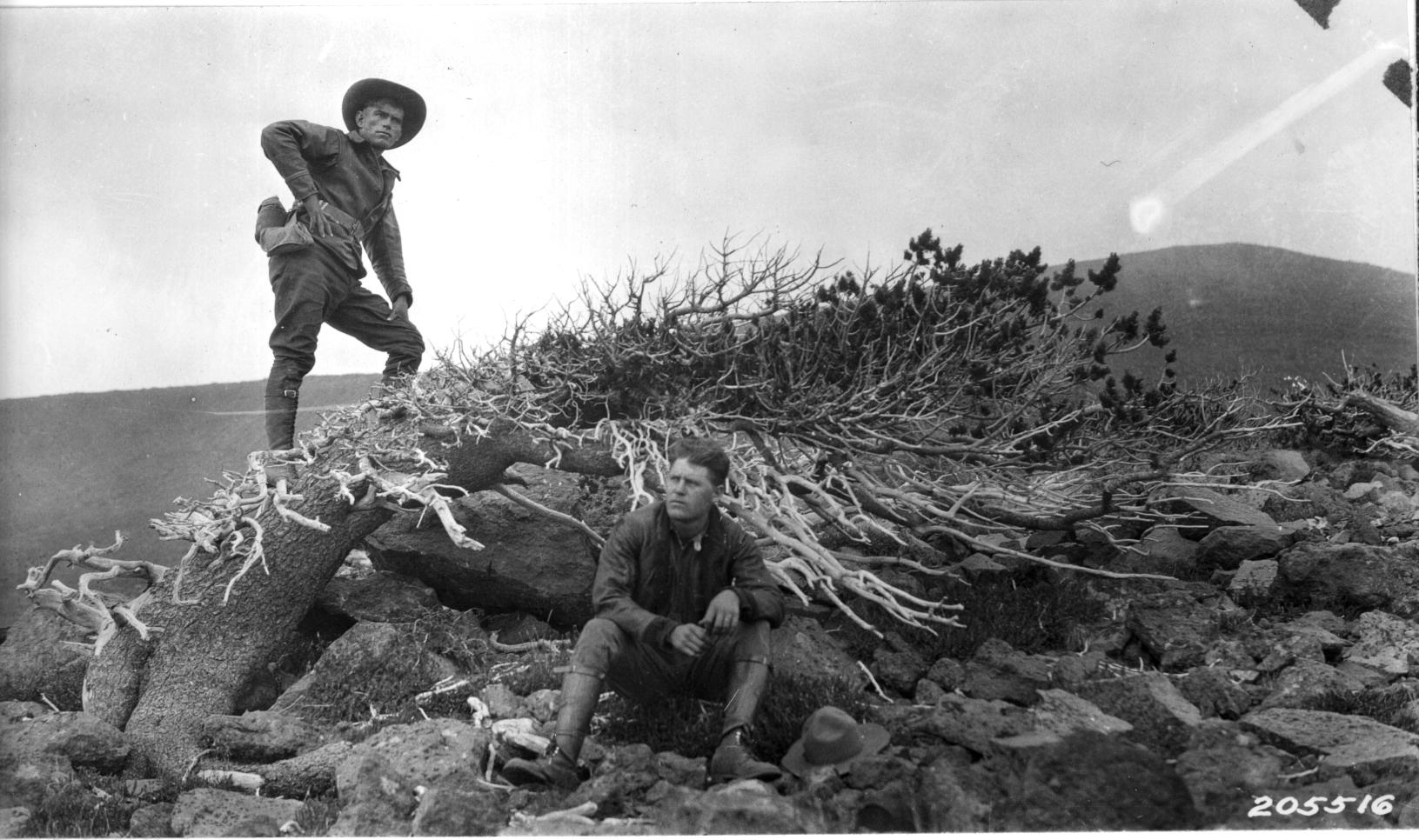
Bristlecone pine (Pinus aristata) at timberline, the summit of the San Francisco Peaks, 1926

In Arizona this species of bristlecone pine is only found on the San Francisco Peaks, four volcanic cinder cones in north-central Arizona. Their alpine trees and flora resemble those of the Southern Rocky Mountains more than that of Nevada or California, including having Colorado bristlecone pines rather than Great Basin bristlecones. There they grow on south facing slopes together with limber pines. This isolated island of mountain habitat is 400 kilometers (250 mi) from the closest alpine habitat in southern Colorado.

In the Southern Rocky Mountains they, like the limber pine, may grow in extensive stands on some sites without other species of tree or may be found intermixed with them. In the southerly parts of the Sangre de Cristo Range they replace the limber pines at higher elevations on very dry sites. It becomes more common in more northerly portions of the range, especially in habitats above 3,000 meters (10,000 ft). A very large bristlecone pine wood of 120 hectares (300 acres) grows in the Valle Vidal within the Carson National Forest. In both New Mexico and Colorado they mostly grow on steep, south-facing slopes that are quite dry.

In Colorado there are more than 50 areas with notable populations of bristlecone pine found in the southern and central mountain ranges of the state. On the Spanish Peaks in southern Colorado bristlecone pines grow together with ponderosa pines and Rocky Mountain white oaks at relative low elevations, an unusual habitat type. Though they also grow in nearly pure stands higher up in the subalpine zone of the Spanish Peaks. A forest of 49 hectares (120 acres) growing on the southeastern flank of Mount Bross in the Pike National Forest is named the Windy Ridge Bristlecone Pine Scenic Area. Further north, they grow on the mountains of the Front Range south of James Peak. In the southern part of the range around Pikes Peak they occur on the south facing slopes while limber pines grow on the north facing areas. In areas around Mount Blue Sky bristlecone pines more often mix with limber pines, though bristlecones tend to be more common on fine textured soils while rocky ridges have more limber pines. The rocks and soils derived from them along the Front Range are Precambrian granite. The small 4.9 hectares (12 acres) grove in the Mount Goliath Natural area is notable both for the age of one of its trees (see Notable trees) as well as for the ease of public access from the Mount Blue Sky Scenic Byway.

The typical habitat of high altitude groves is quite cool, even in summer. In the Front Range it was measured to have a mean annual temperature of 8.3 to 3.3 °C (46.9 to 37.9 °F) in the 1970s. The winds are also quite severe with speeds of 24–40 kilometers (15–25 mi) common.

=== Conservation ===
The International Union for Conservation of Nature last evaluated Pinus aristata in 2012 and listed it as one of their species of "least concern". The evaluation found its population was stable without a continuing decline of mature individuals, but with a naturally very fragmented habitat. In contrast, when NatureServe evaluated it in 1999 they listed it as "vulnerable" (G3) due to its small distribution. They additionally found it to be "imperiled" (S2) in Arizona. In Arizona the state lists it as a salvage resiricted native plant, one that requires a permit for removal including on private land.

== Ecology ==
The seeds of the Rocky Mountain bristlecone are eaten by Clark's nutcracker (Nucifraga columbiana) and may also be stored by them in years where crops of seeds are particularly large. Unlike the seeds of the Colorado pinyon (Pinus edulis) the seeds of show the same speckled patterns for camouflage on soil as other species and are not adapted to be primarily animal dispersed.

The Rocky Mountain bristlecone is quite vulnerable to fire. After forest fires stands show very little regeneration after thirty years and a lower abundance compared with other species tree species that are more able to colonize newly open areas.

== Notable trees ==
The oldest tree in Colorado is a Rocky Mountain bristlecone that was dated by F. Craig Brunstein and David Yamaguchi to 442 BCE. Designated in the 1992 paper as CB-90-11, it grows on Black Mountain in the Pike National Forest west of Pike's Peak. At the time core samples were taken by researchers the trees showed many signs of old age including dead wood that had been sculpted by wind erosion, crowns that had died back, only strips of living bark, and a radius greater than 40 centimeters (1.3 ft). Three other trees in the same area were dated to earlier than 100 BCE.

The oldest known tree on Mount Goliath was discovered by Dr. Paula Krebs in 1970 while working on her doctoral dissertation. The tree, which she named Great Grandma, was dated to 403 CE making it 1623 years old.

The tallest recorded tree is one 23 m (75 ft) tall that grows in the Carson National Forest, New Mexico. When measured in 1996 it also had a diameter of 107 cm (3.5 ft) and a crown spread of 12 m (39.4 ft).

The American National Register of Champion Trees records a tree with a very large diameter of 144 centimeters (56.6 in) Huerfano County, Colorado. This tree also has a height of 18 m (59 ft) and a crown spread of 7.3 m (24 ft) when it was measured in 2018.

== Uses ==
Formerly it was used for fuel, electric utility poles, signposts, and as support timbers in mines.

=== Cultivation ===
Rocky Mountain bristlecone is the most common of the bristlecone pines in cultivation. It is a very attractive slow-growing small tree suitable for small gardens in cold climates. It was brought into cultivation by Parry at the Arnold Arboretum soon after he collected the materials for its scientific description in 1861. It has been cultivated since at least 1863 in the United Kingdom, but is a rarely planted tree there. In gardens it will range from 2–6 meters (8–20 ft) high and 3–4.5 m (10–15 ft) wide. However, due to its slow growth rare it is rare to see one taller than 10 m in landscaping. It requires a well drained soil, one that is rocky and poor in organic material being particularly suitable. They also tolerate alkaline soils.

Trees are tolerant of windy conditions, but will show evidence damage from the wind. They have an extreme resistance to cold, being hardy in USDA zones 3–7. They can be encouraged to grow more quickly with supplemental water, but overwatering resulting in deformed growth or death is a frequent problem in landscaping. The Colorado bristlecone is quite flammable and is also susceptible to air pollution. Though symmetrical and bushy when young, as the trees grow they become more open in structure and irregular in shape.

=== Cultivars ===
==== 'Blue Bear' ====
A thick branched cultivar named for its blue-green foliage. It grows at about 10 to 15 cm (4 to 6 in) each year.

==== 'Formal Form' ====
A cultivar with a narrower, upright growth habit and blue-green foliage.

==== 'Joe's Bess' ====
A dwarf selection that has a uniform shape and upright habit. It is used in full sun borders or as a specimen plant.

==== 'Sherwood Compact' ====
This is a very dwarfed variety. It grows with a somewhat more treelike form when grafted onto Pinus strobus as a rootstock, but remains very small. It was introduced to the horticultural trade in 1983. It also has shorter needles.
