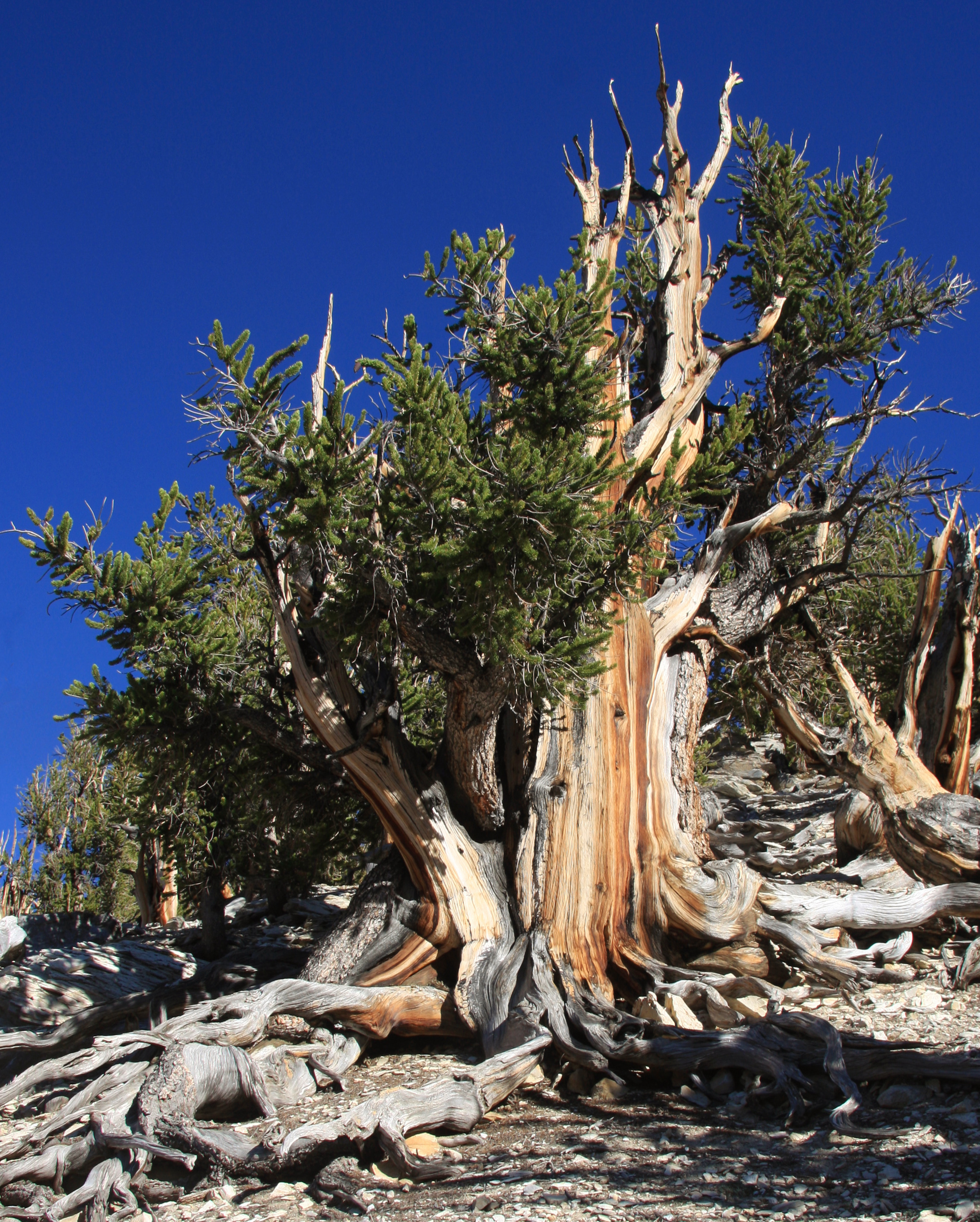
- A tree in the Ancient Bristlecone Pine Forest, White Mountains, California

Conservation status
- Least Concern (IUCN 3.1)

- Apparently Secure (NatureServe)

Scientific classification
- Kingdom: Plantae
- Clade: Tracheophytes
- Clade: Gymnosperms
- Division: Pinophyta
- Class: Pinopsida
- Order: Pinales
- Family: Pinaceae
- Genus: Pinus
- Subgenus: P. subg. Strobus
- Section: P. sect. Parrya
- Subsection: P. subsect. Balfourianae
- Species: P. longaeva

Binomial name
- Pinus longaeva D.K.Bailey
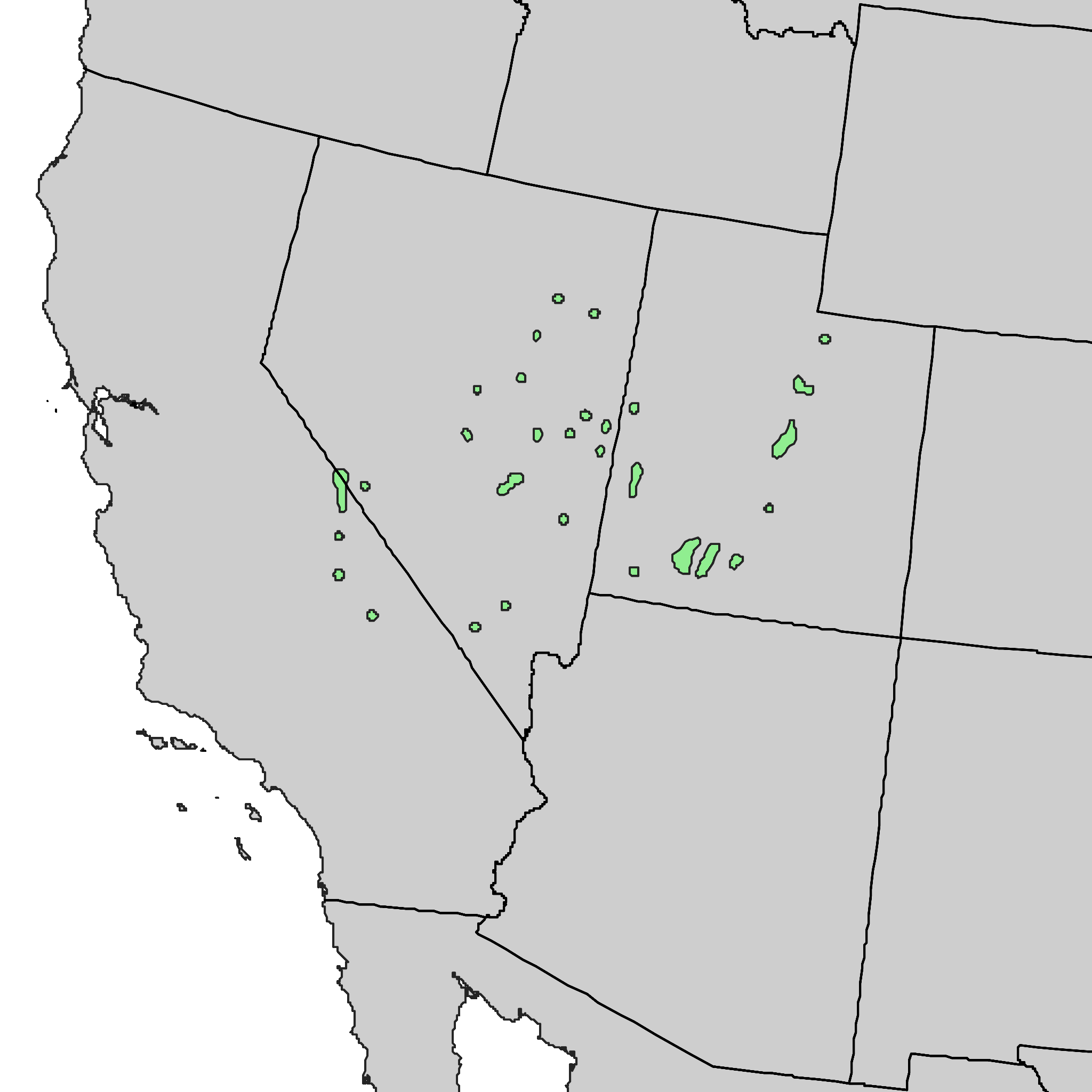

Synonyms
- List: Pinus aristata var. longaeva (D.K.Bailey) Little (1979); Pinus aristata subsp. longaeva (D.K.Bailey) A.E.Murray (1983); Pinus balfouriana subsp. longaeva (D.K.Bailey) A.E.Murray (1982)

= Pinus longaeva =

Species of pine tree found in the western U.S.

Pinus longaeva (commonly referred to as the Great Basin bristlecone pine, intermountain bristlecone pine, or western bristlecone pine) is a long-living species of bristlecone pine tree found in the higher mountains of California, Nevada, and Utah. In 1987, the bristlecone pine was designated one of Nevada's state trees.

Methuselah is a Great Basin bristlecone pine that is 4,858 years old and has been credited as the oldest known living non-clonal organism on Earth.

== Description ==
It is a medium-size tree, reaching 5 to 15 m (16 to 49 ft) tall and with a trunk diameter of up to 2.5 to 3.6 m (8 to 12 ft). The bark is bright orange-yellow, thin and scaly at the base of the trunk. The needles are in fascicles of five, stout, 2.5 to 4 cm (1 to 1 1/2 in) long, deep green to blue-green on the outer face, with stomata confined to a bright white band on the inner surfaces. The leaves show among the longest persistence of any plant, with some remaining green for 45 years.

The cones are ovoid-cylindrical, 5 to 10 cm (2 to 4 in) long and 3 to 4 cm (1 to 1 1/2 in) broad when closed, green or purple at first, ripening orange-buff when 16 months old, with numerous thin, fragile scales, each scale with a bristle-like spine 2 to 5 mm (1/16 to 3/16 in) long. The cones open to 4 to 6 cm (1 1/2 to 2 1/2 in) broad when mature, releasing the seeds immediately after opening. The seeds are 5 mm (3/16 in) long, with a 12 to 22 mm (1/2 to 7/8 in) wing; they are mostly dispersed by the wind, but some are also dispersed by Clark's nutcrackers.

These ancient trees have a gnarled and stunted appearance, especially those found at high altitudes, and have reddish-brown bark with deep fissures. As the tree ages, much of its vascular cambium layer may die. In very old specimens, often only a narrow strip of living tissue connects the roots to a handful of live branches.

The Great Basin bristlecone pine differs from the Rocky Mountain bristlecone pine in that the needles of the former always have two uninterrupted resin canals, so it lacks the characteristic small white resin flecks appearing on the needles of the latter. The Great Basin bristlecone pine differs from the foxtail pine because the cone bristles of the former are over 2 mm (0.079 in) long, and the cones have a more rounded (not conic) base. The green pine needles give the twisted branches a bottle-brush appearance. The name 'bristlecone pine' refers to the dark purple female cones that bear incurved prickles on their surface.

== Distribution and ecology ==
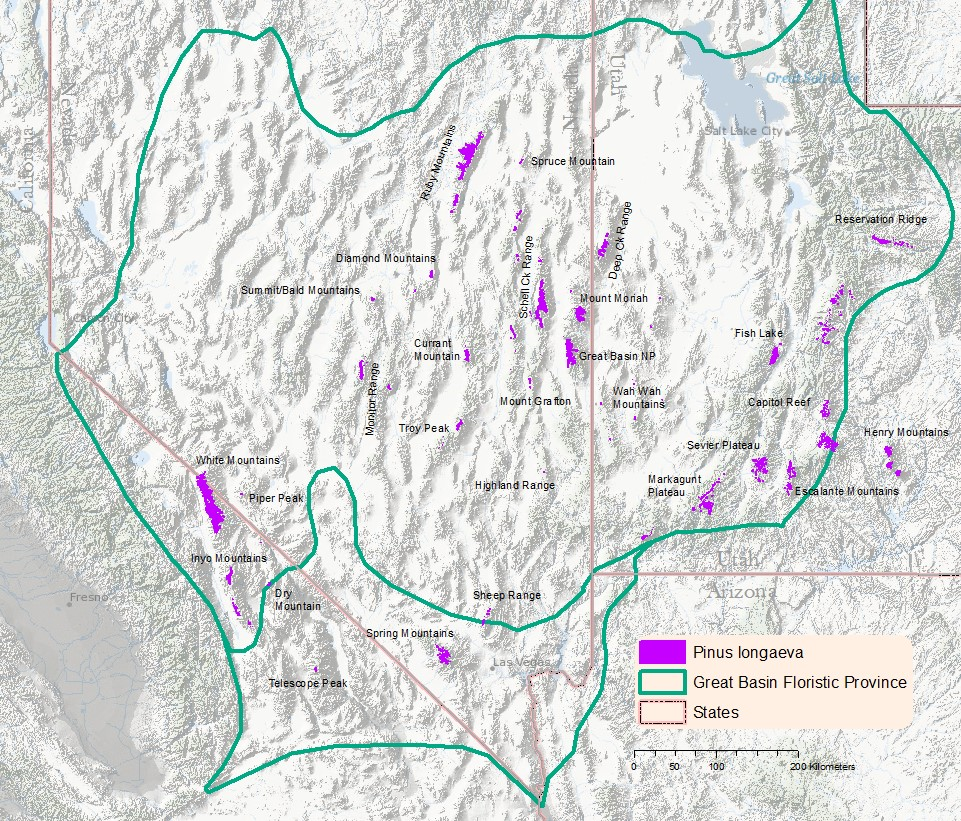
Pinus longaeva distribution map (click map to enlarge)

The species occurs in Utah, Nevada and Eastern California. In California, it is restricted to the White Mountains, the Inyo Mountains, and the Panamint Range, in Mono and Inyo counties. In Nevada, it is found in most of the higher elevations of the Basin and Range from the Spring Mountains near Las Vegas north to the Ruby Mountains, and in Utah, northeast to South Tent in the Wasatch Range. Due to the inaccessibility of much of the range and distribution of this species is incomplete, due to the difficult terrain it inhabits. Species distribution modelling has been used to better map its distribution, using topographic and spectral variables calculated from a geographic information system (GIS).

Unlike the related foxtail pine, which sometimes form dense forests, Pinus longaeva generally grows in large open stands, usually covering only 15–50%. This species shares habitats with a number of other pine species, including the ponderosa pine, the white fir and the limber pine, a similarly long-lived high-elevation species. It is a primary succession species, growing quickly on new open ground. It is a poor competitor in good soils, however, thriving best in harsh terrain. Pinus longaeva is often the dominant species in high-elevation dolomite soils, where few plants can grow.

Bristlecone pines are protected in a number of areas owned by the United States federal government, such as the Ancient Bristlecone Pine Forest in the White Mountains of California and the Great Basin National Park in Nevada. These areas prohibit the cutting or gathering of wood.

The Clark's nutcracker may play a role in seed distribution for P. longaeva. These birds bury conifer seeds in the ground for later use. Some of these stored seeds are not used and grow into new plants. These trees often exhibit a "multi-trunk" growth form from several seeds germinating at the same time. The prevalence of multi-trunk P. longaeva specimens in areas in which the Clark's nutcracker is present has been used as evidence that the birds disperse P. longaeva seeds.

An introduced fungal disease known as white pine blister rust has affected some individuals. In 2011, however, a population survey found the population of P. longaeva to be stable, and white pine blister rust was found to have a negligible effect on the population. As a result, the species has been classified as "Least Concern".

=== Fire ecology ===
The tree is extremely susceptible to fire, and is damaged by even low-intensity burns. The resinous bark is capable of igniting quickly, and a crown fire will almost certainly kill the tree. However, populations of Pinus longaeva are known to be extremely resilient, and as a primary succession species, it is believed that populations of the tree would reestablish itself quickly after a fire. That said, large-scale fires are extremely uncommon where the species grows, and are not a major factor in the species' long-term viability. Historically, Pinus longaeva stands experienced low to high severity fires, and fuels structures changed considerably across elevational gradients. In low elevation, mixed species stands, fuels are often heavy and in close proximity to anthropogenic ignition sources. Yet at high elevations near treeline, Pinus longaeva typically grow on limestone outcroppings that provide little or no surface fuels to propagate a wildfire. However, warmer temperatures will likely increase the duration of fire season, and thus the frequency of fire in Pinus longeava systems at low and mid elevations could increase where stands are typically denser and surface fuel is greatest. While rare, wild fires such as The Carpenter 1 fire in southern Nevada (July 2013) and the Phillips Fire in Great Basin National Park, (September 2000) that started in lower elevation fuel types and moved through the crowns of trees with the aid of extreme fire weather, could become more likely.

== Age ==
In 2010, a specimen located in the White Mountains of California was determined by Tom Harlan (a researcher with the Laboratory of Tree-Ring Research) to be 5,062 years old. This would make it the oldest known non-clonal tree in the world. The identity of the specimen was kept secret by Harlan. Harlan died in 2013, and neither the tree nor the core sample Harlan studied has been found, making the age or existence of this tree unable to be confirmed.

The confirmed oldest tree of this species, "Methuselah", is also located in the Ancient Bristlecone Pine Forest of the White Mountains. Methuselah is 4,858 years old, as measured by annual ring count on a small core sample taken with an increment borer.

Among the White Mountain specimens, the oldest trees are found on north-facing slopes, with an average of 2,000 years, as compared to the 1,000 year average on the southern slopes. The climate and the durability of their wood can preserve them long after death, with dead trees as old as 7,000 years persisting next to live ones.

== Gallery ==
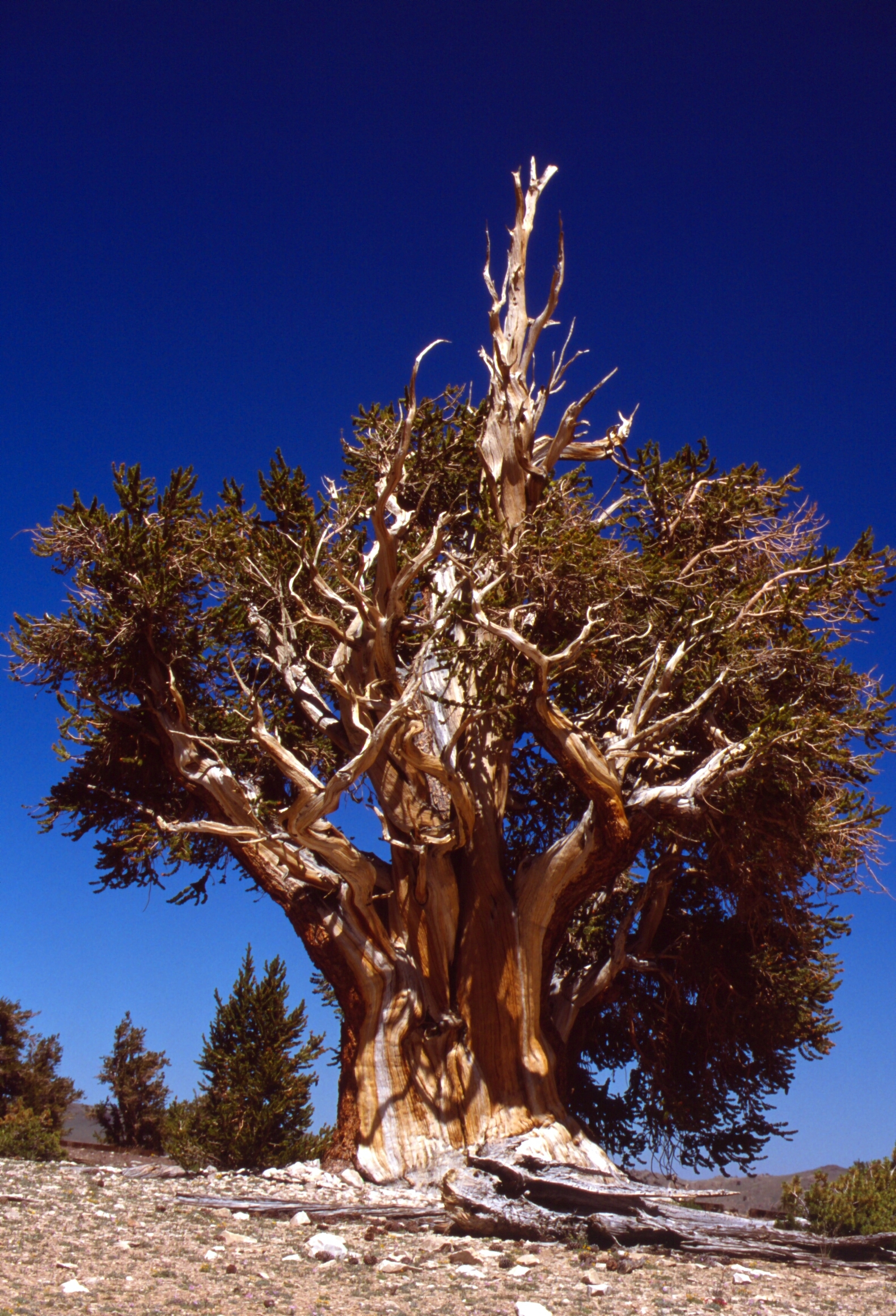
Tree in Inyo National Forest

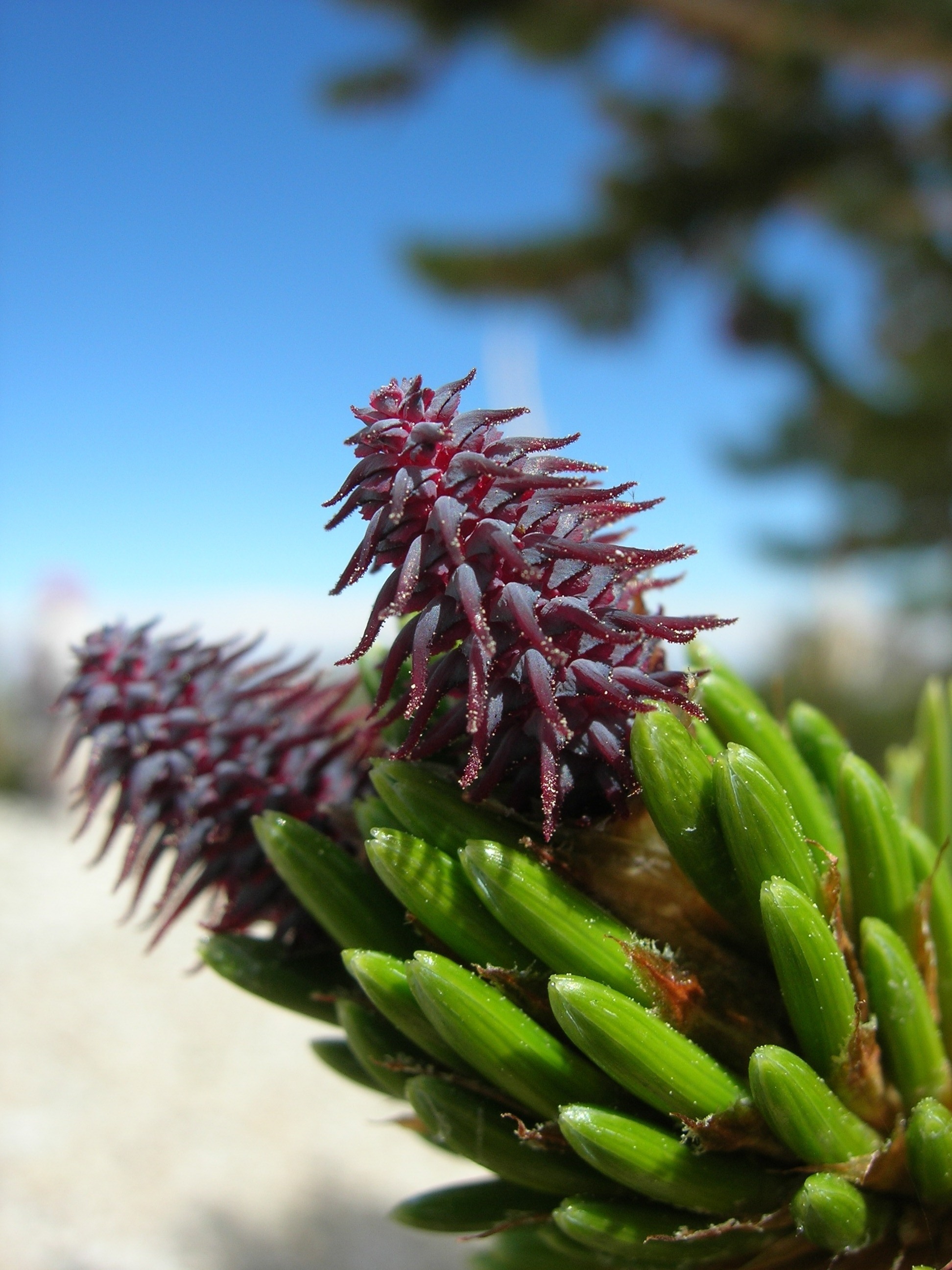
Young seed (female) cone

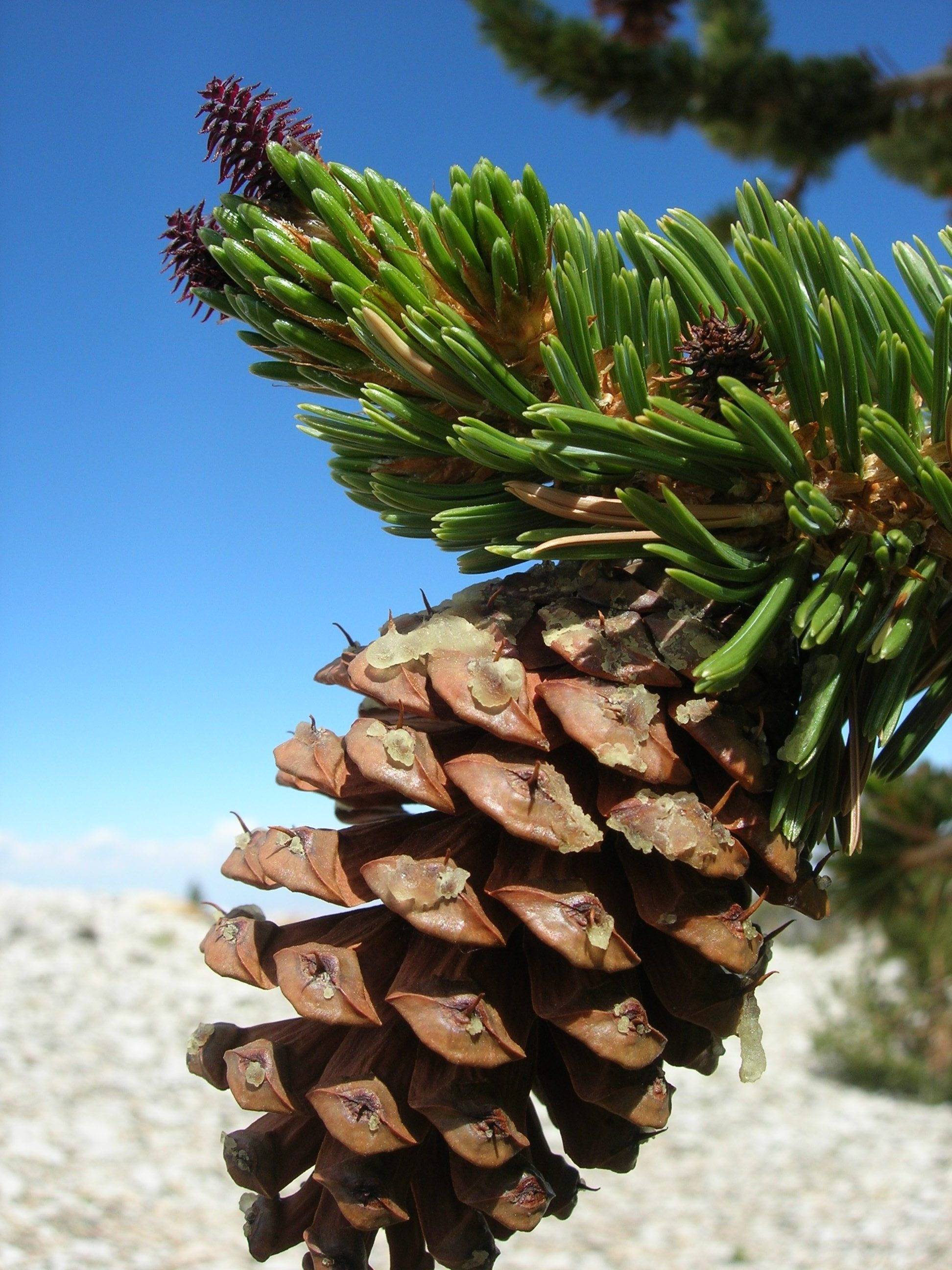
Mature seed (female) cone

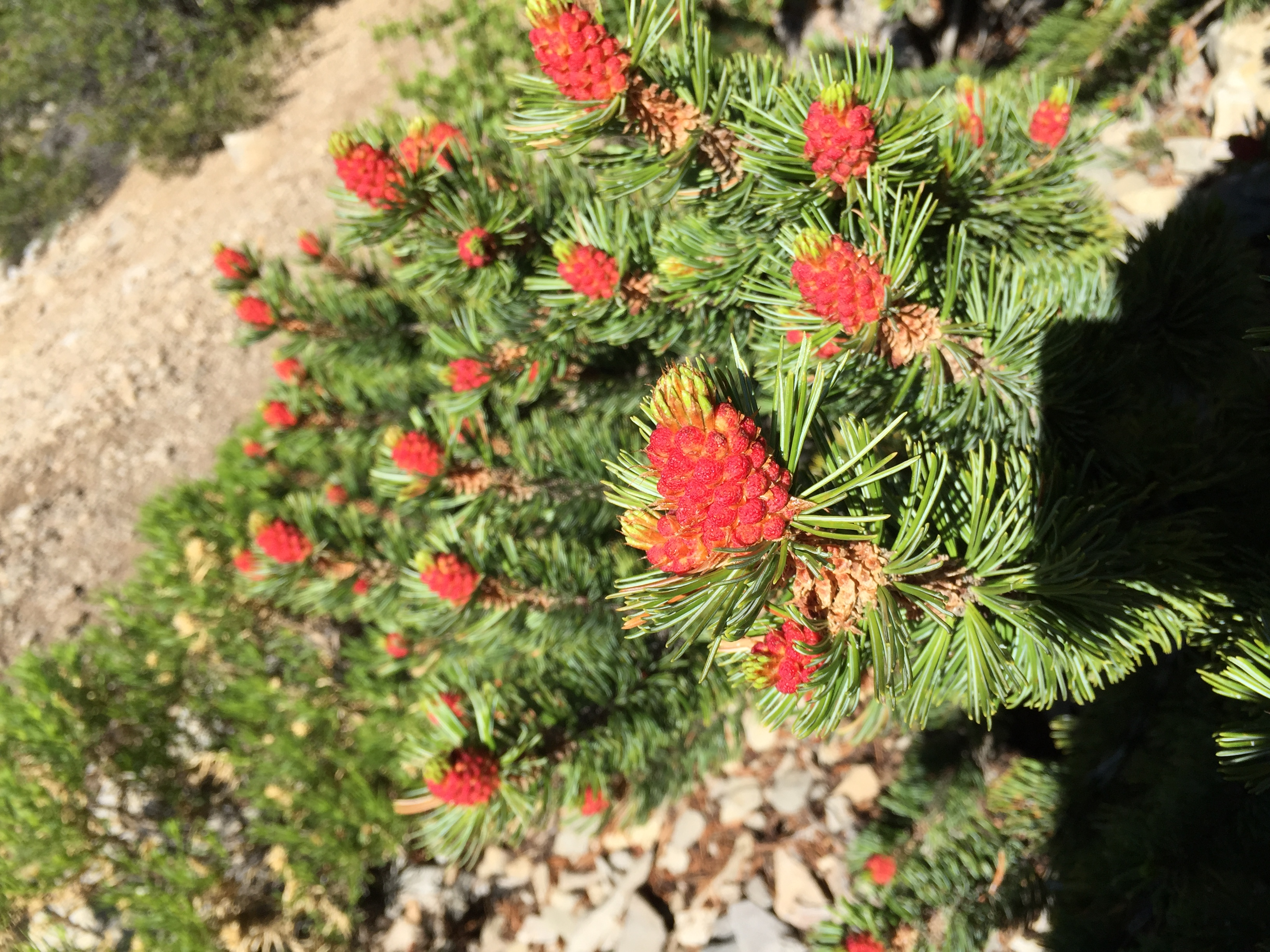
Pollen (male) cones

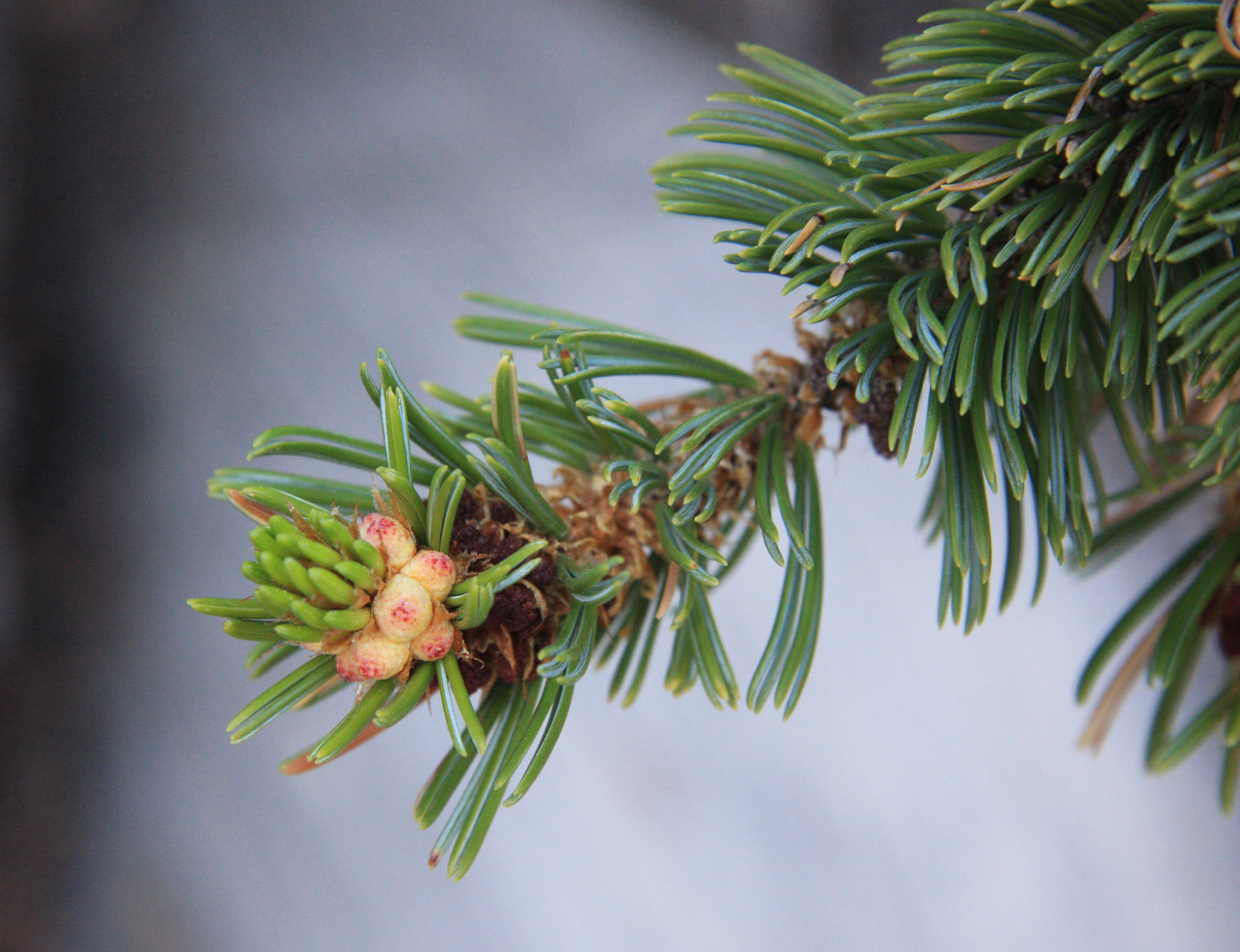
New growth

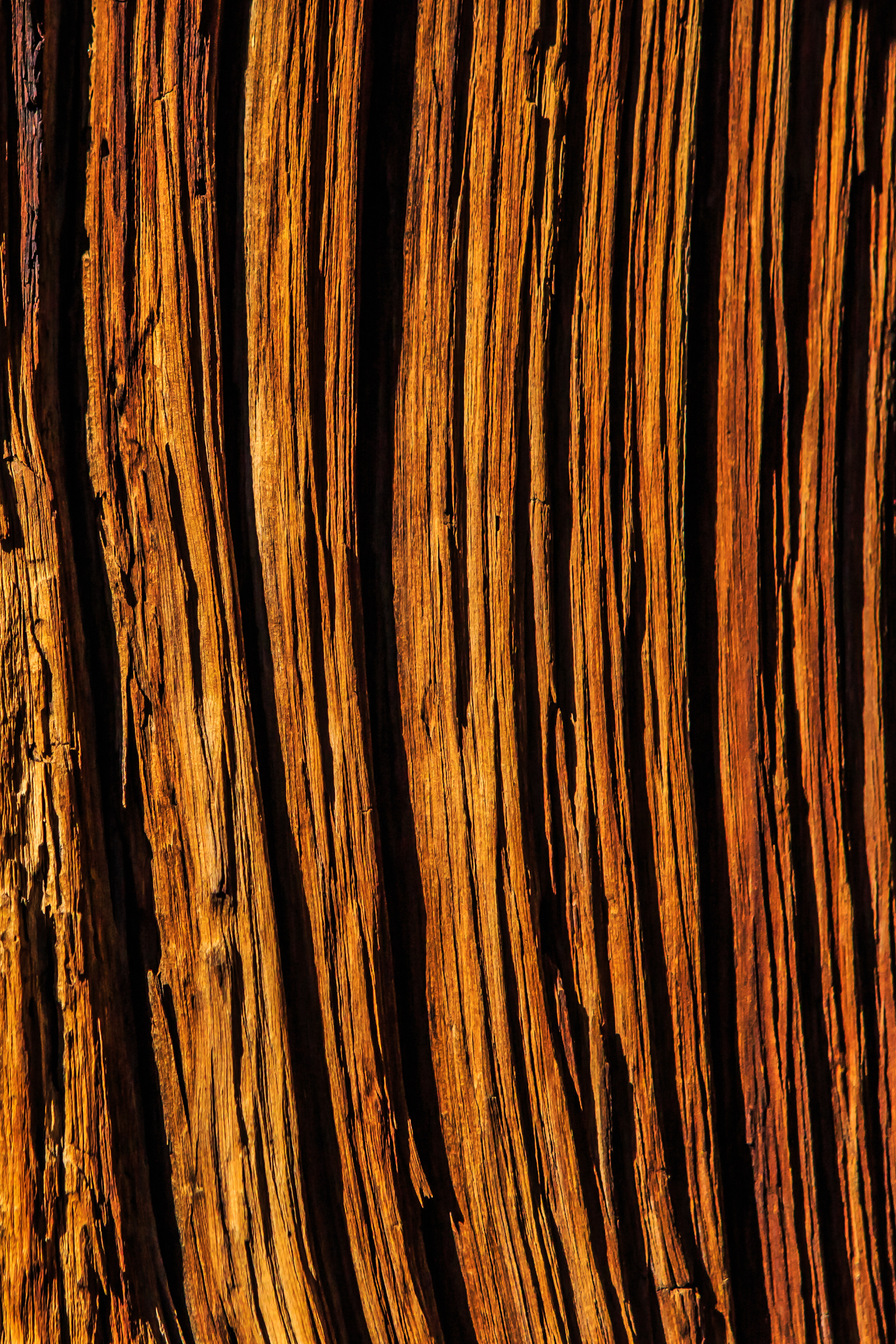
Exposed wood after bark has been stripped away

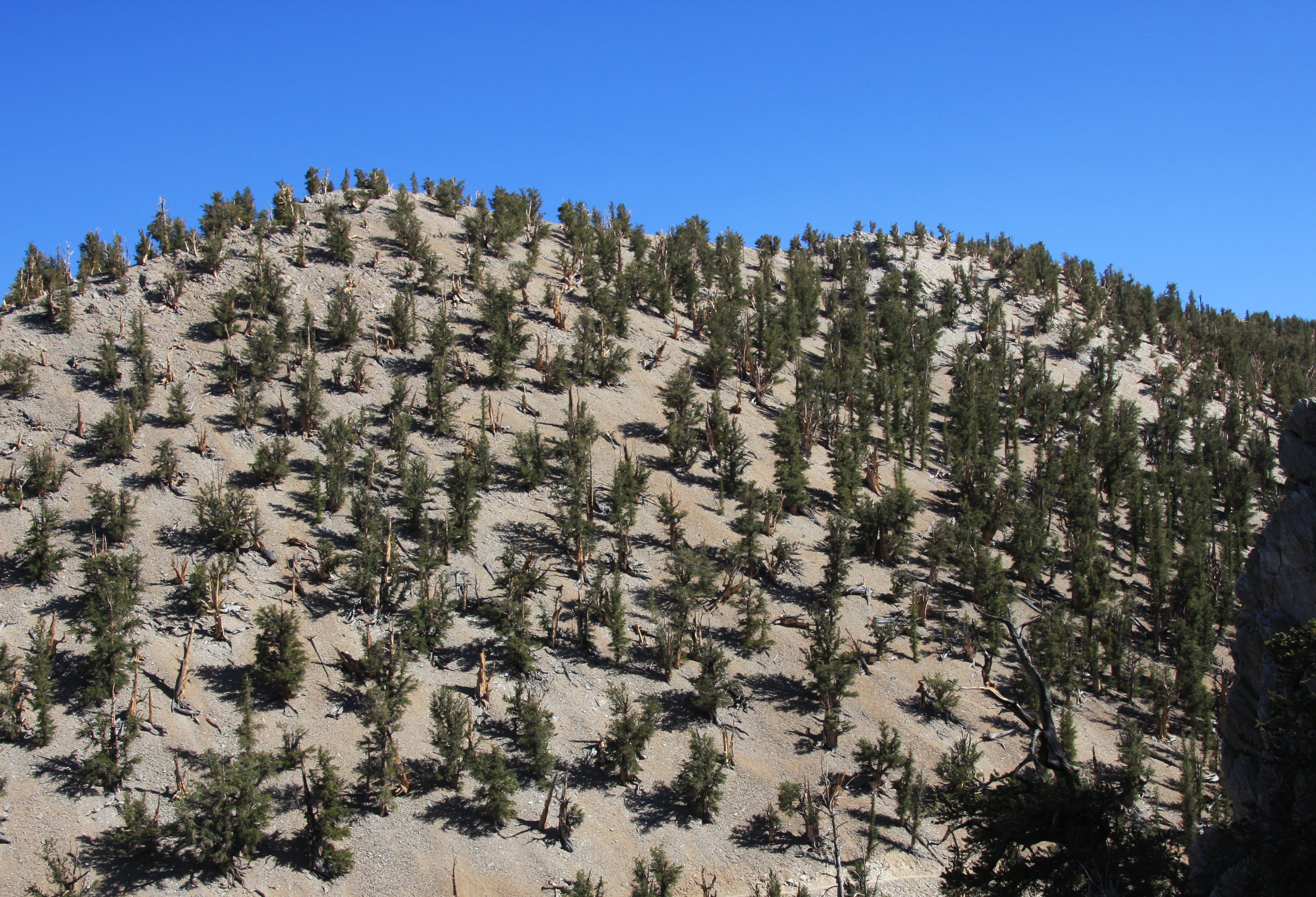
Bristlecones on dolomite hillside, Ancient Bristlecone Pine Forest

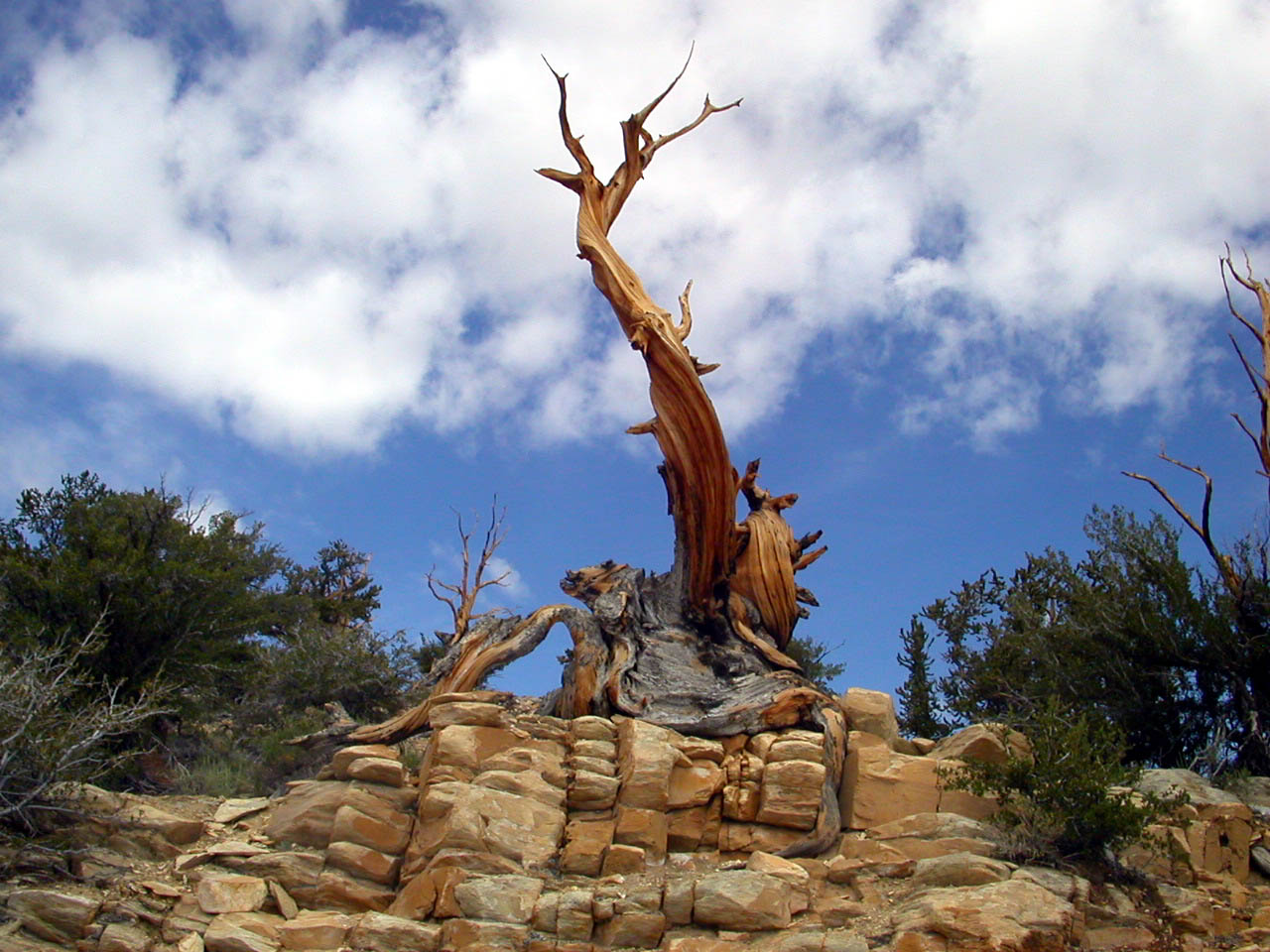
Bristlecone pine, White Mountains, California

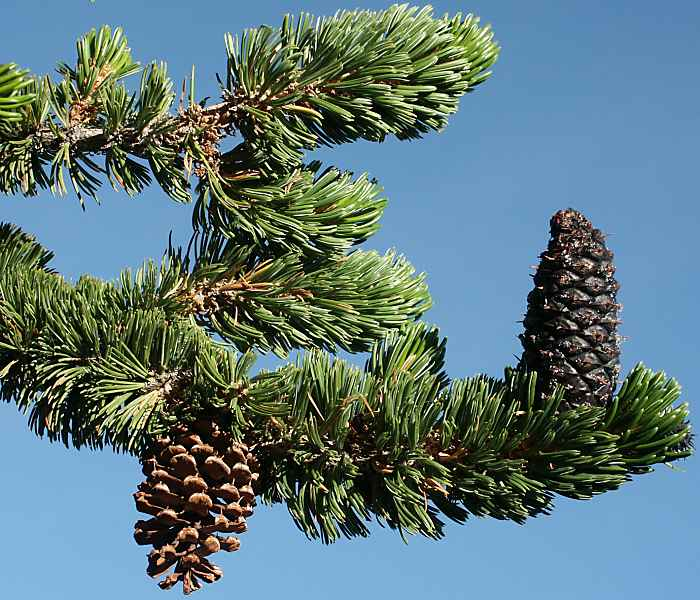
Needles and cones, Snake Range, Nevada

== See also ==
- List of superlative trees
