= Benton, California =

Benton, California Ütü’ütü witü (Mono)
- Census-designated place
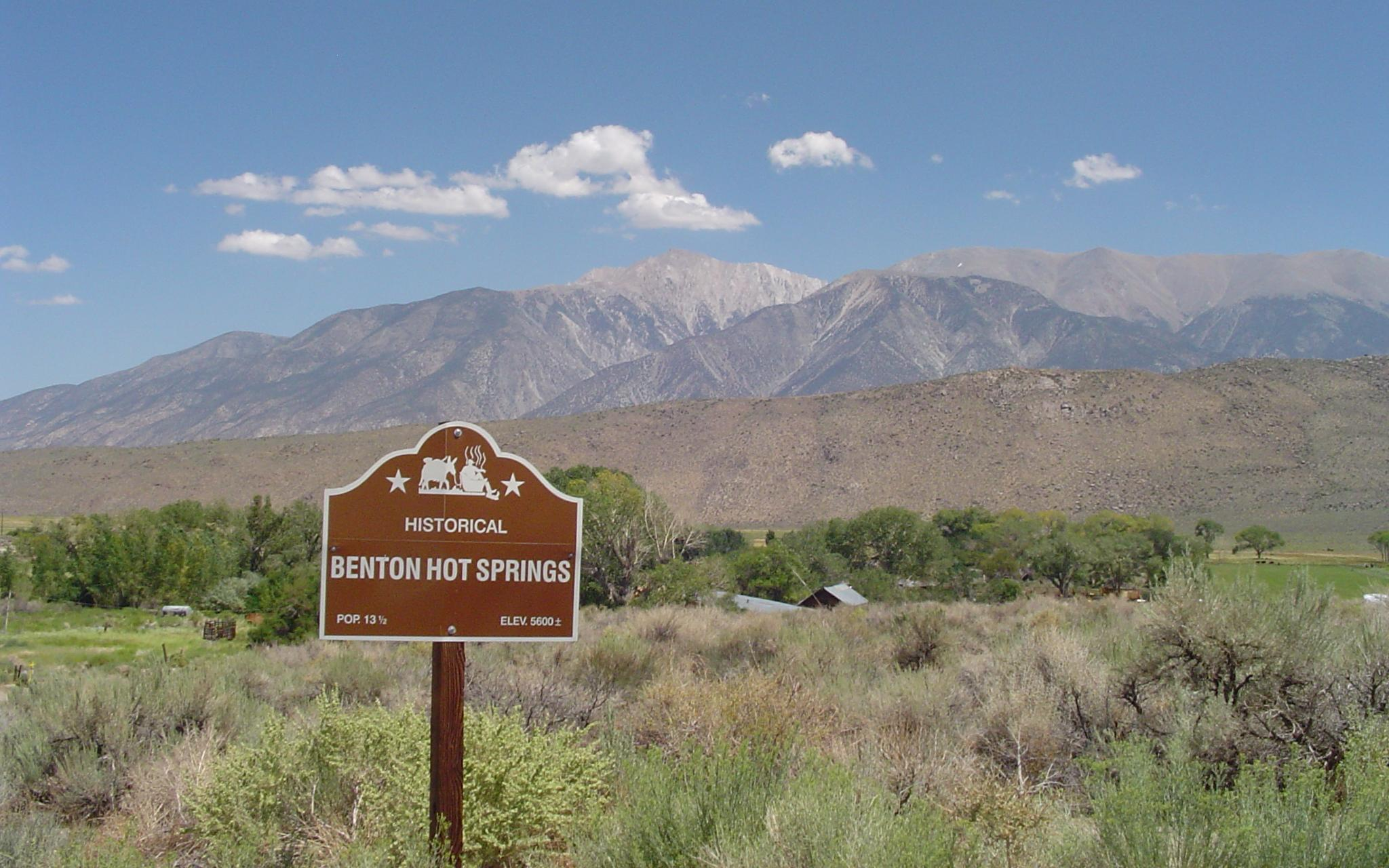
- Benton Hot Springs and the White Mountains

- Location of Benton in Mono County, California

- Location within California Location within the United States
- Coordinates: 37°49′09″N 118°28′35″W
- Country: United States
- State: California
- County: Mono

Area
  - Total: 28.49 sq mi (73.79 km^{2})
  - Land: 28.47 sq mi (73.73 km^{2})
  - Water: 0.019 sq mi (0.05 km^{2}) 0.07%
- Elevation: 5,361 ft (1,634 m)

Population (2020)
  - Total: 279
  - Density: 9.8/sq mi (3.8/km^{2})
- Time zone: UTC-8 (Pacific)
  - Summer (DST): UTC-7 (PDT)
- ZIP code: 93512
- Area codes: 442/760
- GNIS feature IDs: 2582943

Benton (formerly Benton Station, Mono: Ütü’ütü witü) is a census-designated place (CDP) in Mono County, California, United States. It includes the unincorporated communities of Benton and Benton Hot Springs and is 32 miles (51 km) north of the community of Bishop. The population of the CDP was 279 at the 2020 census.

Benton was once a small mining town with up to 5,000 inhabitants. Many of the original buildings remain, and the town has never completely died.

The 160 acres (65 hectares) Benton Paiute Reservation, with about 50 full-time residents, is in the southwest part of the CDP, less than a mile south of Benton Hot Springs.

== History ==
Benton, named after Missouri Senator Thomas Hart Benton, an advocate of western expansion, is one of the oldest existing towns in Mono County. Benton was founded by the western Indians who came to make use of its hot springs. As the nearby towns of Bodie and Aurora grew in size and population, Benton soon became a checkpoint for southbound travelers in 1852.

Gold was discovered in the hills of Benton in 1862, and its population quickly grew. After the initial gold strike, little more was found. Benton's profits were soon primarily from silver. Unlike other mining towns, Benton was able to provide enough for the town to thrive and flourish for approximately 50 years. Although most mining activity occurred between 1862 and 1890, the town never completely collapsed.

The Carson and Colorado Railroad reached Benton in 1883.

== Geography ==
Benton lies along U.S. Route 6 outside of Bishop, en route to remote areas of Nevada. The terrain is described as high desert at an elevation of 5,377 feet (1,639 m) above sea level. California State Route 120 has its eastern terminus at US 6 in Benton. It leads southwest 4 miles (6 km) to the Benton Hot Springs part of the CDP, then continues west 41 miles (66 km) to U.S. Route 395 near Lee Vining.

The Nevada state line is about 6 miles (10 km) northeast of Benton. US Route 6 crosses this border, then climbs over 7,150-foot (2,180 m) Montgomery Pass at the northern end of the White Mountains. Benton has excellent views to the east of 13,141-foot (4,005 m) Boundary Peak, Nevada's highest, and 13,441-foot (4,097 m) Montgomery Peak just next to it in California.

According to the United States Census Bureau, the CDP covers an area of 28.5 square miles (74 km^{2}), 99.93% of it land, and 0.07% of it water. It is primarily in the Benton Valley, drained to the south by Spring Canyon Creek, leading to the Hammil Valley and eventually to the Owens Valley. Benton Hot Springs, in the southwest part of the CDP, is in Blind Spring Valley, which drains northeast to Benton proper.

=== Climate ===
A weather station was run in the town from 1964 to 2013. However, temperatures were recorded for only three of those years, and the record is thus very sparse. Benton has a cold-semi arid climate that has notably extremely high temperature variations within any given day of the year. Temperatures in a winter day can have a temperature dirunial of about 30F ranging from the mild low 50s in the day to bitterly cold 10s and 20s at night. Summers, on the other hand, have even greater temperature variations within a day has highs are in the low to mid 90s with lows being cool at the low 50s and high 40s. Being in the rain shadow of the Sierra Nevada, Benton experiences very minimal precipitation that's spread relatively even throughout the year with winters getting 0.5-0.75 more inches of precipitation than summer. Snowfall is also common in the winters, too.

Climate data for Benton Inspection Station
Month	Jan	Feb	Mar	Apr	May	Jun	Jul	Aug	Sep	Oct	Nov	Dec	Year
Record high °F (°C)	72 (22)	76 (24)	91 (33)	88 (31)	96 (36)	105 (41)	106 (41)	103 (39)	102 (39)	93 (34)	80 (27)	74 (23)	106 (41)
Mean maximum °F (°C)	66 (19)	67 (19)	75 (24)	82 (28)	89 (32)	97 (36)	101 (38)	99 (37)	94 (34)	85 (29)	74 (23)	66 (19)	102 (39)
Mean daily maximum °F (°C)	52.9 (11.6)	54.3 (12.4)	62.4 (16.9)	68.3 (20.2)	79.7 (26.5)	88.7 (31.5)	92.4 (33.6)	93.4 (34.1)	86.1 (30.1)	70.3 (21.3)	59.3 (15.2)	51.3 (10.7)	71.6 (22.0)
Mean daily minimum °F (°C)	21.7 (−5.7)	21.1 (−6.1)	25.9 (−3.4)	31.6 (−0.2)	40.4 (4.7)	46.5 (8.1)	51.8 (11.0)	51.6 (10.9)	43.0 (6.1)	32.2 (0.1)	25.2 (−3.8)	19.6 (−6.9)	34.2 (1.2)
Mean minimum °F (°C)	7 (−14)	11 (−12)	15 (−9)	19 (−7)	27 (−3)	35 (2)	44 (7)	42 (6)	32 (0)	22 (−6)	12 (−11)	6 (−14)	1 (−17)
Record low °F (°C)	−6 (−21)	−5 (−21)	3 (−16)	10 (−12)	19 (−7)	25 (−4)	36 (2)	35 (2)	25 (−4)	7 (−14)	−2 (−19)	−3 (−19)	−6 (−21)
Average precipitation inches (mm)	1.08 (27)	1.22 (31)	0.89 (23)	0.35 (8.9)	0.42 (11)	0.39 (9.9)	0.47 (12)	0.44 (11)	0.31 (7.9)	0.30 (7.6)	0.66 (17)	0.98 (25)	7.51 (191.3)
Average snowfall inches (cm)	4.9 (12)	2.2 (5.6)	1.3 (3.3)	0.6 (1.5)	0.3 (0.76)	0.0 (0.0)	0.0 (0.0)	0.0 (0.0)	0.0 (0.0)	0.0 (0.0)	1.3 (3.3)	3.0 (7.6)	13.6 (34.06)

== Arts and culture ==
Every September, the White Mountain Fire Protection district hosts the Benton Music Festival as a way to raise funds for the fire department

== Demographics ==
Historical population
Census	Pop.	Note	%±
2010	280		—
2020	279		−0.4%
U.S. Decennial Census; 1850–1870 1880-1890; 1900 1910 1920; 1930 1940 1950; 1960 1970 1980; 1990 2000 2010

=== 2020 census ===
As of the 2020 census, Benton had a population of 279. The population density was 9.8 inhabitants per square mile (3.8/km^{2}). The median age was 48.3 years. The age distribution was 51 people (18.3%) under the age of 18, 10 people (3.6%) aged 18 to 24, 70 people (25.1%) aged 25 to 44, 103 people (36.9%) aged 45 to 64, and 45 people (16.1%) who were 65 years of age or older. For every 100 females there were 96.5 males, and for every 100 females age 18 and over there were 96.6 males age 18 and over.

0.0% of residents lived in urban areas, while 100.0% lived in rural areas.

The whole population lived in households. There were 127 households in Benton, of which 25.2% had children under the age of 18 living in them. Of all households, 47.2% were married-couple households, 18.9% were households with a male householder and no spouse or partner present, and 24.4% were households with a female householder and no spouse or partner present. About 22.8% of all households were made up of individuals and 11.0% had someone living alone who was 65 years of age or older. The average household size was 2.20. There were 88 families (69.3% of all households).

There were 157 housing units, of which 19.1% were vacant. The homeowner vacancy rate was 0.0% and the rental vacancy rate was 2.6%. Of the 127 occupied units, 90 (70.9%) were owner-occupied, and 37 (29.1%) were occupied by renters.

Racial composition as of the 2020 census
Race	Number	Percent
White	198	71.0%
Black or African American	1	0.4%
American Indian and Alaska Native	24	8.6%
Asian	1	0.4%
Native Hawaiian and Other Pacific Islander	1	0.4%
Some other race	21	7.5%
Two or more races	33	11.8%
Hispanic or Latino (of any race)	37	13.3%

=== 2010 census ===
Benton first appeared as a census designated place in the 2010 U.S. census.

== Education ==
Benton is in the Eastern Sierra Unified School District. An elementary school, Edna Beaman Elementary, is located in town. There was a high school, which was closed after the 2011–2012 school year.

== Attractions ==
The hot springs are one of the major attractions in Benton, as well as fine bed and breakfast rooms and overnight soaking tubs. With the abandonment of travelers' services at nearby Montgomery Pass, it offers the only lodging, restaurant and gas station services within a 30-mile (48 km) radius. The Benton Crossing Cafe is owned and operated by Utu Utu Gwaitu Paiute Tribe of the Benton Paiute Reservation.

There are several old mines in the surrounding hills that have been a source of interest to tourists, as well as the hiking and mountain biking trails in the area. Many of the original buildings from the old mine town still exist and are open to exploration, including the cemetery. Benton is a departure point for hiking to Nevada high point Boundary Peak via a (rough) 2WD road to Queen Mine at 9,200 ft (2,800 m) or a 4WD extension to Kennedy Saddle at 9,900 ft (3,000 m).
