= Montgomery Peak =

Mountain in California, United States

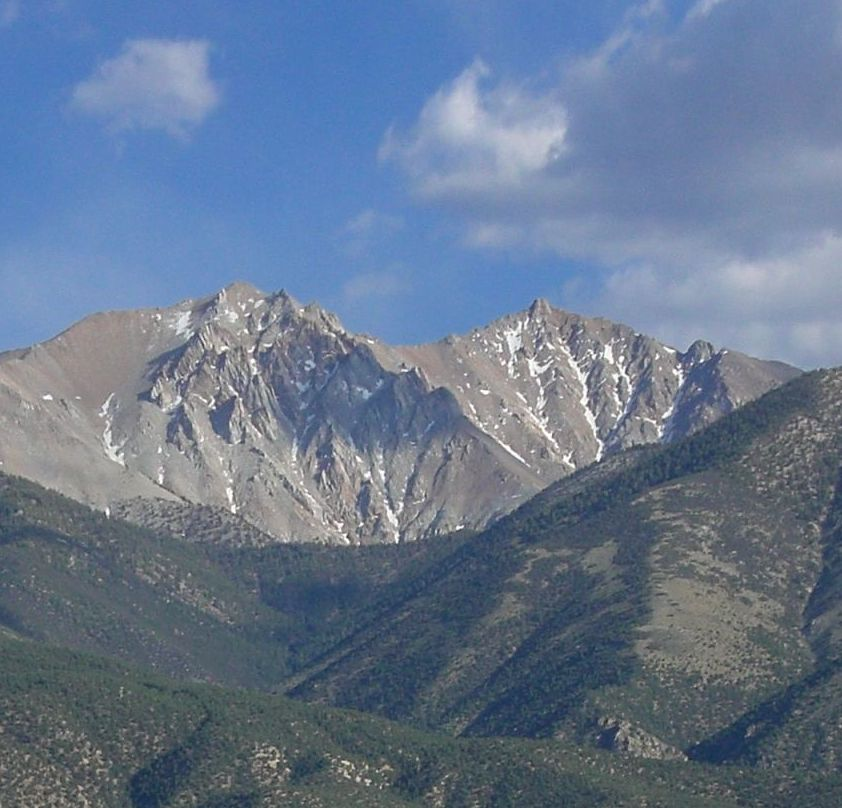
- Montgomery Peak (right) and Boundary Peak

Highest point
- Elevation: 13,447 ft (4,099 m) NAVD 88
- Prominence: 1,266 ft (386 m)
- Listing: DPS Emblem Peak; Great Basin Peaks Section List; Western States Climbers List
- Coordinates: 37°50′18″N 118°21′24″W

Geography
- Location within California
- Location: White Mountains Wilderness; Mono County, California, U.S.
- Parent range: White Mountains
- Topo map: USGS Boundary Peak

Climbing
- Easiest route: Scramble, class 2

Montgomery Peak is a mountain in the White Mountains of California, USA. It is less than 1 mile (1.6 km) from Boundary Peak, the highest point in Nevada. It is taller than Boundary Peak, which, with a prominence of 253 feet (77 m), is usually considered a sub-peak of Montgomery Peak. Montgomery can be climbed in combination with Boundary Peak. The two peaks are in the Inyo National Forest and White Mountains Wilderness. Montgomery Peak is in Mono County (California), and Boundary Peak is in Esmeralda County, in Nevada.
