= Boundary Peak =

Boundary Peak may refer to:

- Boundary Peak, the former name of Popes Peak, an historic summit on the Canadian Rockies on the British Columbia border
- any of c. 1000 peaks forming the international boundary between the British Columbia and Yukon, Canada, and Alaska, United States, numbered in sequence; see List of Boundary Peaks of the Alaska-British Columbia border
- Boundary Peak (Maine)
- Boundary Peak (Nevada)
  - Boundary Peak Wilderness, Nevada
- Boundary Peak (New York), near Avalanche Lake in New York State
