= White Mountains Wilderness =

Protected wilderness area in California, United States

- IUCN category Ib (wilderness area)
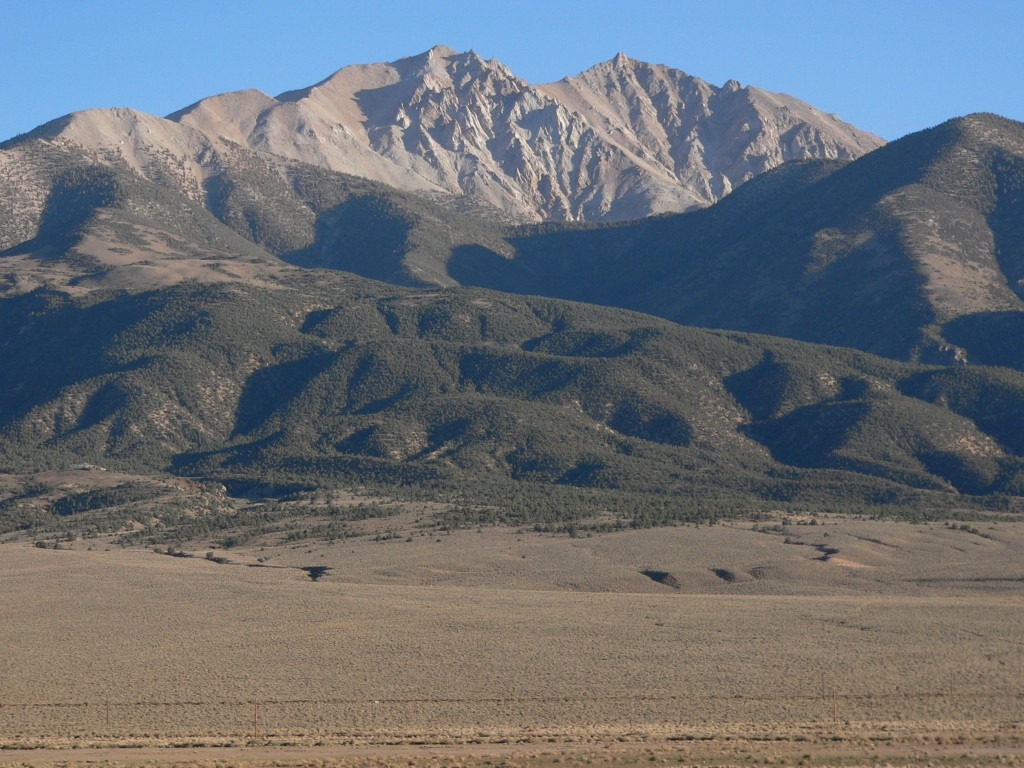
- Montgomery Peak (right) and the White Mountains (foreground) in the White Mountains Wilderness

- Location within California Location within the United States
- Location: Inyo and Mono counties, California, United States
- Coordinates: 37.6175802°N 118.2036229°W
- Area: 228,454 acres (92,452 ha)
- Established: March 30, 2009
- Administrator: U.S. Forest Service; Bureau of Land Management

The White Mountains Wilderness is a 228,454 acres (924.52 km^{2}) wilderness area in the White Mountains of California, United States. It was established by the U.S. Congress under the Omnibus Public Lands Management Act of 2009. Most of the wilderness (206,804 acres (83,691 ha) ) is in Inyo National Forest and managed by the U.S. Forest Service, and the remaining area is managed by the Bureau of Land Management. The wilderness' northern boundary ends on the southern slopes of Boundary Peak, itself part of Boundary Wilderness in Esmeralda County, Nevada.

Signs placed at the entrance of the wilderness near the trail to White Mountain Peak were initially misspelled "White Mountain Wilderness", the name of another wilderness area in New Mexico.

== Geology and hydrology ==
White Mountain, roughly centered in the wilderness, is the highest mountain peak in the Great Basin, rising to 14,252 feet (4,344 m). Cottonwood Creek, which flows through the southeastern portion of the wilderness, was also designated a Wild and Scenic under the Omnibus Public Lands Management Act of 2009.

== Flora and fauna ==
The area is prime habitat for ungulates like desert bighorn sheep, pronghorn, and mule deer, and for over 1,000 plant species and varieties, including the northern terminus of the Ancient Bristlecone Pine Forest, trianglelobe moonwort, and Poison Canyon stickseed. Paiute cutthroat trout also call Cottonwood Creek their home.
