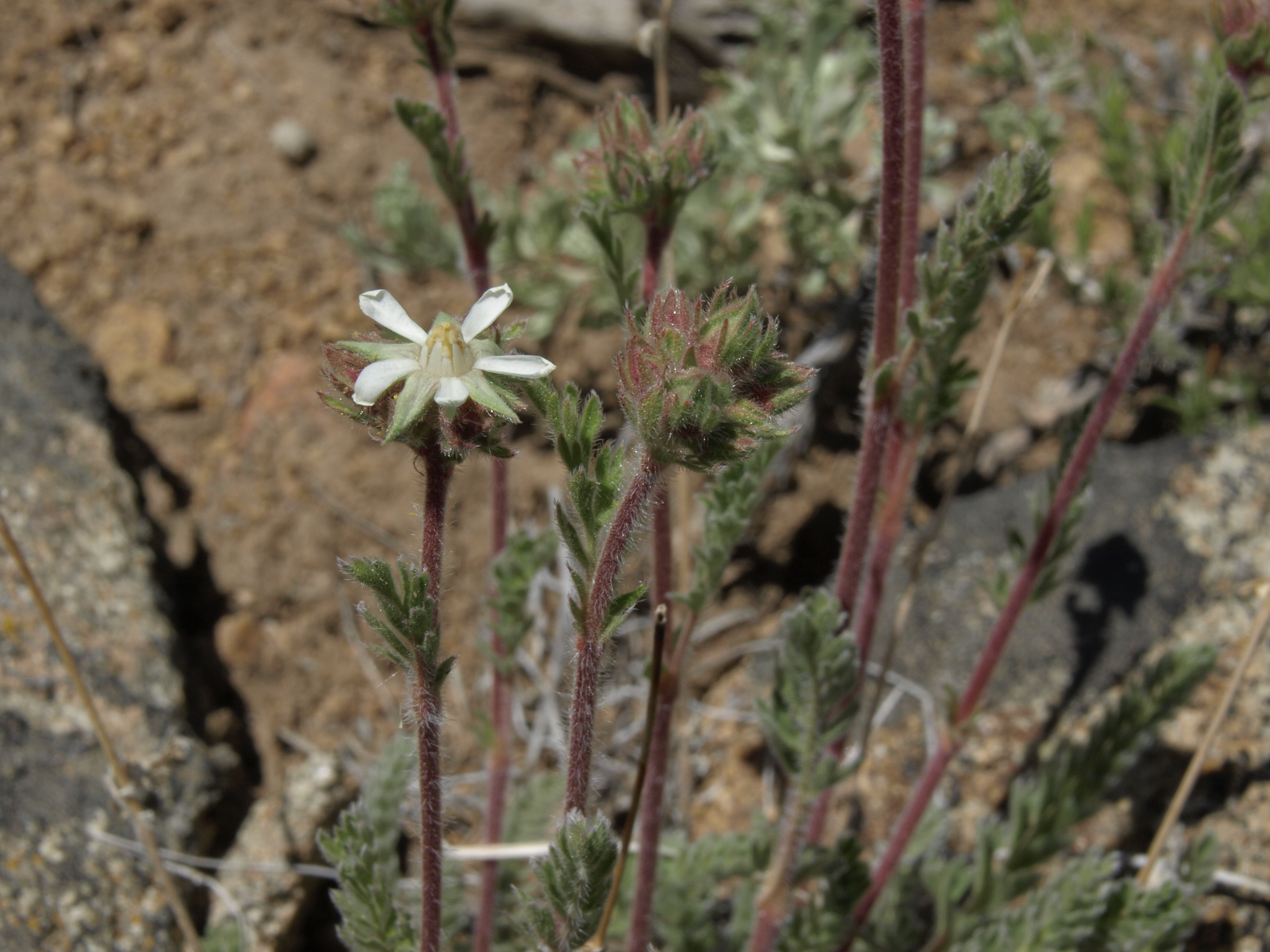

Scientific classification
- Kingdom: Plantae
- Clade: Tracheophytes
- Clade: Angiosperms
- Clade: Eudicots
- Clade: Rosids
- Order: Rosales
- Family: Rosaceae
- Genus: Potentilla
- Species: P. hispidula

Binomial name
- Potentilla hispidula (Rydb.) Jeps.

Synonyms
- Horkelia hispidula Rydb.

= Potentilla hispidula =

Species of flowering plant

Potentilla hispidula, commonly known as White Mountains horkelia, is a species of flowering plant in the rose family. It is endemic to the White Mountains, a small range of mountains that straddles the border between California and Nevada east of the Sierra Nevada. It is a resident of dry scrub and alpine and subalpine forest habitat.

== Description ==
Potentilla hispidula grows as a perennial herb producing a low mat of hairy, glandular greenish gray foliage about a woody base. The leaves are cylindrical and sometimes taper to a point, growing erect in a patch around the caudex. Each leaf is up to 10 centimeters long and is made up of crowded pairs of hairy leaflets. The inflorescence is an array of up to 15 flowers atop an erect stalk, each flower made up of five hairy, pointed, reflexed sepals and five white petals.
