= List of alpine climate locations =

Kasprowy Wierch, Poland

Climate chart (precipitation, max. and min. temperature)
| J | F | M | A | M | J | J | A | S | O | N | D |
| 105 −5 −10 | 98 −5 −11 | 113 −3 −9 | 127 1 −4 | 186 6 1 | 208 10 4 | 248 12 6 | 172 12 6 | 159 8 2 | 123 4 −1 | 118 0 −5 | 108 −4 −9 |
- █ Average max. and min. temperatures in °C
- █ Precipitation totals in mm
- Source: Institute of Meteorology and Water Management
Imperial conversion
| J | F | M | A | M | J | J | A | S | O | N | D |
| 4.1 24 14 | 3.9 23 13 | 4.4 26 16 | 5 34 25 | 7.3 43 33 | 8.2 50 39 | 9.8 54 43 | 6.8 54 44 | 6.2 46 36 | 4.9 39 30 | 4.6 32 23 | 4.2 26 16 |
- █ Average max. and min. temperatures in °F
- █ Precipitation totals in inches

A number of locations around the Earth have alpine climate. The climate of some of these locations is described, below.

For tropical oceanic locations, such as the summit of Mauna Loa, elev. 13,679 ft (4,169 m), the temperature is roughly constant throughout the year:

Climate data for Mauna Loa slope observatory (1961–1990), extremes 1955–2012
| Month | Jan | Feb | Mar | Apr | May | Jun | Jul | Aug | Sep | Oct | Nov | Dec | Year |
|---|---|---|---|---|---|---|---|---|---|---|---|---|---|
| Record high °F (°C) | 67 (19) | 85 (29) | 65 (18) | 67 (19) | 68 (20) | 71 (22) | 70 (21) | 68 (20) | 67 (19) | 66 (19) | 65 (18) | 67 (19) | 85 (29) |
| Mean daily maximum °F (°C) | 49.8 (9.9) | 49.6 (9.8) | 50.2 (10.1) | 51.8 (11.0) | 53.9 (12.2) | 57.2 (14.0) | 56.4 (13.6) | 56.3 (13.5) | 55.8 (13.2) | 54.7 (12.6) | 52.6 (11.4) | 50.6 (10.3) | 53.2 (11.8) |
| Mean daily minimum °F (°C) | 33.3 (0.7) | 32.9 (0.5) | 33.2 (0.7) | 34.6 (1.4) | 36.6 (2.6) | 39.4 (4.1) | 38.8 (3.8) | 38.9 (3.8) | 38.5 (3.6) | 37.8 (3.2) | 36.2 (2.3) | 34.3 (1.3) | 36.2 (2.3) |
| Record low °F (°C) | 19 (−7) | 18 (−8) | 20 (−7) | 24 (−4) | 27 (−3) | 28 (−2) | 26 (−3) | 28 (−2) | 29 (−2) | 27 (−3) | 25 (−4) | 22 (−6) | 18 (−8) |
| Average precipitation inches (mm) | 2.3 (58) | 1.5 (38) | 1.7 (43) | 1.3 (33) | 1.0 (25) | 0.5 (13) | 1.1 (28) | 1.5 (38) | 1.3 (33) | 1.1 (28) | 1.7 (43) | 2.0 (51) | 17 (431) |
| Average snowfall inches (cm) | 0.0 (0.0) | 1.0 (2.5) | 0.3 (0.76) | 1.3 (3.3) | 0.0 (0.0) | 0.0 (0.0) | 0.0 (0.0) | 0.0 (0.0) | 0.0 (0.0) | 0.0 (0.0) | 0.0 (0.0) | 1.0 (2.5) | 3.6 (9.06) |
| Average precipitation days (≥ 0.01 inch) | 4 | 5 | 6 | 5 | 4 | 3 | 4 | 5 | 5 | 5 | 5 | 4 | 55 |
Source: NOAA, WRCC

For mid-latitude locations, such as Mount Washington in New Hampshire, the temperature varies seasonally, but never gets very warm:

Climate data for Mount Washington, elev. 6,267 ft (1,910.2 m) near the summit (1991–2020 normals, extremes 1933–present)
| Month | Jan | Feb | Mar | Apr | May | Jun | Jul | Aug | Sep | Oct | Nov | Dec | Year |
|---|---|---|---|---|---|---|---|---|---|---|---|---|---|
| Record high °F (°C) | 48 (9) | 48 (9) | 54 (12) | 60 (16) | 66 (19) | 72 (22) | 71 (22) | 72 (22) | 69 (21) | 62 (17) | 52 (11) | 47 (8) | 72 (22) |
| Mean maximum °F (°C) | 38.7 (3.7) | 35.6 (2.0) | 40.8 (4.9) | 49.0 (9.4) | 58.8 (14.9) | 64.5 (18.1) | 65.4 (18.6) | 64.2 (17.9) | 61.4 (16.3) | 53.8 (12.1) | 45.8 (7.7) | 39.8 (4.3) | 67.2 (19.6) |
| Mean daily maximum °F (°C) | 14.9 (−9.5) | 14.8 (−9.6) | 20.8 (−6.2) | 30.7 (−0.7) | 42.5 (5.8) | 51.4 (10.8) | 55.3 (12.9) | 54.2 (12.3) | 49.1 (9.5) | 37.7 (3.2) | 28.4 (−2.0) | 20.1 (−6.6) | 35.0 (1.7) |
| Daily mean °F (°C) | 5.8 (−14.6) | 5.9 (−14.5) | 12.9 (−10.6) | 23.7 (−4.6) | 36.3 (2.4) | 45.5 (7.5) | 49.9 (9.9) | 48.7 (9.3) | 43.1 (6.2) | 31.3 (−0.4) | 20.8 (−6.2) | 11.8 (−11.2) | 28.0 (−2.2) |
| Mean daily minimum °F (°C) | −3.2 (−19.6) | −3.0 (−19.4) | 4.9 (−15.1) | 16.7 (−8.5) | 30.2 (−1.0) | 39.6 (4.2) | 44.5 (6.9) | 43.2 (6.2) | 37.1 (2.8) | 24.9 (−3.9) | 13.1 (−10.5) | 3.5 (−15.8) | 21.0 (−6.1) |
| Mean minimum °F (°C) | −28.6 (−33.7) | −25.2 (−31.8) | −19.4 (−28.6) | −1.1 (−18.4) | 14.0 (−10.0) | 25.7 (−3.5) | 34.4 (1.3) | 31.4 (−0.3) | 21.3 (−5.9) | 8.3 (−13.2) | −5.8 (−21.0) | −20.8 (−29.3) | −32.3 (−35.7) |
| Record low °F (°C) | −47 (−44) | −47 (−44) | −38 (−39) | −20 (−29) | −2 (−19) | 8 (−13) | 24 (−4) | 20 (−7) | 9 (−13) | −5 (−21) | −26 (−32) | −46 (−43) | −47 (−44) |
| Average precipitation inches (mm) | 5.74 (146) | 5.45 (138) | 6.72 (171) | 7.31 (186) | 7.68 (195) | 8.59 (218) | 8.93 (227) | 7.72 (196) | 7.66 (195) | 9.99 (254) | 8.09 (205) | 7.35 (187) | 91.23 (2,317) |
| Average snowfall inches (cm) | 41.4 (105) | 43.3 (110) | 46.2 (117) | 33.1 (84) | 12.9 (33) | 1.3 (3.3) | 0.0 (0.0) | 0.1 (0.25) | 1.2 (3.0) | 19.0 (48) | 35.6 (90) | 47.7 (121) | 281.8 (716) |
| Average extreme snow depth inches (cm) | 14.1 (36) | 16.3 (41) | 17.6 (45) | 14.5 (37) | 6.1 (15) | 0.5 (1.3) | 0.0 (0.0) | 0.0 (0.0) | 0.3 (0.76) | 5.7 (14) | 8.3 (21) | 12.7 (32) | 21.0 (53) |
| Average precipitation days (≥ 0.01 in) | 20.0 | 18.3 | 19.7 | 18.3 | 17.4 | 17.6 | 17.5 | 15.5 | 13.7 | 18.1 | 19.2 | 21.0 | 216.3 |
| Average snowy days (≥ 0.1 in) | 19.6 | 18.1 | 18.0 | 14.1 | 6.5 | 1.2 | 0.2 | 0.2 | 1.3 | 9.9 | 15.1 | 19.7 | 123.9 |
| Mean monthly sunshine hours | 92.0 | 106.9 | 127.6 | 143.2 | 171.3 | 151.3 | 145.0 | 130.5 | 127.2 | 127.1 | 82.4 | 83.1 | 1,487.6 |
| Percentage possible sunshine | 32 | 36 | 34 | 35 | 37 | 33 | 31 | 30 | 34 | 37 | 29 | 30 | 33 |
Source 1: NOAA (sun 1961–1990)
Source 2: Mount Washington Observatory (extremes 1933–present)

Other examples of alpine climate include

Sněžka, Poland/Czech Republic

Climate chart (precipitation, max. and min. temperature)
| J | F | M | A | M | J | J | A | S | O | N | D |
| 107 −3 −8 | 89 −4 −9 | 88 −2 −7 | 51 3 −2 | 78 7 2 | 98 11 5 | 121 13 8 | 95 13 8 | 87 8 4 | 80 5 0 | 83 1 −4 | 114 −2 −7 |
- █ Average max. and min. temperatures in °C
- █ Precipitation totals in mm
- Source: Institute of Meteorology and Water Management
Imperial conversion
| J | F | M | A | M | J | J | A | S | O | N | D |
| 4.2 26 17 | 3.5 25 17 | 3.5 29 20 | 2 37 28 | 3.1 45 36 | 3.9 51 42 | 4.7 55 46 | 3.8 55 46 | 3.4 47 39 | 3.1 40 32 | 3.3 34 25 | 4.5 28 19 |
- █ Average max. and min. temperatures in °F
- █ Precipitation totals in inches

Yu Shan, Taiwan

Climate chart (precipitation, max. and min. temperature)
| J | F | M | A | M | J | J | A | S | O | N | D |
| 83 4 −5 | 121 4 −4 | 139 5 −2 | 244 8 0 | 414 11 3 | 488 12 4 | 446 14 4 | 519 14 4 | 325 14 4 | 144 13 3 | 78 10 0 | 70 6 −3 |
- █ Average max. and min. temperatures in °C
- █ Precipitation totals in mm
- Source: Central Weather Bureau
Imperial conversion
| J | F | M | A | M | J | J | A | S | O | N | D |
| 3.3 39 24 | 4.7 39 25 | 5.5 42 29 | 9.6 46 33 | 16 51 37 | 19 54 40 | 18 57 40 | 20 56 40 | 13 57 39 | 5.7 56 37 | 3.1 50 33 | 2.8 43 27 |
- █ Average max. and min. temperatures in °F
- █ Precipitation totals in inches

Mount Apo, Philippines

Climate chart (precipitation, max. and min. temperature)
| J | F | M | A | M | J | J | A | S | O | N | D |
| 51 11 2 | 41 12 2 | 38 12 3 | 45 13 4 | 82 12 4 | 108 11 4 | 114 10 4 | 120 10 4 | 95 11 4 | 96 11 4 | 76 11 4 | 52 11 3 |
- █ Average max. and min. temperatures in °C
- █ Precipitation totals in mm
- Source: meteoblue.com
Imperial conversion
| J | F | M | A | M | J | J | A | S | O | N | D |
| 2 53 36 | 1.6 54 36 | 1.5 54 38 | 1.8 56 40 | 3.2 54 40 | 4.3 53 40 | 4.5 51 40 | 4.7 51 40 | 3.7 53 40 | 3.8 53 40 | 3 53 40 | 2 53 38 |
- █ Average max. and min. temperatures in °F
- █ Precipitation totals in inches

Phari, China

Climate chart (precipitation, max. and min. temperature)
| J | F | M | A | M | J | J | A | S | O | N | D |
| 5 1 −17 | 8.8 1 −15 | 22 4 −10 | 28 7 −6 | 31 10 −1 | 57 13 3 | 105 13 4 | 96 13 4 | 54 11 2 | 28 8 −5 | 4.5 5 −12 | 2.8 3 −16 |
- █ Average max. and min. temperatures in °C
- █ Precipitation totals in mm
- Source: Weather China
Imperial conversion
| J | F | M | A | M | J | J | A | S | O | N | D |
| 0.2 34 1 | 0.3 35 5 | 0.9 39 13 | 1.1 45 22 | 1.2 50 30 | 2.2 55 37 | 4.1 55 40 | 3.8 55 39 | 2.1 53 35 | 1.1 47 23 | 0.2 42 11 | 0.1 38 3 |
- █ Average max. and min. temperatures in °F
- █ Precipitation totals in inches

La Rinconada, Peru

Climate chart (precipitation, max. and min. temperature)
| J | F | M | A | M | J | J | A | S | O | N | D |
| 135 8 −3 | 113 8 −3 | 106 8 −3 | 50 9 −5 | 19 9 −8 | 7 8 −12 | 6 8 −11 | 15 10 −10 | 34 10 −7 | 51 11 −6 | 67 10 −6 | 104 9 −3 |
- █ Average max. and min. temperatures in °C
- █ Precipitation totals in mm
- Source: Climate-data.org
Imperial conversion
| J | F | M | A | M | J | J | A | S | O | N | D |
| 5.3 47 26 | 4.4 46 27 | 4.2 46 26 | 2 47 23 | 0.7 47 19 | 0.3 47 11 | 0.2 47 12 | 0.6 49 13 | 1.3 49 19 | 2 52 21 | 2.6 51 22 | 4.1 48 26 |
- █ Average max. and min. temperatures in °F
- █ Precipitation totals in inches

Nevado de Toluca, Mexico

Climate chart (precipitation, max. and min. temperature)
| J | F | M | A | M | J | J | A | S | O | N | D |
| 15 7 −3 | 13 8 −2 | 12 10 −1 | 56 10 0 | 116 10 0 | 205 9 1 | 244 8 1 | 228 8 0 | 208 8 0 | 88 8 0 | 27 7 −1 | 15 7 −2 |
- █ Average max. and min. temperatures in °C
- █ Precipitation totals in mm
- Source: Servicio Meteorológico Nacional
Imperial conversion
| J | F | M | A | M | J | J | A | S | O | N | D |
| 0.6 45 28 | 0.5 46 28 | 0.5 49 31 | 2.2 50 32 | 4.6 50 33 | 8.1 49 33 | 9.6 47 33 | 9 47 33 | 8.2 47 33 | 3.5 46 31 | 1.1 45 29 | 0.6 45 28 |
- █ Average max. and min. temperatures in °F
- █ Precipitation totals in inches

Zugspitze, Germany

Climate chart (precipitation, max. and min. temperature)
| J | F | M | A | M | J | J | A | S | O | N | D |
| 172 −8 −13 | 160 −8 −14 | 228 −7 −12 | 179 −4 −9 | 161 1 −5 | 186 4 −2 | 188 6 1 | 182 6 1 | 145 3 −2 | 114 1 −5 | 179 −4 −10 | 188 −7 −12 |
- █ Average max. and min. temperatures in °C
- █ Precipitation totals in mm
- Source: Météo Climat
Imperial conversion
| J | F | M | A | M | J | J | A | S | O | N | D |
| 6.8 19 9 | 6.3 17 7 | 9 20 10 | 7 25 15 | 6.3 34 24 | 7.3 39 29 | 7.4 43 33 | 7.2 43 33 | 5.7 38 28 | 4.5 33 24 | 7 24 15 | 7.4 20 10 |
- █ Average max. and min. temperatures in °F
- █ Precipitation totals in inches

Cerro de Pasco, Peru

Climate chart (precipitation, max. and min. temperature)
| J | F | M | A | M | J | J | A | S | O | N | D |
| 137 12 1 | 151 11 1 | 153 11 1 | 80 13 0 | 43 12 −2 | 14 13 −4 | 16 13 −4 | 26 13 −3 | 52 12 −2 | 98 12 −1 | 103 13 −1 | 126 13 0 |
- █ Average max. and min. temperatures in °C
- █ Precipitation totals in mm
- Source: Climate-data.org
Imperial conversion
| J | F | M | A | M | J | J | A | S | O | N | D |
| 5.4 53 33 | 5.9 52 34 | 6 53 33 | 3.1 55 31 | 1.7 54 28 | 0.6 55 25 | 0.6 55 25 | 1 55 26 | 2 54 29 | 3.9 54 31 | 4.1 55 31 | 5 55 32 |
- █ Average max. and min. temperatures in °F
- █ Precipitation totals in inches

Tanggulashan, China

Climate chart (precipitation, max. and min. temperature)
| J | F | M | A | M | J | J | A | S | O | N | D |
| 1.8 −6 −24 | 1.9 −4 −22 | 1.9 1 −17 | 5.3 5 −12 | 20 9 −6 | 60 13 0 | 81 15 2 | 65 14 2 | 44 11 −1 | 11 5 −10 | 1.1 −2 −19 | 1.2 −5 −24 |
- █ Average max. and min. temperatures in °C
- █ Precipitation totals in mm
- Source: China Meteorological Administration
Imperial conversion
| J | F | M | A | M | J | J | A | S | O | N | D |
| 0.1 20 −12 | 0.1 25 −7 | 0.1 33 2 | 0.2 41 11 | 0.8 49 22 | 2.4 55 31 | 3.2 59 36 | 2.6 58 36 | 1.7 52 30 | 0.4 40 15 | 0 29 −2 | 0 22 −10 |
- █ Average max. and min. temperatures in °F
- █ Precipitation totals in inches

Piz Corvatsch, Switzerland

Climate chart (precipitation, max. and min. temperature)
| J | F | M | A | M | J | J | A | S | O | N | D |
| 78 −9 −14 | 69 −9 −14 | 76 −8 −13 | 106 −5 −10 | 132 −1 −6 | 144 3 −2 | 135 5 0 | 135 5 1 | 100 2 −3 | 121 −1 −5 | 135 −5 −10 | 88 −8 −13 |
- █ Average max. and min. temperatures in °C
- █ Precipitation totals in mm
- Source: MeteoSwiss
Imperial conversion
| J | F | M | A | M | J | J | A | S | O | N | D |
| 3.1 17 8 | 2.7 15 6 | 3 18 9 | 4.2 22 14 | 5.2 30 22 | 5.7 37 29 | 5.3 42 32 | 5.3 42 33 | 3.9 35 27 | 4.8 30 22 | 5.3 22 14 | 3.5 18 9 |
- █ Average max. and min. temperatures in °F
- █ Precipitation totals in inches

White Mountain Peak, California, United States

Climate chart (precipitation, max. and min. temperature)
| J | F | M | A | M | J | J | A | S | O | N | D |
| 51 −5 −14 | 43 −5 −14 | 55 −4 −14 | 48 −2 −12 | 50 2 −7 | 21 8 −2 | 28 12 2 | 28 12 2 | 22 9 −1 | 26 4 −5 | 31 −1 −10 | 66 −4 −12 |
- █ Average max. and min. temperatures in °C
- █ Precipitation totals in mm
- Source: The Western Regional Climate Center
Imperial conversion
| J | F | M | A | M | J | J | A | S | O | N | D |
| 2 23 7 | 1.7 23 7 | 2.2 24 7 | 1.9 28 10 | 2 36 19 | 0.8 46 29 | 1.1 54 36 | 1.1 53 35 | 0.9 48 30 | 1 40 23 | 1.2 31 15 | 2.6 25 10 |
- █ Average max. and min. temperatures in °F
- █ Precipitation totals in inches
