= Boundary Peak Wilderness =

Protected area in Nevada, United States

- IUCN category Ib (wilderness area)
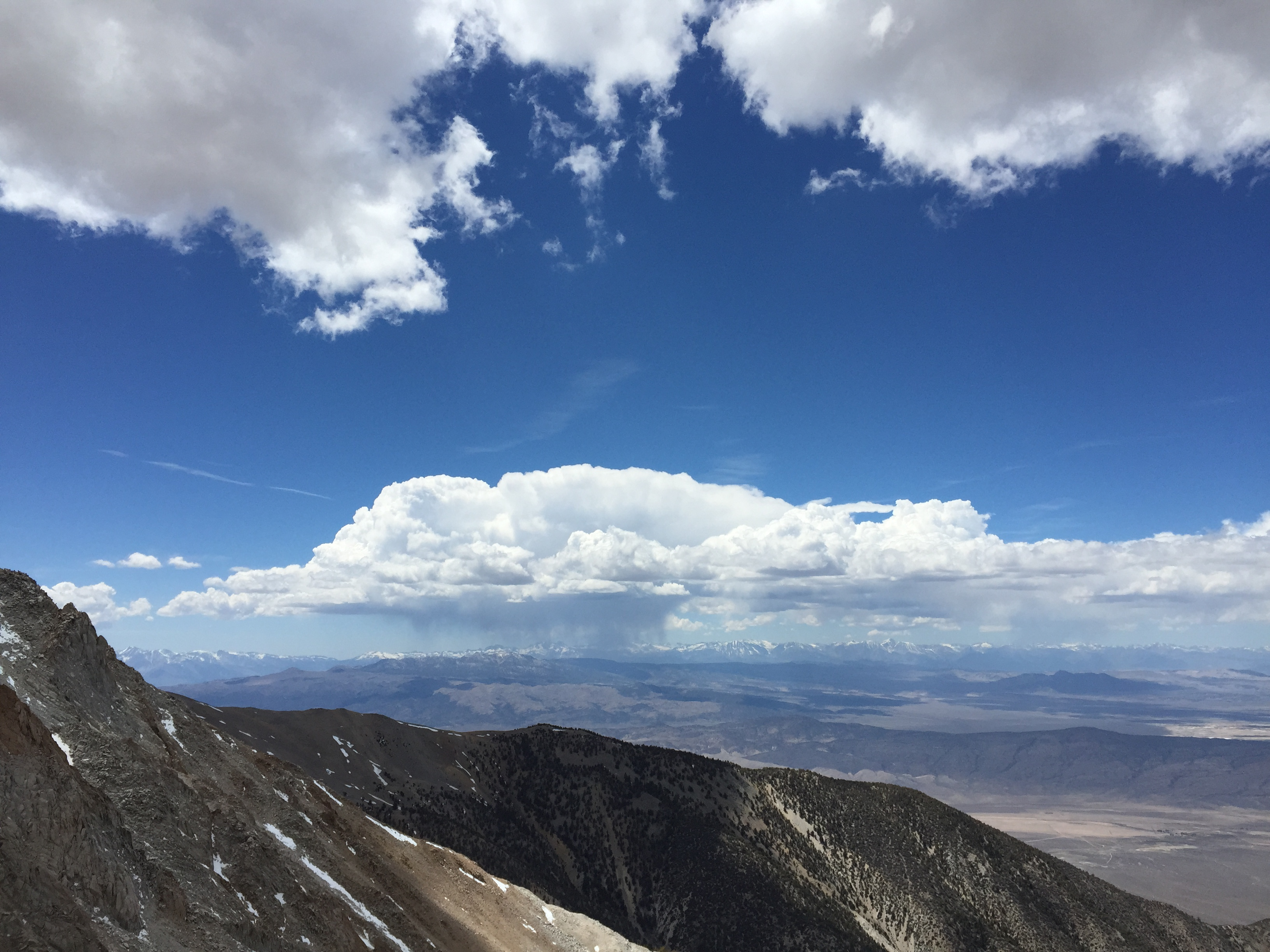
- View west toward the Sierra Nevada mountains

- Location within Nevada Location within the United States
- Interactive map of Boundary Peak Wilderness
- Location: Esmeralda County, Nevada, USA
- Nearest city: Bishop, CA
- Coordinates: 37°51′00″N 118°21′00″W
- Designated: 1989
- Governing body: U.S. Forest Service

The Boundary Peak Wilderness is a protected wilderness area in the White Mountains of Esmeralda County, in the western section of the state of Nevada in the western United States.

The wilderness covers an area of approximately 10,000 acres (40 km^{2}), and is administered by the Inyo National Forest. Boundary Peak, the highest point in Nevada, is the namesake and within the Boundary Peak Wilderness.
