= Benton Hot Springs =

Unincorporated community in California, United States

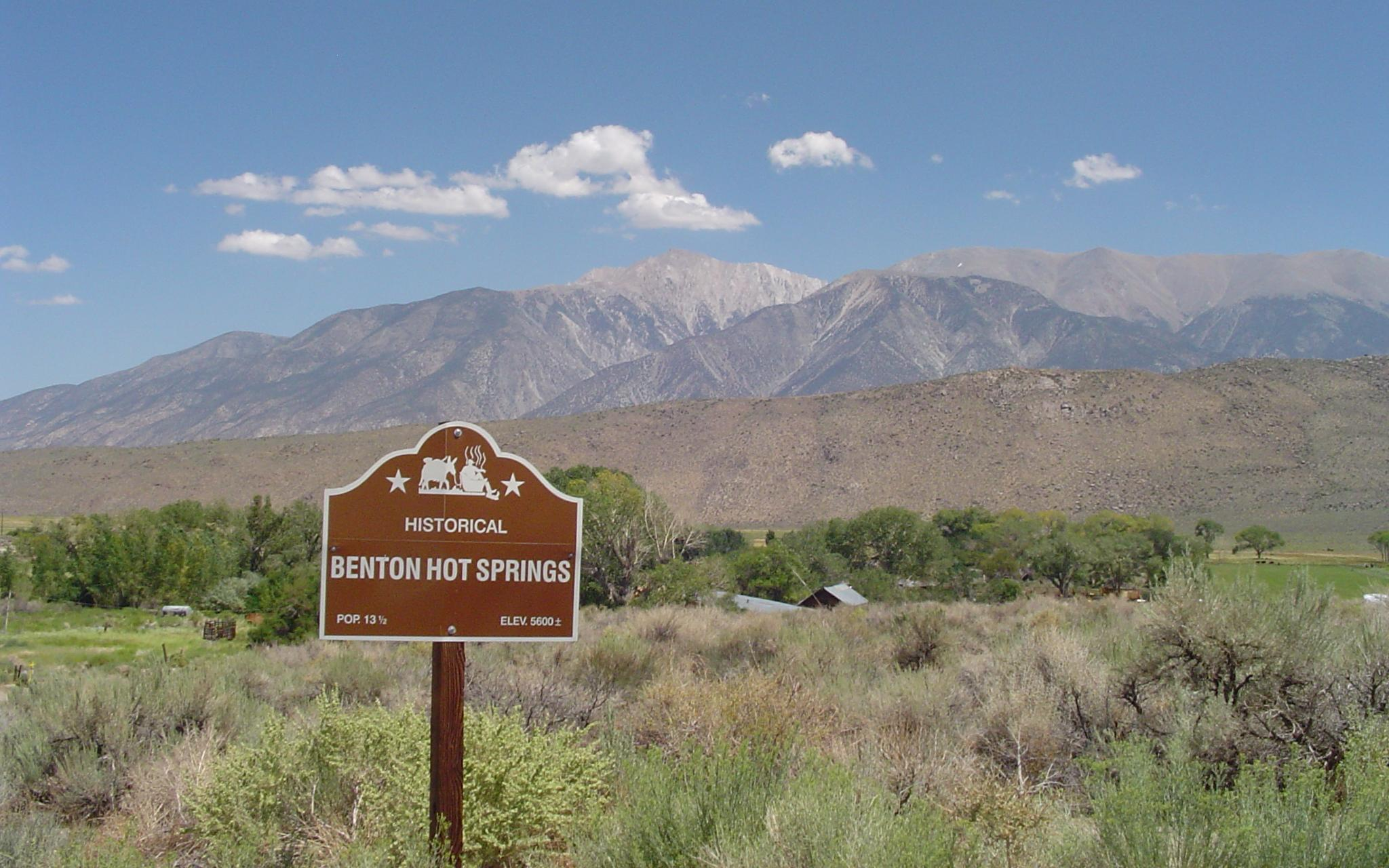
- Benton Hot Springs
- Interactive map of Benton Hot Springs
- Location: Mono County, California
- Coordinates: 37°48′01″N 118°31′44″W
- Elevation: 5,630 feet (1,720 m)

The Benton Hot Springs are in Mono County, California around which grew the town of Benton (also known as Old Benton, and Hot Springs). It is located 3 miles (4.8 km) west-southwest of Benton and 31 miles (50 km) north-northwest of Bishop, at an elevation of 5630 feet (1716 m). It is part of the Benton census-designated place for statistical purposes.

The Benton post office opened at the place in 1886. The name honors Senator Thomas Hart Benton, United States senator from Missouri. The town saw its heyday from 1862 to 1889 as a supply center for nearby mines. At the end of the 19th century, the town declined and the name Benton was transferred to Benton Station.

Of the springs at the site, one was described in a 1915 book as issuing water at 135 °F (57 °C).

== Nearby ==
Other springs are located nearby: Paert's Hot Springs and Taylor Springs, a little more than 1 mile (1.6 km) northeast of Benton Hot Springs.
