= Inyo National Forest =

National forest in California and Nevada, United States

- IUCN category Ib (wilderness area)
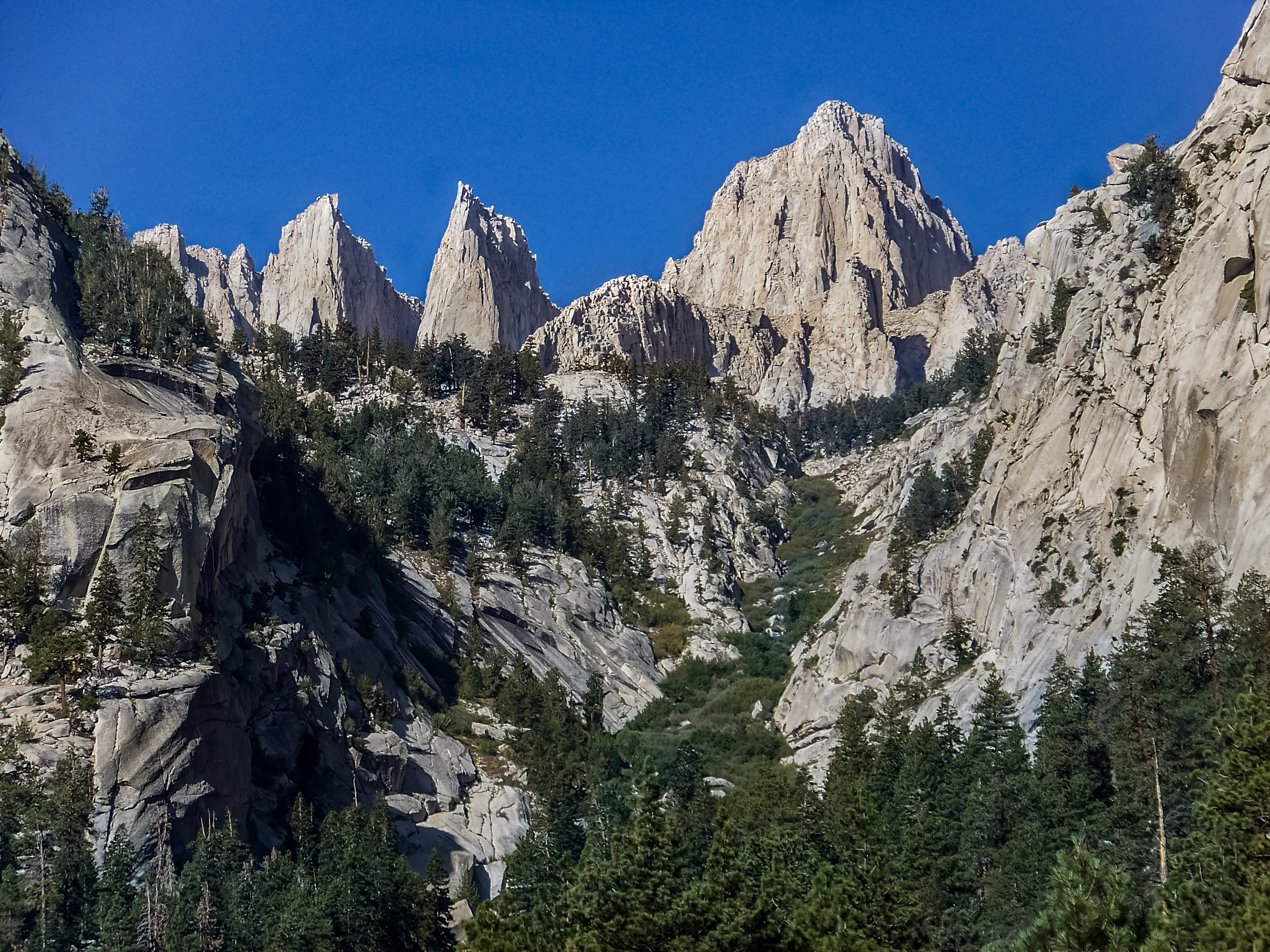
- Hikers can access Mount Whitney, highest point in the contiguous United States, through the Inyo National Forest
- Interactive map of Inyo National Forest
- Location: Eastern Sierra Nevada Range
- Nearest city: Bishop, California
- Coordinates: 37°50′N 118°59.5′W
- Area: 1,903,381 acres (7,702.71 km^{2})
- Established: May 25, 1907
- Governing body: U.S. Forest Service
- Website: Inyo National Forest

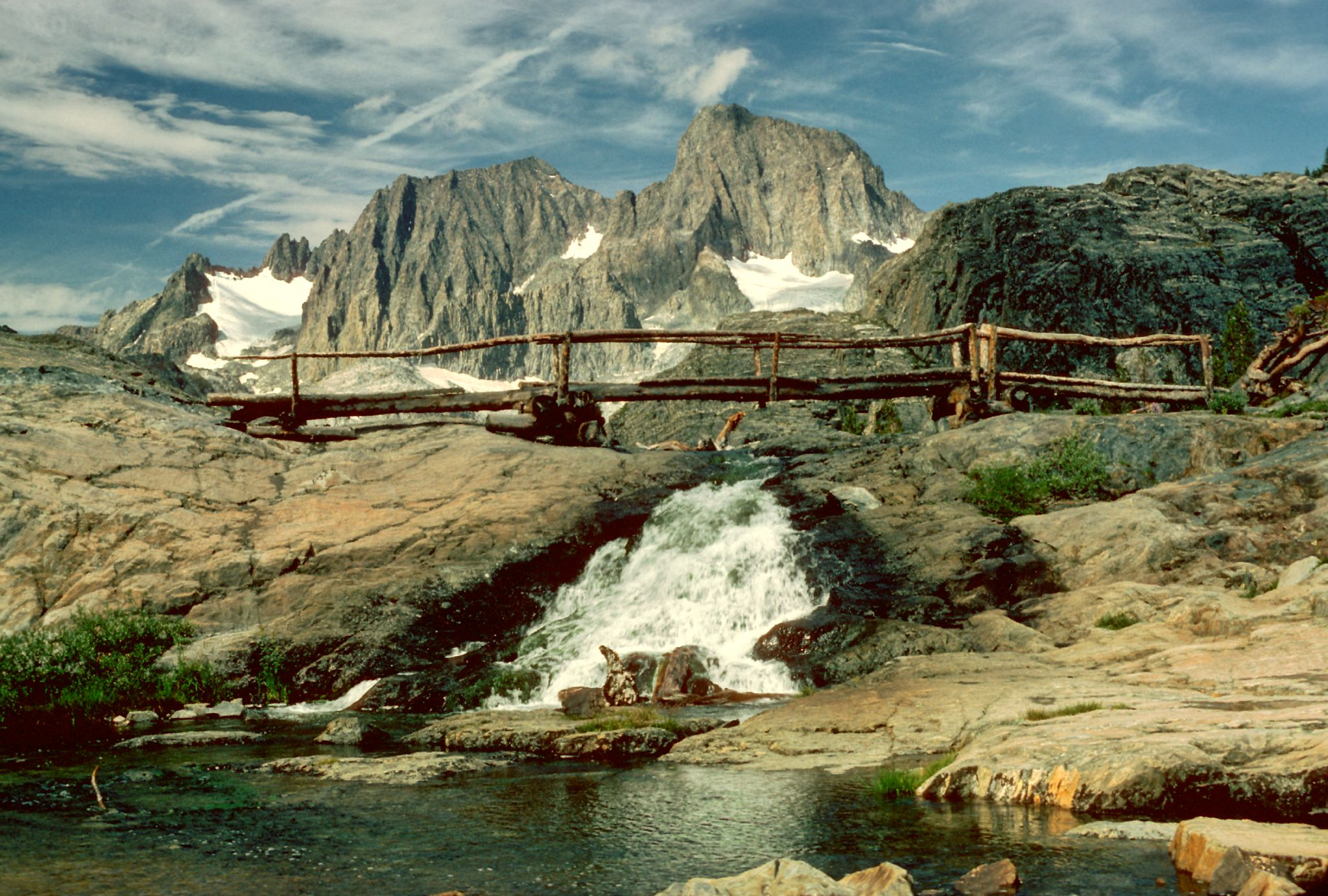
Mount Ritter and Banner Peak along the John Muir Trail

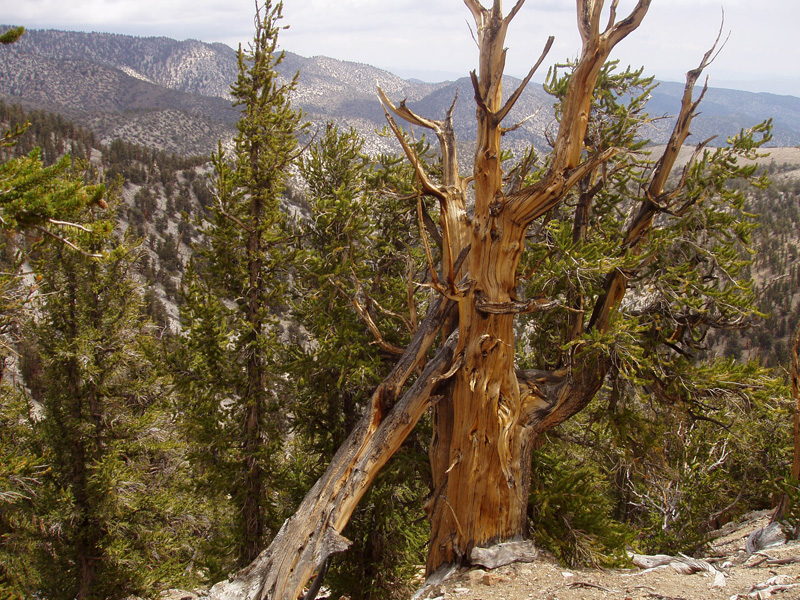
The Schulman grove of Bristlecone pines

Inyo National Forest is a United States National Forest covering parts of the eastern Sierra Nevada of California and the White Mountains of California and Nevada. The forest hosts several superlatives, including Mount Whitney, the highest point in the contiguous United States; Boundary Peak, the highest point in Nevada; and the Ancient Bristlecone Pine Forest, which protects the oldest living trees in the world. The forest, encompassing much of the Owens Valley, was established by Theodore Roosevelt as a way of sectioning off land to accommodate the Los Angeles Aqueduct project in 1907, making the Inyo National Forest one of the least wooded forests in the U.S. National Forest system.

== Geography ==
The forest covers 1,903,381 acres (2,974 mi^{2}; 7,703 km^{2}) and includes nine designated wilderness areas which protect over 800,000 acres (1,200 mi^{2}; 3,200 km^{2}). Most of the forest is in California, but it includes about 60,700 acres (95 mi^{2}; 246 km^{2}) in western Nevada. It stretches from the eastern side of Yosemite to south of Sequoia National Park. Geographically it is split in two, one on each side of the Long Valley Caldera and Owens Valley.

The forest has a wide elevation range, from 4,000 ft (1,200 m) in the Owens Valley to 14,505 ft (4,421 m) at the summit of Mount Whitney.

The John Muir Wilderness is a part of the Inyo National Forest and abuts Sequoia and Kings Canyon National Park along the crest of the Sierra. The northern part of the Inyo National Forest is preserved as a part of the Ansel Adams Wilderness area, which borders Yosemite National Park. Together, the wilderness areas and parks form one contiguous area of protected wilderness of more than 1.5 million acres (6,100 km^{2}).

The Inyo National Forest was named after Inyo County, California, in which much of the forest resides. The name "Inyo" comes from a Native American word meaning "dwelling place of the great spirit".

The forest spans parts of Inyo, Mono, Tulare, Fresno and Madera counties in California, and Esmeralda and Mineral counties in Nevada.

The forest's headquarters are in Bishop, California, with ranger district offices in Bishop, Lee Vining, Lone Pine, and Mammoth Lakes. The forest was established on May 25, 1907. On July 1, 1945, land from the former Mono National Forest was added.

=== Wilderness areas ===
There are nine wilderness areas lying within Inyo NF that are part of the National Wilderness Preservation System. Some of these extend into other National Forests, as indicated:

- Ansel Adams Wilderness (mostly in Sierra NF and partly in Devils Postpile NM)
- Boundary Peak Wilderness
- Golden Trout Wilderness (partly in Sequoia National Forest)
- Hoover Wilderness (mostly in Toiyabe NF)
- Inyo Mountains Wilderness
- John Muir Wilderness (mostly in Sierra NF)
- Owens River Headwaters Wilderness
- South Sierra Wilderness (partly in Sequoia NF)
- White Mountains Wilderness

=== Climate ===
This data set from South Lake in the eastern part of the forest 20 miles (32 km) west of Bishop shows common climate trends at the middle elevation of the forest at 9,630 ft (2,940 m). The Köppen climate classification subtype for this climate is "Dsc" or continental subarctic climate.

Climate data for South Lake, California (37°10′N 118°34′W), 9,630 ft (2,940 m) elevation, period 1924-2016
Month	Jan	Feb	Mar	Apr	May	Jun	Jul	Aug	Sep	Oct	Nov	Dec	Year
Mean daily maximum °F (°C)	38.7 (3.7)	38.0 (3.3)	42.0 (5.6)	47.0 (8.3)	52.6 (11.4)	61.5 (16.4)	69.3 (20.7)	68.3 (20.2)	62.1 (16.7)	52.7 (11.5)	45.2 (7.3)	39.5 (4.2)	51.4 (10.8)
Mean daily minimum °F (°C)	12.5 (−10.8)	11.8 (−11.2)	15.0 (−9.4)	21.9 (−5.6)	30.0 (−1.1)	38.4 (3.6)	45.3 (7.4)	44.1 (6.7)	37.8 (3.2)	29.8 (−1.2)	23.2 (−4.9)	16.3 (−8.7)	27.2 (−2.7)
Average precipitation inches (mm)	2.63 (67)	3.39 (86)	2.41 (61)	1.51 (38)	0.74 (19)	0.55 (14)	0.61 (15)	0.73 (19)	0.85 (22)	0.95 (24)	1.58 (40)	2.49 (63)	18.44 (468)
Average snowfall inches (cm)	22.5 (57)	32.9 (84)	23.6 (60)	17.0 (43)	4.3 (11)	2.7 (6.9)	0.0 (0.0)	0.6 (1.5)	0.5 (1.3)	6.3 (16)	14.3 (36)	27.1 (69)	151.8 (385.7)
Average extreme snow depth inches (cm)	21 (53)	35 (89)	35 (89)	25 (64)	7 (18)	0 (0)	0 (0)	0 (0)	0 (0)	1 (2.5)	3 (7.6)	12 (30)	12 (30)
Source: WRCC

== Ecology ==
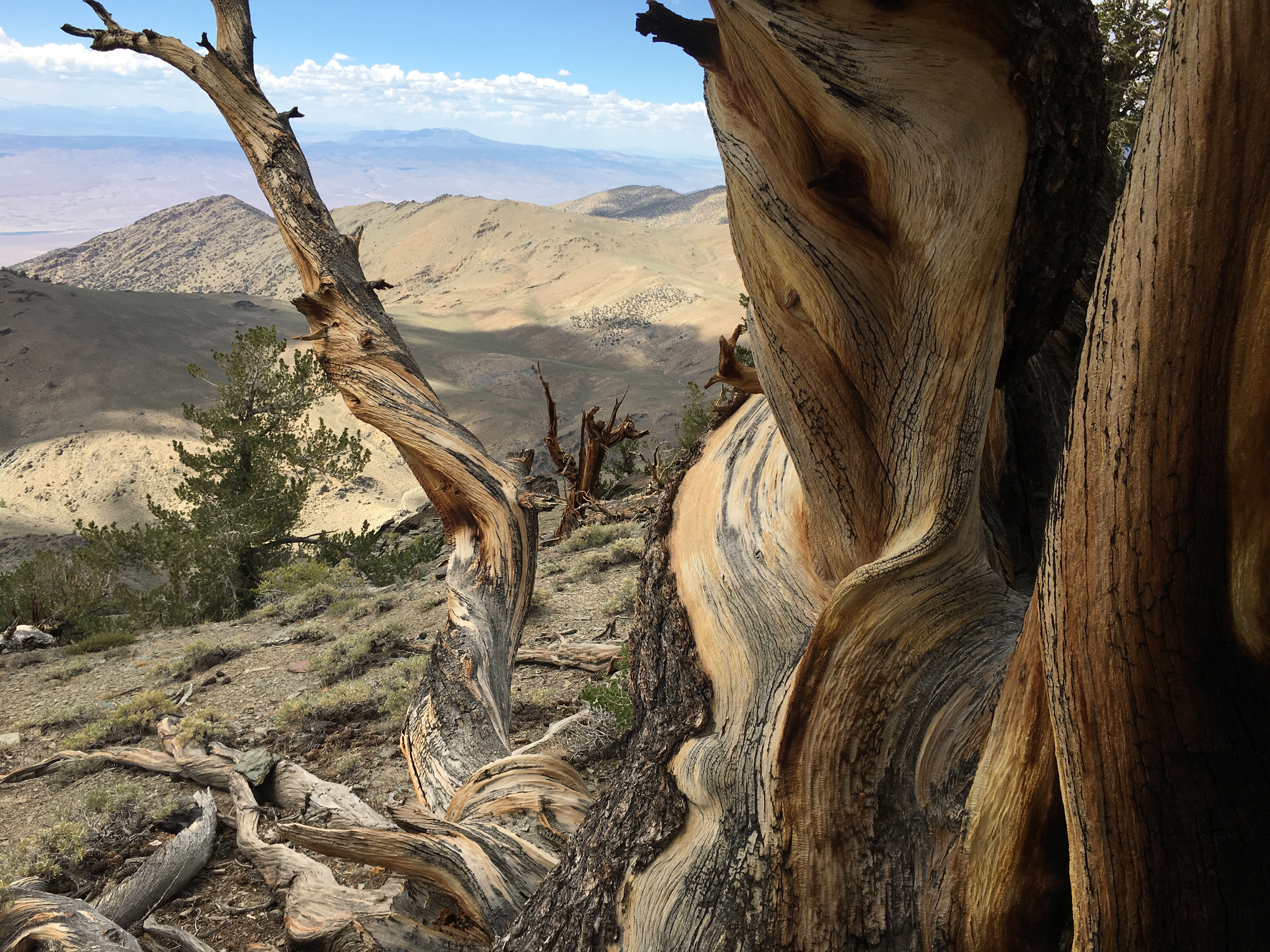
Ancient Bristlecone Pine Forest at 11,000 ft (3,400 m) elevation

The Inyo National Forest contains the Ancient Bristlecone Pine Forest, which protects specimens of Great Basin bristlecone pines (Pinus longaeva). One of these bristlecone pines is "Methuselah", the second oldest known non-clonal living tree on earth at more than 4,839 years old. An older bristlecone pine was reportedly discovered by Tom Harlan in 2009, based on a sample core collected in 1957. According to Harlan, the tree was 5,062 years old and still living in 2010. Neither the tree nor the sample core could be located after Harlan's death in 2013.

The forest also harbors an estimated 238,000 acres (963 km^{2}) of old-growth forests. The most abundant trees in these forests are lodgepole pine (Pinus contorta) and Jeffrey pine (Pinus jeffreyi).

== Filming location ==
Many movies and television series have been filmed in the Inyo National Forest. Some are Ride the High Country (1962) starring Randolph Scott and Joel McCrea, Nevada Smith (1966) starring Steve McQueen, Will Penny (1968) starring Charlton Heston, Joe Kidd (1972) and High Plains Drifter (1973) starring Clint Eastwood, and the sci-fi film Star Trek: Insurrection (1998).

Inyo National Forest also served as the filming location for the second half of the second episode in the BBC's Walking with Monsters (2005) documentary series, which was set in Early Permian Germany.

== Destinations ==
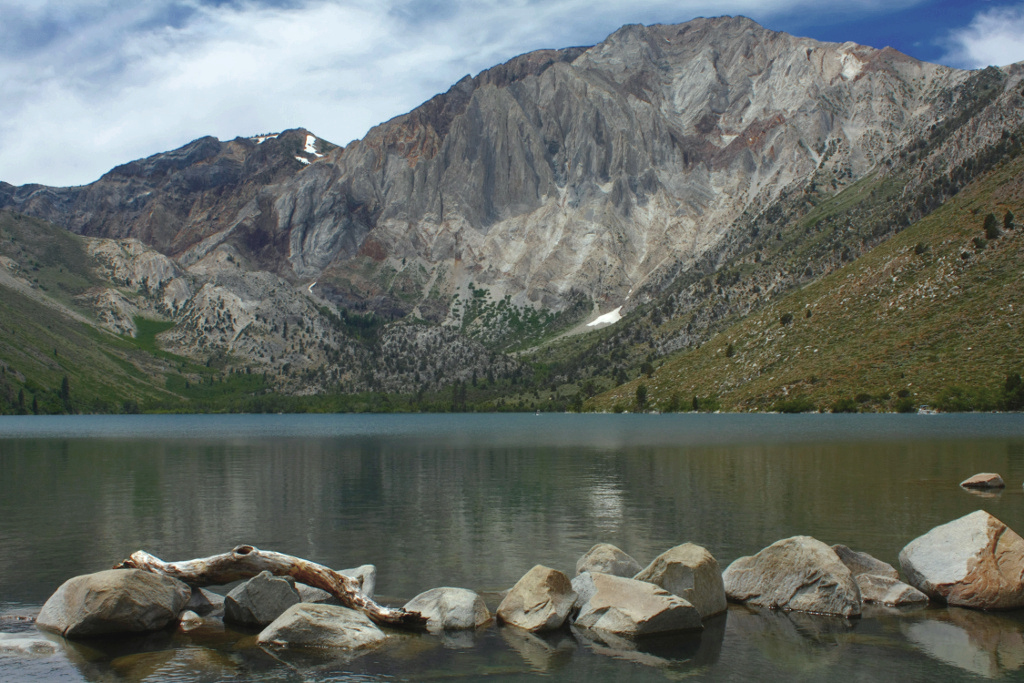
Convict Lake and Laurel Mountain

Popular within Inyo National Forest are:

- Ancient Bristlecone Pine Forest
- Convict Lake
- June Lake
- Lake Sabrina
- Lone Pine
- Mammoth Lakes
- Mono Lake
- Mono-Inyo Craters
- Mount Whitney
- Tioga Lake
- Tioga Pass
- Westgard Pass

== See also ==
- List of national forests of the United States
- Devils Postpile National Monument – National monument in California, United States
