= Boundary Peak (Nevada) =

Highest natural point in Nevada, U.S.

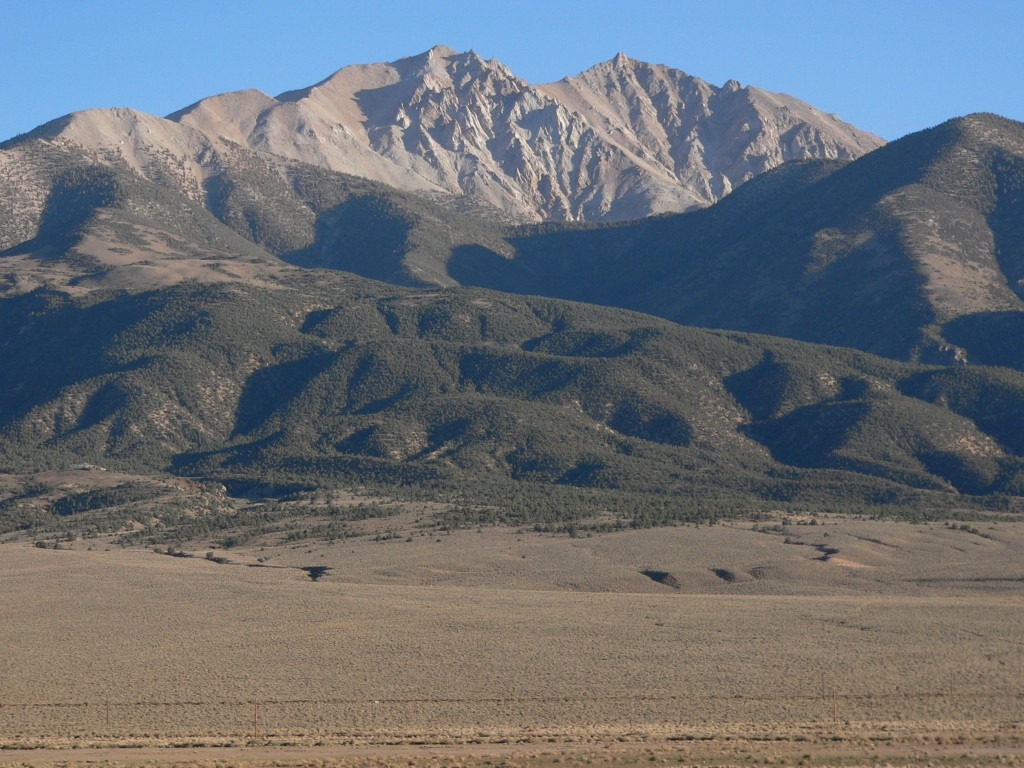
- Boundary Peak as seen from Benton. Boundary is on the left (east), while connecting to higher Montgomery Peak on the right (west)

Highest point
- Elevation: 13,147 ft (4,007 m) NAVD 88
- Prominence: 253 ft (77 m)
- Isolation: 0.86 km (0.53 mi)
- Listing: U.S. state high point 9th; Nevada county high points 1st; Desert Peaks Section
- Coordinates: 37°50′46″N 118°21′05″W

Geography
- Location within Nevada
- Location: Esmeralda County, Nevada, U.S.
- Parent range: White Mountains
- Topo map: USGS Boundary Peak

Geology
- Rock age: Cretaceous
- Mountain type: Quartz monzonite

Climbing
- Easiest route: Scramble, class 2

Boundary Peak is a mountain in Esmeralda County, Nevada, United States. With a peak elevation of 13,147 feet (4,007 m), it is the highest natural point in the state of Nevada.

== Geography ==
Boundary Peak is the northernmost peak of 13,000 feet or greater elevation within the White Mountains. The summit is located in Esmeralda County of southwestern Nevada, and is within the Boundary Peak Wilderness of the Inyo National Forest. It is less than half a mile (1 km) from the California state line, which is how it derived its name.

While it is the highest point in Nevada, the considerably taller Montgomery Peak (13,441 feet or 4,097 metres) is less than 1 mi (1.6 km) away, across the state line in California. By most definitions Boundary Peak, which has a prominence of only 253 ft (77 m), is considered to be a sub-peak of Montgomery Peak.

Boundary Peak is only 82 feet (25 m) taller than Wheeler Peak, which is located in Great Basin National Park, White Pine County in eastern Nevada. By most definitions, Wheeler Peak is the tallest independent mountain within Nevada.

=== Climate ===
Climate data for Boundary Peak 37.8358 N, 118.3558 W, Elevation: 12,651 ft (3,856 m) (1991–2020 normals)
Month	Jan	Feb	Mar	Apr	May	Jun	Jul	Aug	Sep	Oct	Nov	Dec	Year
Mean daily maximum °F (°C)	26.6 (−3.0)	23.8 (−4.6)	27.2 (−2.7)	30.9 (−0.6)	39.0 (3.9)	51.6 (10.9)	59.4 (15.2)	58.5 (14.7)	50.5 (10.3)	41.4 (5.2)	33.0 (0.6)	25.6 (−3.6)	39.0 (3.9)
Daily mean °F (°C)	17.8 (−7.9)	15.3 (−9.3)	18.1 (−7.7)	21.3 (−5.9)	27.6 (−2.4)	38.2 (3.4)	45.3 (7.4)	44.4 (6.9)	39.7 (4.3)	31.8 (−0.1)	24.0 (−4.4)	17.5 (−8.1)	28.4 (−2.0)
Mean daily minimum °F (°C)	9.1 (−12.7)	6.7 (−14.1)	9.1 (−12.7)	11.7 (−11.3)	16.3 (−8.7)	24.8 (−4.0)	31.1 (−0.5)	30.2 (−1.0)	28.9 (−1.7)	22.2 (−5.4)	15.1 (−9.4)	9.4 (−12.6)	17.9 (−7.8)
Average precipitation inches (mm)	1.81 (46)	2.34 (59)	2.48 (63)	1.49 (38)	1.90 (48)	0.62 (16)	0.93 (24)	0.96 (24)	0.46 (12)	1.12 (28)	0.72 (18)	2.26 (57)	17.09 (433)
Source: PRISM Climate Group

== Climbing ==
This peak is most often climbed from the Nevada side. From there, a climber may scramble the ridge connecting to Montgomery Peak. It is recommended that the U.S. Forest Service (Inyo National Forest) be contacted so they can provide climbing information.

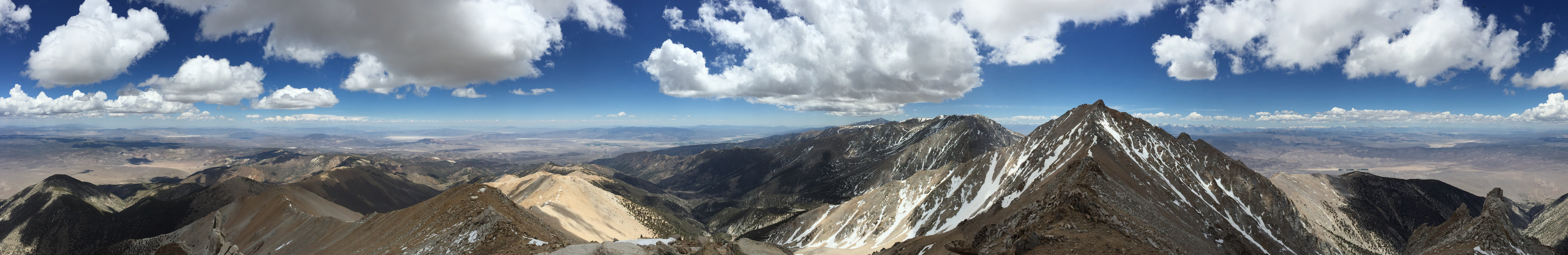
360-degree panorama from the summit of Boundary Peak

== See also ==
- List of highest points in Nevada by county
- List of U.S. states by elevation
