= White Mountain Peak =

Mountain in California, United States

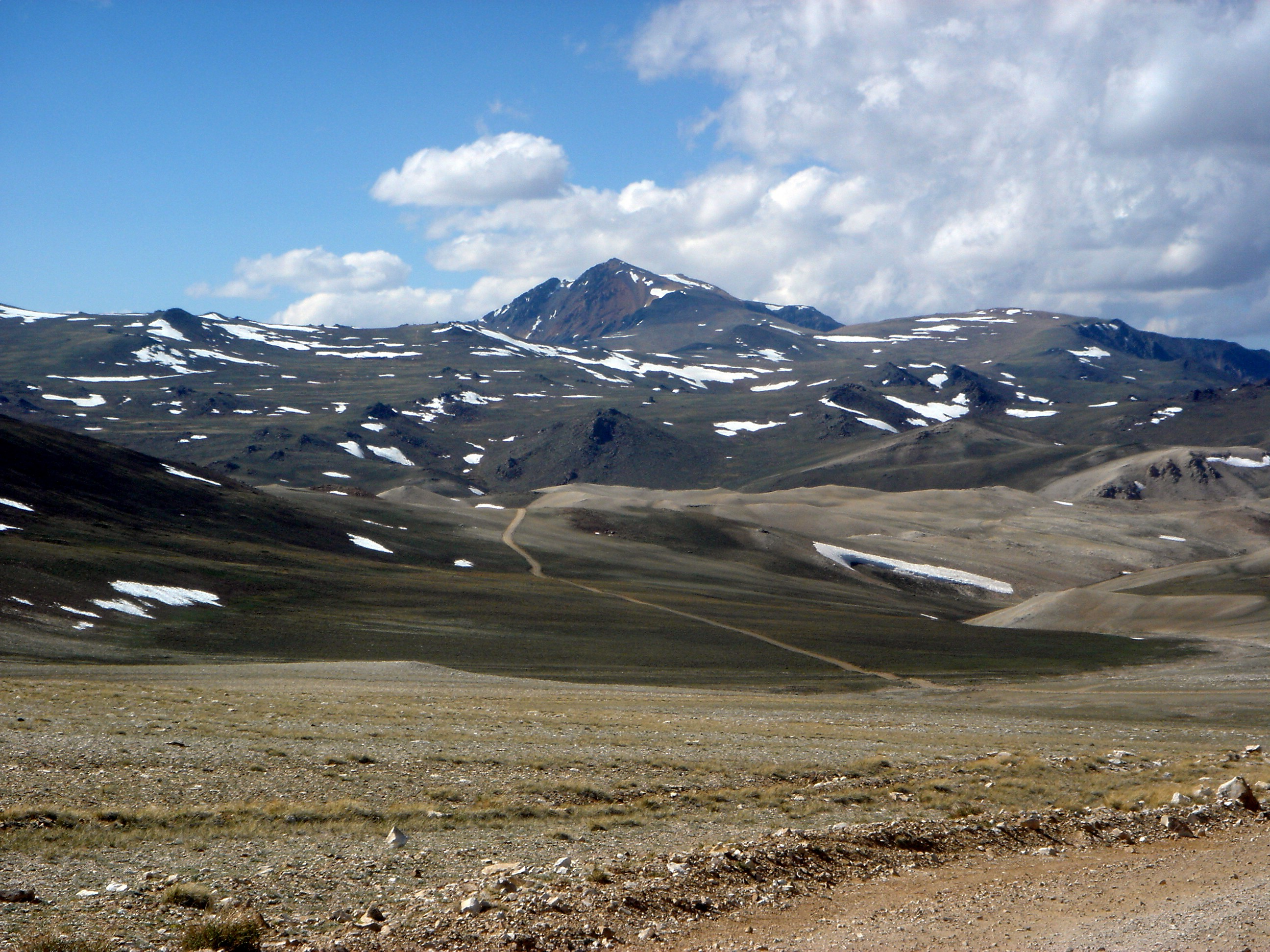
- White Mountain Peak from trail, June 2004

Highest point
- Elevation: 14,252 ft (4,344 m) NAVD 88
- Prominence: 7,196 ft (2,193 m)
- Parent peak: Mount Whitney
- Isolation: 67.4 mi (108.5 km)
- Listing: North America highest peaks 44th; North America prominent peak 67th; U.S. highest major peaks 30th; California highest major peaks 3rd; California county high points 3rd; Ultra
- Coordinates: 37°38′03″N 118°15′20″W

Geography
- Location within California Location within the United States
- Location: Mono County, California, U.S.
- Parent range: White Mountains
- Topo map: USGS White Mountain Peak

Geology
- Mountain type: Igneous Rock

Climbing
- Easiest route: Road hike

White Mountain Peak (or simply White Mountain), at 14,252 feet (4,344 m), is the highest peak in the White Mountains of California, the highest peak in Mono County, and the third highest peak in the state after Mount Whitney and Mount Williamson. Despite its name, the summit block of the peak has large swaths of very dark and colorful orange scree and rock; it is composed of Mesozoic metavolcanic rock, which is igneous rock altered by rising granite.

It is the fourteenth most topographically prominent peak in the contiguous United States. White Mountain Peak is one of only two fourteeners (peaks above 14,000 feet) in California that are not in the Sierra Nevada, the other being Mount Shasta at the far northern end of the state in the Cascade Range. It is the only fourteener in the contiguous United States that is not in the Rocky Mountains, the Cascade Range, or the Sierra Nevada. It is in the Inyo-White Mountains.

== Research Station ==
The University of California operates the White Mountain Research Center, comprising three high altitude research stations, on the mountain: Crooked Creek Station at 10,200 feet (3,100 m), Barcroft Station at 12,470 feet (3,800 m), and a small hut at the summit. The effects of altitude on physiology are studied at the Barcroft Station and summit hut.

== Climbing ==
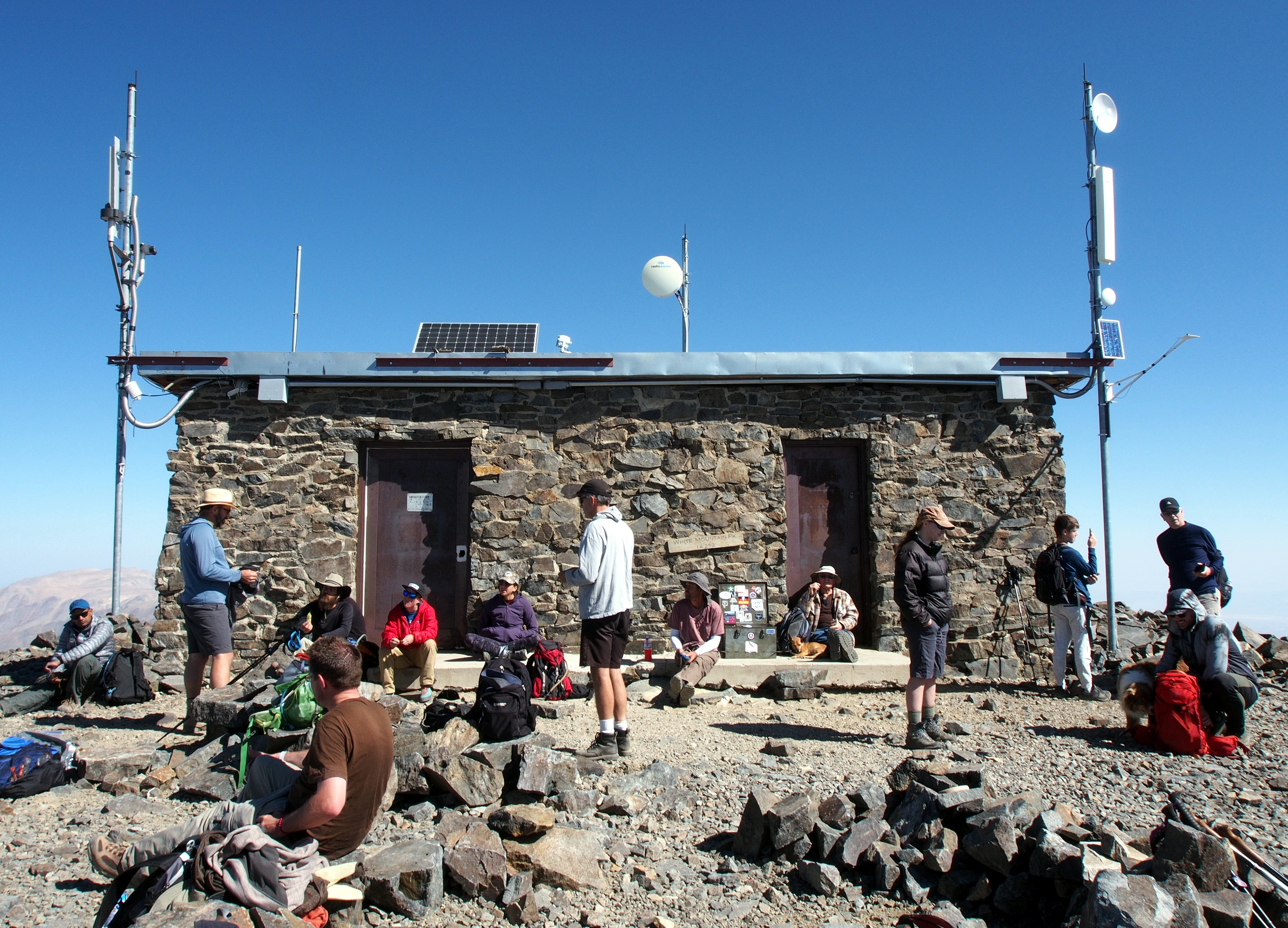
Hikers resting at the summit hut on the 2018 open gate day

There is a winding dirt road leading to the summit station that is usually cleared of snow between late June and September. Access is restricted to hikers only by a locked gate about 2 miles before Barcroft Station, but White Mountain Research Station usually opens this locked gate at 11,680 feet (3,560 m) once each year. Open gate days are typically held on a Sunday in the summer season.

The round-trip hike from the gate to the summit is about 14 miles (23 km) with less than 2,600 feet (800 m) of vertical gain. However, there are two dips in the trail, each about 250 feet long, adding up to a total elevation gain of over 3500 feet during the round trip. The open gate shaves about 4 miles (6 km) and 790 feet (240 m) of gain off the round trip. This route is popular with mountain bikers.

While the peak is arguably California's easiest fourteener via the jeep road, it features more strenuous climbs such as its western ridge, an 8,150-foot (2,500 m) climb out of Owens Valley via a steep ridge from the end of a rough road. Another route from the East, up Wyman Canyon from the Deep Springs Valley, has many water sources within the first 12 miles. It climbs 7,100 feet to the summit. The peak is rarely approached from the north, where it is guarded by a narrow arête or knife-edge ridge. A better nontechnical alternative to the jeep road would be to drive as far as possible up Leidy Canyon from Fish Lake Valley, then take a graded cattle trail up the broad ridge to Perry Aiken Flat.

From the flats, it is an easy traverse south into the cirque of the North Fork, North Branch of Perry Aiken Creek. A moderate scramble up the ridge between the North Branch and the larger cirque of the main North Fork leads to the easier upper slopes of the peak. While the peak does not require technical climbing skills, hikers still find it challenging because of the high altitude.

== Climate ==
The summit and the weather station at 12,470 feet (3,800 m) have an alpine tundra climate (Köppen climate classification: ET). Winters are extremely severe, with the peak receiving upwards of 13 feet (400 cm) of snow annually.

Climate data for White Mountain Peak 37.6357 N, 118.2579 W, Elevation: 13,717 ft (4,181 m) (1991–2020 normals)
Month	Jan	Feb	Mar	Apr	May	Jun	Jul	Aug	Sep	Oct	Nov	Dec	Year
Mean daily maximum °F (°C)	22.2 (−5.4)	19.2 (−7.1)	23.9 (−4.5)	27.4 (−2.6)	34.9 (1.6)	48.0 (8.9)	55.6 (13.1)	54.7 (12.6)	47.1 (8.4)	39.2 (4.0)	29.0 (−1.7)	23.3 (−4.8)	35.4 (1.9)
Daily mean °F (°C)	15.2 (−9.3)	12.3 (−10.9)	16.1 (−8.8)	16.9 (−8.4)	23.6 (−4.7)	34.4 (1.3)	41.3 (5.2)	40.4 (4.7)	38.1 (3.4)	28.2 (−2.1)	21.5 (−5.8)	15.3 (−9.3)	25.3 (−3.7)
Mean daily minimum °F (°C)	8.1 (−13.3)	5.4 (−14.8)	8.4 (−13.1)	6.4 (−14.2)	12.3 (−10.9)	20.8 (−6.2)	26.9 (−2.8)	26.1 (−3.3)	29.0 (−1.7)	17.1 (−8.3)	14.0 (−10.0)	7.4 (−13.7)	15.2 (−9.4)
Average precipitation inches (mm)	3.88 (99)	3.27 (83)	3.20 (81)	1.81 (46)	1.48 (38)	0.74 (19)	1.03 (26)	1.06 (27)	0.50 (13)	1.70 (43)	0.89 (23)	3.20 (81)	22.76 (579)
Source: PRISM Climate Group

Climate data for White Mountain, California (Station Elevation 12,470ft)
Month	Jan	Feb	Mar	Apr	May	Jun	Jul	Aug	Sep	Oct	Nov	Dec	Year
Record high °F (°C)	47 (8)	52 (11)	46 (8)	50 (10)	59 (15)	66 (19)	72 (22)	73 (23)	61 (16)	69 (21)	50 (10)	48 (9)	73 (23)
Mean daily maximum °F (°C)	22.9 (−5.1)	23.0 (−5.0)	24.3 (−4.3)	28.3 (−2.1)	36.3 (2.4)	46.3 (7.9)	54.2 (12.3)	53.0 (11.7)	47.6 (8.7)	39.9 (4.4)	30.9 (−0.6)	25.4 (−3.7)	36.0 (2.2)
Daily mean °F (°C)	15.2 (−9.3)	14.8 (−9.6)	15.6 (−9.1)	19.1 (−7.2)	27.5 (−2.5)	37.5 (3.1)	45.3 (7.4)	44.4 (6.9)	38.8 (3.8)	31.4 (−0.3)	22.8 (−5.1)	17.6 (−8.0)	27.5 (−2.5)
Mean daily minimum °F (°C)	7.4 (−13.7)	6.6 (−14.1)	6.8 (−14.0)	9.9 (−12.3)	18.7 (−7.4)	28.7 (−1.8)	36.4 (2.4)	35.5 (1.9)	30.0 (−1.1)	22.9 (−5.1)	14.7 (−9.6)	9.7 (−12.4)	18.9 (−7.3)
Record low °F (°C)	−25 (−32)	−21 (−29)	−35 (−37)	−30 (−34)	−15 (−26)	2 (−17)	12 (−11)	13 (−11)	−5 (−21)	−20 (−29)	−28 (−33)	−30 (−34)	−35 (−37)
Average precipitation inches (mm)	2.00 (51)	1.70 (43)	2.17 (55)	1.88 (48)	1.98 (50)	0.82 (21)	1.09 (28)	1.11 (28)	0.87 (22)	1.02 (26)	1.22 (31)	2.60 (66)	18.47 (469)
Average snowfall inches (cm)	20.2 (51)	19.5 (50)	19.5 (50)	20.8 (53)	21.5 (55)	7.0 (18)	1.3 (3.3)	1.0 (2.5)	3.5 (8.9)	10.9 (28)	13.1 (33)	20.3 (52)	158.5 (403)
Source 1: The Western Regional Climate Center
Source 2: https://wrcc.dri.edu/cgi-bin/cliGCStT.pl?cawhit

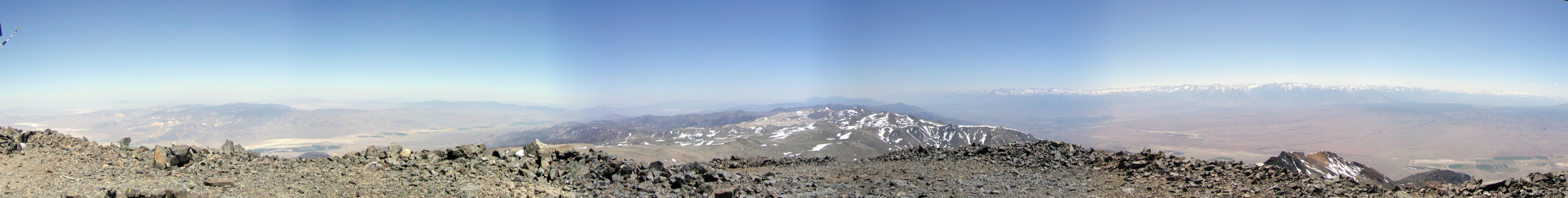
Panorama from top of White Mountain looking to the east, south and west

== See also ==
- List of mountain peaks of California
- List of highest points in California by county
- List of Ultras of the United States
