= White Mountains (California) =

Mountain range in California, United States

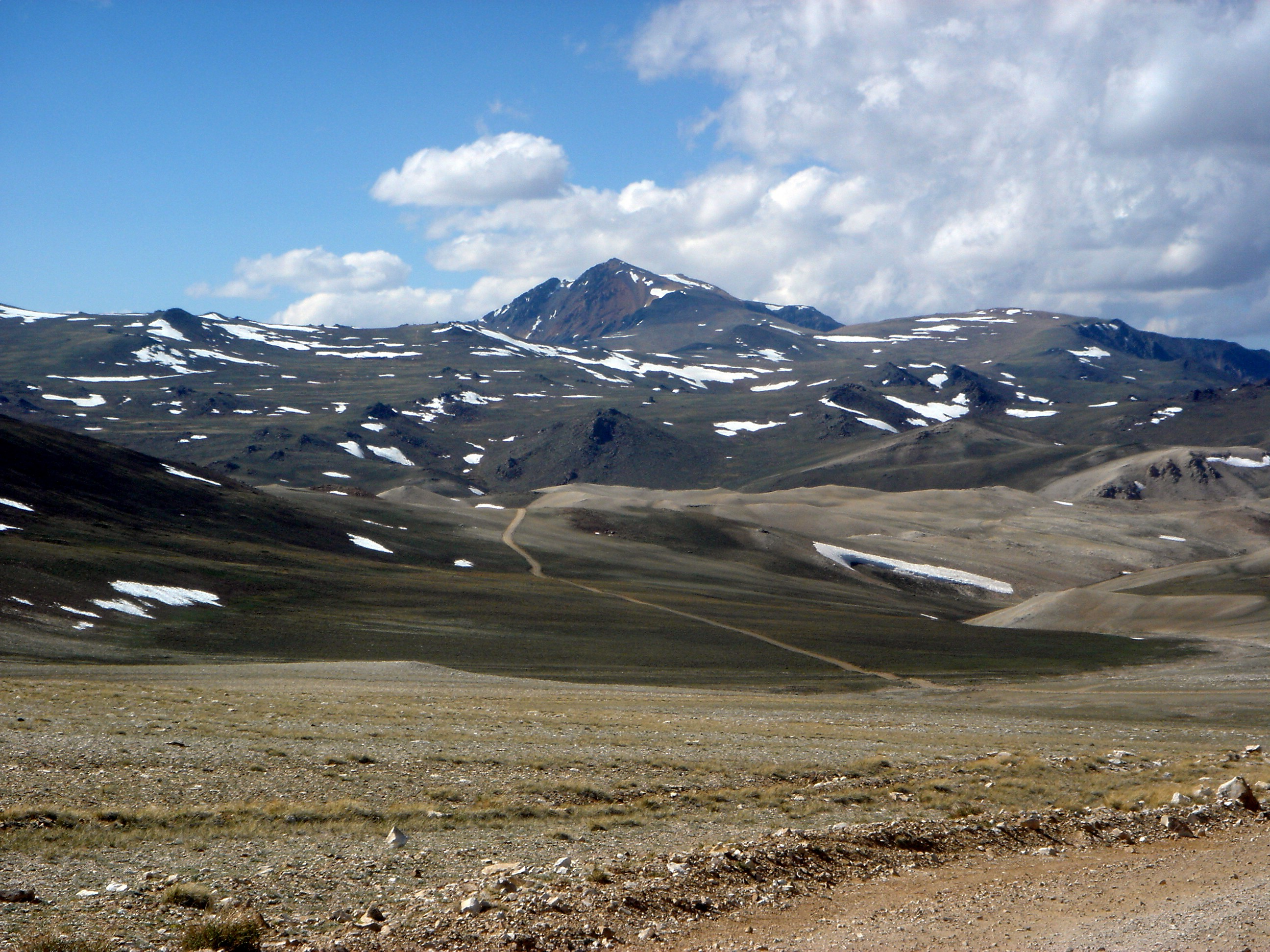
- White Mountain Peak from access road

Highest point
- Peak: White Mountain Peak
- Elevation: 14,252 ft (4,344 m)
- Coordinates: 37°38′02″N 118°15′20″W

Dimensions
- Length: 60 mi (97 km)
- Width: 10 mi (16 km)

Geography
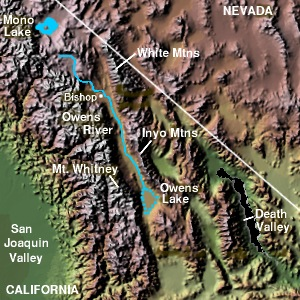
- The White Mountains along the east side of Owens Valley
- Country: United States
- States: California; Nevada
- Range coordinates: 37°35.0′N 118°16.05′W
- Parent range: Basin and Range Province
- Borders on: Inyo Mountains; Sierra Nevada

The White Mountains of California and Nevada are a triangular fault-block mountain range facing the Sierra Nevada across the upper Owens Valley. They extend for approximately 60 mi (97 km) as a greatly elevated plateau about 20 mi (32 km) wide on the south, narrowing to a point at the north, with elevations generally increasing south to north. The range's broad southern end is near the community of Big Pine, where Westgard Pass and Deep Springs Valley separate it from the Inyo Mountains. The narrow northern end is at Montgomery Pass, where U.S. Route 6 crosses. The Fish Lake Valley lies east of the range; the southeast part of the mountains are separated from the Silver Peak Range by block faulting across the Furnace Creek Fault Zone, forming a feeder valley to Fish Lake Valley. The range lies within the eastern section of the Inyo National Forest.

== Ecology ==
Ecologically, the White Mountains are like the other ranges in the Basin and Range Province; they are dry, but the upper slopes from 9,200 to 11,500 ft (2,800 to 3,500 m) hold open subalpine forests of Great Basin bristlecone pine on permeable dolomite and certain granite substrates and limber pine on less permeable rocky substrates. Middle slopes from 6,500 to 8,200 ft (2,000 to 2,500 m) have somewhat denser stands of piñon pine and Utah juniper. These upper and lower conifer zones are often separated by a zone of mountain mahogany brush. Various subspecies of sagebrush (Artemisia tridentata) extend from surrounding valleys to the lower alpine zone.

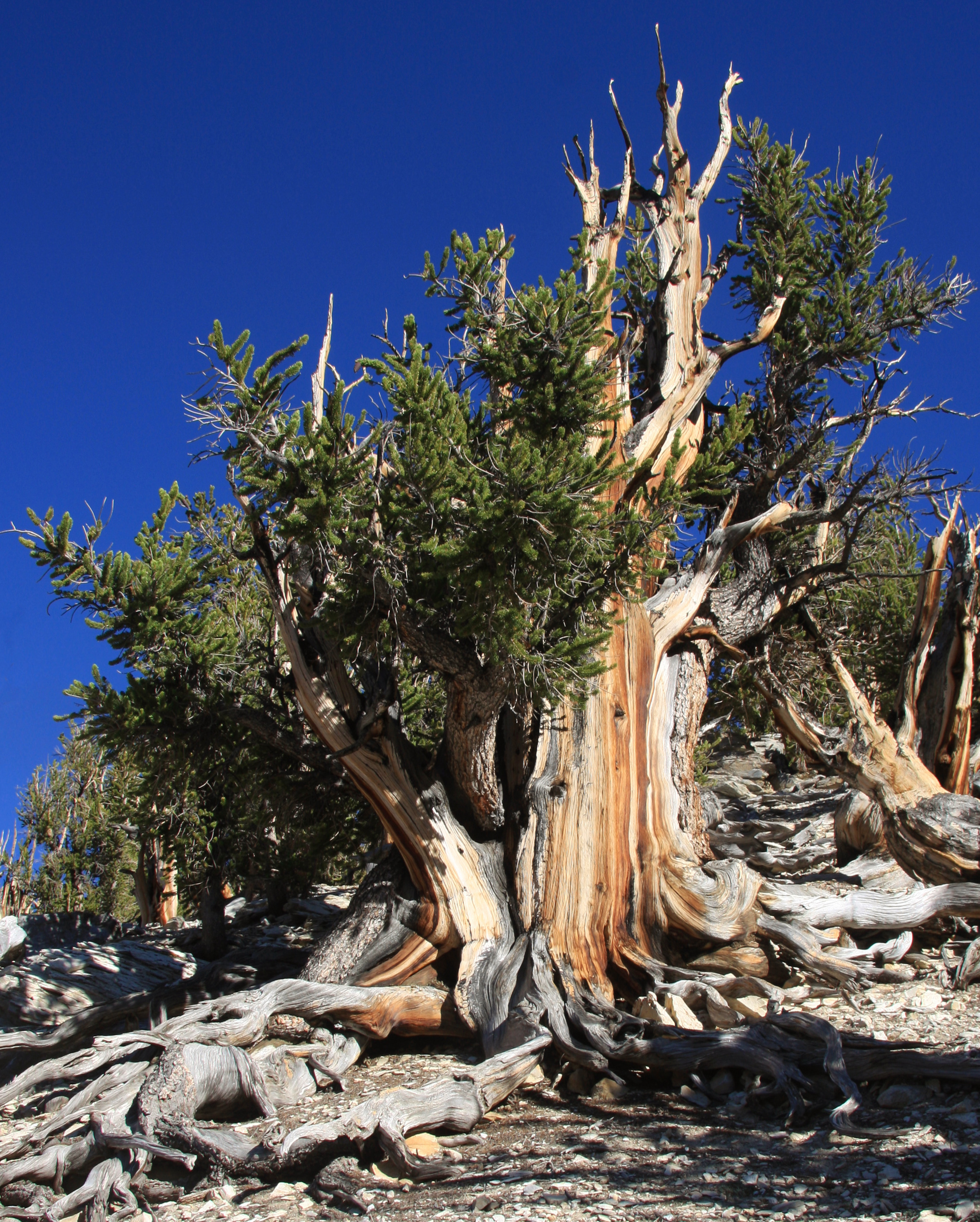
Bristlecone pine, White Mountains, California.

A bristlecone pine, named Methuselah, located within the mountain range is the oldest known, verified living tree in the world, at 4,857 years old. Pine nuts from piñon pine stands were harvested as a winter staple food by Paiute Indians whose descendants still live in adjacent valleys.

The White Mountains also have small remnant groves of lodgepole pine, Jeffrey pine, ponderosa pine, Sierra juniper and aspen including an unusual dwarf variety. These species are common in the nearby and wetter Sierra Nevada range west of the Owens Valley and must have been more widespread in the White Mountains until Holocene droughts extirpated them in most of this drier range. A number of plant species are endemic to the White Mountains, including the White Mountains horkelia, Horkelia hispidula.

Fauna include two herds of bighorn sheep, mule deer, marmots and feral horses. Permanent streams have no native fish, but there are naturalized populations of trout including rare Paiute cutthroat trout which is protected from angling. Birds include Clark's nutcracker and other Corvidae which eat and cache pine nuts.

== History ==
Cattle from ranches in surrounding valleys are still grazed under permit as high as the alpine zone. Historically sheep were also grazed in large numbers, introducing diseases from which the native Bighorn Sheep populations are still slowly recovering. Before European colonization of surrounding valleys in the mid 19th century, Paiute people occupied summer hunting camps up to about 13,100 ft (4,000 m), leaving ruins of archeological interest.

== Geography ==
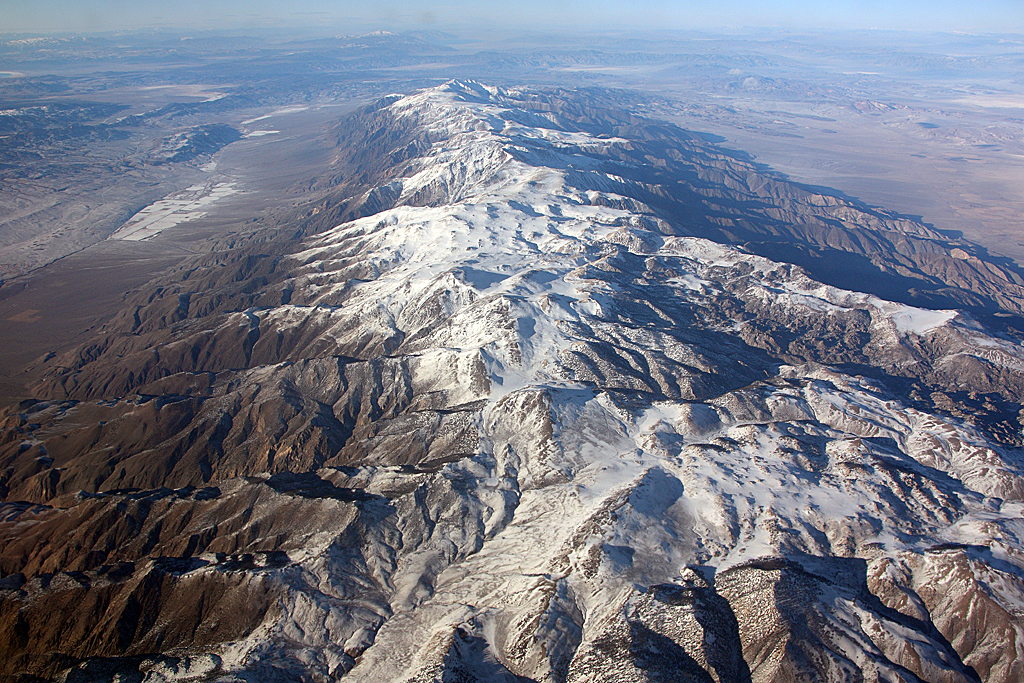
Aerial view of the White Mountains, looking north over the Pellisier Flats to Montgomery and Boundary Peaks at the end of the range.

The highest point in the range is White Mountain Peak, which at 14,252 ft (4,344 m) is the third-highest summit in California. This peak is actually an extinct volcano rising about 1,600 ft (490 m) above the plateau surface. The summit is composed of Mesozoic metavolcanic rock – lava lifted and melted by rising granite. The volcano itself is long since gone. The White Mountains are the highest range completely inside the Great Basin, although the adjacent Sierra Nevada Range along the basin's western edge has two higher summits. The entire range is within the Inyo National Forest.

Mount Barcroft is a mountain peak about 3.5 miles (5.6 km) south of White Mountain Peak.

=== Climate ===
Climate data for Mount Barcroft 37.5816 N, 118.2486 W, Elevation: 12,743 ft (3,884 m) (1991–2020 normals)
| Month | Jan | Feb | Mar | Apr | May | Jun | Jul | Aug | Sep | Oct | Nov | Dec | Year |
|---|---|---|---|---|---|---|---|---|---|---|---|---|---|
| Mean daily maximum °F (°C) | 26.1 (−3.3) | 23.4 (−4.8) | 26.9 (−2.8) | 30.2 (−1.0) | 37.7 (3.2) | 52.1 (11.2) | 59.5 (15.3) | 58.5 (14.7) | 50.0 (10.0) | 41.3 (5.2) | 32.8 (0.4) | 25.1 (−3.8) | 38.6 (3.7) |
| Daily mean °F (°C) | 17.7 (−7.9) | 15.0 (−9.4) | 17.9 (−7.8) | 20.9 (−6.2) | 27.0 (−2.8) | 38.5 (3.6) | 45.3 (7.4) | 44.3 (6.8) | 39.7 (4.3) | 32.0 (0.0) | 23.9 (−4.5) | 17.2 (−8.2) | 28.3 (−2.1) |
| Mean daily minimum °F (°C) | 9.2 (−12.7) | 6.6 (−14.1) | 9.0 (−12.8) | 11.7 (−11.3) | 16.3 (−8.7) | 24.9 (−3.9) | 31.2 (−0.4) | 30.4 (−0.9) | 29.3 (−1.5) | 22.7 (−5.2) | 15.1 (−9.4) | 9.3 (−12.6) | 18.0 (−7.8) |
| Average precipitation inches (mm) | 3.40 (86) | 3.17 (81) | 3.08 (78) | 1.70 (43) | 1.35 (34) | 0.69 (18) | 0.98 (25) | 1.00 (25) | 0.47 (12) | 1.49 (38) | 0.83 (21) | 2.88 (73) | 21.04 (534) |
Source: PRISM Climate Group

Climate data for Sheep Mountain (CA) 37.5269 N, 118.2174 W, Elevation: 12,152 ft (3,704 m) (1991–2020 normals)
| Month | Jan | Feb | Mar | Apr | May | Jun | Jul | Aug | Sep | Oct | Nov | Dec | Year |
|---|---|---|---|---|---|---|---|---|---|---|---|---|---|
| Mean daily maximum °F (°C) | 27.9 (−2.3) | 26.3 (−3.2) | 29.6 (−1.3) | 32.4 (0.2) | 40.2 (4.6) | 54.0 (12.2) | 61.3 (16.3) | 60.3 (15.7) | 51.7 (10.9) | 42.4 (5.8) | 34.7 (1.5) | 27.3 (−2.6) | 40.7 (4.8) |
| Daily mean °F (°C) | 19.5 (−6.9) | 17.6 (−8.0) | 20.4 (−6.4) | 23.4 (−4.8) | 29.4 (−1.4) | 40.6 (4.8) | 47.5 (8.6) | 46.6 (8.1) | 41.0 (5.0) | 33.0 (0.6) | 25.9 (−3.4) | 19.4 (−7.0) | 30.4 (−0.9) |
| Mean daily minimum °F (°C) | 11.2 (−11.6) | 8.9 (−12.8) | 11.1 (−11.6) | 14.3 (−9.8) | 18.7 (−7.4) | 27.3 (−2.6) | 33.8 (1.0) | 32.9 (0.5) | 30.4 (−0.9) | 23.7 (−4.6) | 17.1 (−8.3) | 11.5 (−11.4) | 20.1 (−6.6) |
| Average precipitation inches (mm) | 3.18 (81) | 3.25 (83) | 2.81 (71) | 1.60 (41) | 1.30 (33) | 0.60 (15) | 0.91 (23) | 0.87 (22) | 0.50 (13) | 1.32 (34) | 0.89 (23) | 2.73 (69) | 19.96 (508) |
Source: PRISM Climate Group

== Hiking ==
A four-wheel drive road reaches the summit of White Mountain Peak from the south to service the summit laboratory of the White Mountain Research Center. The road is normally gated seven miles from the summit at an elevation of 11,680 ft (3,560 m), making this California's easiest 14,000 ft (4,300 m) summit.

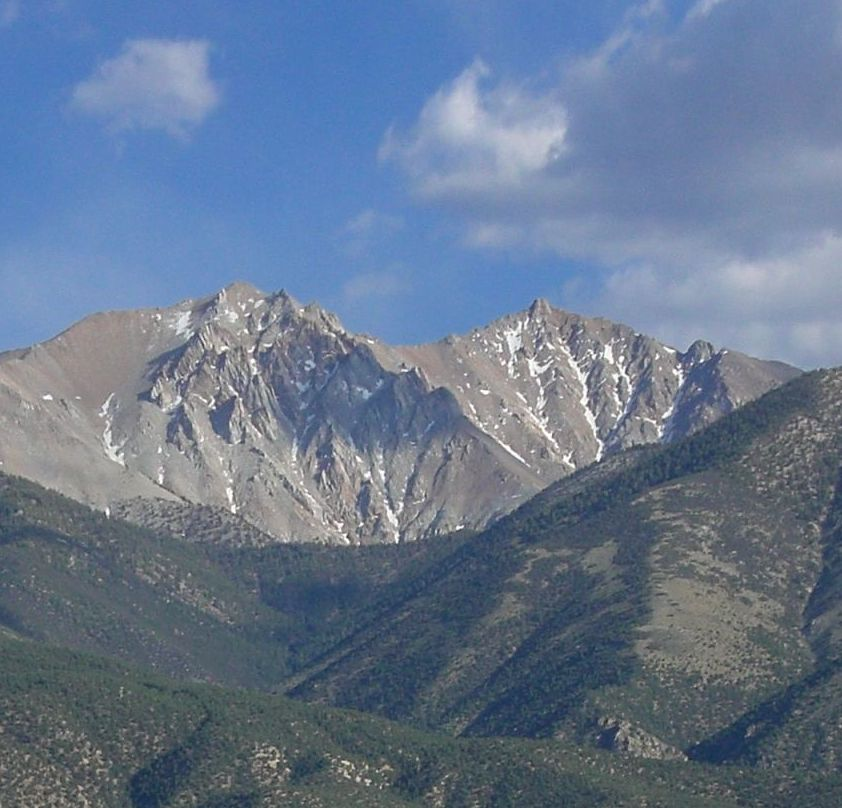
Boundary and Montgomery Peaks at the north end of the range

North of White Mountain Peak, two sharp arêtes alternate along the crest with the broad "whalebacks" plateau of Pellisier Flats with about six more summits over 13,000 ft (4,000 m). Pellisier Flats is a wide sloping bench at the 13000 foot level with rocky fields and short alpine vegetation. The bench includes Mt. Hogue at 12,743 ft. and further north Mt. Dubois at 13,559 ft., the high point on the plateau. Pellisier Flats is the broad spine of the White Mountains.

The crest crosses the California–Nevada state line just south of a final high summit at Boundary Peak 13,147 ft (4,007 m), Nevada's high point. Boundary Peak is the "prow" of the triangular fault block. It has views directly down into valleys to the west, north and east that are hidden by the increasing width of the high plateau to the south. North of Boundary Peak the range rapidly loses altitude and ends at Montgomery Pass.

The west face of the White Mountains rises steeply out of Owens Valley. Climbing to any summit from this direction is a scramble with about 8,000 ft (2,400 m) elevation gain. Eastern slopes are somewhat gentler and have numerous cirques left by Pleistocene glaciers and even a few snowfields persisting through most summers. Most of these cirques are entered or approached by jeep roads and offer scenic yet non-technical routes to the crest.
