= Painted Lady (mountain) =

Mountain in the American state of California

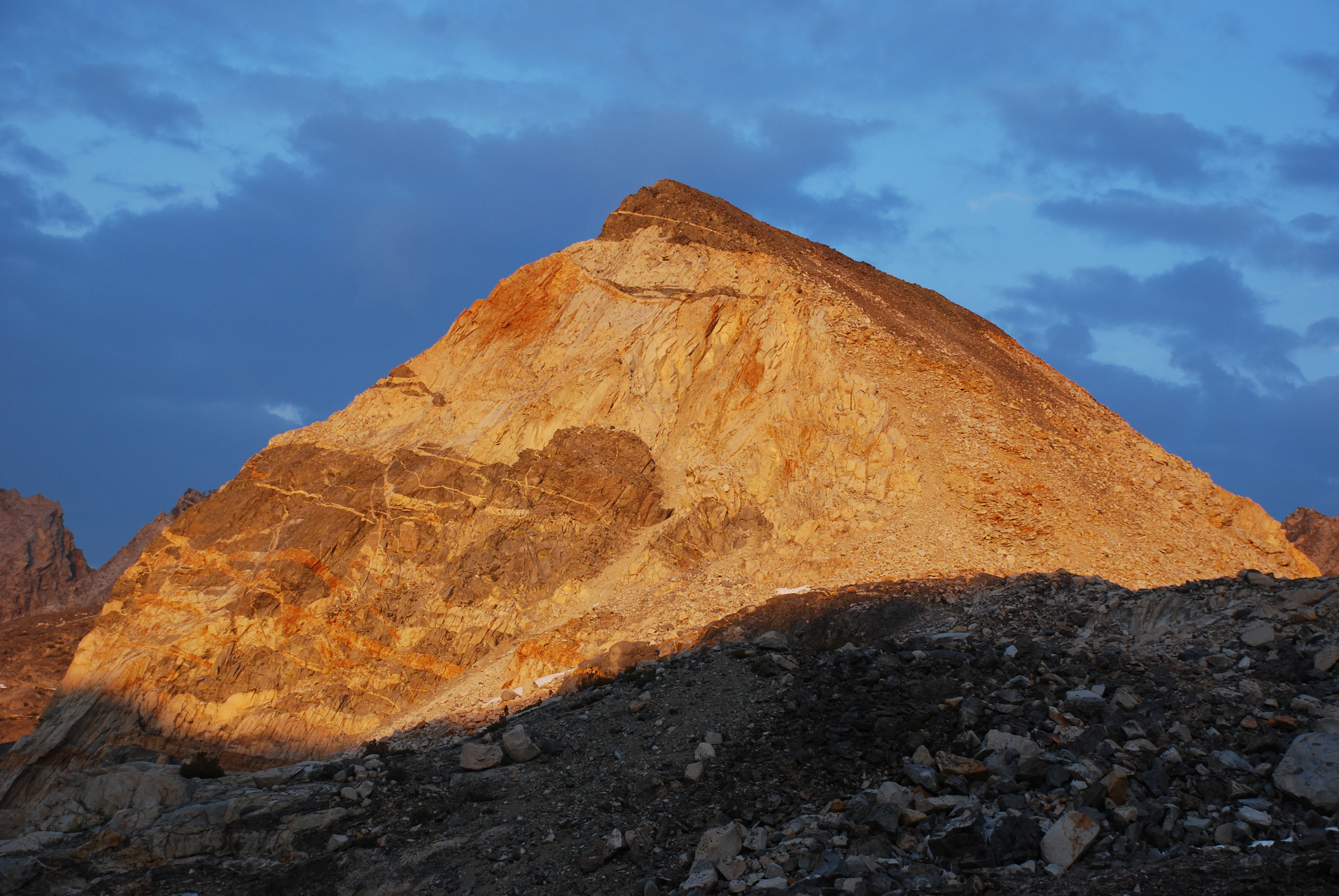
- West aspect

Highest point
- Elevation: 12,126 ft (3,696 m)
- Prominence: 242 ft (74 m)
- Parent peak: Mount Rixford (12,887 ft)
- Isolation: 0.56 mi (0.90 km),
- Coordinates: 36°47′34″N 118°23′58″W

Geography
- Location within California Location within the United States
- Location: Kings Canyon National Park
- Country: United States of America
- State: California
- County: Fresno
- Parent range: Sierra Nevada
- Topo map: USGS Mount Clarence King

Geology
- Rock age: Cretaceous
- Mountain type: Fault block
- Rock type: Metamorphic rock

Climbing
- First ascent: July 1931
- Easiest route: class 2

Painted Lady is a 12,126-foot-elevation (3,696-meter) mountain summit located in Fresno County, California.

== Description ==
Painted Lady is situated in Kings Canyon National Park, approximately one mile west of the crest of the Sierra Nevada mountain range, 11.5 miles (18.5 km) west of the community of Independence, and one-half mile north of line parent Mount Rixford. Topographic relief is significant as the north aspect rises 1,580 feet (480 meters) above Rae Lakes in 0.38 miles (0.61 km). Access to the peak is possible via the John Muir Trail which crosses Glen Pass one mile to the southwest of the peak. The first ascent of the summit was made in 1931 by Robert Owen.

== Climate ==
According to the Köppen climate classification system, Painted Lady is located in an alpine climate zone. Most weather fronts originate in the Pacific Ocean, and travel east toward the Sierra Nevada mountains. As fronts approach, they are forced upward by the peaks (orographic lift), causing them to drop their moisture in the form of rain or snowfall onto the range. Precipitation runoff from the peak drains into Rae Lakes.

== See also ==
- Painted Lady (disambiguation)

== Gallery ==
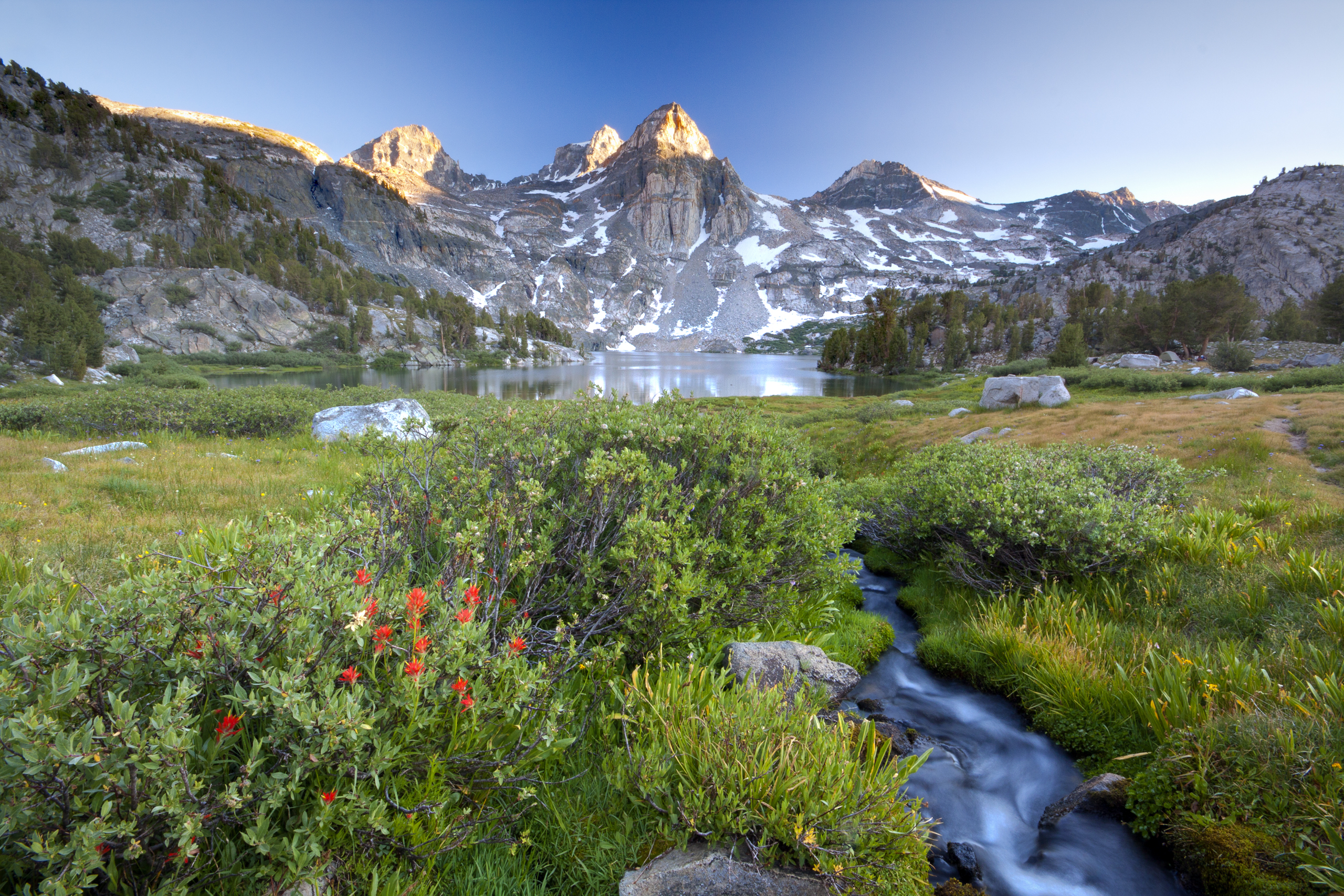
Painted Lady centered with Mt. Rixford behind left

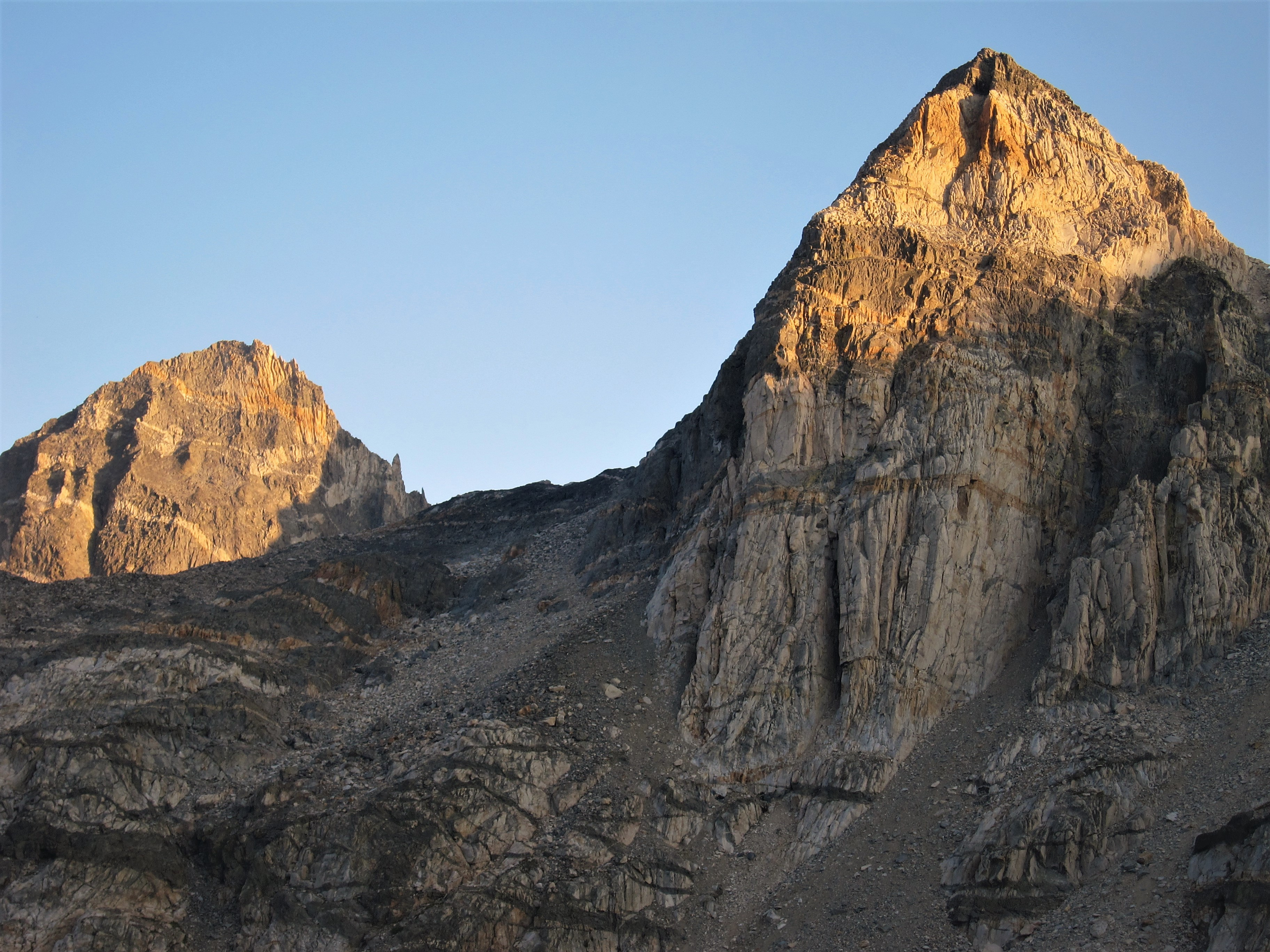
Painted Lady (right) and Falcor Peak (left)

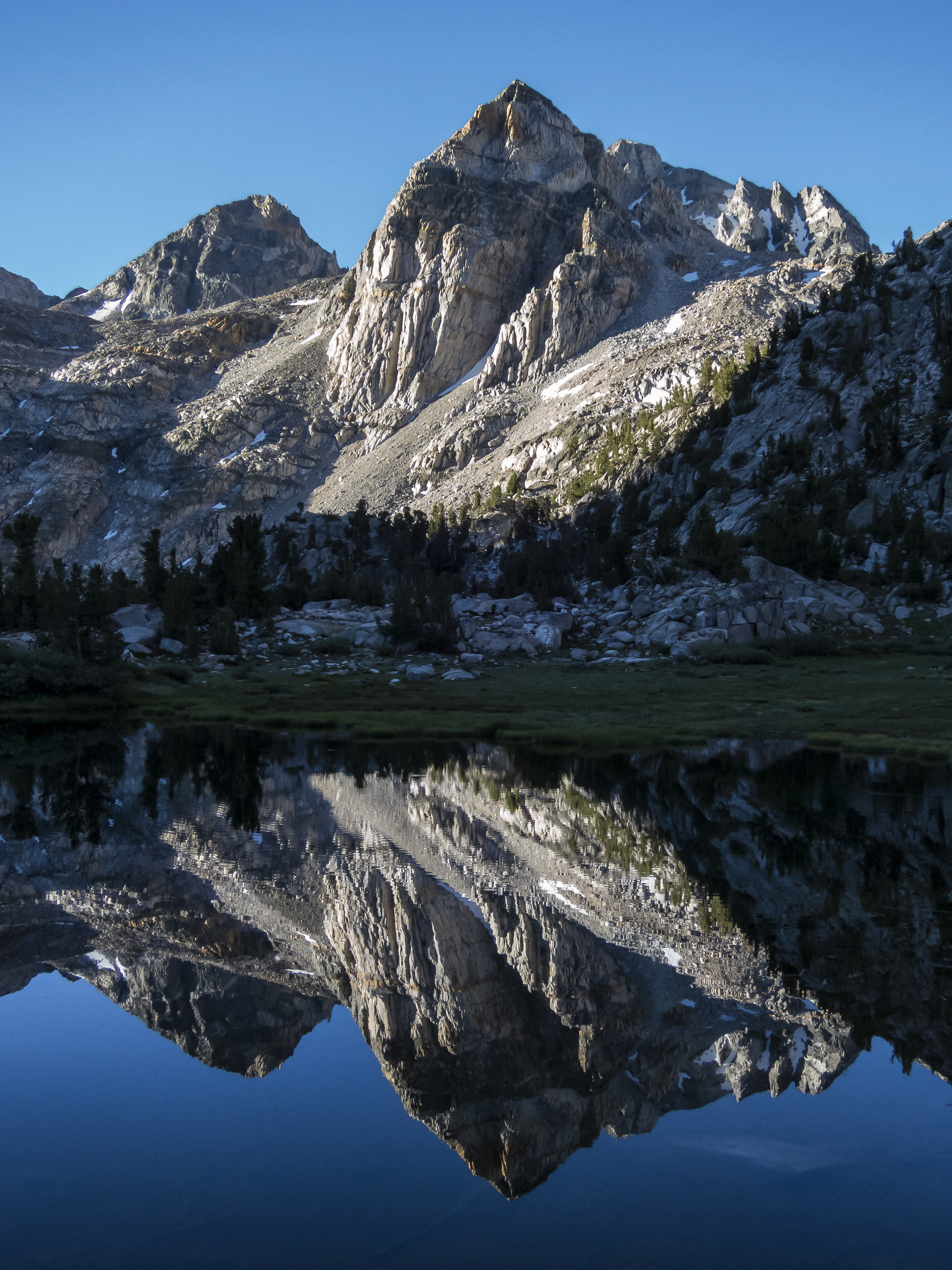
North aspect of Painted Lady

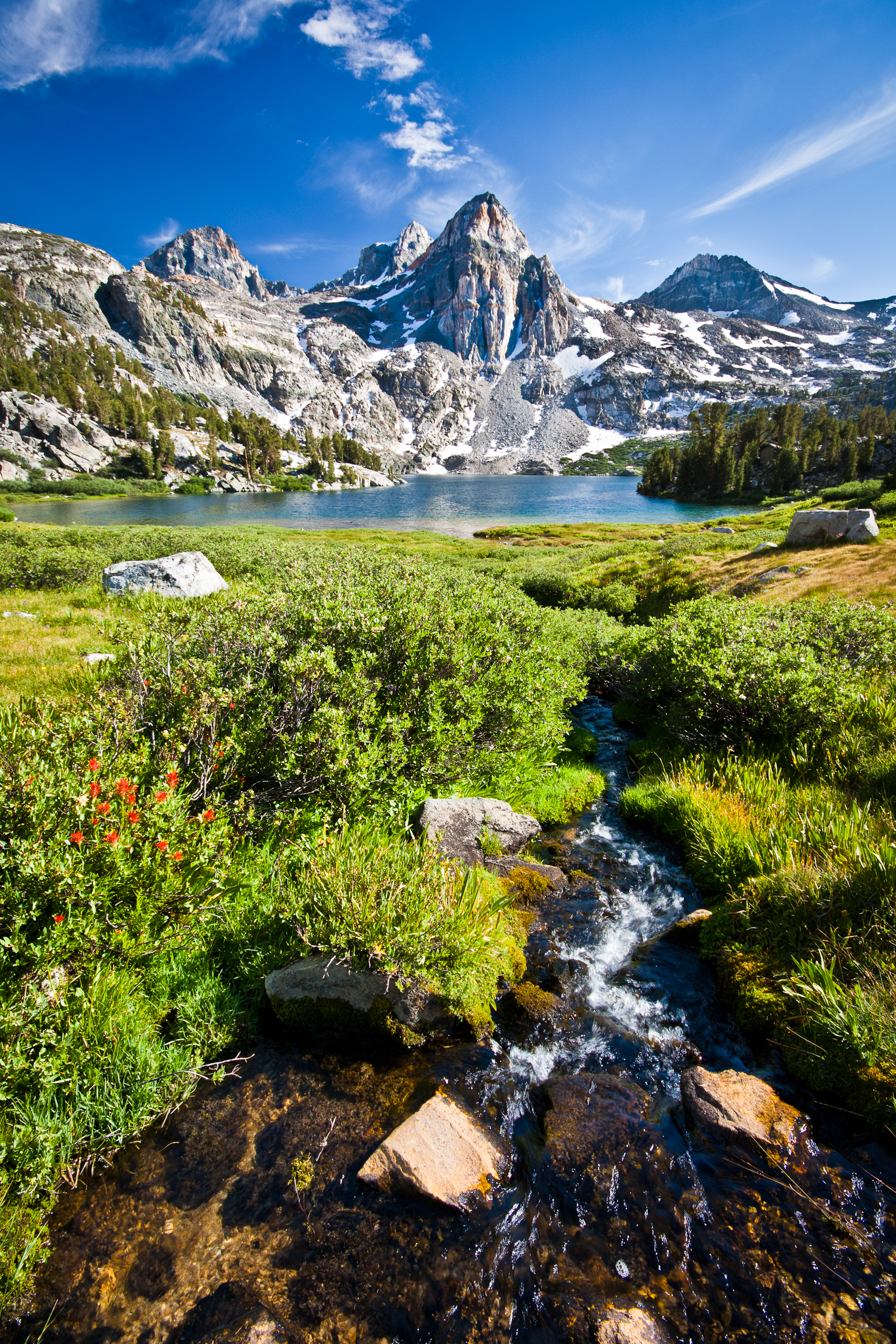
Painted Lady centered, from Rae Lakes area

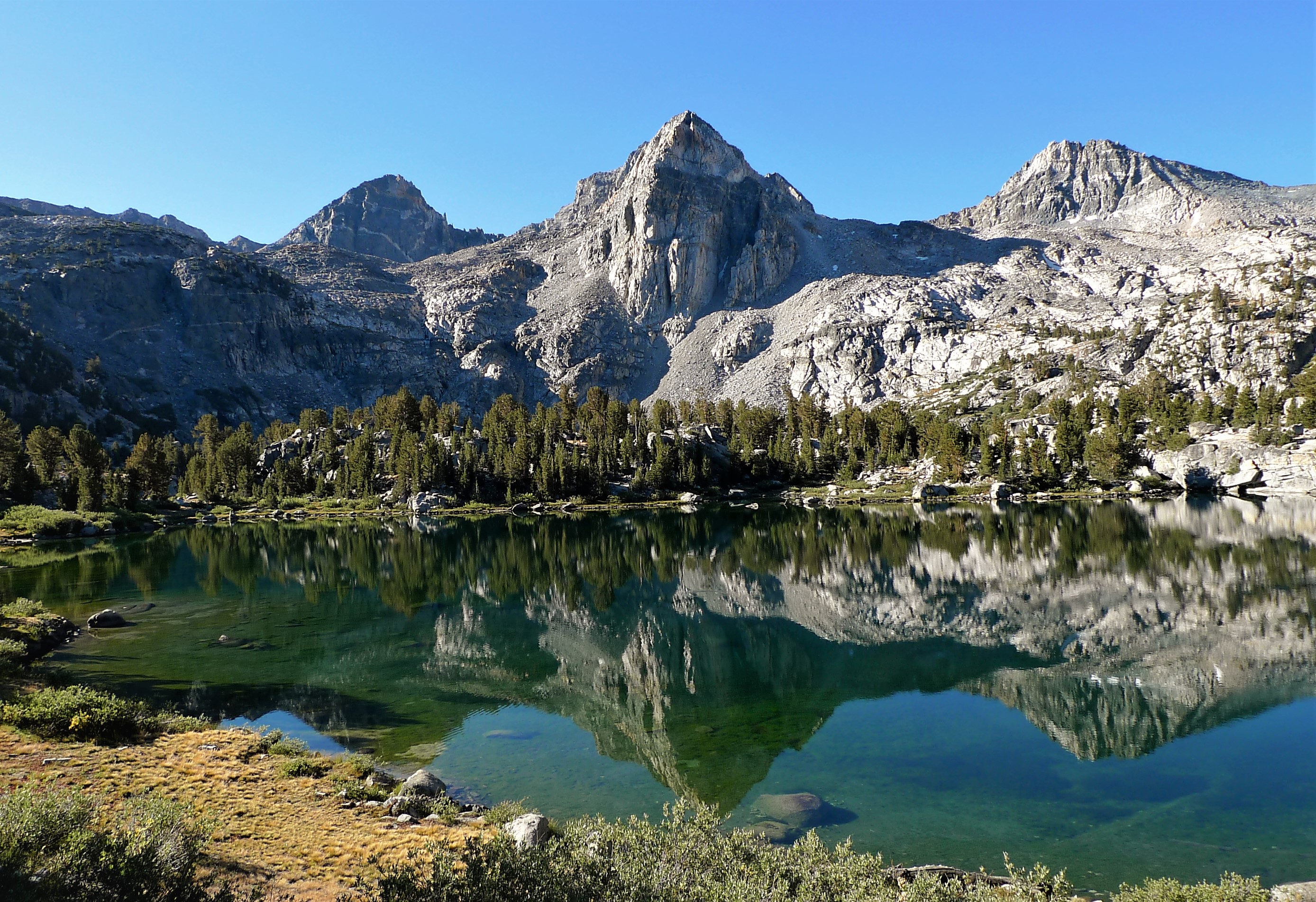
Painted Lady centered, from Rae Lakes

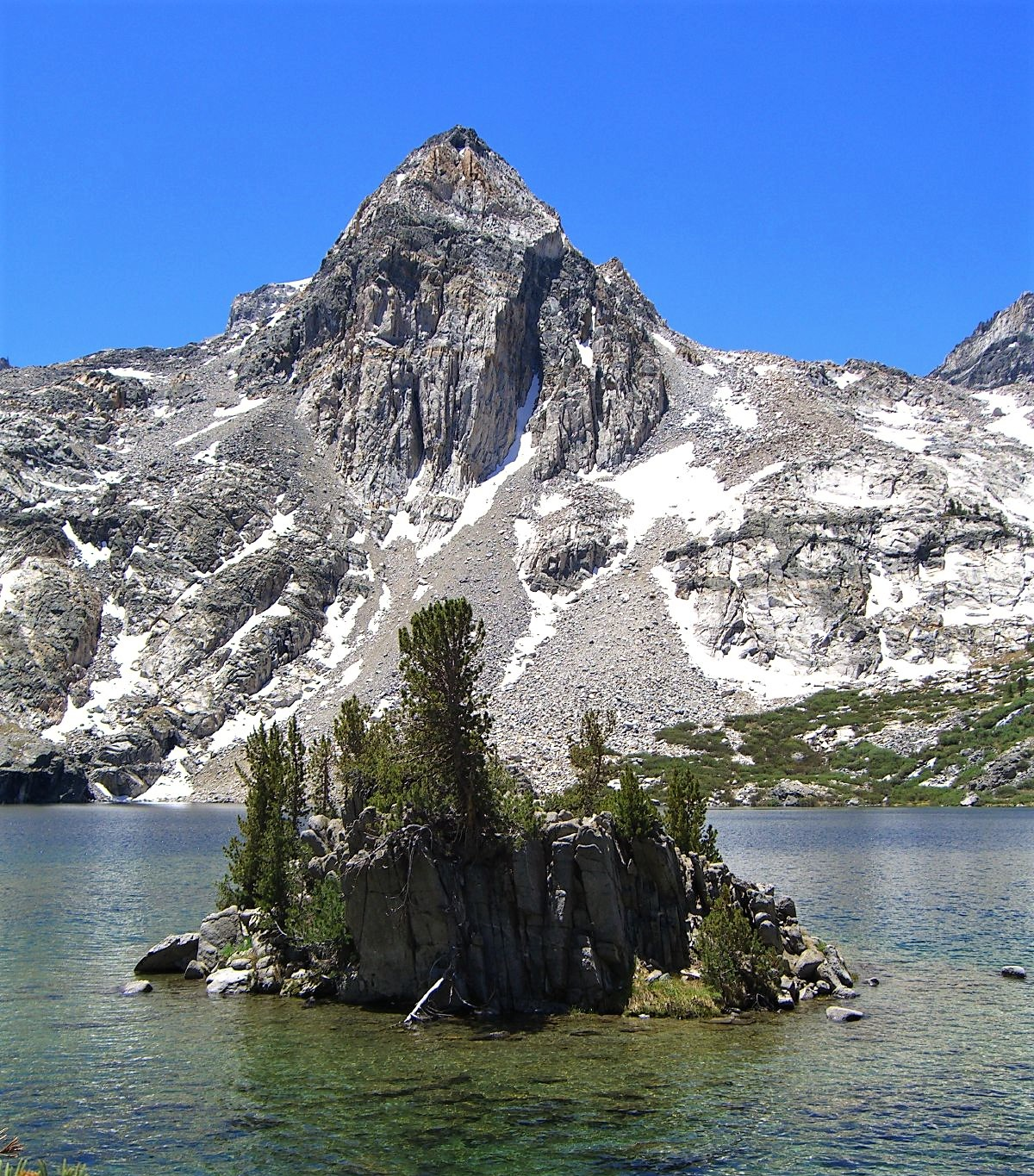
Painted Lady rises above Rae Lakes

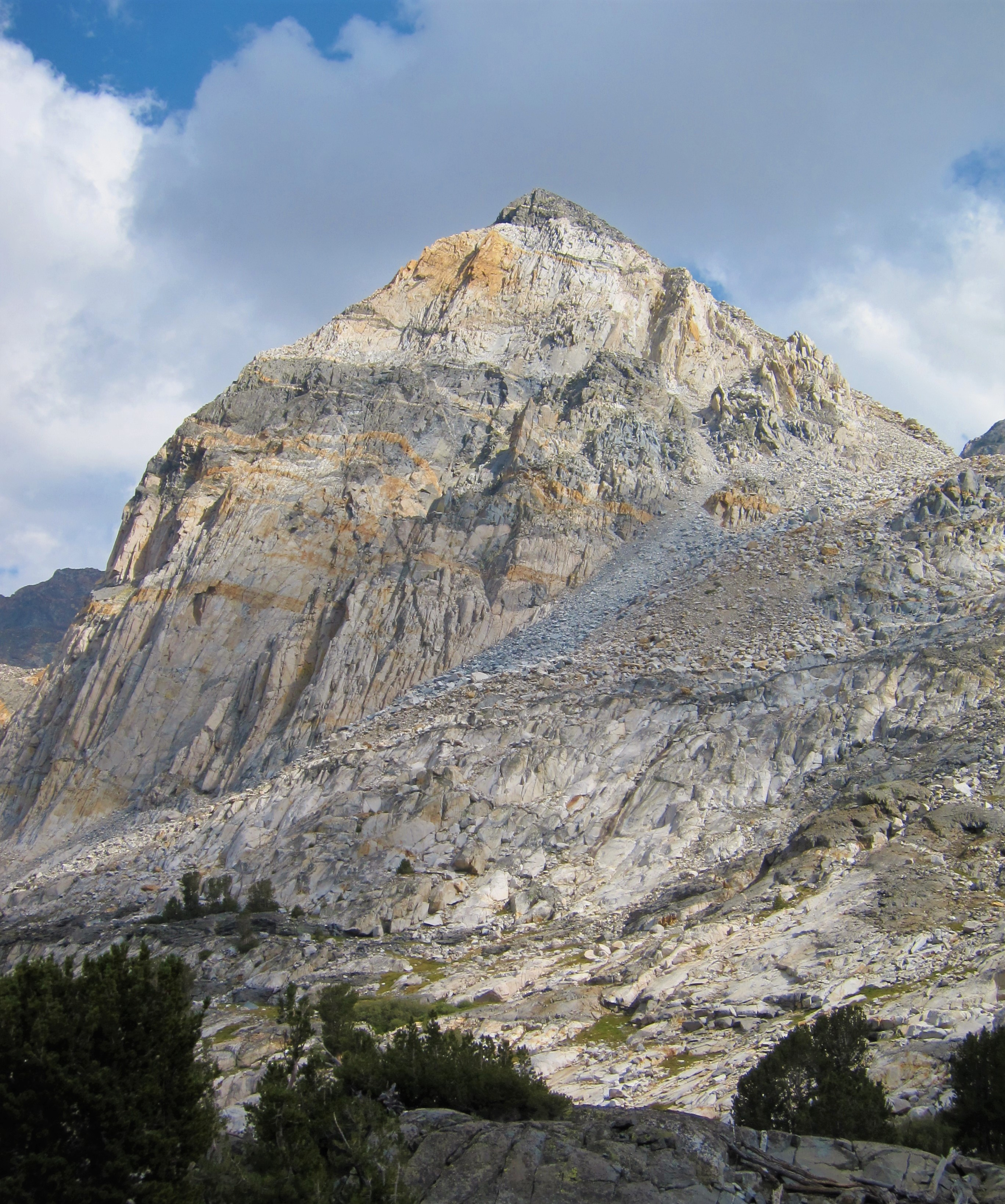
