= Falcor Peak =

Mountain in the state of California

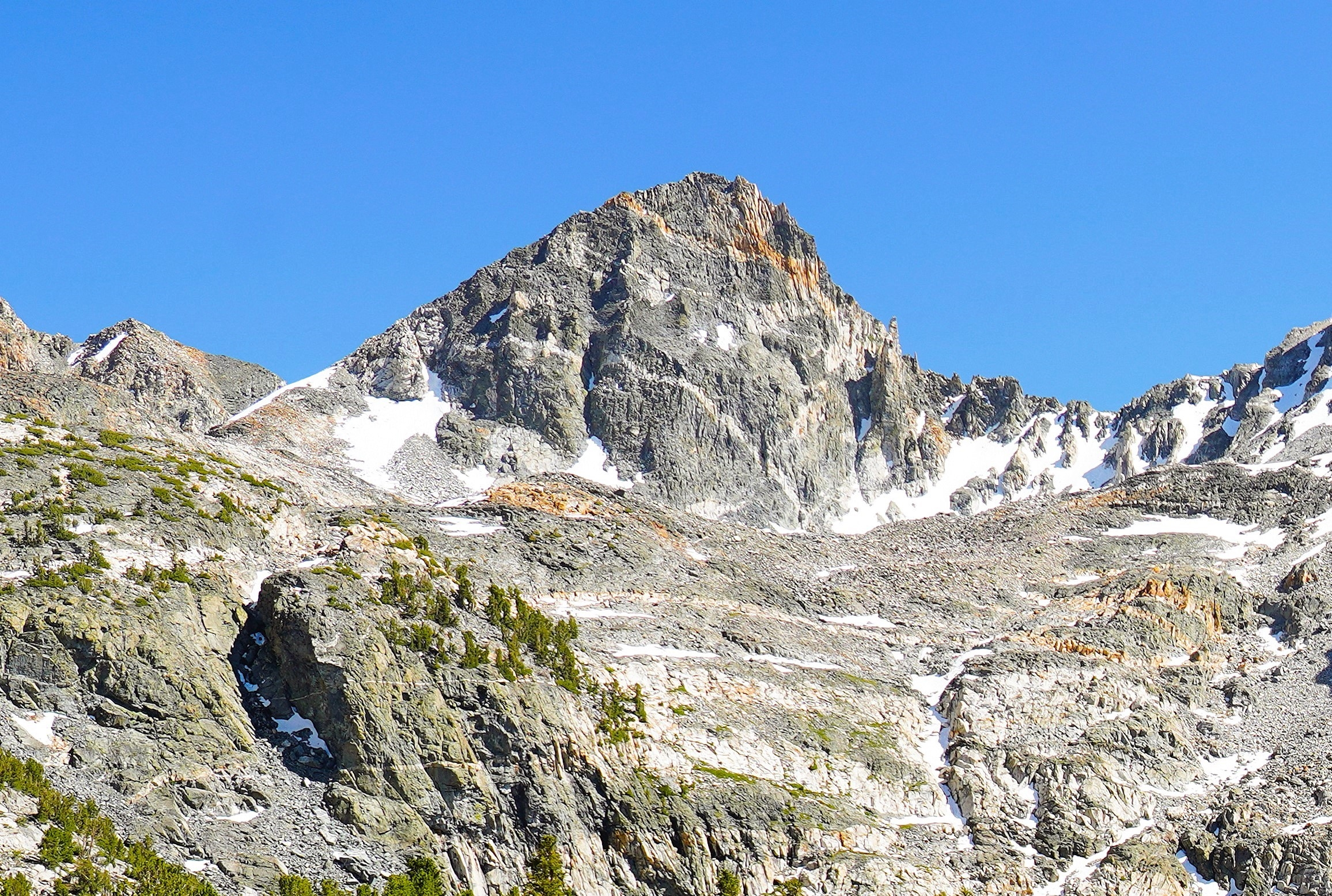
- North aspect

Highest point
- Elevation: 12,830 ft (3,911 m)
- Prominence: 427 ft (130 m)
- Parent peak: Mount Gould (13,011 ft)
- Isolation: 0.4 mi (0.64 km)
- Coordinates: 36°47′05″N 118°23′31″W

Geography
- Location within California Location within the United States
- Country: United States of America
- State: California
- County: Fresno
- Protected area: Kings Canyon National Park
- Parent range: Sierra Nevada
- Topo map: USGS Mount Clarence King

Geology
- Rock age: Cretaceous
- Mountain type: Fault block
- Rock type: Metamorphic rock

Climbing
- First ascent: 1900
- Easiest route: class 3

Falcor Peak is a 12,830-foot-elevation (3,911-meter) mountain summit in Fresno County, California, United States.

== Description ==
Falcor Peak is located in Kings Canyon National Park and approximately one mile west of the crest of the Sierra Nevada mountain range. It is situated 11 miles (18 km) west of the community of Independence and 0.4 miles (0.64 km) east of Mount Rixford, which is the nearest higher peak. Access to the peak is possible via the John Muir Trail which crosses Glen Pass one mile to the west of the peak. Precipitation runoff from the peak drains north into Rae Lakes and south to Bullfrog Lake. Topographic relief is significant as the summit rises 2,220 feet (677 meters) above Bullfrog Lake in one mile (1.6 km). The peak ranks as the 204th-highest peak in California. The first ascent of the summit was made on August 19, 1900, by John Fox along with nine others. This landform's toponym has not been officially adopted by the U.S. Board on Geographic Names.

== Climate ==
According to the Köppen climate classification system, Falcor Peak is located in an alpine climate zone. Weather fronts originating in the Pacific Ocean travel east toward the Sierra Nevada mountains. As fronts approach, they are forced upward by the peaks (orographic lift), causing them to drop their moisture in the form of rain or snowfall onto the range.

== Gallery ==
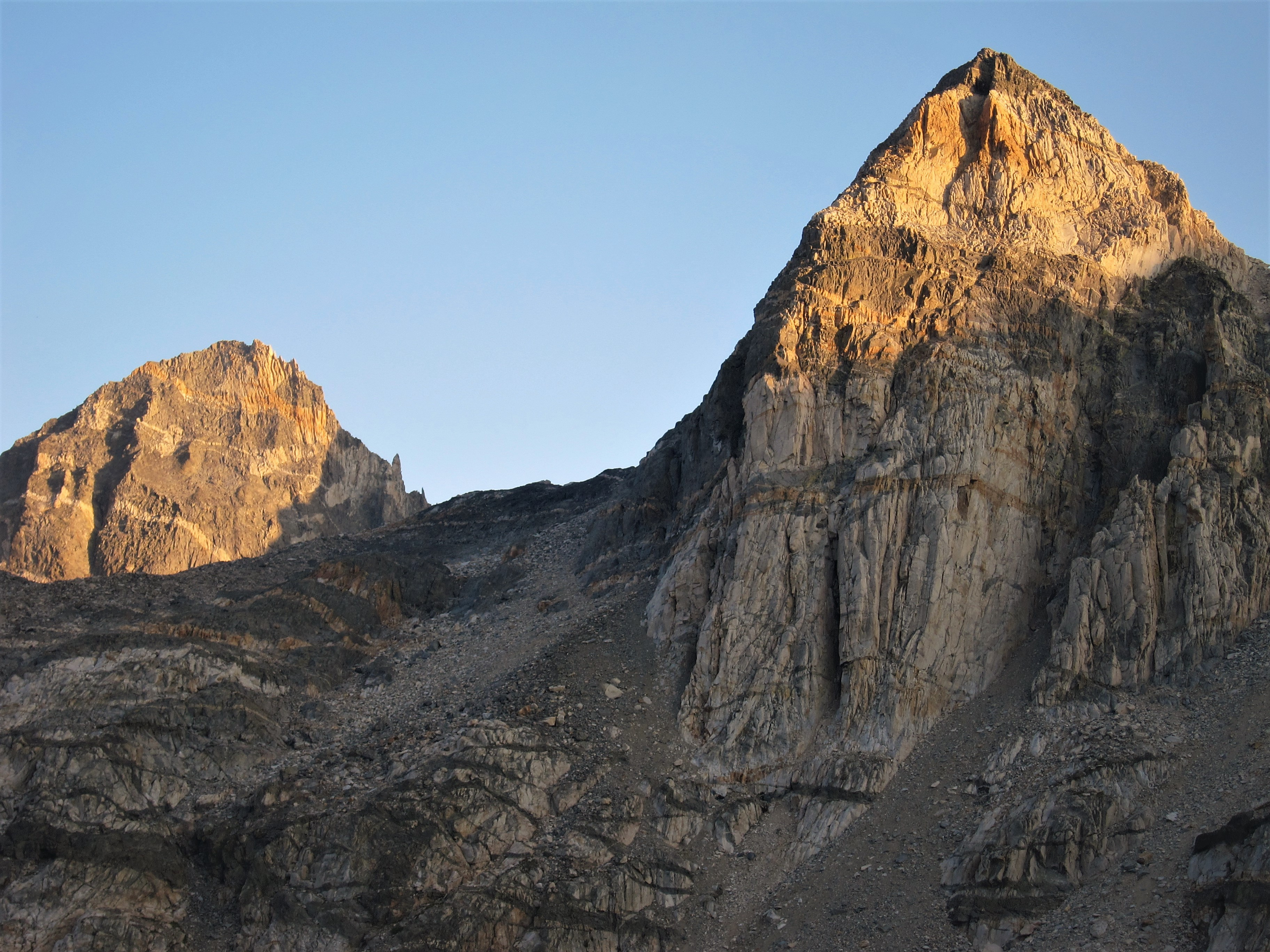
Falcor Peak (left) and Painted Lady (right)

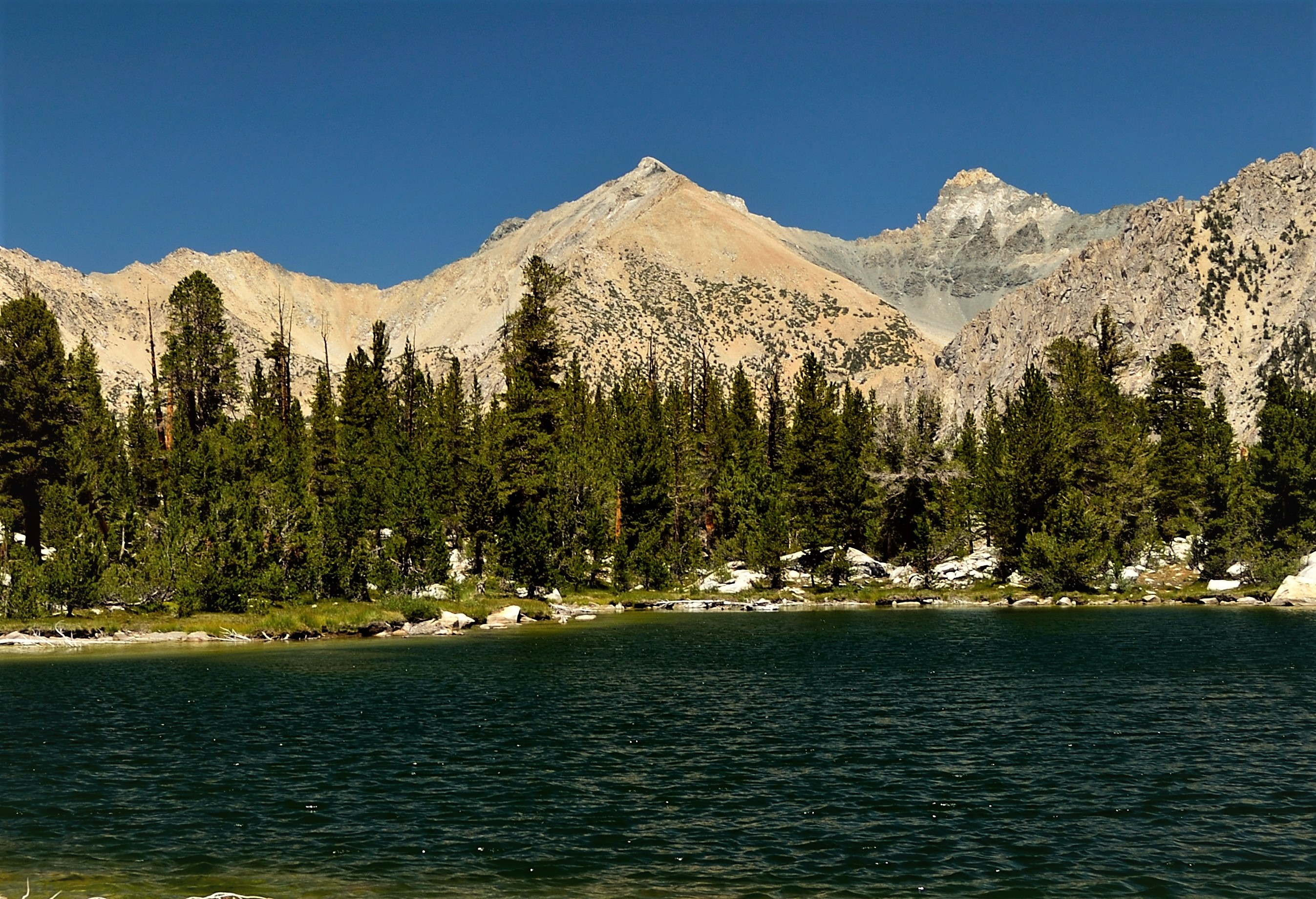
South aspect of Mount Rixford (centered) with Falcor Peak to right, from Vidette Lakes

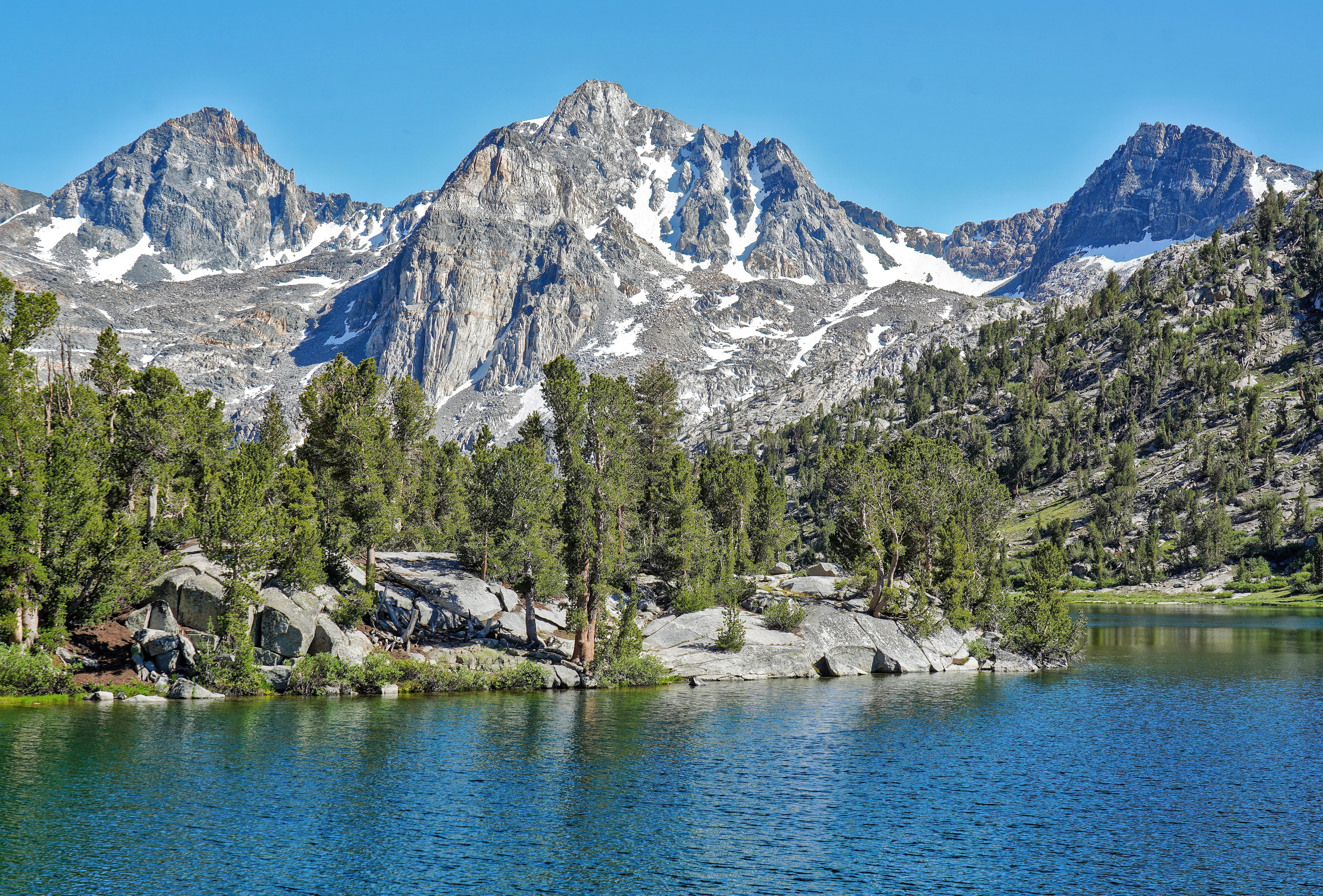
Falcor Peak, Mount Rixford, Painted Lady, Glacier Spike from Rae Lakes

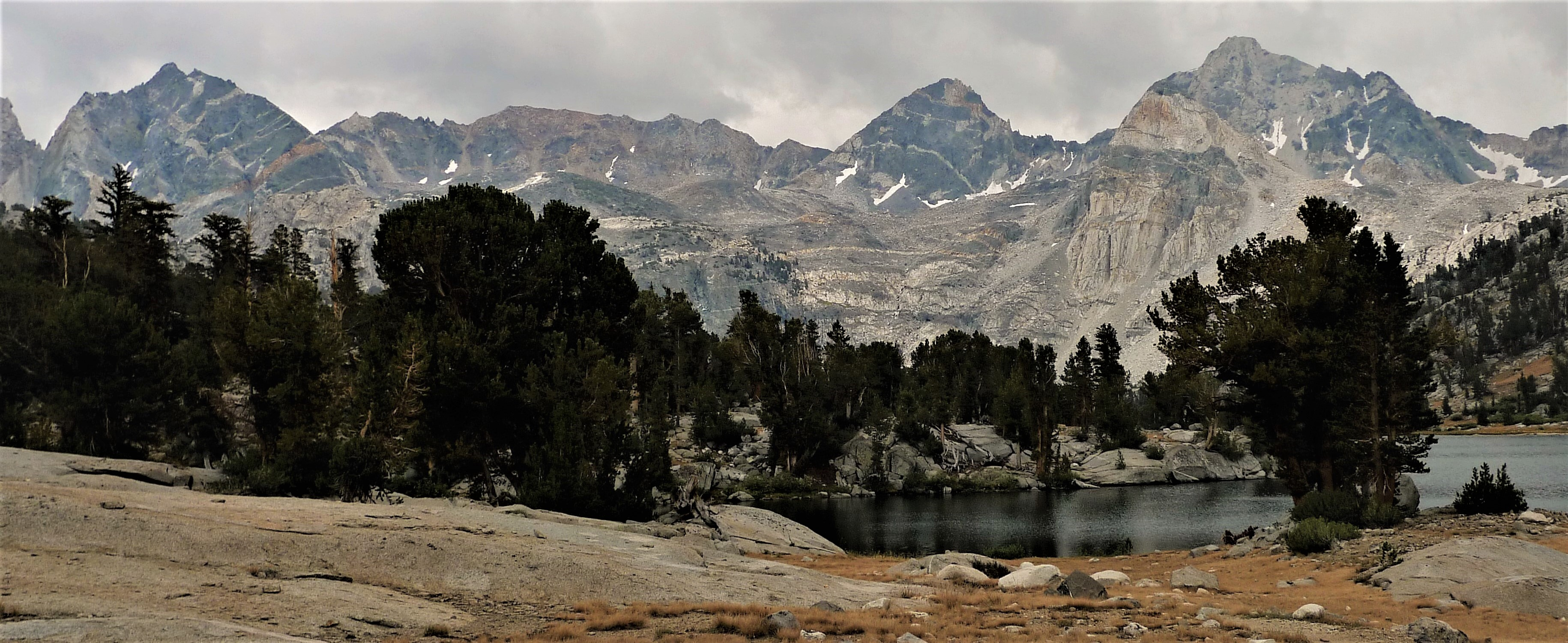
Dragon Peak (left), Falcor Peak, and Mount Rixford (right) from north at Rae Lakes

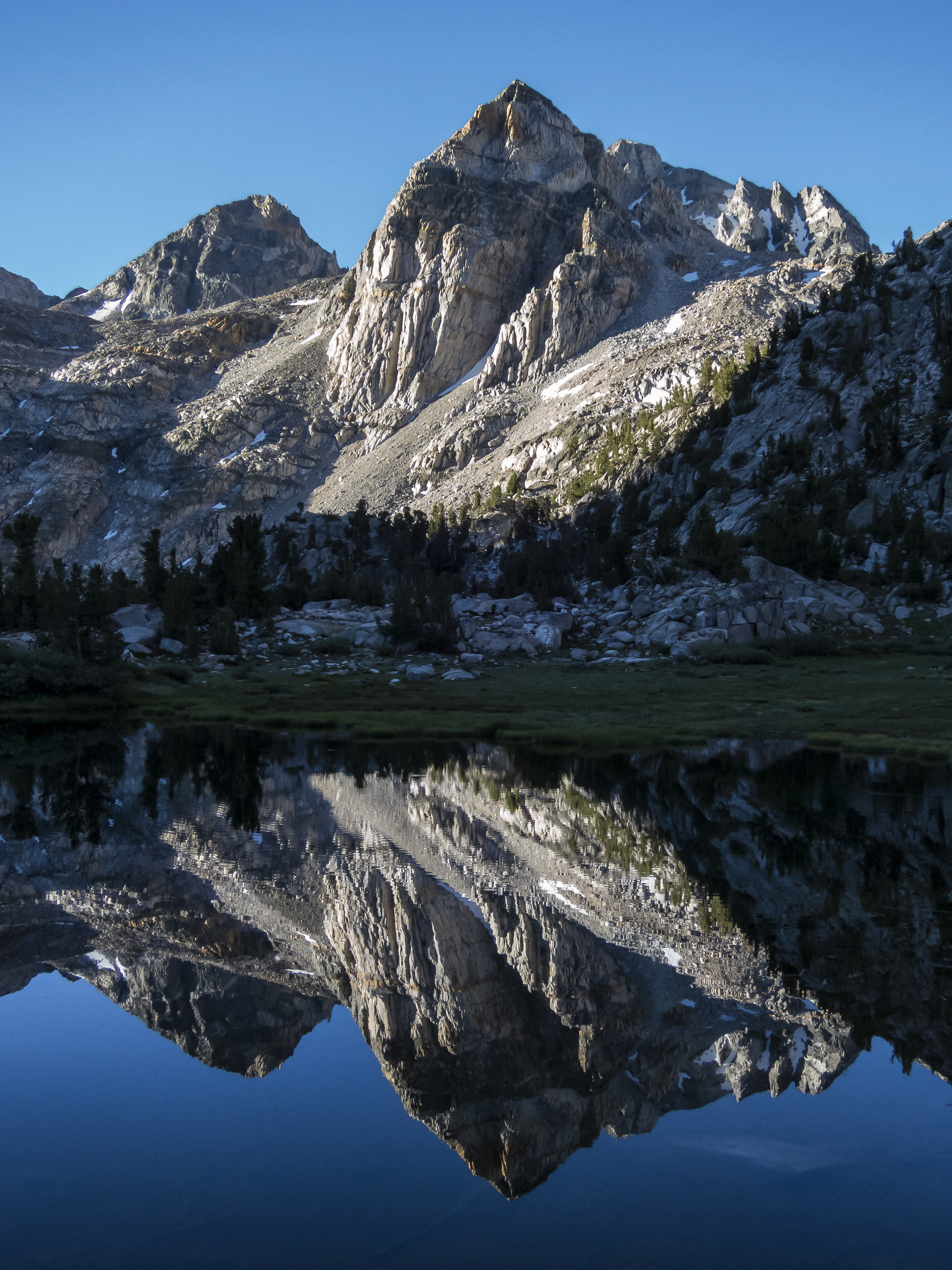
Falcor Peak (left) and Painted Lady (centered)

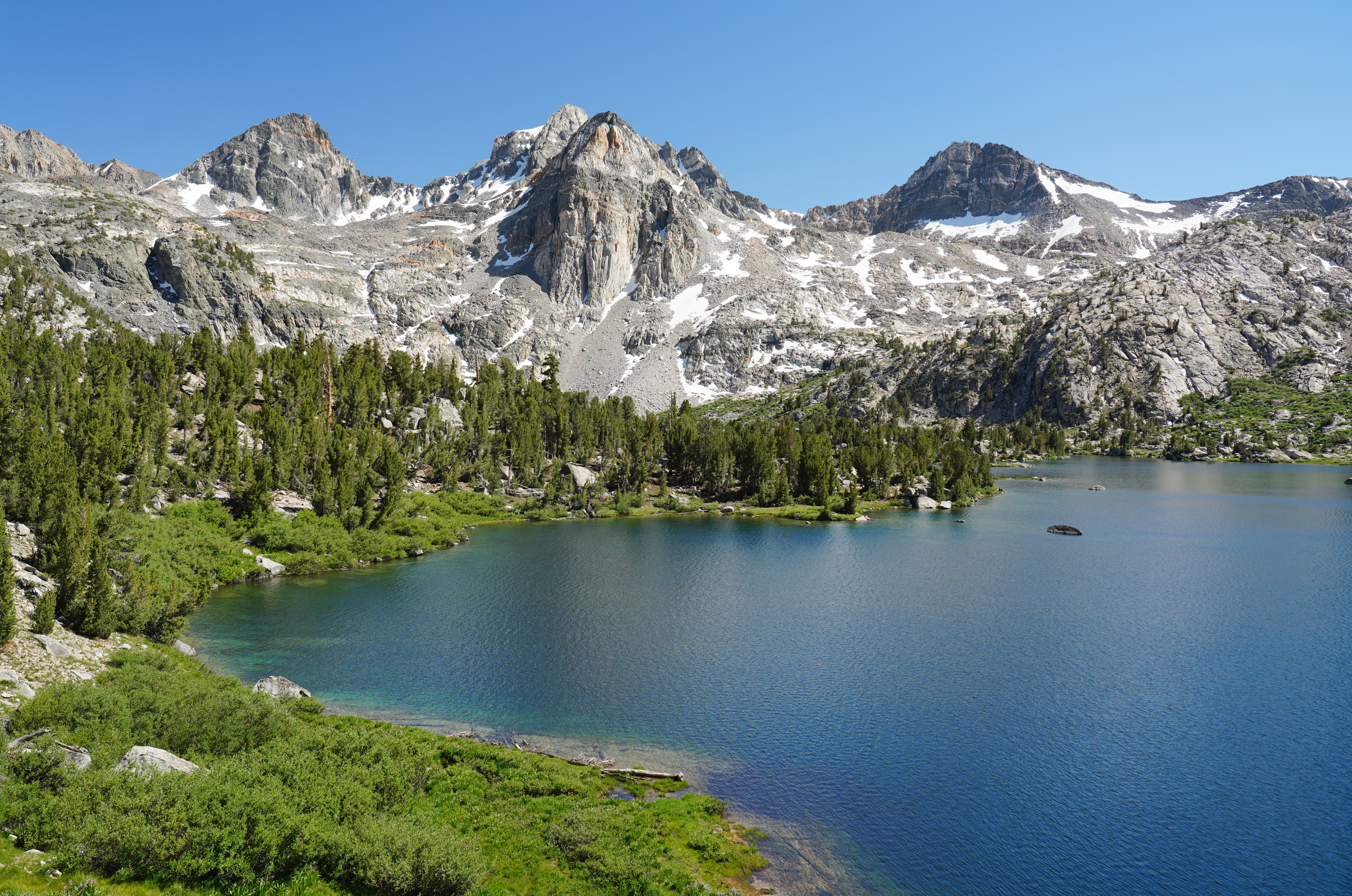
Falcor Peak in upper left

== See also ==
- List of mountain peaks of California
