= Fin Dome =

Mountain in California

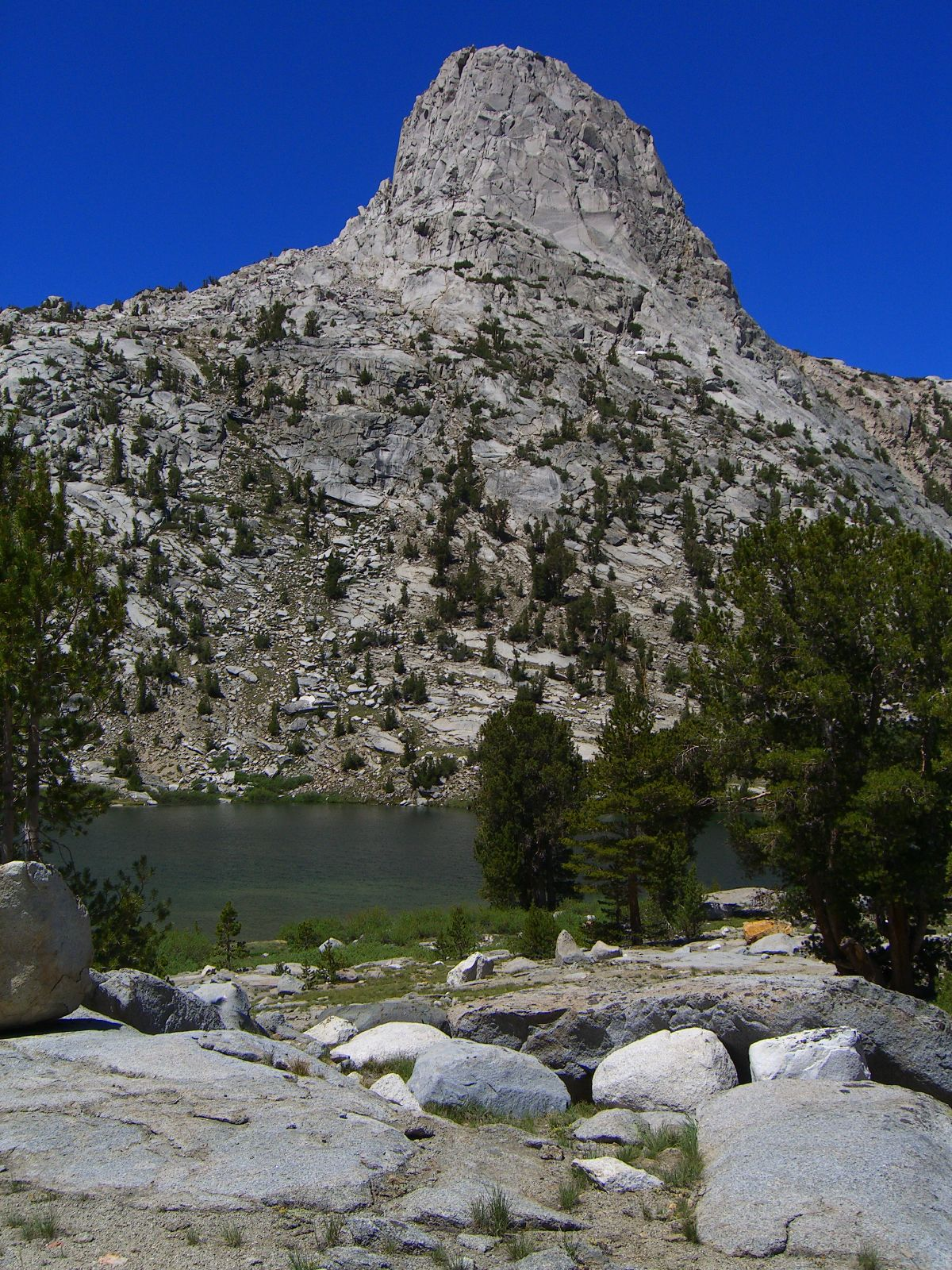
- East aspect

Highest point
- Elevation: 11,673 ft (3,558 m)
- Prominence: 387 ft (118 m)
- Isolation: 1.33 mi (2.14 km),
- Coordinates: 36°48′49″N 118°24′44″W

Geography
- Location within California Location within the United States
- Country: United States
- State: California
- County: Fresno
- Protected area: Kings Canyon National Park
- Parent range: Sierra Nevada
- Topo map: USGS Mount Clarence King

Geology
- Rock type: granite

Climbing
- First ascent: 1910
- Easiest route: class 4

Fin Dome is an 11,673-foot-elevation (3,558-meter) granite summit located 1.5 mile west of the crest of the Sierra Nevada mountain range, in the southeast corner of Fresno County, in northern California. It is situated in the Rae Lakes area of Kings Canyon National Park, approximately 15.5 miles (24.9 km) west of the community of Independence. Nearby peaks include Black Mountain 1.9 miles (3.1 km) to the east, and Mount Rixford 2.1 miles (3.4 km) to the south-southeast. Topographic relief is significant as the east aspect rises 1,135 feet (346 meters) above Rae Lakes in one-quarter mile. The John Muir Trail passes to the east of this landmark, providing an approach. This geographical feature was named by Bolton Brown in 1899 when he explored the lake basin in its vicinity, because it resembled the fin of a sea serpent. The first ascent of the summit was made in 1910 by James Rennie, one of the foremost mountaineers of the Sierra Club.

== Climate ==
According to the Köppen climate classification system, Fin Dome is located in an alpine climate zone. Most weather fronts originate in the Pacific Ocean, and travel east toward the Sierra Nevada mountains. As fronts approach, they are forced upward by the peaks, causing them to drop their moisture in the form of rain or snowfall onto the range (orographic lift). Precipitation runoff from this peak drains into tributaries of the South Fork Kings River.

== Gallery ==
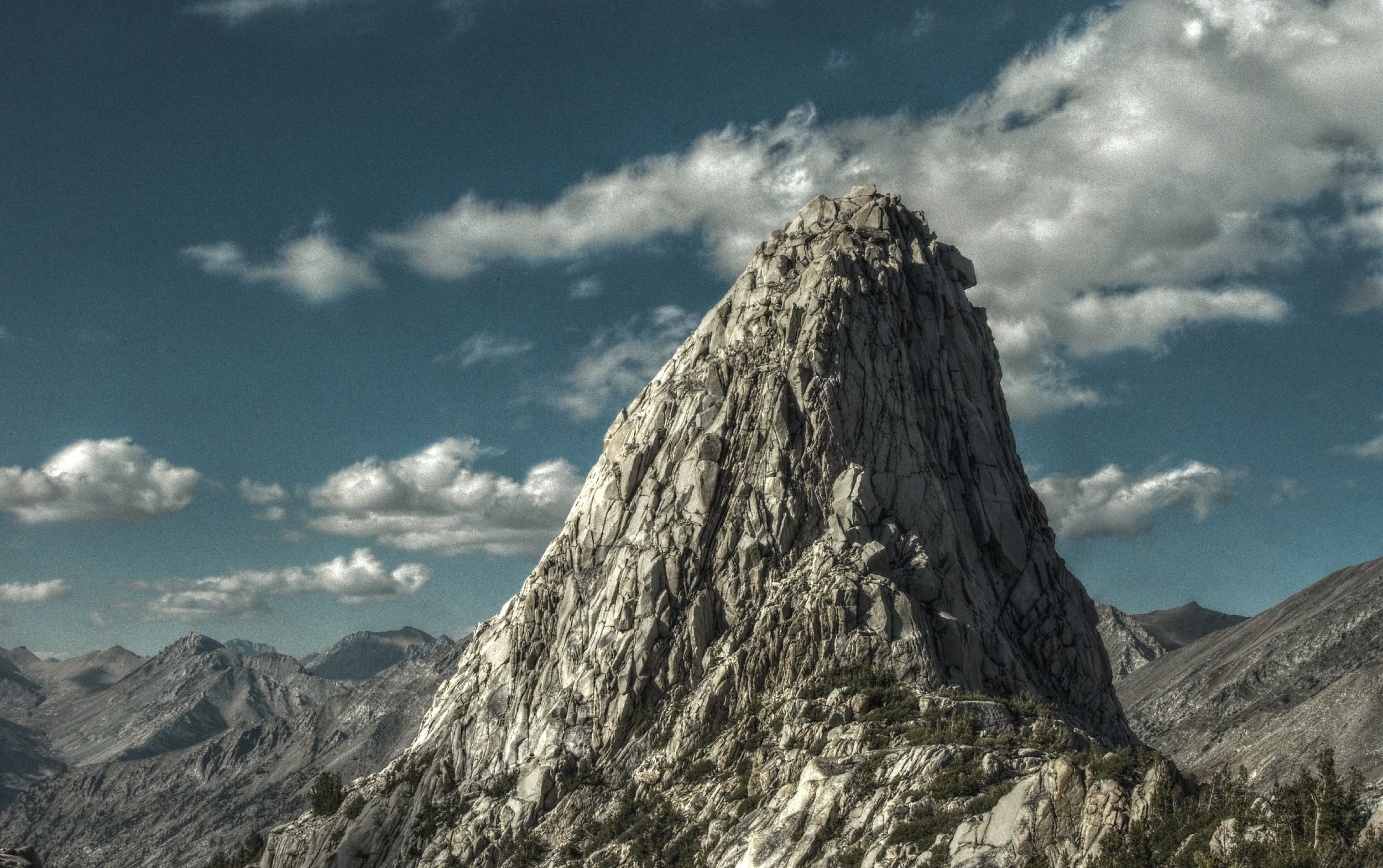

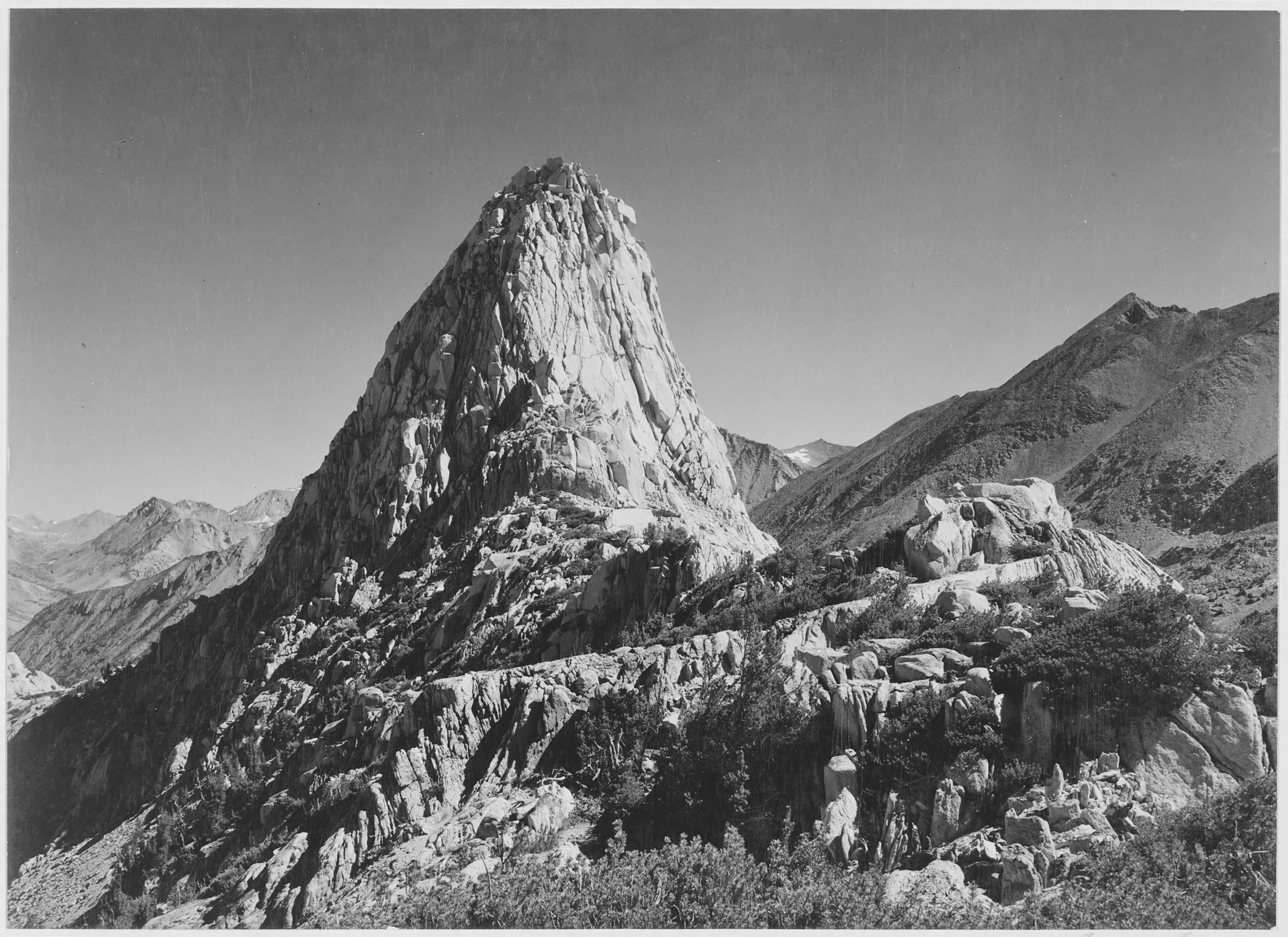
by Ansel Adams ca. 1941

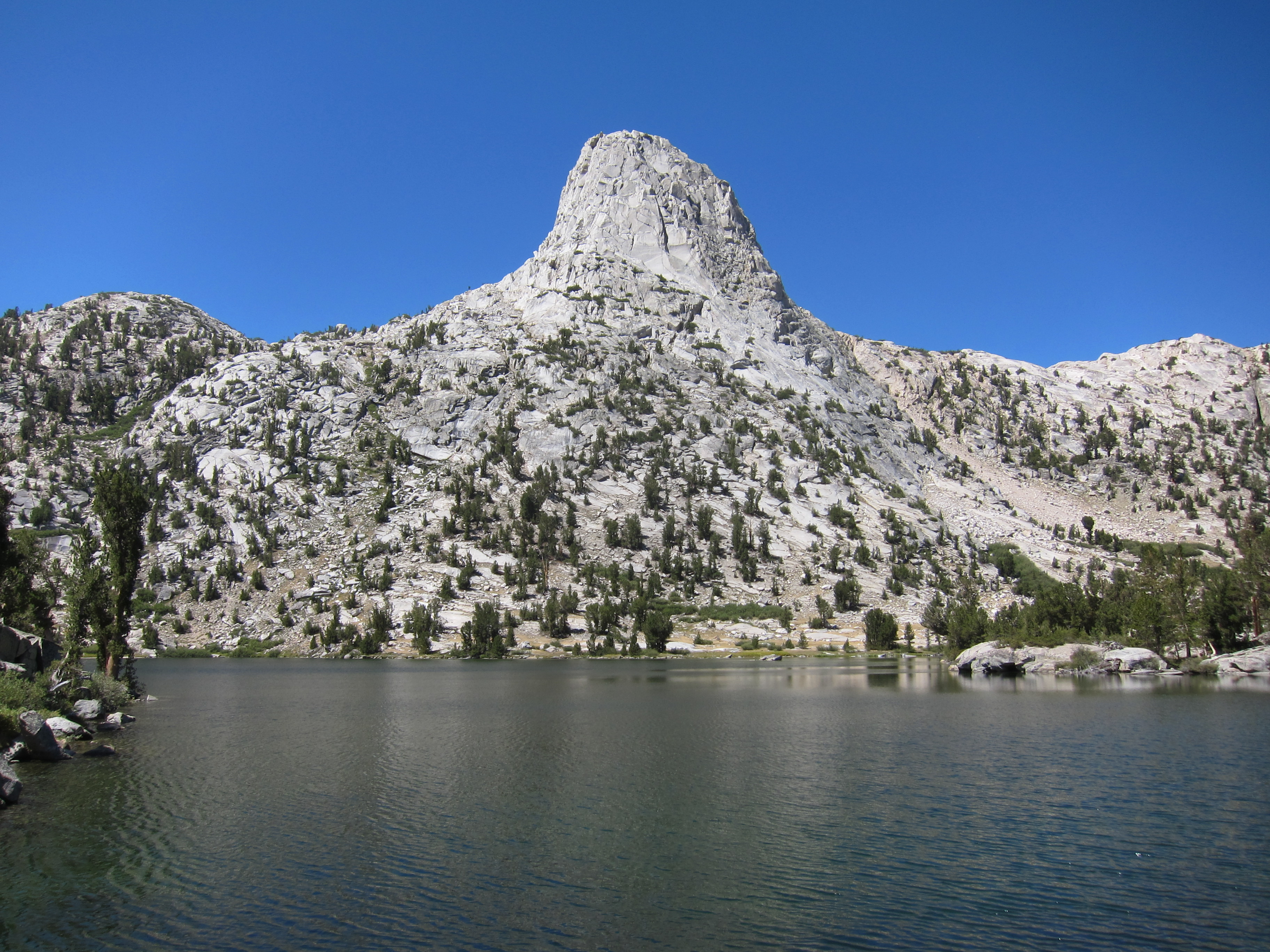
Fin Dome from Rae Lakes

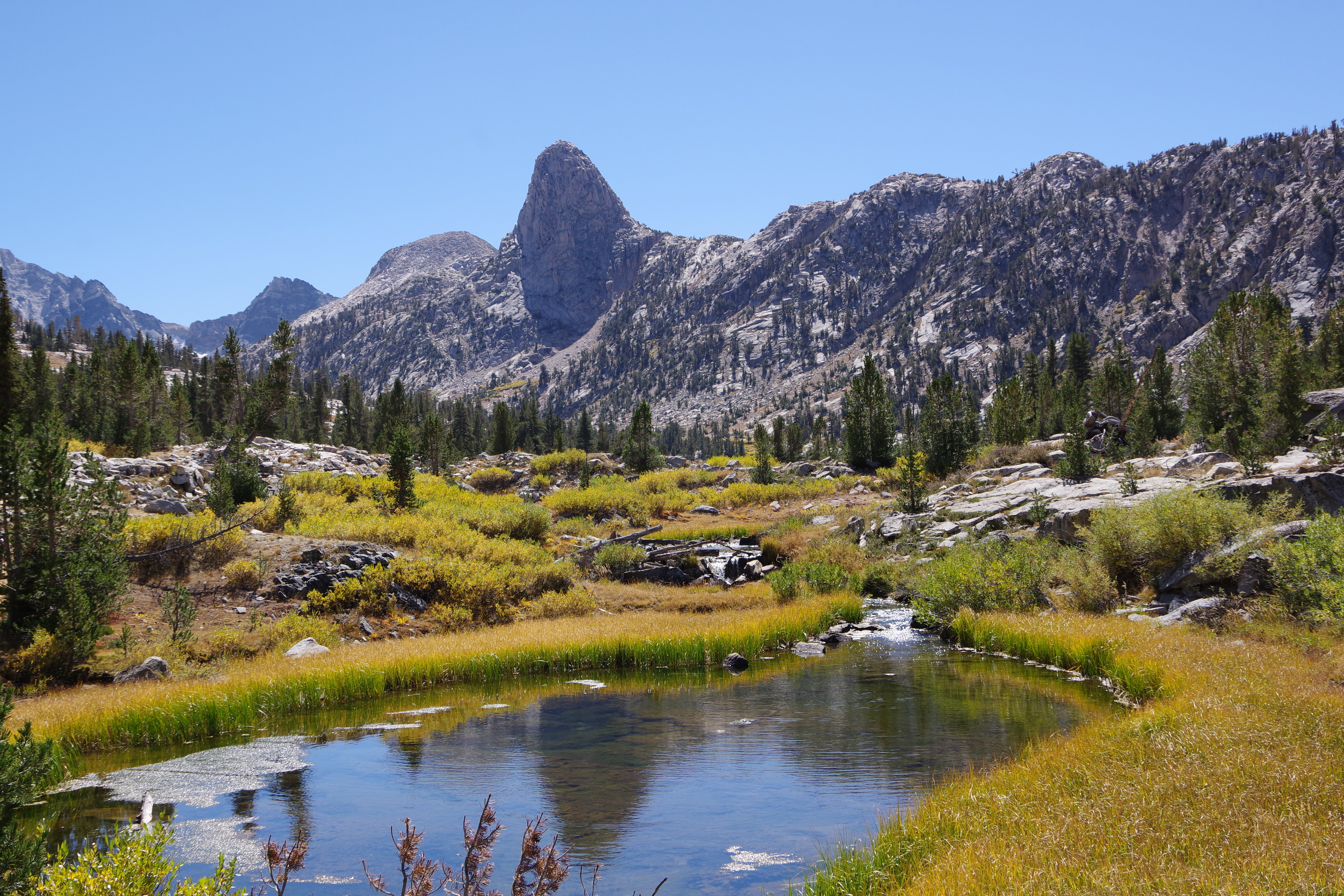
from the north

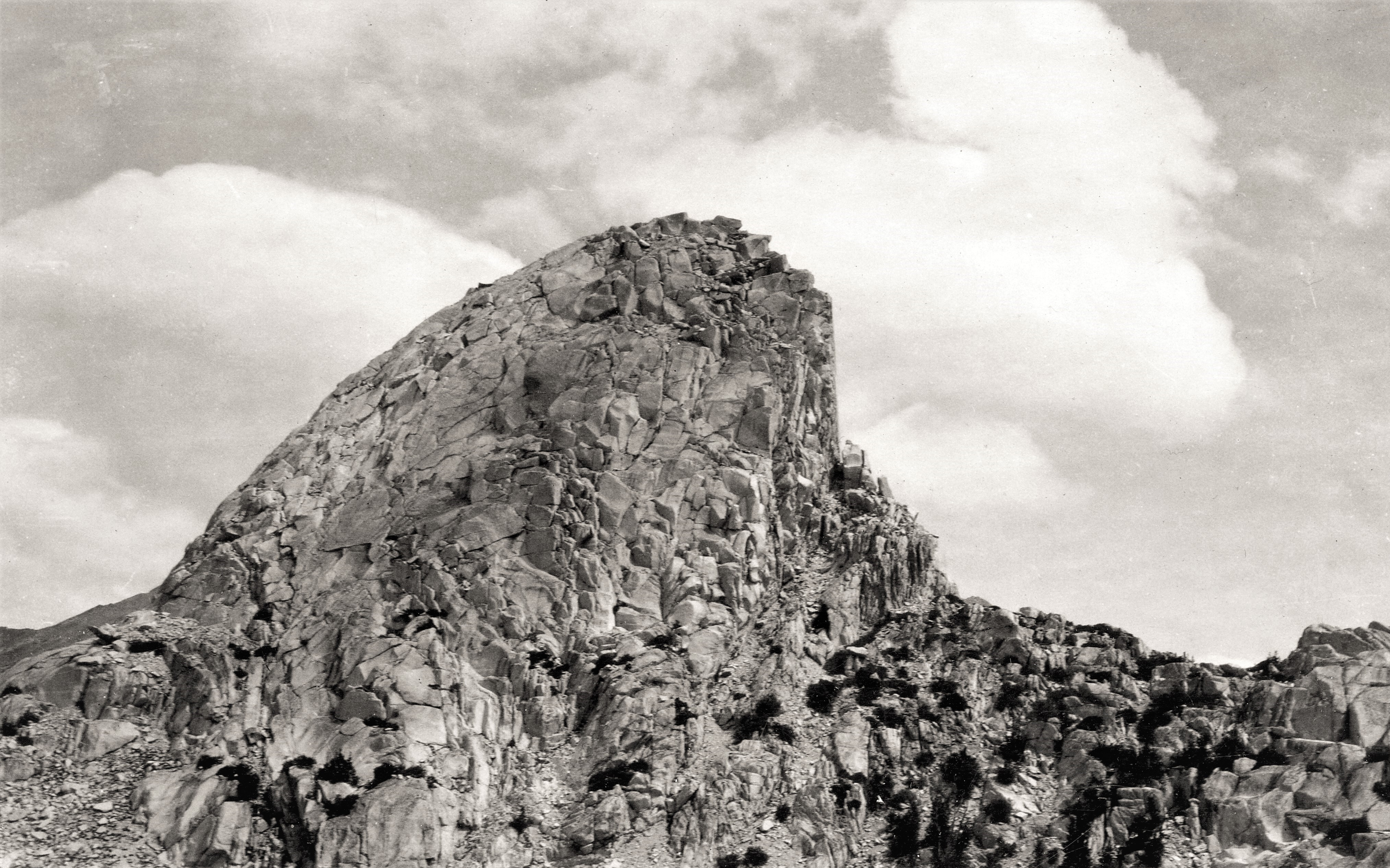
1925

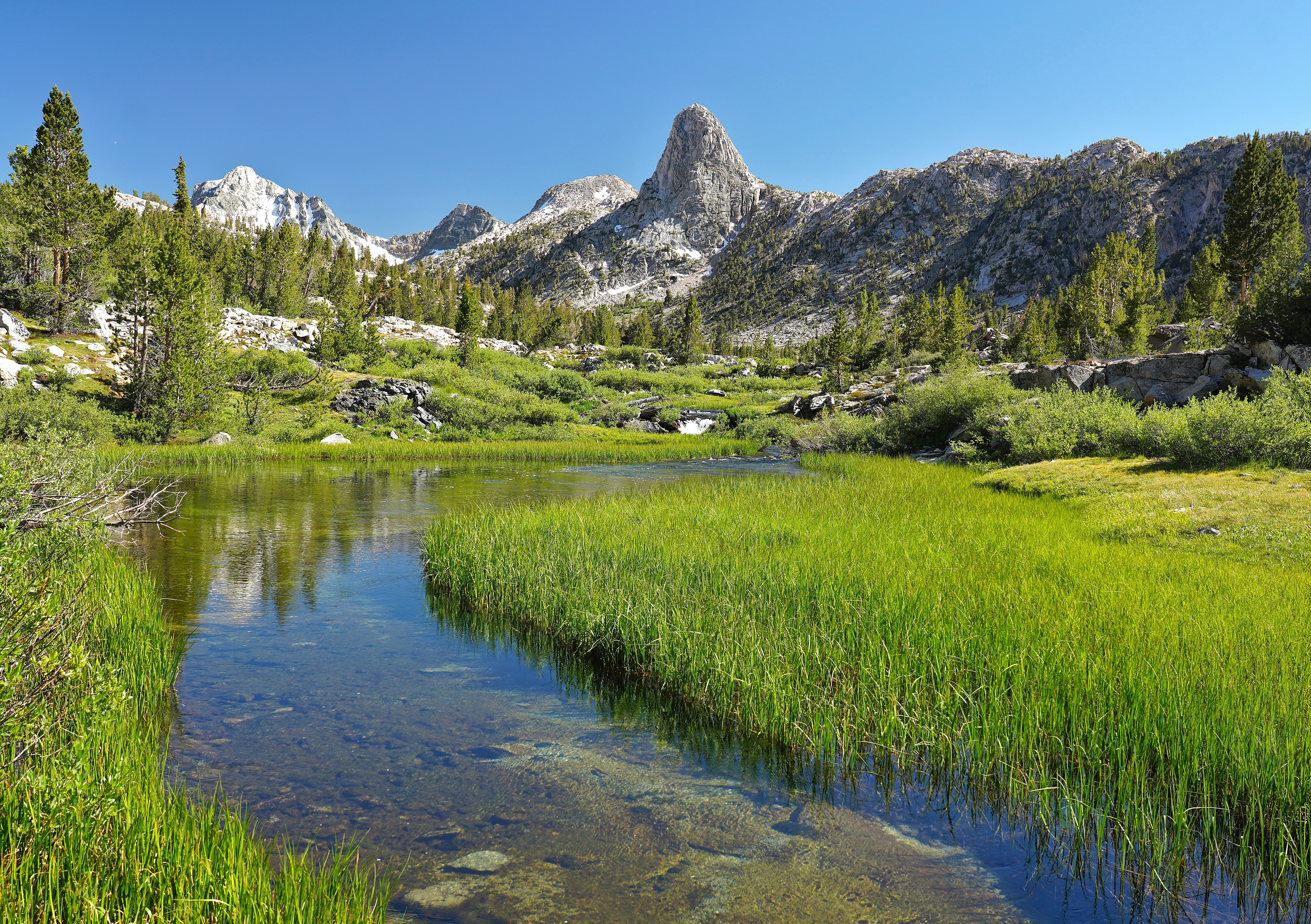
North aspect of Fin Dome viewed from the crossing of South Fork Woods Creek on the John Muir Trail

== See also ==
- List of mountain peaks of California
