= Painted Lady (disambiguation) =

Painted ladies, in the U.S., are Victorian houses repainted in bright polychrome

Painted lady or painted ladies (or capitalised versions) may refer to:

== Animals ==
- Any species of the Cynthia group of butterflies in the genus Vanessa, e.g. more specifically:
  - Painted lady (Vanessa cardui), a butterfly found on most continents except South America
  - American painted lady (Vanessa virginiensis), a butterfly found throughout North America
  - Australian painted lady (Vanessa kershawi), a butterfly mostly confined to Australia

== Arts and entertainment ==
=== Film ===
- The Painted Lady, a 1912 film directed by D. W. Griffith
- The Painted Lady (1924 film), an American drama film
- Painted Lady (TV series), a 1997 murder mystery drama starring Helen Mirren
- Painted Lady, a 2002 documentary short film about Vali Myers
- "The Painted Lady" (Avatar: The Last Airbender), an episode from the animated television series Avatar: The Last Airbender

=== Literature ===
- Painted Ladies (novel), a 2010 Spenser novel by Robert B. Parker

=== Music ===
- The Painted Ladies, an Australian band that performed at the National Indigenous Music Awards 2015
- "Painted Ladies" (song), the debut single by Ian Thomas
- "Painted Ladies", a track from the album Henry the Human Fly by Richard Thompson

== Plants ==
- Painted lady flowering bean or runner bean (Phaseolus coccineus)
- Painted-lady (Echeveria derenbergii), a succulent plant from Mexico
- Gladiolus carneus, also known as painted lady Gladiolus

== Other uses ==
- Painted Lady (mountain), a summit in California
