= Mount Rixford =

Mountain in the American state of California

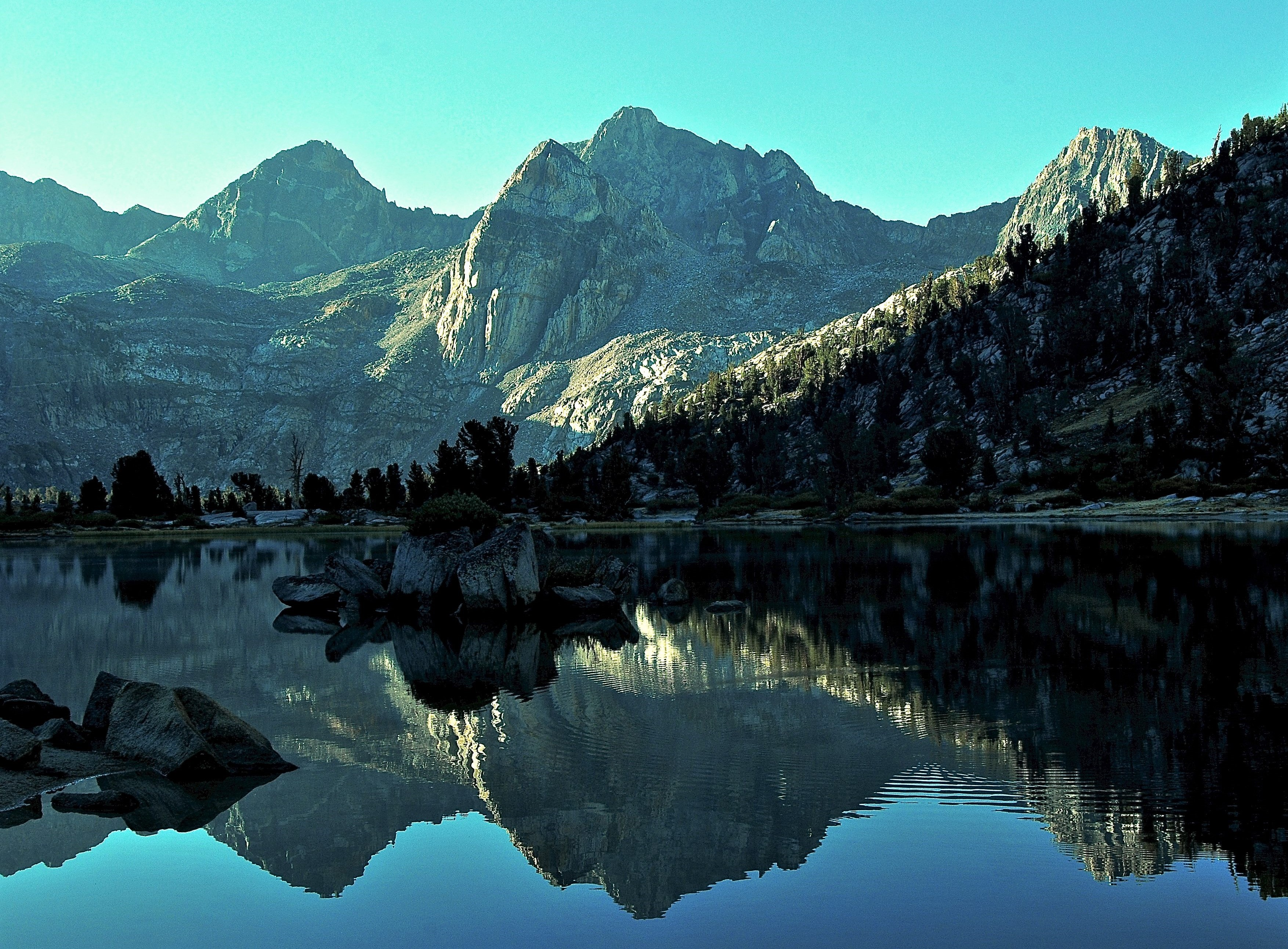
- North aspect reflected in Rae Lakes

Highest point
- Elevation: 12,887 ft (3,928 m)
- Prominence: 584 ft (178 m)
- Parent peak: Mount Gould (13,011 ft)
- Isolation: 1.20 mi (1.93 km),
- Listing: Sierra Peaks Section
- Coordinates: 36°47′05″N 118°23′56″W

Naming
- Etymology: Dr. Emmet Rixford

Geography
- Location within California Location within the United States
- Location: Kings Canyon National Park; Fresno County; California, U.S.
- Parent range: Sierra Nevada
- Topo map: USGS Mount Clarence King

Geology
- Mountain type: Fault block
- Rock type: Metamorphic rock

Climbing
- First ascent: 1897
- Easiest route: class 2 South slope

Mount Rixford is a 12,887-foot-elevation (3,928-meter) mountain summit located one mile west of the crest of the Sierra Nevada mountain range, in the southeast corner of Fresno County, in northern California. It is situated in Kings Canyon National Park, 11.5 miles (18.5 km) west of the community of Independence, and one mile north of the Kearsarge Pinnacles and Kearsarge Lakes. Topographic relief is significant as the north aspect rises 2,346 feet (715 meters) above Rae Lakes in one mile. The John Muir Trail crosses Glen Pass one mile to the west of this mountain. Mt. Rixford ranks as the 183rd highest summit in California. Painted Lady is a subsidiary summit at the end of Rixford's north ridge.

== History ==
This geographical feature was named for world-famous San Francisco surgeon Dr. Emmet Rixford (1865–1938), who made the first ascent of the summit in 1897 with two companions. As a Sierra Club explorer, he enjoyed mountaineering with companions such as the naturalist John Muir. Dr. Rixford was the president of the American Surgical Association in 1927. The mountain was named in 1899 by an ascent party from Stanford University who found Rixford's name in the summit cairn. That subsequent party was David Starr Jordan, Vernon Lyman Kellogg, Ellwood Patterson Cubberley and Mrs. Cubberley. Theirs was the third ascent of the peak, the second ascent was made by Bolton Brown in the intervening year.

== Climate ==
According to the Köppen climate classification system, Mount Rixford is located in an alpine climate zone. Most weather fronts originate in the Pacific Ocean, and travel east toward the Sierra Nevada mountains. As fronts approach, they are forced upward by the peaks, causing them to drop their moisture in the form of rain or snowfall onto the range (orographic lift). Precipitation runoff from this peak drains into tributaries of the South Fork Kings River.

== Gallery ==
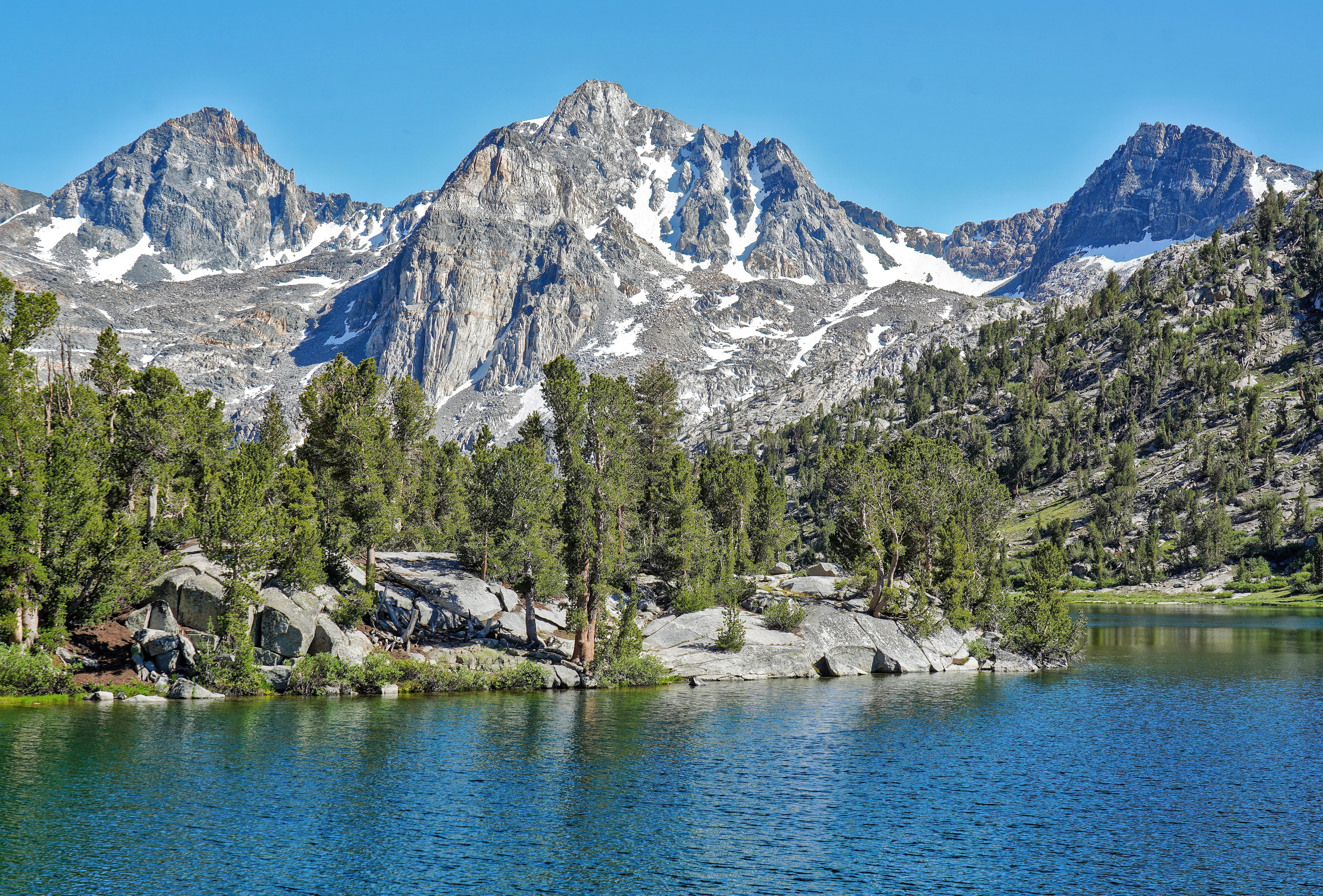
Left to rightː Falcor Peak, Painted Lady, Mount Rixford, Glacier Spike

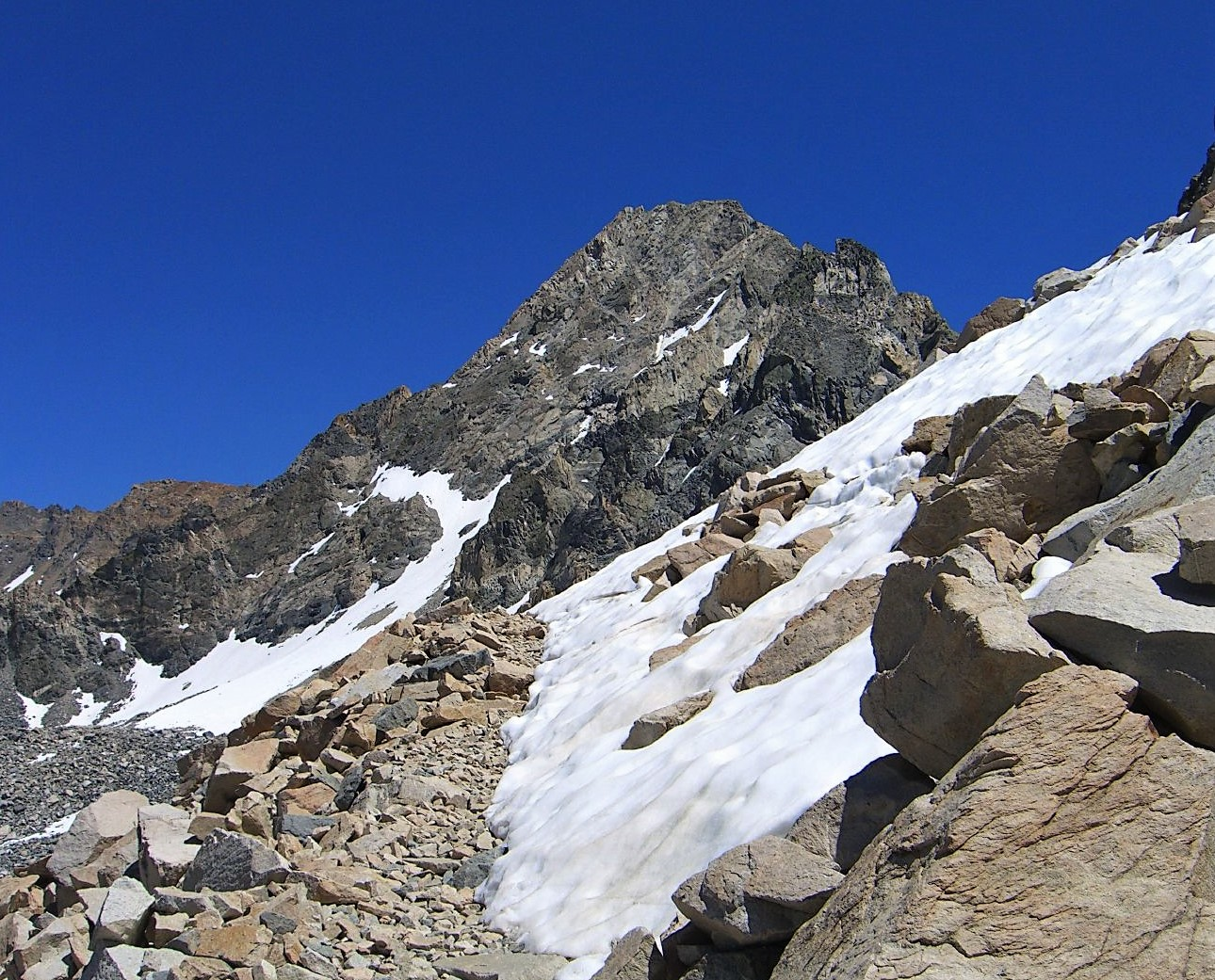
Mount Rixford from John Muir Trail below Glen Pass

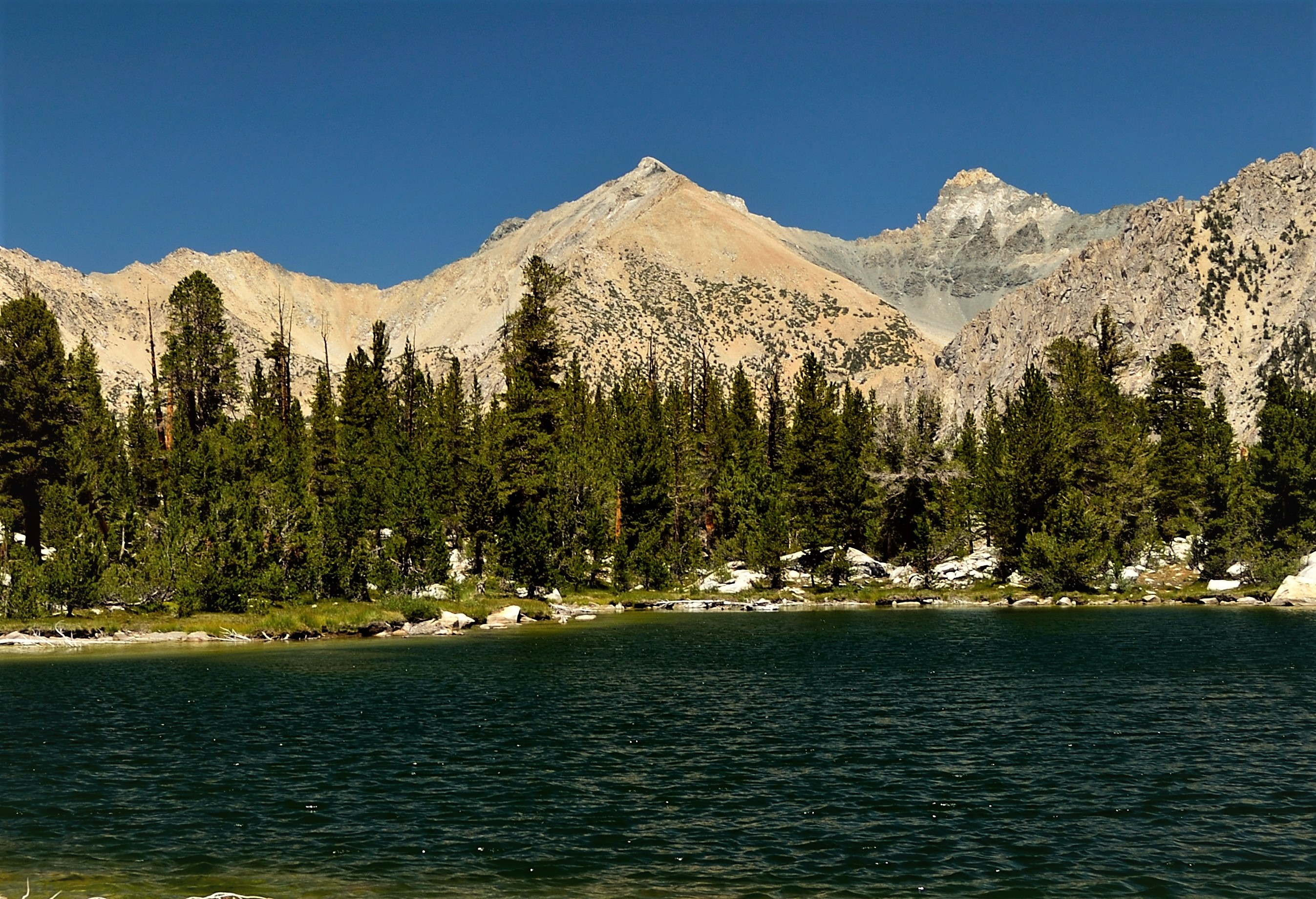
South aspect of Mt. Rixford (centered), from Vidette Lakes.
(Falcor Peak to right)

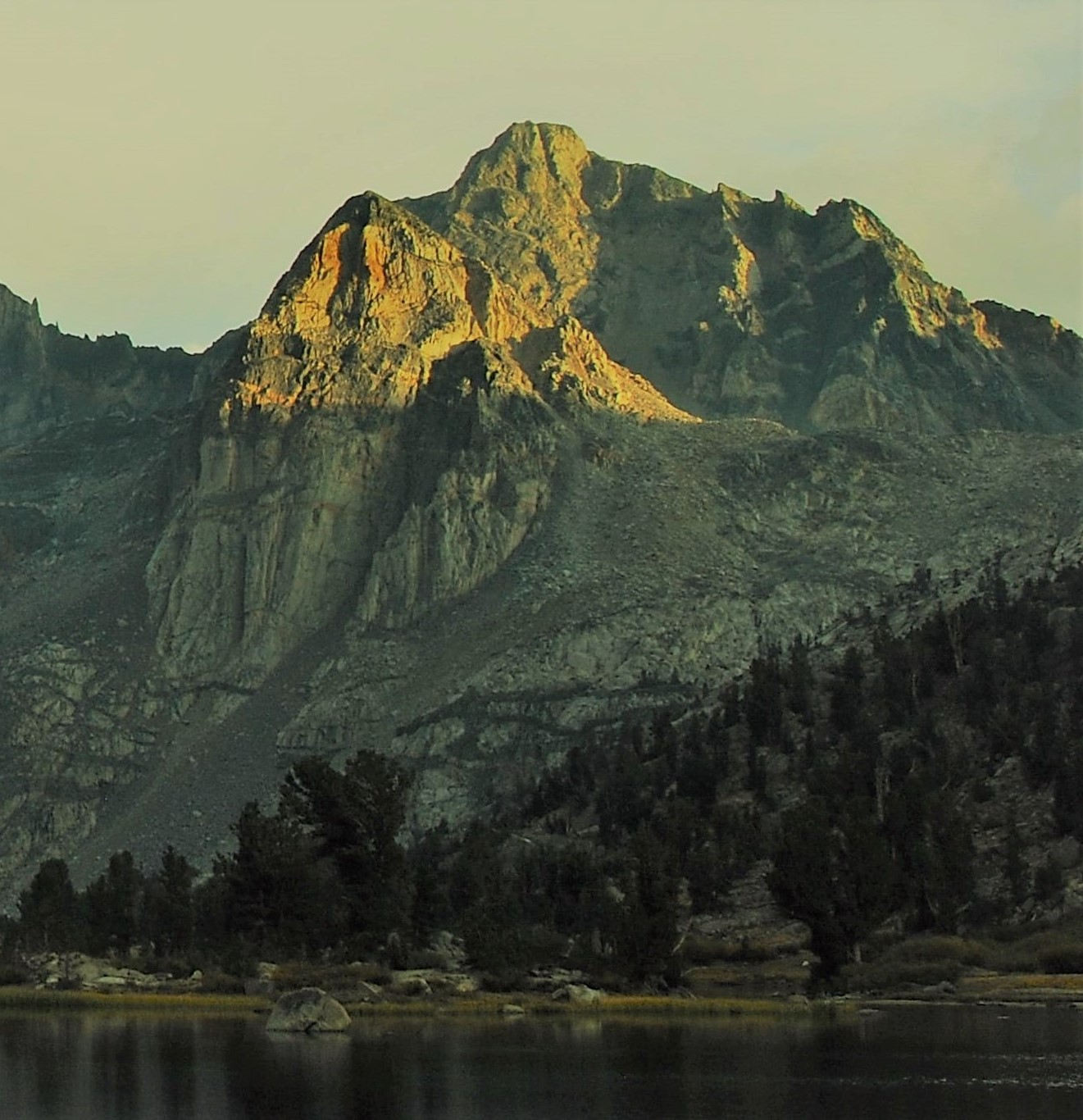
Mt. Rixford behind Painted Lady

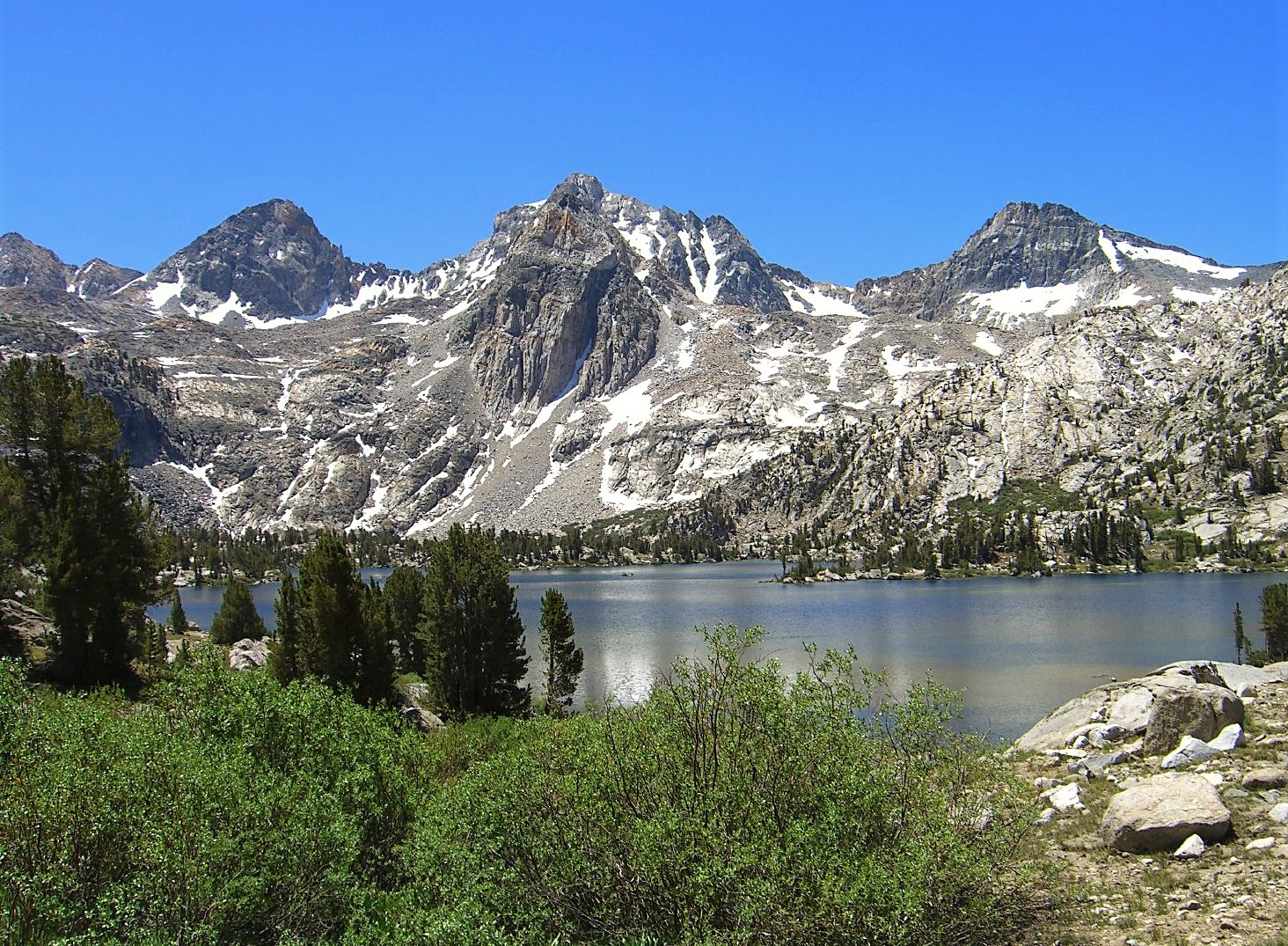
Mt. Rixford behind Painted Lady, from Rae Lakes

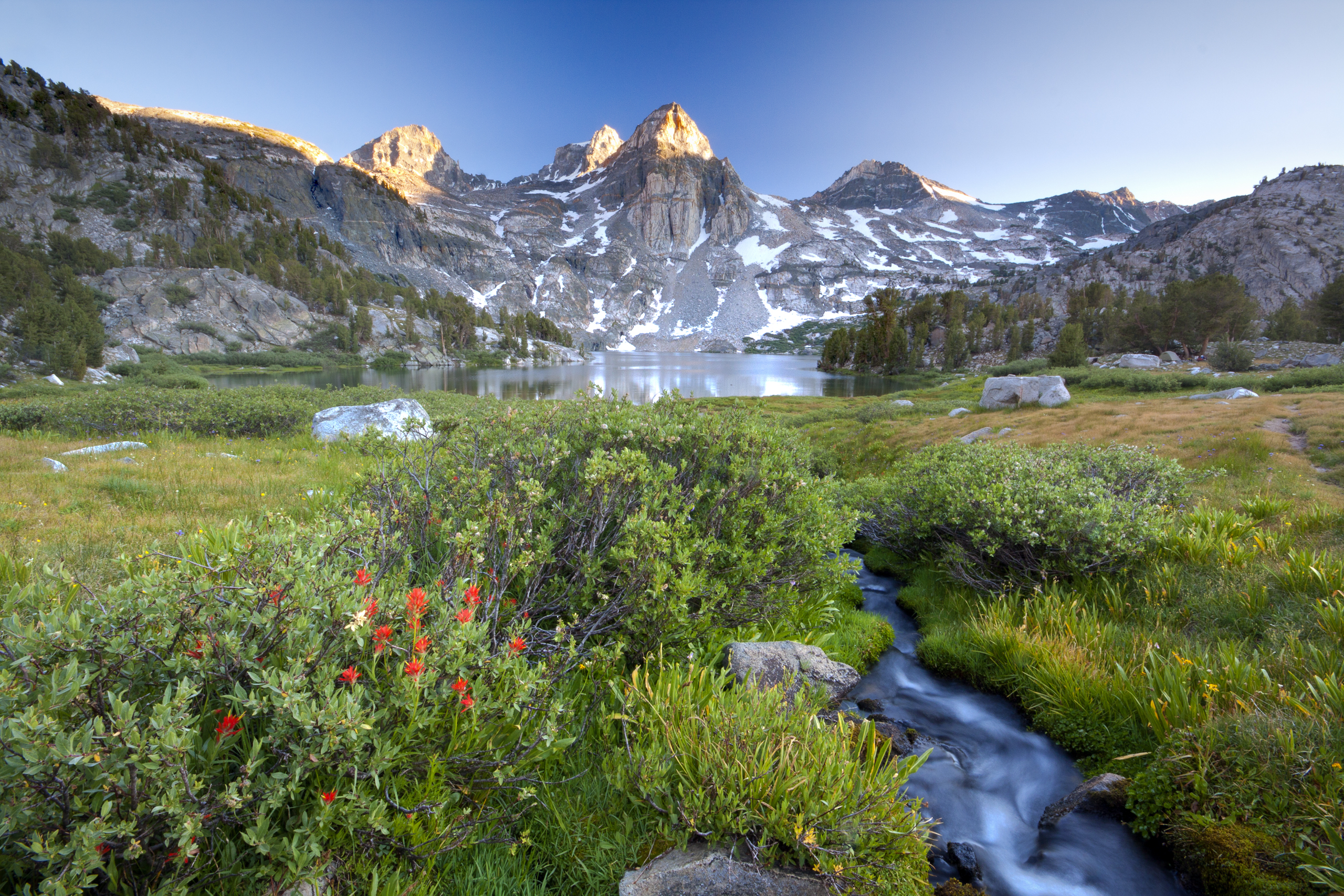
Painted Lady centered with Mt. Rixford behind left

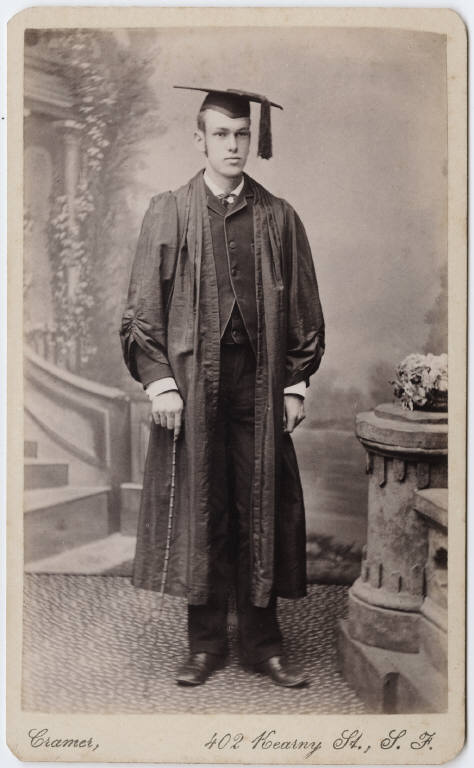
Dr. Emmet Rixord, 1887

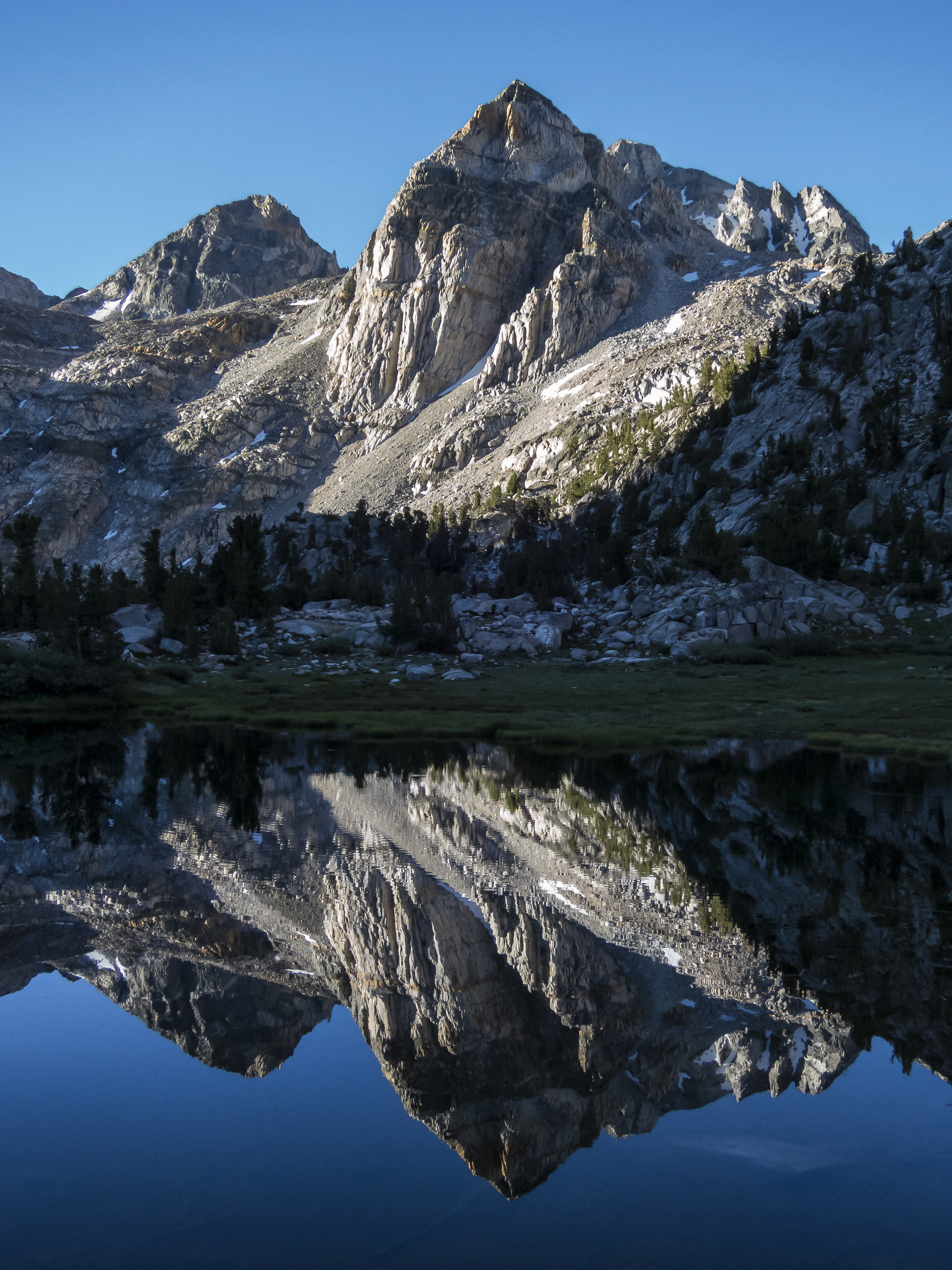
Painted Lady with partly visible Mt. Rixford behind right

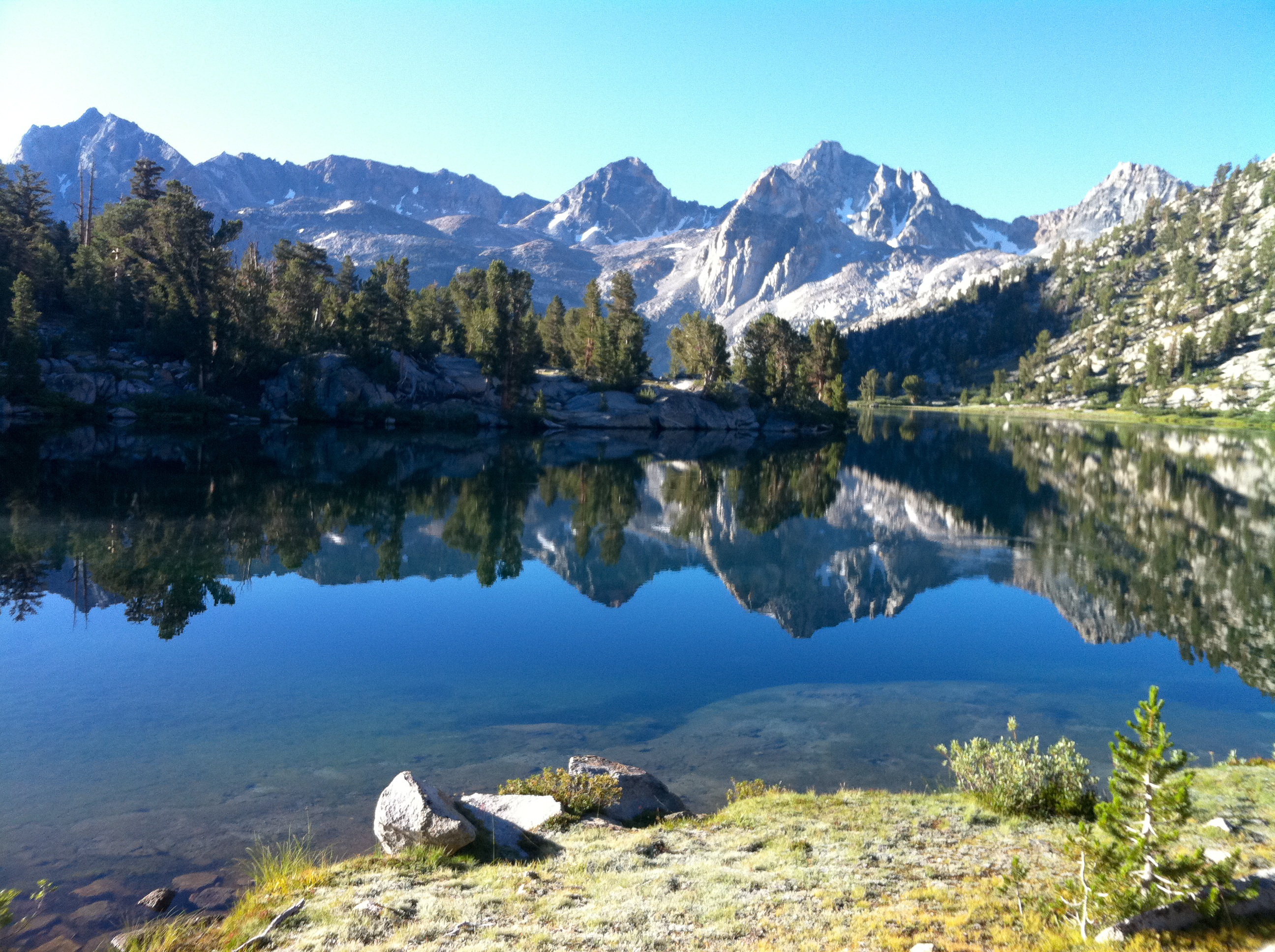
Mt. Rixford to right of center

== See also ==
- List of mountain peaks of California
