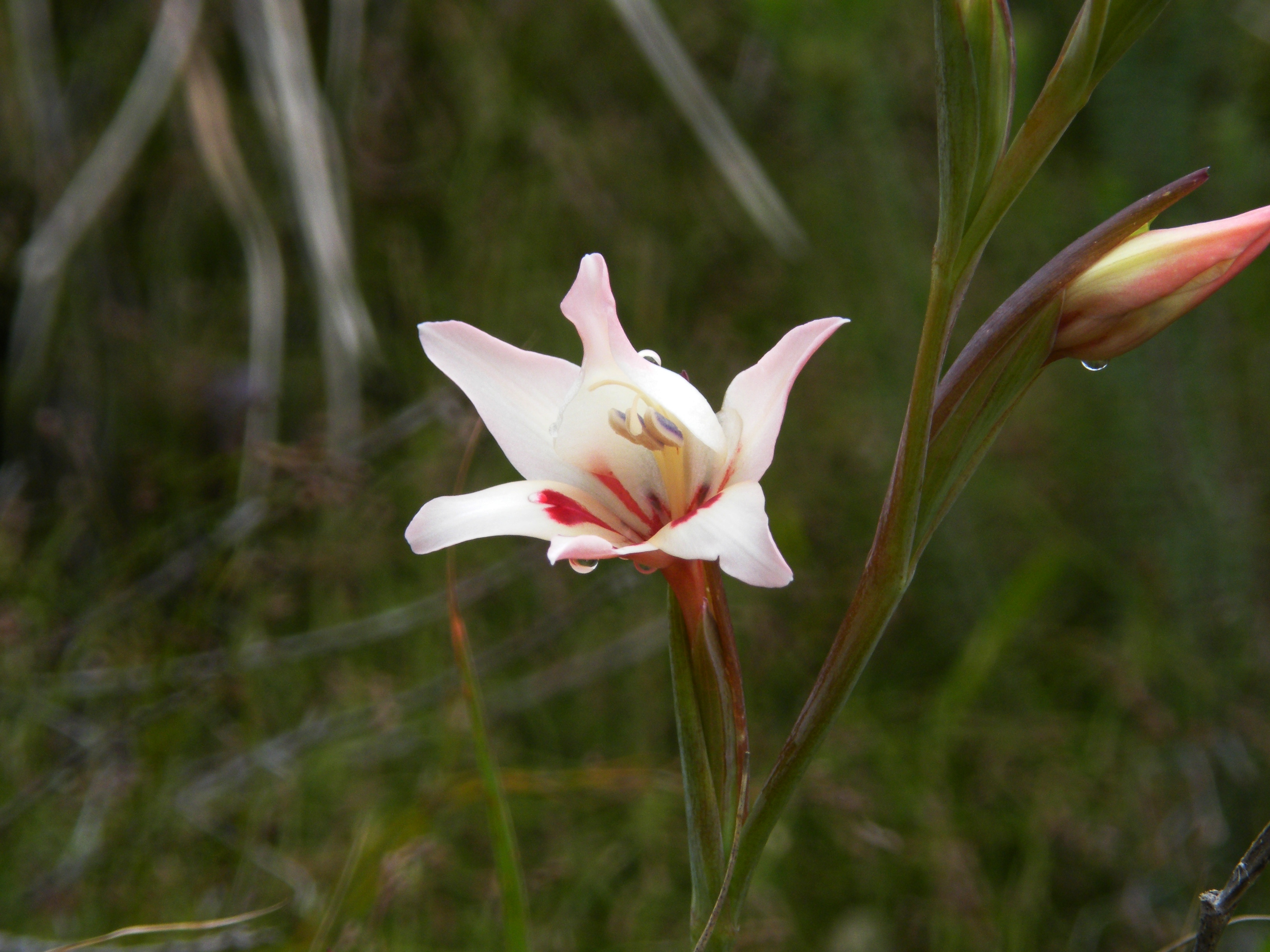

Scientific classification
- Kingdom: Plantae
- Clade: Tracheophytes
- Clade: Angiosperms
- Clade: Monocots
- Order: Asparagales
- Family: Iridaceae
- Genus: Gladiolus
- Species: G. carneus

Binomial name
- Gladiolus carneus F.Delaroche

= Gladiolus carneus =

Species of flowering plant

Gladiolus carneus is a plant species in the family Iridaceae.

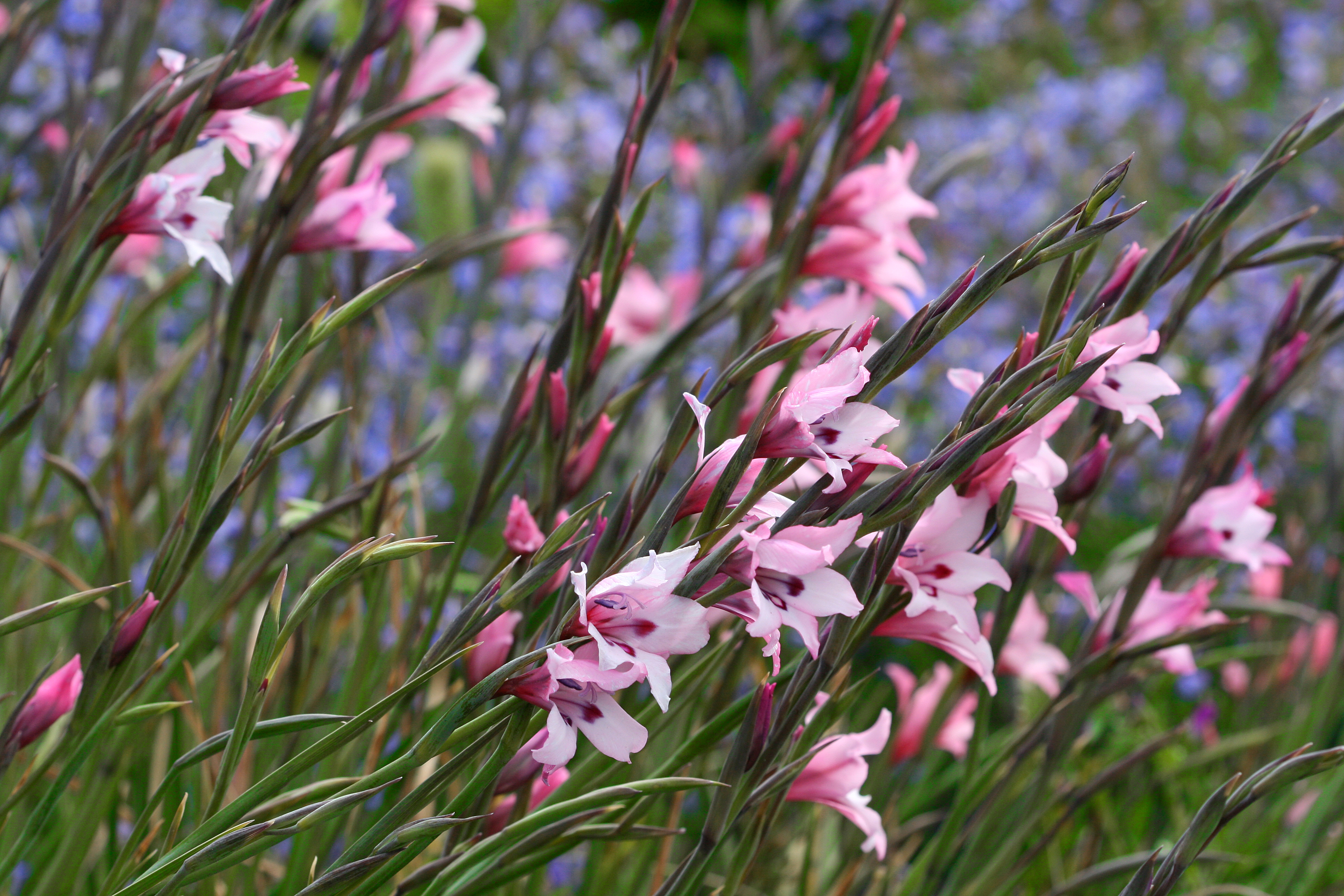
Gladiolus carneus

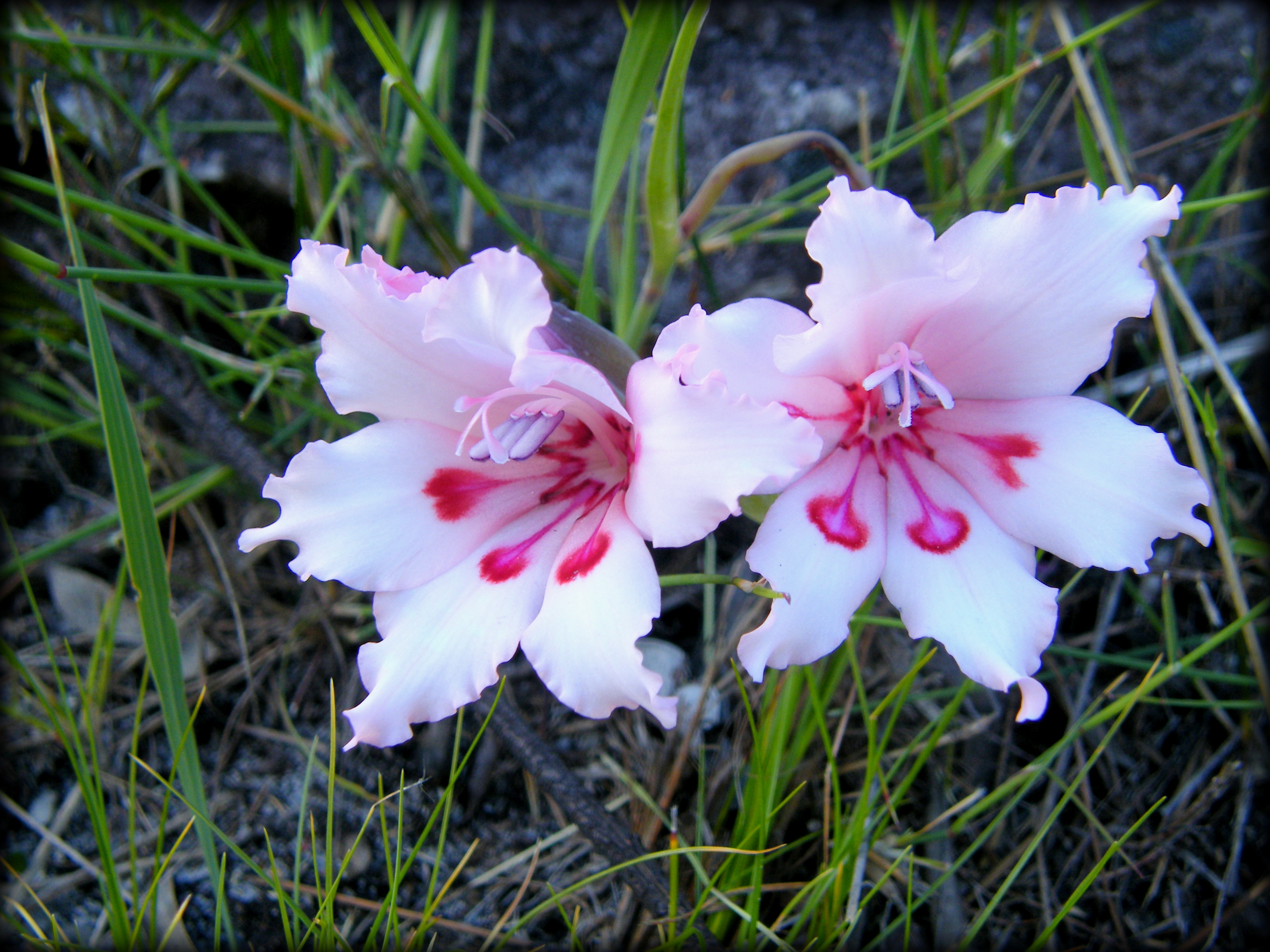
Gladiolus carneus

Common name for this plant is Painted Lady Gladiolus. A tunicated corm, it is summer dormant. Native to South Africa in a dry summer - wet winter climate. Grows about 50 cm high. Very ornamental and a good cut flower.

== Cultivation ==
Gladiolus carneus grows well in the ground in Mediterranean climates or anywhere in pots. It reliably comes back. Can be dug and stored for the summer. Keep it dry in the summer. Plant in autumn with 5 cm (2 in) of soil over the bulb and 5 – 10 cm (2 - 4 inches) apart.
