= Charlotte Lake (California) =

Lake in the state of California, United States

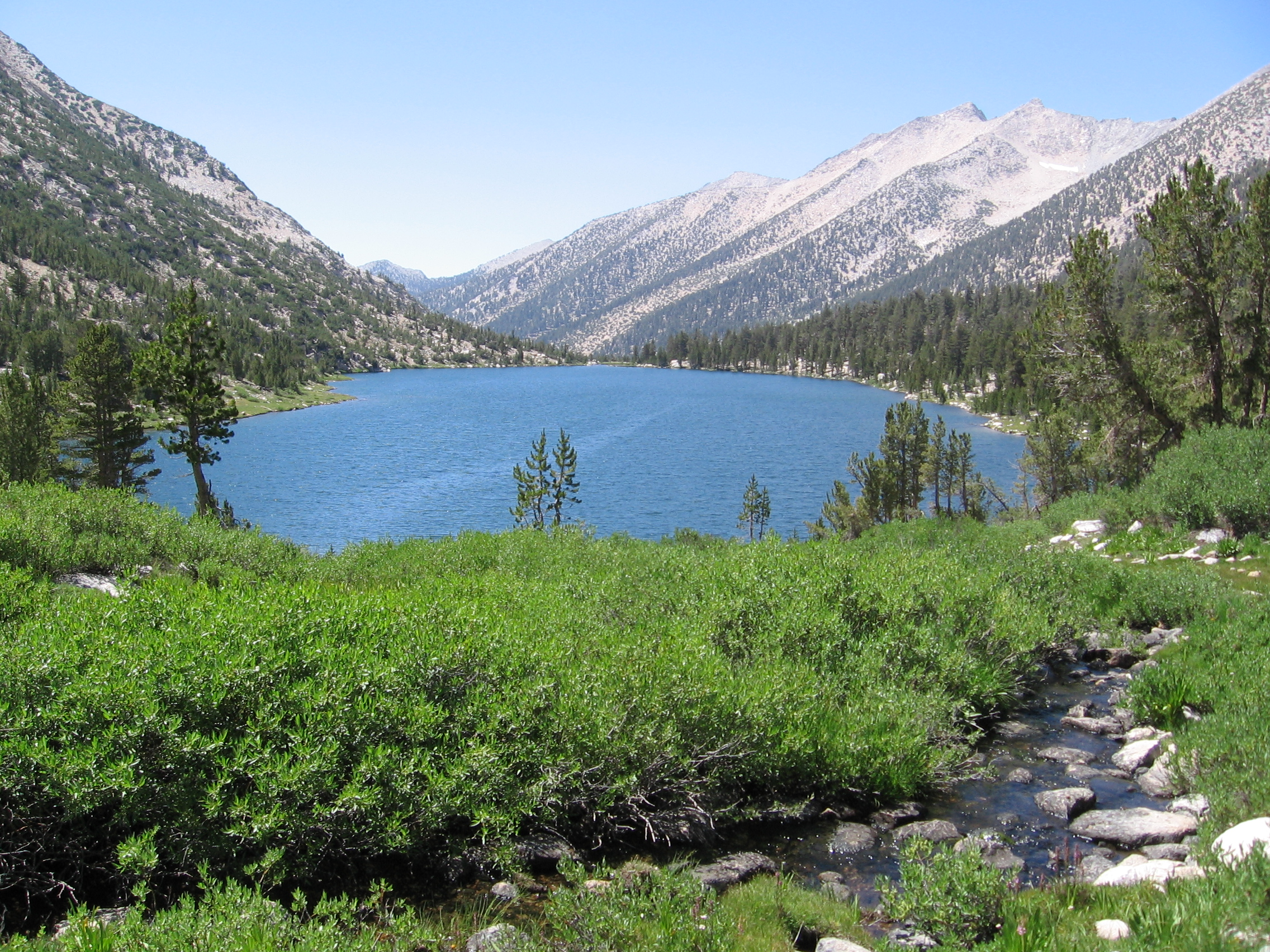
- Charlotte Lake in July

- Location within California Location within the United States
- Location: Kings Canyon National Park, Fresno County, California, US
- Coordinates: 36°46′31″N 118°25′43″W
- Primary outflows: Charlotte Creek
- Basin countries: United States
- Surface elevation: 10,544 feet (3,214 m)

Charlotte Lake (also known as Charlotta Lake, or Rhoda Lake) is a lake in the Sierra Nevada, located in Kings Canyon National Park, eastern Fresno County, California. The lake is located on the John Muir Trail, at an elevation of 10,544 feet (3,214 m).

== See also ==
- Charlotte Dome
- List of lakes in California
