= Glen Pass =

Mountain pass in the Sierra Nevada, California

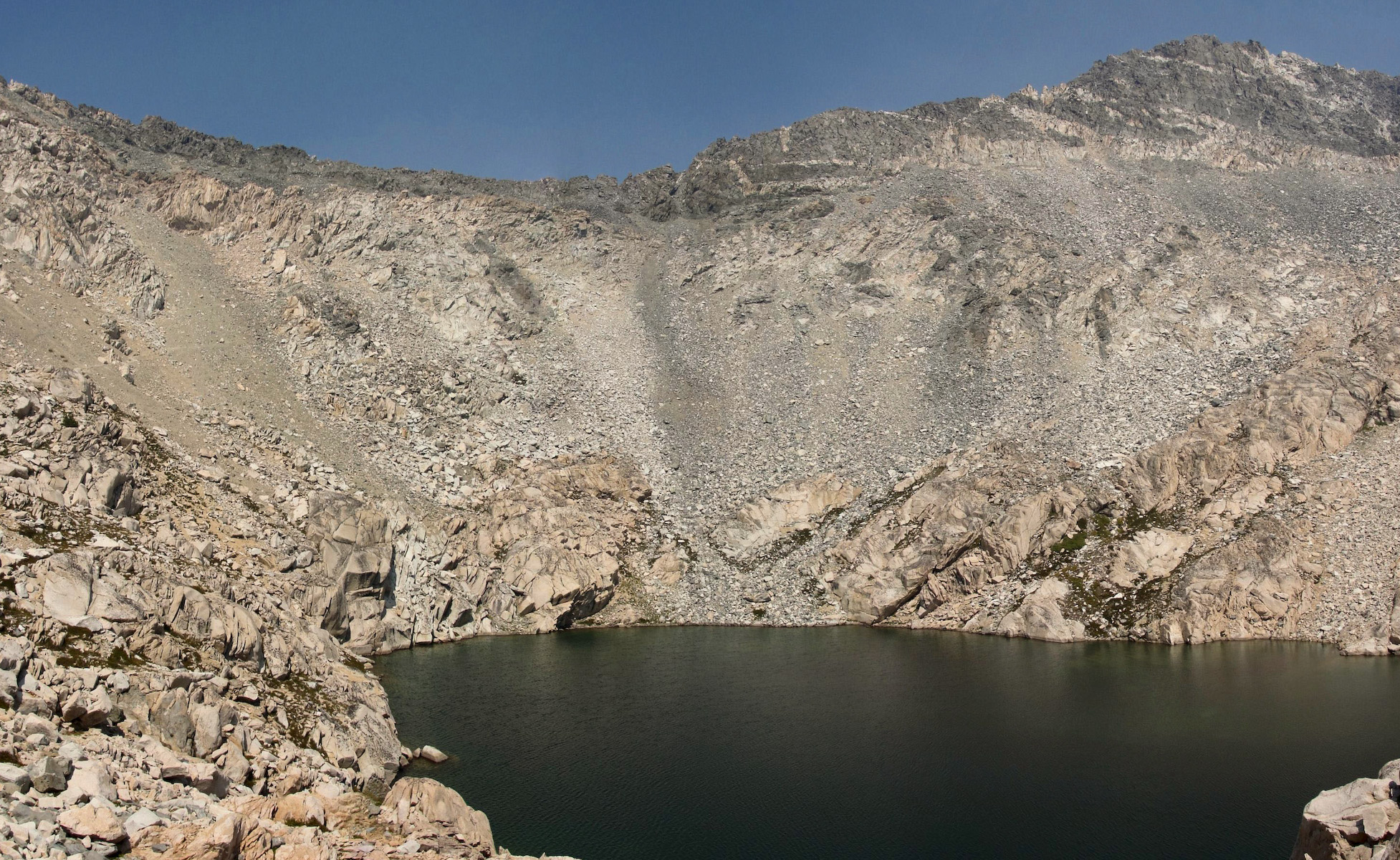
- Glen Pass from the south

- Location within California
- Elevation: 11,926 feet (3,635 m)
- Traversed by: John Muir Trail, Pacific Crest Trail

Third Approach
- Location: Fresno County, California, United States
- Range: Sierra Nevada
- Coordinates: 36°47′20″N 118°24′45″W
- Topo map: USGS Mount Clarence King

Glen Pass (also known as Blue Flower Pass) is a mountain pass in the Sierra Nevada, located in Kings Canyon National Park, eastern Fresno County, California, United States. This pass, on the John Muir Trail, links Rae Lakes at 10,544 feet (3,214 m) elevation with Charlotte Lake at 11,926 feet (3,635 m) elevation.

The pass was named after Glen H. Crow, a Forest Service ranger.
