= Kearsarge =

Kearsarge may refer to:

== Places in the United States ==
- Kearsarge, California, in Inyo County
- Kearsarge, Michigan, in Houghton County
- Kearsarge, New Hampshire, a village in Carroll County
- Mount Kearsarge (Merrimack County, New Hampshire), mountain in the New Hampshire towns of Wilmot, Sutton, and Warner
  - Kearsarge Regional High School, serving several towns in Merrimack County, New Hampshire
- Kearsarge North, a peak in the White Mountains of New Hampshire
  - Kearsarge House, grand hotel in North Conway, New Hampshire
- Kearsarge Pass, a mountain pass in the Sierra Nevada of California
- Kearsarge Peak, a mountain in Inyo County, California
- Kearsarge Pinnacles, pillars in Kings Canyon National Park, California

== Ships ==
- USS Kearsarge, several ships in the United States Navy
- Kearsarge-class battleship in the U.S. Navy

== See also ==
- The Battle of the Kearsarge and the Alabama
- The Kearsarge at Boulogne
