= Mount Bago =

Mountain in California, United States

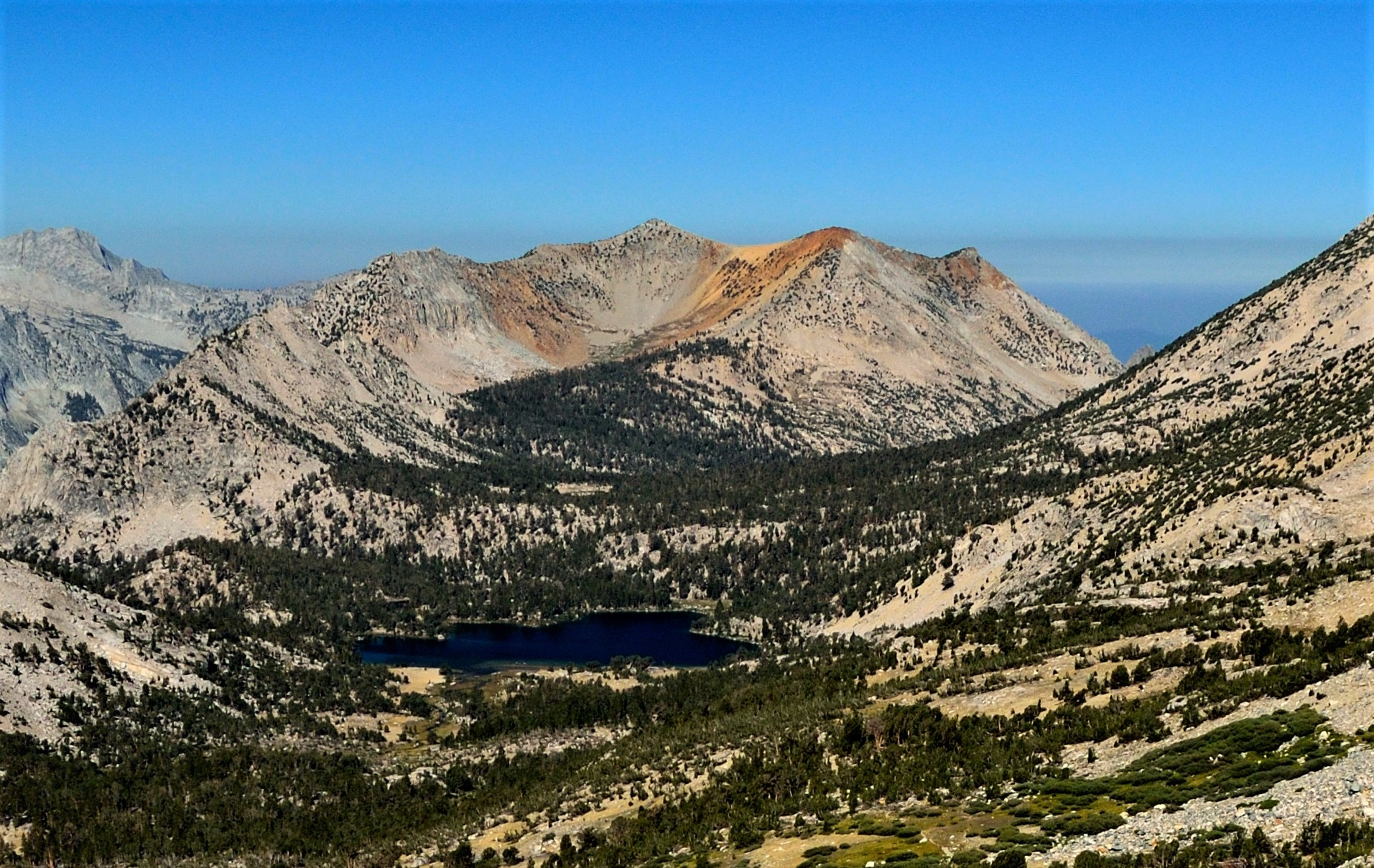
- East aspect, with Bullfrog Lake

Highest point
- Elevation: 11,870 ft (3,620 m)
- Prominence: 1,142 ft (348 m)
- Parent peak: Peak 12565
- Isolation: 2.02 mi (3.25 km)
- Listing: Sierra Peaks Section
- Coordinates: 36°46′12″N 118°26′17″W

Naming
- Etymology: Unknown

Geography
- Location within California Location within the United States
- Country: United States
- State: California
- County: Fresno
- Protected area: Kings Canyon National Park
- Parent range: Sierra Nevada
- Topo map: USGS Mount Clarence King

Geology
- Mountain type: Fault block
- Rock type: Metamorphic rock

Climbing
- First ascent: 1896
- Easiest route: class 2 East slope

Mount Bago is an 11,870-foot-elevation (3,620-meter) mountain summit located west of the crest of the Sierra Nevada mountain range, in the southeast corner of Fresno County, in northern California. It is situated in Kings Canyon National Park, 14 miles (23 km) west of the community of Independence, 2.3 miles west of the Kearsarge Pinnacles, and 2.4 miles southwest of Mount Rixford. Topographic relief is significant as the south aspect rises 3,675 feet (1,120 meters) above Junction Meadow in one mile. The John Muir Trail passes to the northeast of this remote geographical feature. The first ascent of the summit was made July 11, 1896, by Joseph Nisbet LeConte and Wilson S. Gould.

== Climate ==
According to the Köppen climate classification system, Mount Bago is located in an alpine climate zone. Most weather fronts originate in the Pacific Ocean, and travel east toward the Sierra Nevada mountains. As fronts approach, they are forced upward by the peaks, causing them to drop their moisture in the form of rain or snowfall onto the range (orographic lift). Precipitation runoff from the peak drains into tributaries of Bubbs Creek, which in turn is a tributary of the South Fork Kings River.

== See also ==
- List of mountain peaks of California

== Gallery ==
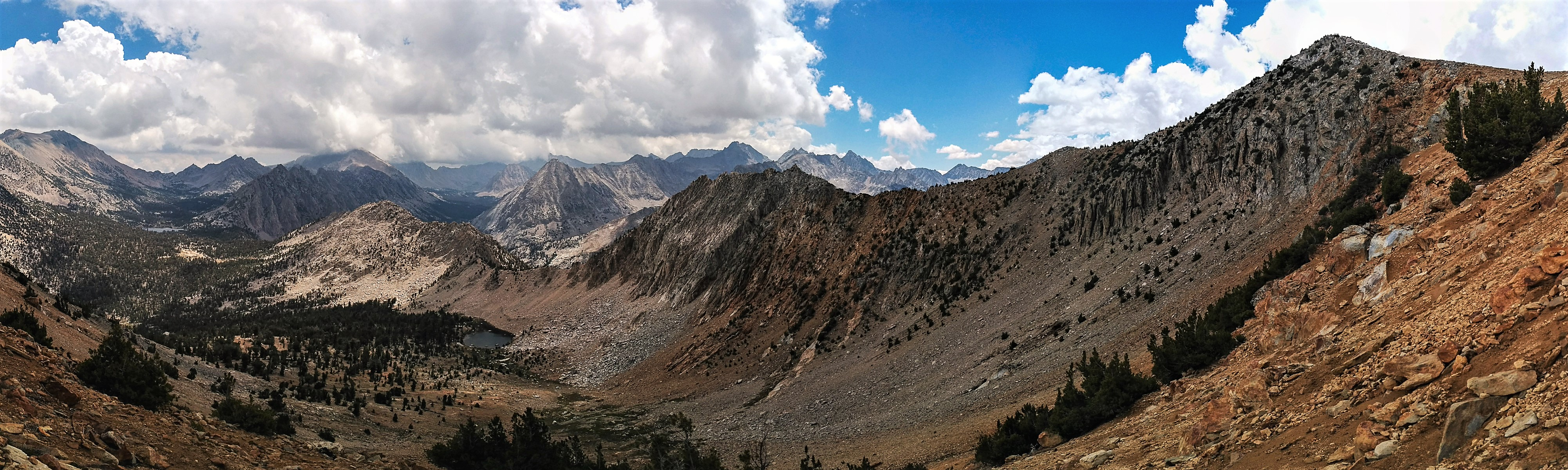
Mount Bago in upper right.
(Kearsarge Pinnacles and East Vidette in the distance to left.)

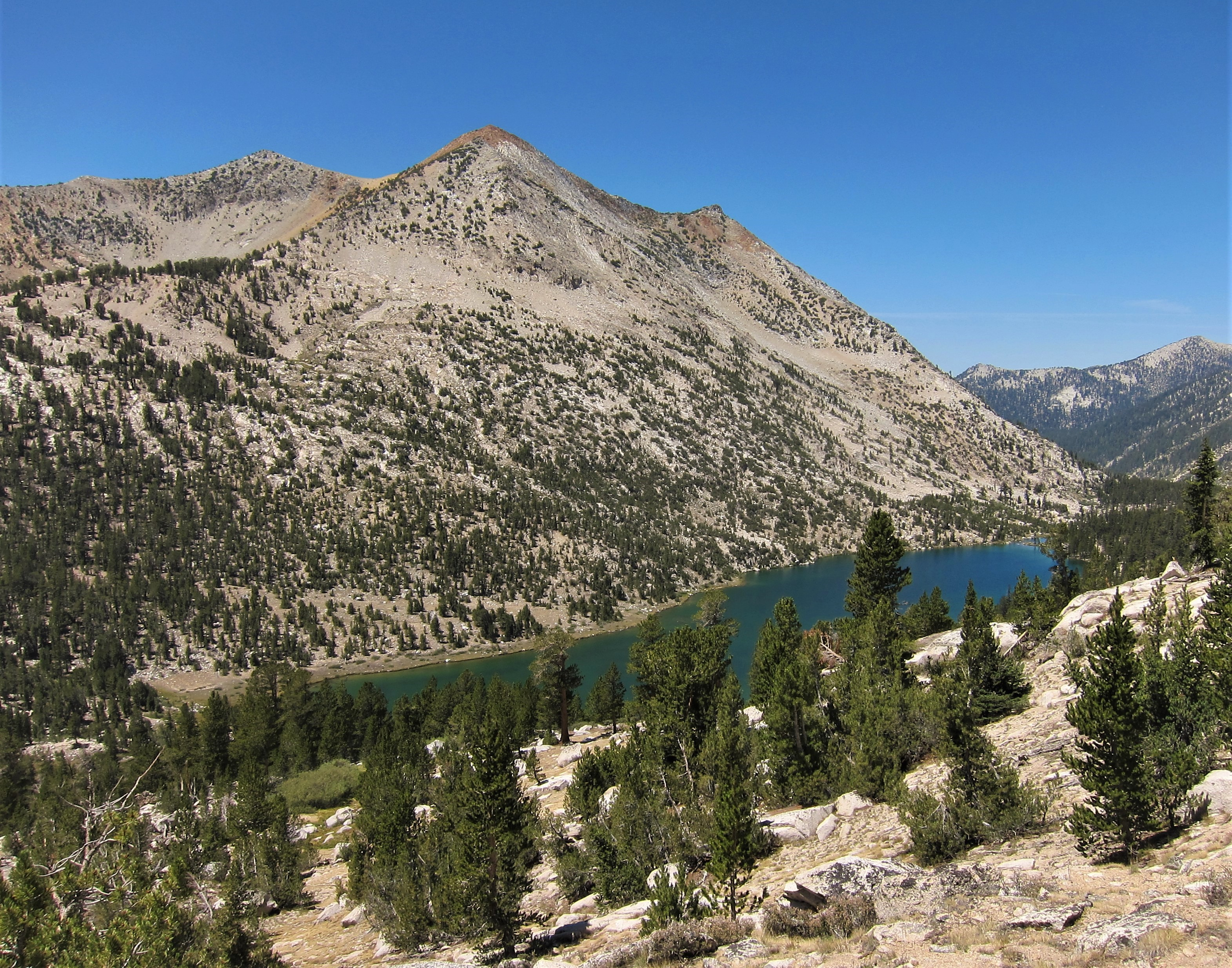
Mt. Bago above Charlotte Lake, from northeast on JMT.

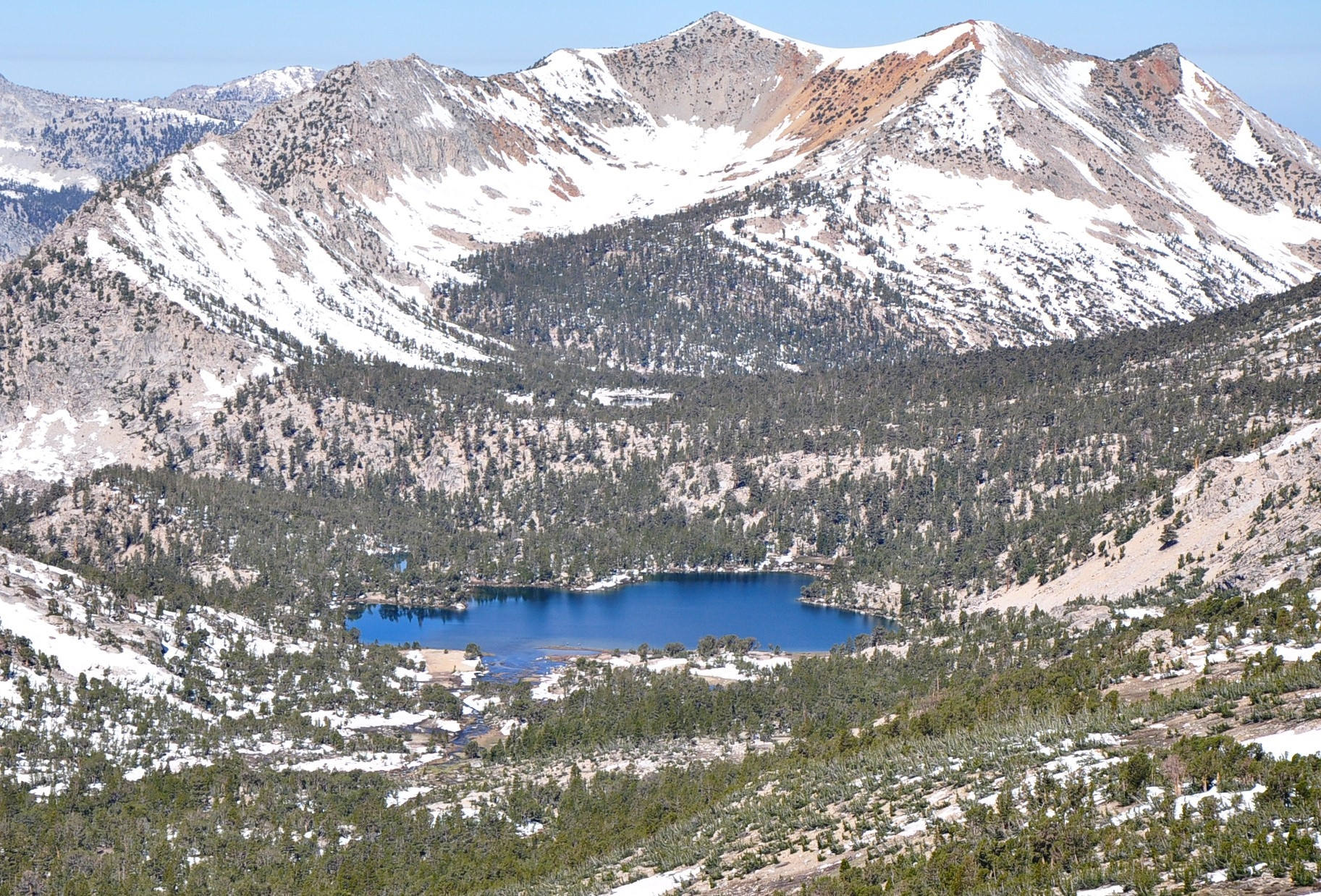
Mount Bago and Bullfrog Lake viewed from Kearsarge Pass
