= Alabama Hills =

Hills and rock formations in California, U.S.

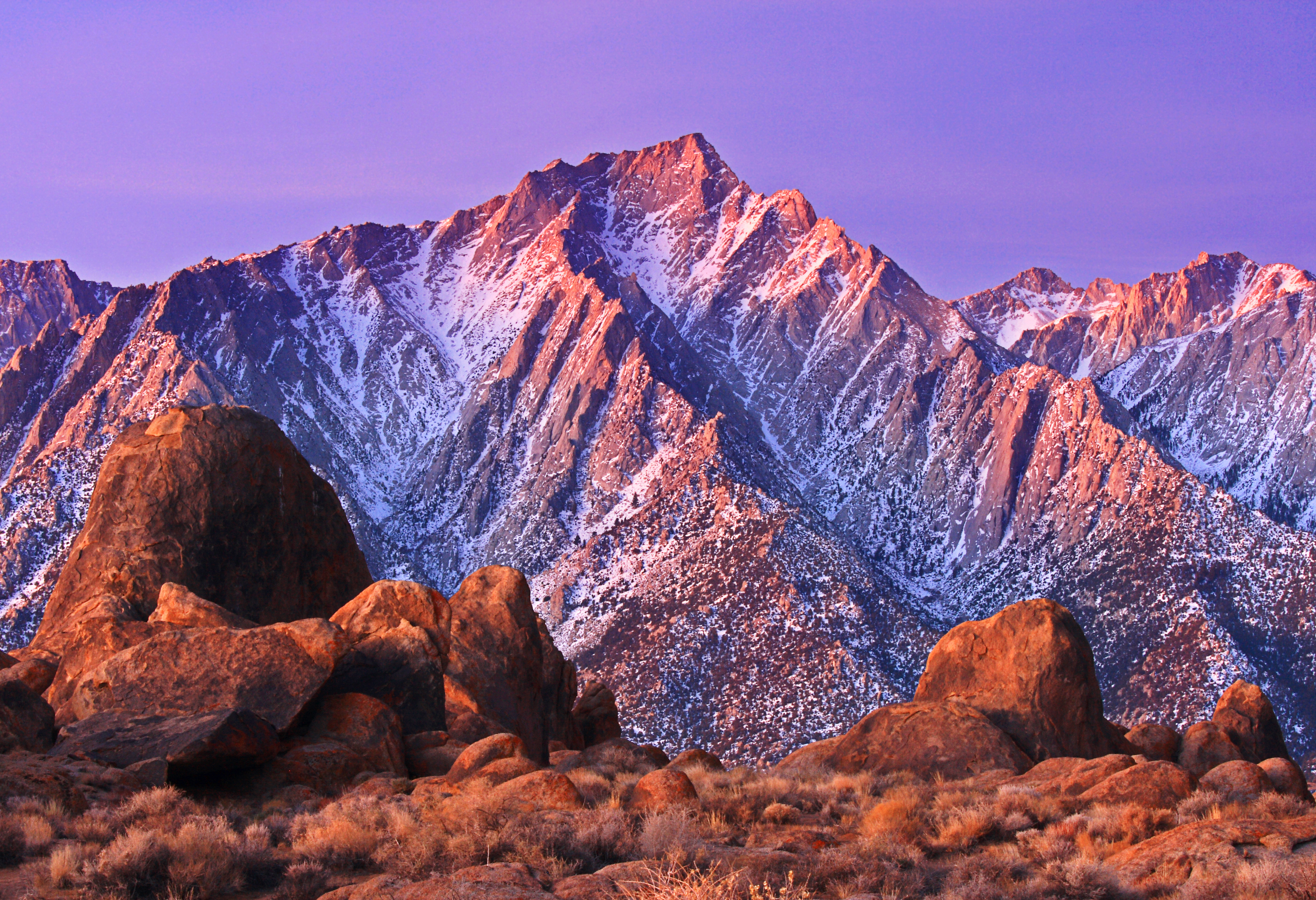
- Rocks of the Alabama Hills with the Sierra Nevada in the background, winter dawn

Highest point
- Elevation: 5,354 ft (1,632 m)

Geography
- Location within California
- Country: United States
- State: California
- County: Inyo County
- Range coordinates: 36°36′53″N 118°05′45″W
- Topo map(s): USGS Lone Pine, Union Wash

The Alabama Hills are a range of hills and rock formations near the eastern slope of the Sierra Nevada in the Owens Valley, west of Lone Pine in Inyo County, California.

Though geographically separate from the Sierra Nevada, they are part of the same geological formation.

== Alabama Hills National Scenic Area ==
Beginning on May 24, 1969, the Alabama Hills were managed by the U.S. Bureau of Land Management (BLM) as the Alabama Hills Recreation Area. In March 2019, the U.S. Congress redesignated the area as the Alabama Hills National Scenic Area.

== Camping ==
The Alabama Hills serve as a gateway to Mount Whitney and the Eastern Sierra Nevada. While dispersed camping is very popular with backpackers, car campers, and RV users, the region's fragile ecosystem and increasing numbers of visitors prompted the Bureau of Land Management to discourage the practice, appealing that camping in campgrounds helps maintain the area's great scenery and recreational opportunities.

Most of the land in the area is owned by the BLM, but some land is owned by the Los Angeles Department of Water and Power, which takes water from the region through the Los Angeles Aqueduct. The City of Los Angeles Department of Water and Power lands in the area are open for day use only.

== Geology ==
Two main types of rock are exposed at the Alabama Hills, an orange, drab weathered metamorphosed volcanic rock that is 150–200 million years old, and an 85-million-year-old biotite monzogranite which weathers to large roundish boulders, many of which stand on end due to spheroidal weathering acting on many nearly vertical joints in the rock.

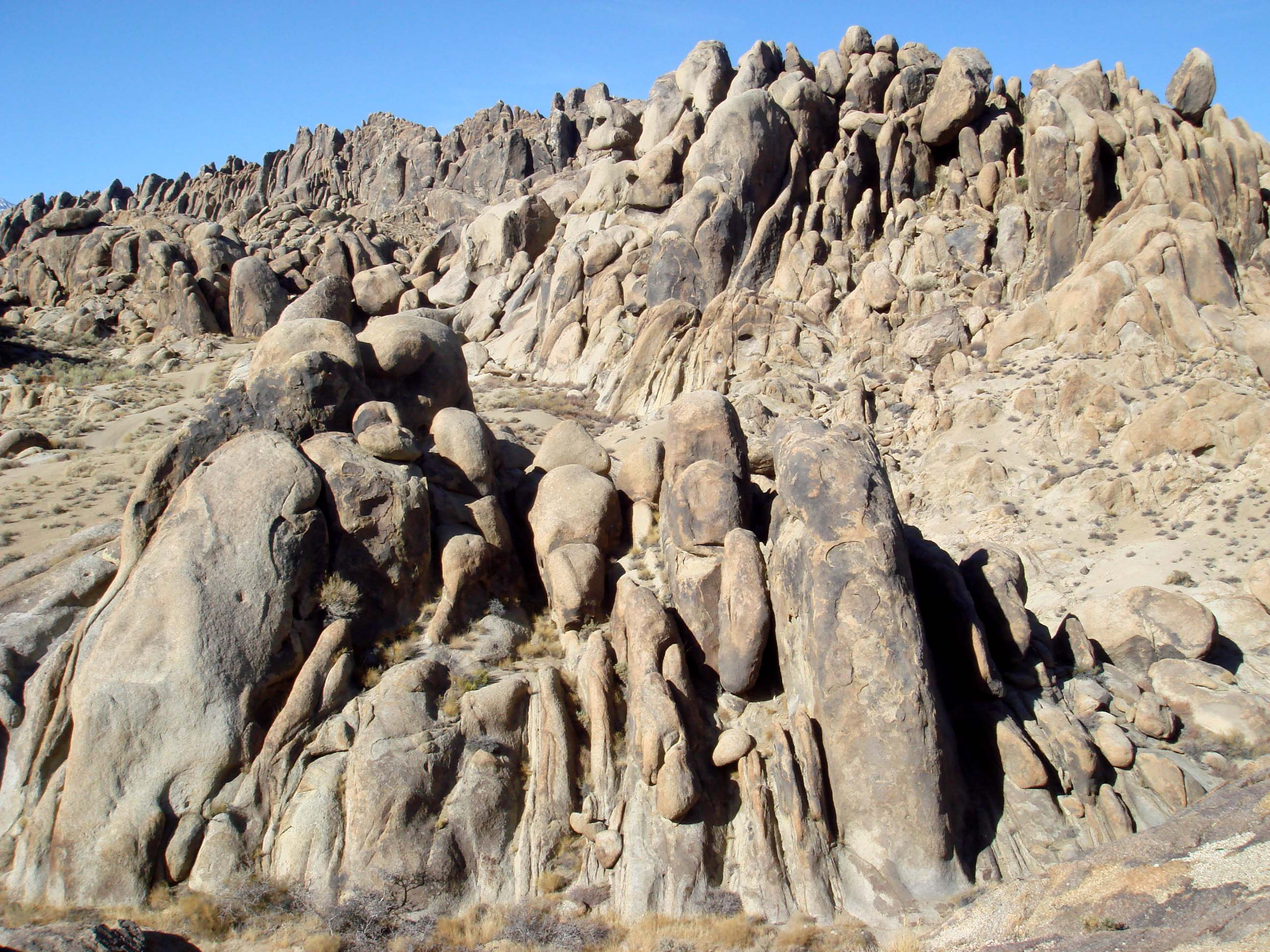
Typical rocks in Alabama Hills

The rounded contours of the Alabama Hills contrast with the sharp ridges of the Sierra Nevada to the west. Though this might suggest that they formed from a different rock, the Sierra Nevada peaks that loom above the hills are also formed from monzogranite. The difference in shape and color can be accounted for by a difference in weathering.

Mount Whitney, the tallest mountain in the contiguous United States, towers nine thousand feet above this low range, which itself is 1,500 feet (460 meters) above the floor of Owens Valley. Gravity surveys indicate that the Owens Valley is filled with about 10,000 feet (3,000 m) of sediment and that the hills are the tip of a very steep escarpment. This feature was created by the same fault system as the 1872 Lone Pine earthquake which, in a single event, caused a vertical displacement of 6 to 8 feet (1.8 to 2.4 m).

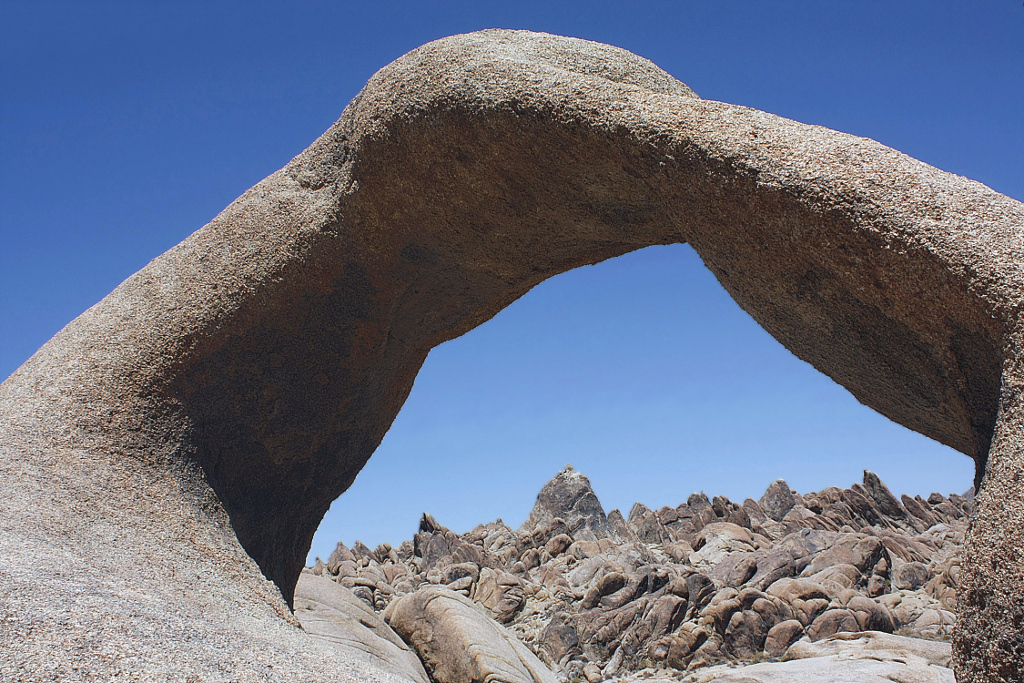
Mobius Arch

Dozens of natural arches are among the main attractions at the Alabama Hills. They can be accessed by short hikes from the Whitney Portal Road, the Movie Flat Road and the Horseshoe Meadows Road. Among the notable features of the area are: Mobius Arch, Lathe Arch, the Eye of Alabama and Whitney Portal Arch.

== History ==
The Alabama Hills were named for the CSS Alabama, a Confederate warship deployed during the American Civil War. When news of the ship's exploits reached prospectors in California sympathetic to the Confederates, they named many mining claims after the ship, and the name came to be applied to the entire range. When the Alabama was finally sunk off the coast of Normandy by the USS Kearsarge in 1864, prospectors sympathetic to the Union named a mining district, a mountain pass, a mountain peak, and a town after the Kearsarge.

== Filming location ==
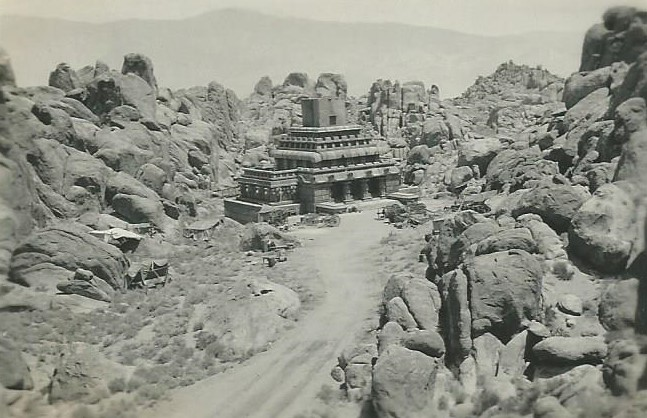
Gunga Din Temple movie set (36.5857398°N 118.1112798°W)

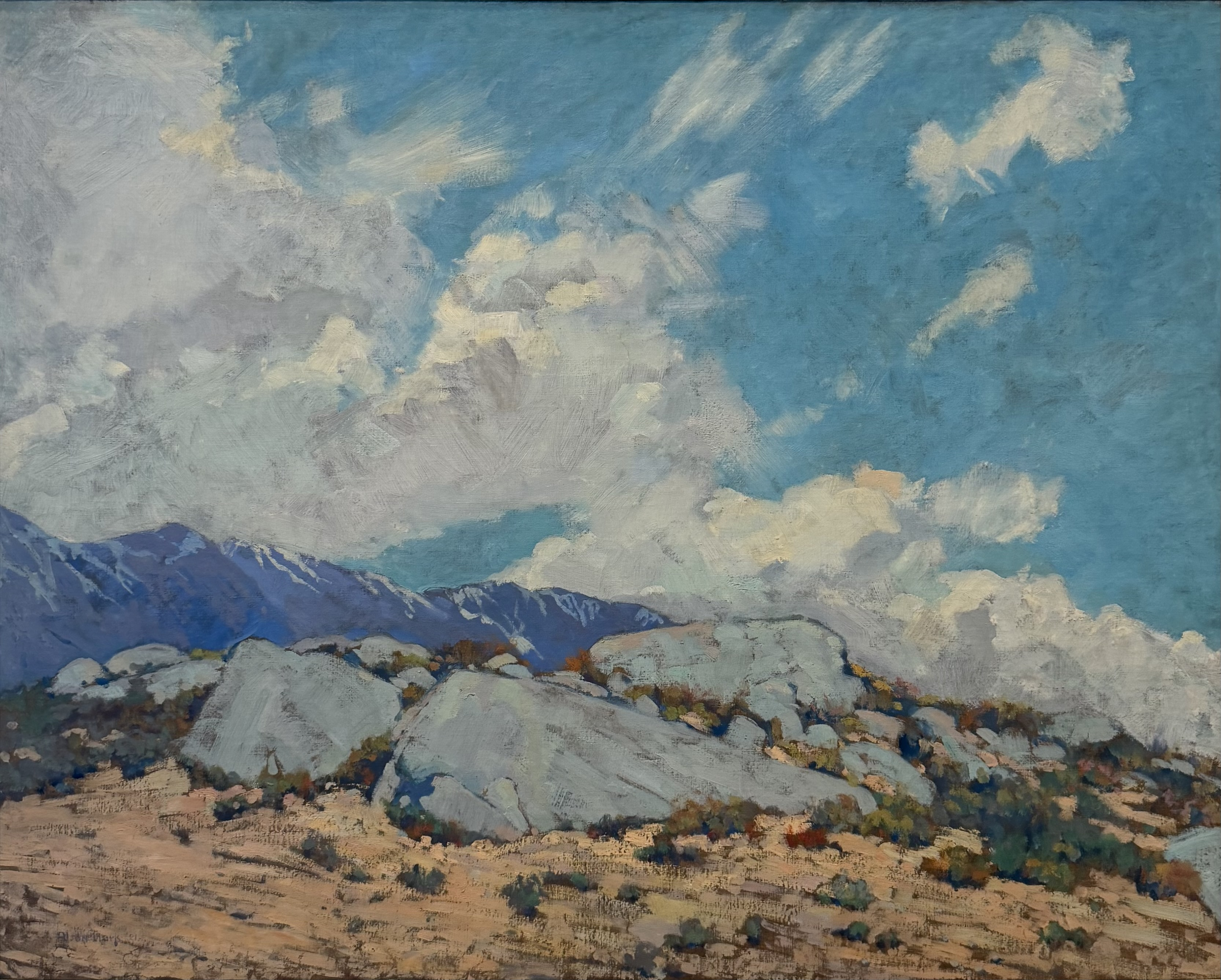
Alabama Hills painted by Alson S. Clark in 1919

The Alabama Hills are a popular filming location for television and movie productions, especially Westerns set in an archetypally rugged, isolated setting. The first known movies to be filmed there are the lost films Water, Water Everywhere and Cupid, the Cowpuncher, both shot in 1919 and released in early 1920. The oldest surviving film shot in the hills is The Round-Up (1920), starring Roscoe "Fatty" Arbuckle, which includes a cameo from his friend, Buster Keaton.

Since then, hundreds of movies have been filmed there, including: Gunga Din, The Walking Hills, Yellow Sky, Springfield Rifle, The Violent Men, Bad Day at Black Rock, the Budd Boetticher/Randolph Scott "Ranown" cycle, How the West Was Won, Joe Kidd, Saboteur, and Django Unchained, Tremors, Iron Man, and The Monolith Monsters.

Among the television shows that have been shot there are The Gene Autry Show, The Lone Ranger, Bonanza, and Annie Oakley.

In Lone Pine, the closest town to the Alabama Hills, the Lone Pine Film History Museum explores the area's relationship to the art of cinema. Exhibits include the Dr. King Schultz dentist wagon from Quentin Tarantino's Django Unchained, the 1937 Plymouth Humphrey Bogart drove in Raoul Walsh's High Sierra and a Graboid underground monster from Tremors.

Every Fall the Museum hosts the Lone Pine Film Festival, which bills itself as "the only film festival on location", because festival-goers watch films shot in the area and then take tours to see the very spots where the scenes were filmed.

== Astronomy ==
The Alabama Hills feature exceptional skies for Central California. It is Bortle class 2 or "average dark sky" site; this low level of light pollution meets or exceeds conditions in many other popular nearby areas for amateur astronomy, such as Joshua Tree National Park (Bortle class 2–4). On a clear night with no moon, a visitor with good, dark-adapted vision may see the Andromeda and Triangulum galaxies with the unaided eye; the central Milky Way appears highly structured under these conditions.
