= Mount Kearsarge =

Mount Kearsarge is the name of two different mountains in New Hampshire:

- Mount Kearsarge (Merrimack County, New Hampshire), located in Wilmot, New Hampshire, and Warner, New Hampshire
- Kearsarge North, located about 4 miles northeast of North Conway, New Hampshire

== See also ==
- Kearsarge (disambiguation)
