= Lone Pine Film Festival =

- Location: Lone Pine, California
- Founded: 1990
- Language: English
- Website: www.lonepinefilmfestival.org

The Lone Pine Film Festival is an annual film festival held in Lone Pine, California, which celebrates the hundreds of films and television episodes that used Lone Pine, the Alabama Hills, and the nearby Sierra Nevada mountain range as film locations. Since the early years of filmmaking, directors and their production units have used the Lone Pine area to represent the iconic American West. Since The Roundup (1920), the first documented film produced in the area, Lone Pine has played host to hundreds of the industry's best known directors and actors, among them directors William Wyler, John Ford, George Stevens, and William Wellman, and actors John Wayne, Gene Autry, Roy Rogers, Bing Crosby, and Barbara Stanwyck. The festival at Lone Pine was held for the first time in 1990, then called the Sierra Film Festival. In 2019, the festival celebrated its thirtieth anniversary. Held annually over the Indigenous Peoples' Day weekend, the Lone Pine Film Festival is one of the most important Western film festivals in the United States. The festival is the only film fan gathering in the world which is held on location where the movies were shot.

== History ==
The Lone Pine area was first used as a film location in 1920, when a movie production company came to the Alabama Hills to make the silent film The Round-Up. Other companies soon discovered the scenic location, and in the coming decades, over 400 films, 100 television episodes, and countless commercials used Lone Pine and the Alabama Hills as a film location. Some of the notable films shot here in the 1920s and 1930s include Riders of the Purple Sage (1925) with Tom Mix, The Enchanted Hill (1926) with Jack Holt, Somewhere in Sonora (1927) with Ken Maynard, Blue Steel (1934) with John Wayne, Hop-Along Cassidy (1935) with William Boyd, The Charge of the Light Brigade (1936) with Errol Flynn, Oh, Susanna! (1936) with Gene Autry, Rhythm on the Range (1936) with Bing Crosby, The Cowboy and the Lady (1938) with Gary Cooper, Under Western Stars (1938) with Roy Rogers, and Gunga Din (1939) with Cary Grant.

In the coming decades, Lone Pine and the Alabama Hills continued to be used as the setting for Western films, including West of the Pecos (1945) with Robert Mitchum, Thunder Mountain (1947) with Tim Holt, The Gunfighter (1950) with Gregory Peck, The Nevadan (1950) with Randolph Scott, Bad Day at Black Rock (1955) with Spencer Tracy, Hell Bent for Leather (1960) with Audie Murphy, How the West Was Won (1962) with James Stewart, Nevada Smith (1966) with Steve McQueen, Joe Kidd (1972) with Clint Eastwood, Maverick (1994) with Mel Gibson, and The Lone Ranger (2013) with Johnny Depp. Through the years, non-Western films also used the unique landscape of the area, including Alfred Hitchcock's Saboteur (1942) with Robert Cummings, Samson and Delilah (1949) with Hedy Lamarr, Star Trek V: The Final Frontier (1989) with William Shatner, Tremors (1990) with Kevin Bacon, The Postman (1997) with Kevin Costner, and Gladiator (2000) with Russell Crowe.

In 1989, Lone Pine business and community leaders developed a plan to celebrate the film industry's heritage of using Lone Pine and the surrounding area as film locations to represent the iconic American West. They invited numerous actors, directors, and producers who made films in the area throughout the years. The first film festival in Lone Pine was held on October 6 and 7 and was called the Sierra Film Festival. Co-sponsored by a number of individuals and businesses, that first festival included numerous Western film celebrities, including Roy Rogers, Richard Farnsworth, Rand Brooks, Pierce Lyden, Loren Janes, William Witney, and former stuntman Joe Yrigoyen. The festival acknowledging its "deep appreciation and great gratitude" to Roy Rogers, who made his first film in Lone Pine in 1938 with Under Western Stars. Rogers dedicated an historical stone marker placed at Whitney Portal and Movie Road during the festival. The bronze plaque on the stone reads: "Sierra Film Festival, 70 years of Movie History, October 6 & 7, 1990, Movie Flats – Lone Pine".

== Events ==
The Lone Pine Film Festival takes place annually over the Columbus Day weekend, the second weekend of October. The festival opens at the Lone Pine Film History Museum on Thursday night for a gala reception. Over the next three days, a variety of events take place, including:

- Guided tours into the Alabama Hills to notable film locations (by car caravan)
- Film screenings
- Guest speakers and panels
- Sunrise photo tours and cowboy poetry
- Wild West shows
- Rodeo shows
- Sunday afternoon parade of celebrities
- Sunday night closing campfire

== Festivals ==
Year	Title	Special Guests
1990	Sierra Film Festival	Rand Brooks, Irene Cuffe, Eddie Dean, Richard Farnsworth, Linda Hayes, Loren Janes, Pierce Lyden, Roy Rogers, Jack Williams, William Witney, Joe Yrigoyen
1991	Sierra Film Festival Tribute to Hopalong Cassidy	Mrs. William Boyd, Grace Boyd, Rand Brooks, Iron Eyes Cody, John Hart, Loren Janes, Pierce Lyden, Virginia Mayo, Montie Montana, George Montgomery, Peggy Stewart, William Whitney
1992	Sierra Film Festival	John Agar, Rex Allan, William Benedict, Rand Brooks, Douglas Fairbanks, Jr., Richard Famsworth, Jennifer Holt, Loren Janes, Pierce Lyden, Richard Martin, Clayton Moore, Ann Rutherford, Henry Wills, William Witney
1993	A Tribute to John Wayne	John Agar, Harry Carey, Jr., Ben Johnson, Pat Buttram, Dick Jones (actor), Pierce Lyden, Loren Janes, Jan Merlin, Montie Montana, Peggy Stewart
1994	50th Anniversary of Robert Michum's First Starring Picture	Kay Aldridge, Charles Champlin, John Ericson, Barbara Hale, Loren Janes, Pierce Lyden, Anne Michum, John Michum, Ruth Terry, William Witney
1995	A Salute to America's Favorite Cowboy	Ernest Borgnine, Frank Coughlin, John Hart, Robert Horton, Will Hutchins, Loren Janes, Karl Malden, John Michum, Denny Miller, Don Murray, Peggy Stewart
1996	Movies Shot in Lone Pine	Hugn O’Brian, Rob Ward, Robert Horton, Terry Moore, Burt Kennedy, Pierce Lyden, John Michum, Peggy Stewart, Loren Janes, Dick Jones
1997	Salute to Republic Pictures	Vera Ralston, Rand Brooks, Peggy Stewart, Robert W. Sigman, John Michum, Ann Rutherford, Penny Edwards, Ruth Terry, Pierce Lyden, Loren Janes, Kay Aldridge, Allan Lane
1998	Salute to William A. Wellman	Adrian Booth Brian, Ben Burtt, Dale Evens, Loren Janes, Burt Kennedy, John Michum, Peggy Stewart, Ruth Terry, Claire Trevor, William Wellman Jr.
1999	Tenth Anniversary of the Film Festival	Robert Blake, Budd Boetticher, Ernest Borgnine, Ben Burtt, Angie Dickinson, Dale Evans, Kathryn Grayson, Barbra Hale, Burt Kennedy, Celeste Holm, Joan Leslie, A. C. Lyles, John Michum, Jack Palance, Peggy Stewart, Ruth Terry
2000	Lone Pine Film Festival	Budd Boettcher, Adrian Booth Brian, Ben Burtt, Ben Cooper, Fred Dryer, Loren Janes, Burt Kennedy, John Michum, Terry Moore, Jack Palance, Dale Robertson, Ann Rutherford, Peggy Stewart, Ruth Terry
2001	Lone Pine Film Festival	A. C. Lyles, John Michum, Peggy Stewart, Ruth Terry, William Wellman Jr., Roydon Clark, Diamond Farnsworth, Loren Janes, Neil Summers, Jack Williams
2002	Lone Pine Film Festival	Dean Stockwell, Neil Summers, Ruth Terry, William Wellman Jr., Michel Gross, Ron Underwood, Marsha Hunt, Brent Mattock, Nancy Roberts, Craig Barron, S. S. Wilson
2003	Women of the Westerns	Peter Brown, Ben Cooper, Michael Dante, Anne Francis, Ty Hardin, Robert Horton, Anne Jeffreys, Steve Mitchell, Loren Janes, Howard Keel, Terry Moore, Margaret O'Brian, Ann Rutherford, Peggy Stewart, William Smith, Ruth Terry, Clint Walker, Sue Ane Langdon, John Saxton, Kelo Henderson, Rex Allan Jr., Cheryl Rodgers Barnett, Terrie Davis, Diamond Farnsworth, Chris Mitchum, Cindy Mitchum
2004	Back to the Classics	Cheryl Rodgers Barnett, Peter Brown, Roydon Clark, Ben Cooper, Kim Darby, Michael Emerson, Diamond Farnsworth, Edward Faulkner, Loren Janes, Anne Francis, Robert Hoy, Anne Jefferys, Rob Roy Johnson, Jamie Nudie, Anne Lockhart, Dick Jones, Neil Summers, Don Stroud, A. C. Lyles, Wyatt Mccrea, Paul Picerni, Jennifer Rodgers, Kevin McCarthy, Denny Miller, Anne Rutherford, Peggy Stewart, Joe Spencer Tracy, Kiki Ebsen, Jack Williams, William Wellman Jr.
2005	Cowboy Heroes and Their Horses	Richard Anderson, Cheryl Rodgers Barnett, Cliff Emmrich, Diamond Farnsworth, Marie Harmon, Lois Hall, Whiney Hughes, Loren Janes, George Keymas, A. C. Lyles, Petrine Mitchum, Donna Martell, Noel Neil, Andrew Prine, Paul Picerni, Ann Rutherford, Dana Wynter, John Saxton, William Wellman Jr., Peggy Stewart, Neil Summers, Morgan Woodward
2006	Return of the Badmen	Diamond Farnsworth, Ben Murphy, Cheryl Rodgers Barnett, Ed Faulkner, Colleen Gray, Teddy Infuhr, Henry Silva, Loren Janes, Dick Jones, Donna Martell, William Wellman Jr., Jan Merlin, Robert Easton, Peggy Stewart, Dave Stamey, Ian Tyson
2007	Singing Cowboys	Loren Janes, Wyatt McCrea, Ben Murphy, Gregg Palmer, Tom Reese, Elaine Riley, Peggy Stewart, William Wellman, Chuck Street
2008	Lone Pine Film Festival	Richard Anderson, Michael Chapin, Phyllis Coats, Richard Devon, Diamond Farnsworth, Robert Horton, Loren Janes, Geoffrey Lewis, John Locke, Denny Miller, Jacqueline Scott, Warren Stevens, Peggy Stewart, Beverly Washburn, Audrey Dalton, Jamie Lee Nudie
2009	Film Festival	Stella Stevens, Andrew Prine, Hugh O'Brian, Ben Cooper, Denny Miller, Dick Jones, Ernest Borgnine, William Wellman Jr., Peggy Stewart, Geri Jewell, Perry King, Loren Janes, Diamond Farnsworth, Dean Smith
2010	75th Anniversary of Republic Films Trail to Lone Pine	Cheryl Rodgers Barnett, Bruce Boxleitner, Robert Dix, Don Edwards, Diamond Farnsworth, Lee Horsley, Loren Janes, Donna Martell, Hugh O'Brian, Paul Picerini, Ty Power, Andrew Prine, Sourdough Slim, Packy Smith, William Smith, Peggy Stewart, Buck Taylor
2011	Lights Camera Action	Andrew Robinson, Dean Smith, Diamond Farnsworth, Ed Faulkner, Loren Janes, Marie Harmon, Peggy Stewart, Peter Ford, Wyatt McCrea
2012	100 Years Celebrate the Centennials	Ed Faulkner, Diamond Farnsworth, Johnny Crawford, Loren Janes, Larry Maurice, Peggy Stewart, Robert Crawford Jr., Stanley Livingston
2013	Where the Real West Becomes the Reel West	Leonard Maltin, Andrew Prine, David Rothel, Mariette Hartley, L. Q. Jones, Clu Gulager, Dan Hornak, Wyatt McCrea, Larry Maurice, Peggy Stewart, Loren Janes, Diamond Farnsworth
2014	The Silver Anniversary Celebration	Bruce Boxleitner, Dean Smith, Johnny Crawford, David Rothel, Miles Swarthout, Steven Wystrach, William Wellman Jr., Jay Dee Witney, Diamond Farnsworth, Ed Faulkner, Donna Martell, Larry Maurice, Dawn Moore, Cheryl Rogers Barnett, Peggy Stewart, Loren Janes, Wyatt McCrea
2015	Celebrating the Early Years	Bob Boze Bell, Don Edwards, Diamond Farnsworth, Larry Maurice, Petrine Day Mitchum, Wyatt McCrea, Cheryl Rogers, Peggy Stewart, Gary Brown, Larry Floyd, Bob White

== See also ==
- Alabama Hills
- List of films shot in Lone Pine
