= Kearsarge Pinnacles =

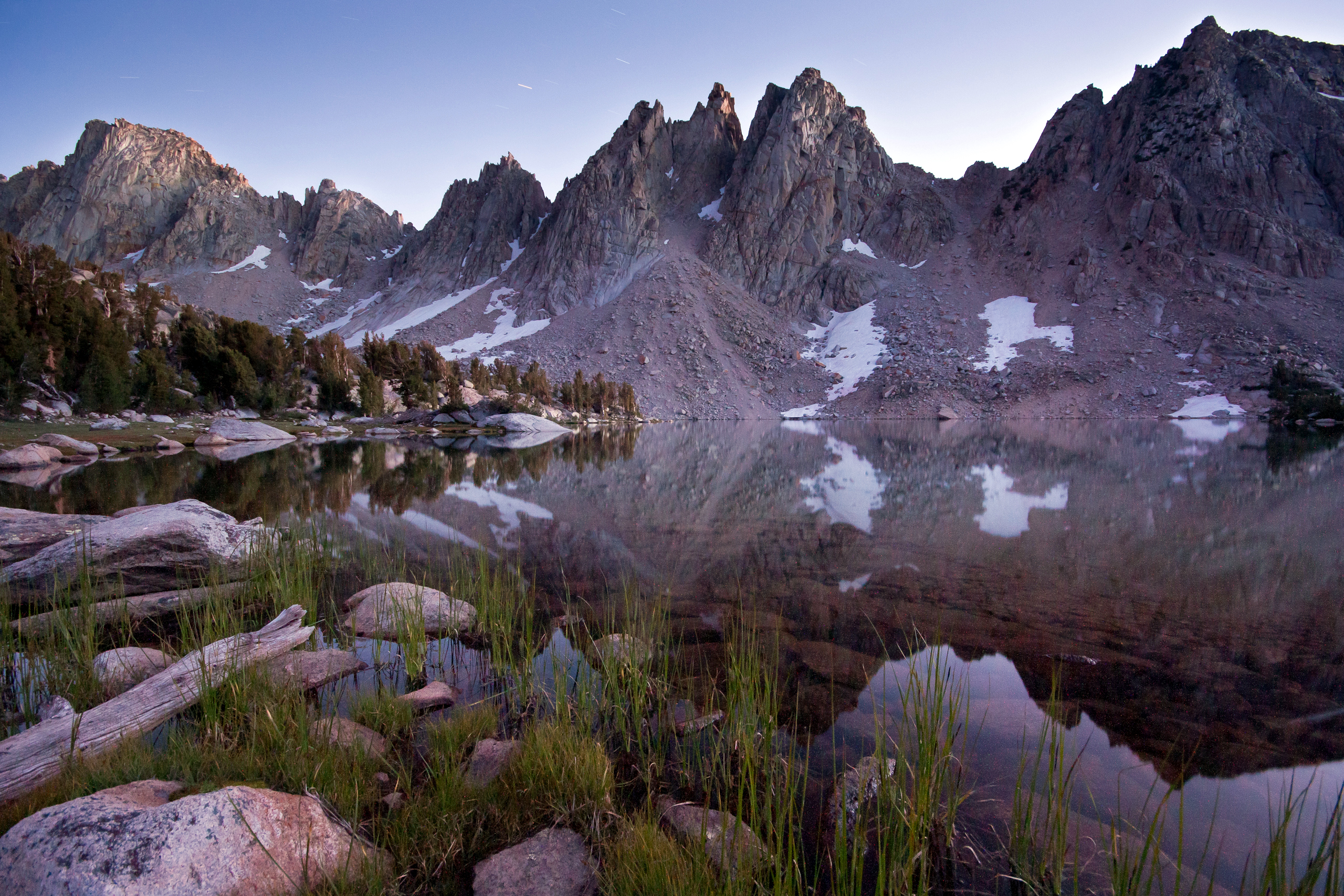
- Northeast aspect, from Kearsarge Lakes

Highest point
- Elevation: 12,008 ft (3,660 m)
- Prominence: 131 ft (40 m)
- Parent peak: University Peak (13,589 ft)
- Isolation: 0.65 mi (1.05 km)
- Coordinates: 36°45′29″N 118°23′15″W

Geography
- Location within California Location within the United States
- Location: Kings Canyon National Park; Fresno County; California, U.S.
- Parent range: Sierra Nevada
- Topo map: USGS Mount Clarence King

Geology
- Rock type: granitic

Climbing
- Easiest route: class 3 to 5

Kearsarge Pinnacles is a linear series of 12 pillars and crags on a northwest–southeast trending ridge located one mile west of the crest of the Sierra Nevada mountain range, in the southeast corner of Fresno County, in northern California. It is situated in Kings Canyon National Park, 11 miles (18 km) west-southwest of the community of Independence, immediately southwest of the Kearsarge Lakes and Kearsarge Pass, and northwest of parent University Peak. The highest, number 4, rises to 12,008 feet in elevation (3,660 meters), whereas number 8 is the most prominent. Topographic relief is significant as the west aspect rises 2,500 feet (760 meters) above Vidette Meadow in one-half mile. The John Muir Trail traverses below the west aspect of this remote geographical feature. The Kearsarge pinnacles, lakes, peak, and pass were named after the Kearsarge mine to the east, which was named by its owners after the USS Kearsarge. In turn, the ship was named after Mount Kearsarge in New Hampshire.

== Climate ==
According to the Köppen climate classification system, the Kearsarge Pinnacles are located in an alpine climate zone. Most weather fronts originate in the Pacific Ocean, and travel east toward the Sierra Nevada mountains. As fronts approach, they are forced upward by the peaks, causing them to drop their moisture in the form of rain or snowfall onto the range (orographic lift). Precipitation runoff from the ridge drains into tributaries of Bubbs Creek, which in turn is a tributary of the South Fork Kings River.

== Gallery ==
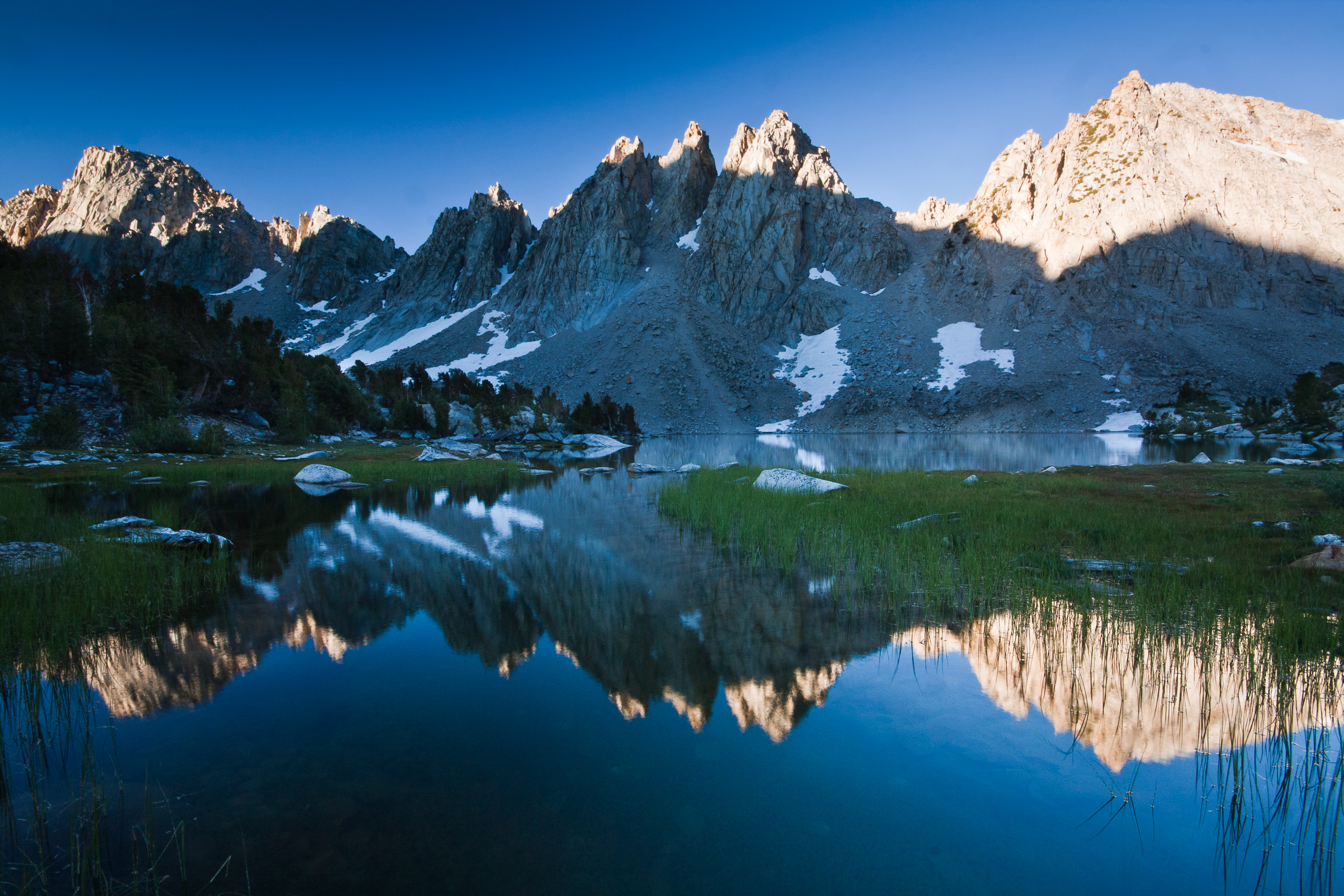
Numbers 4 (left) through 10 (right) at sunrise

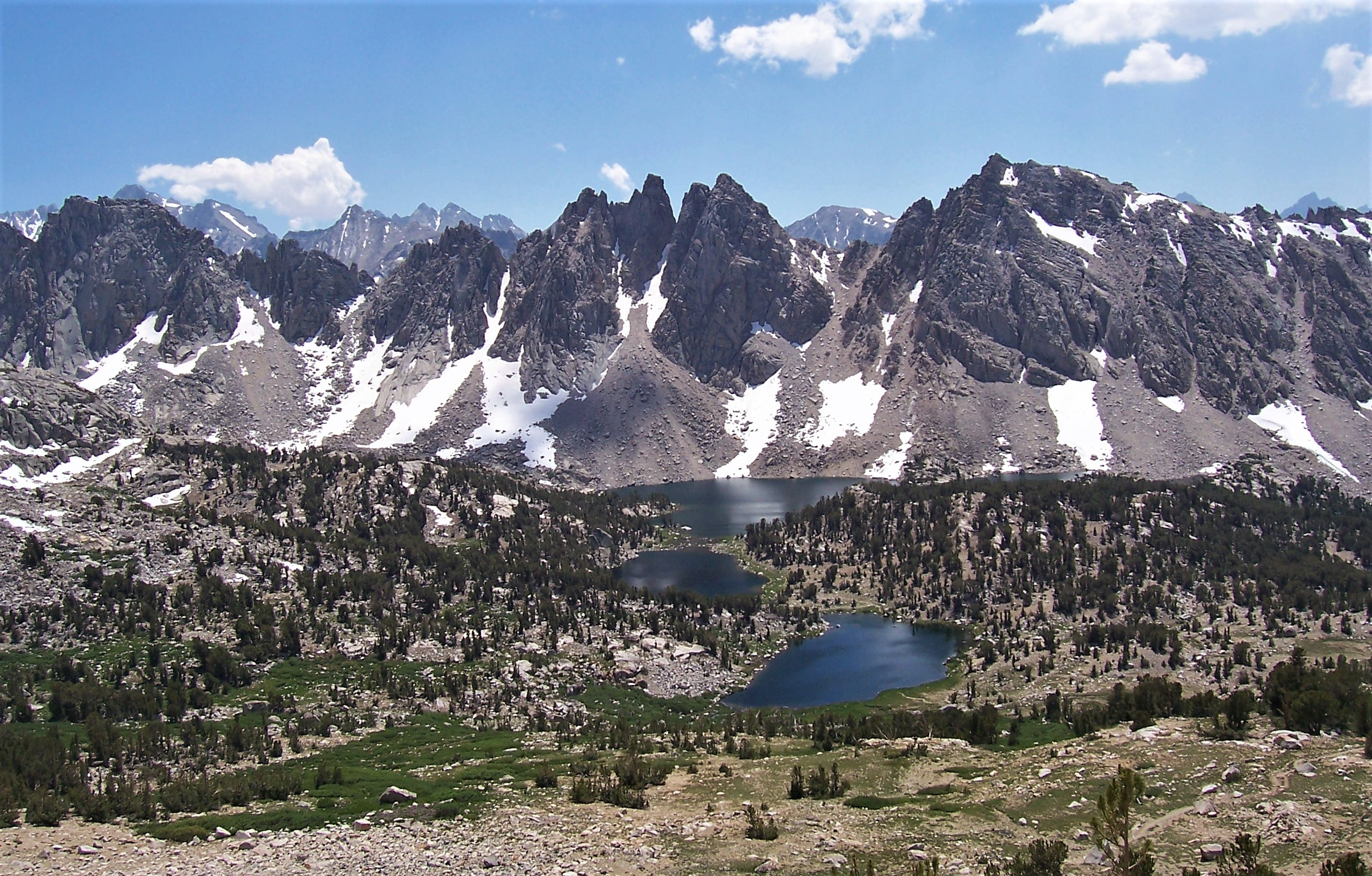
from near Kearsarge Pass

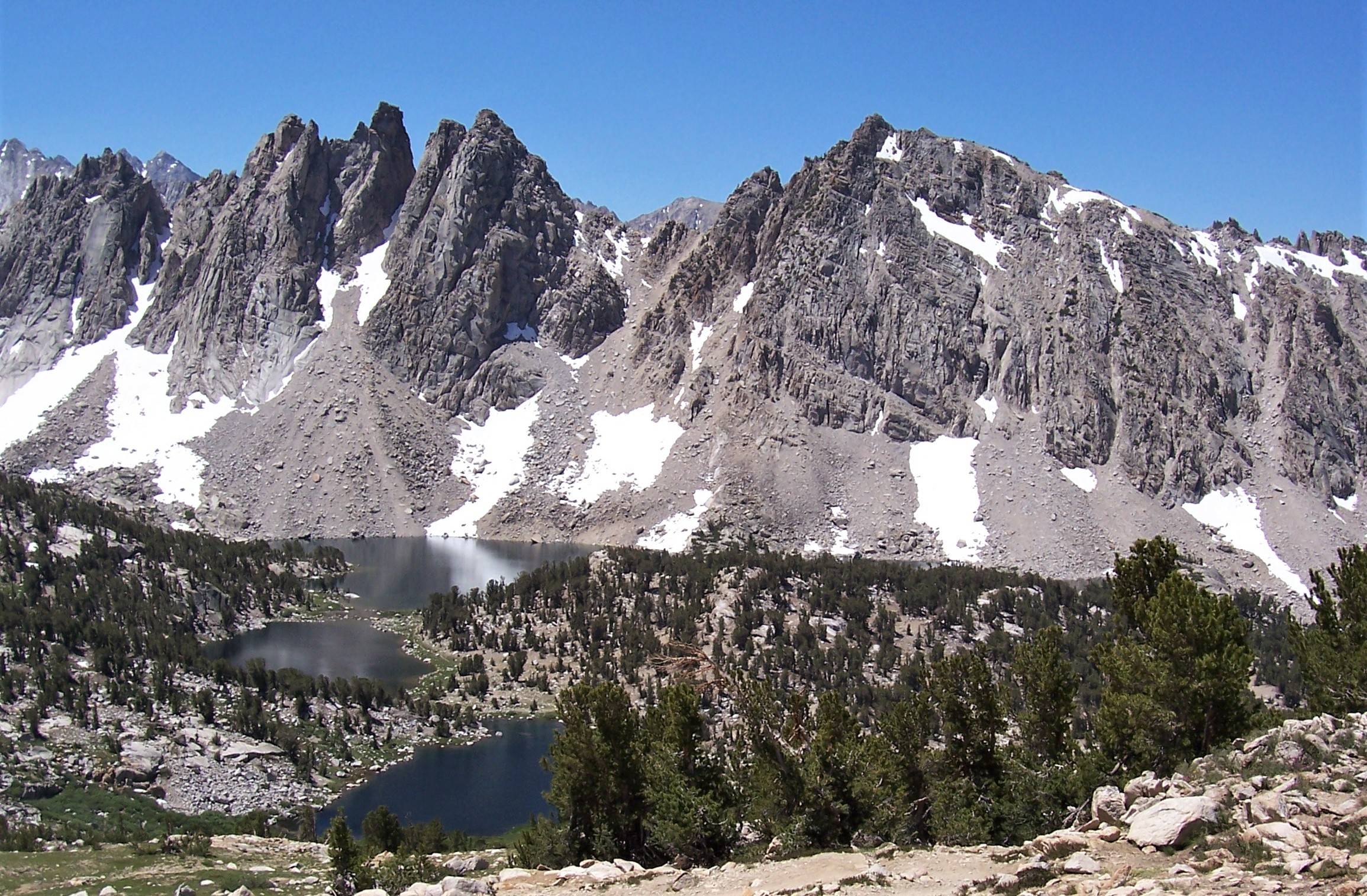
6, 7, 8, 9, and 10

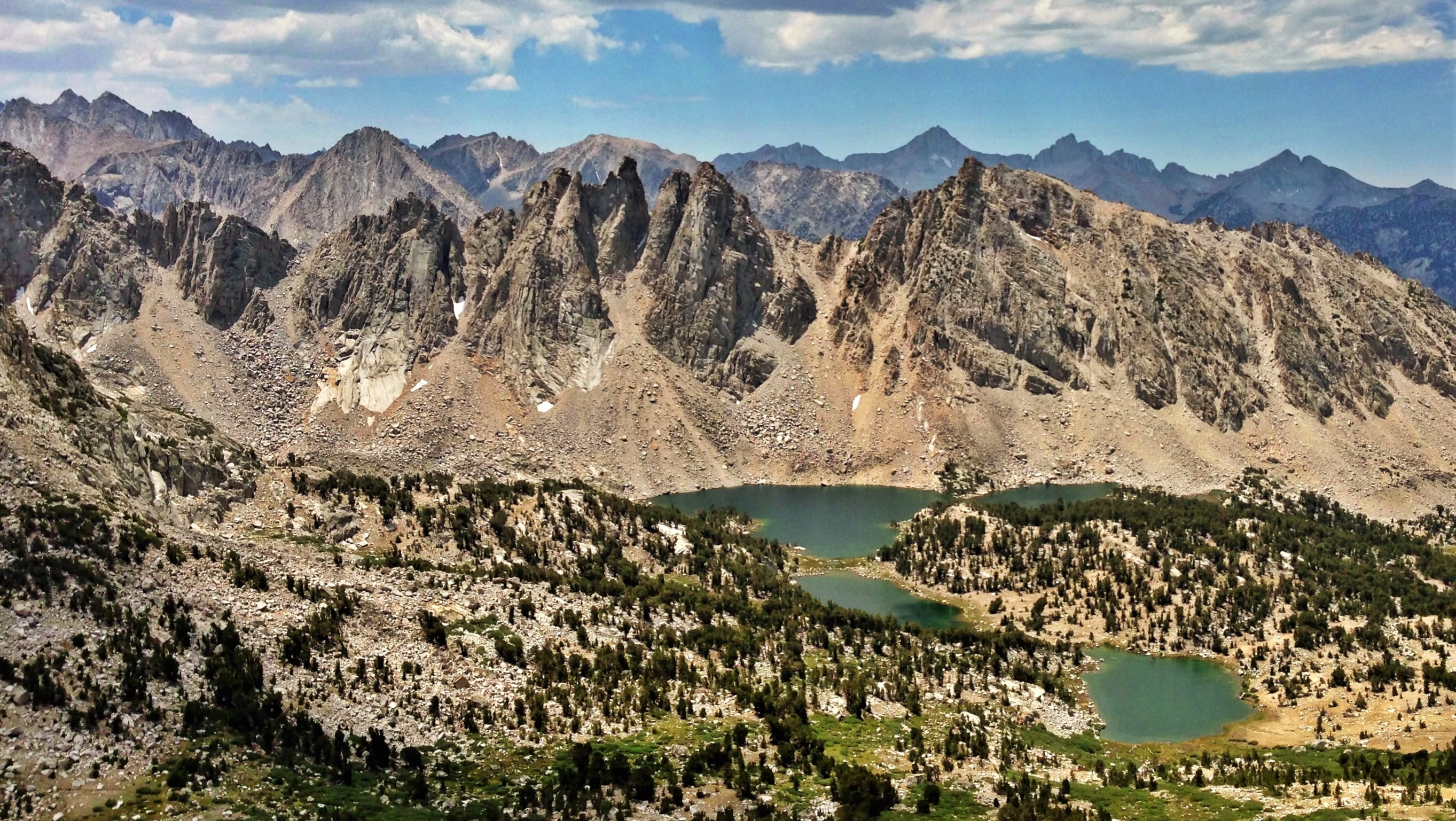
Kearsarge Lakes and Pinnacles from Kearsarge Pass

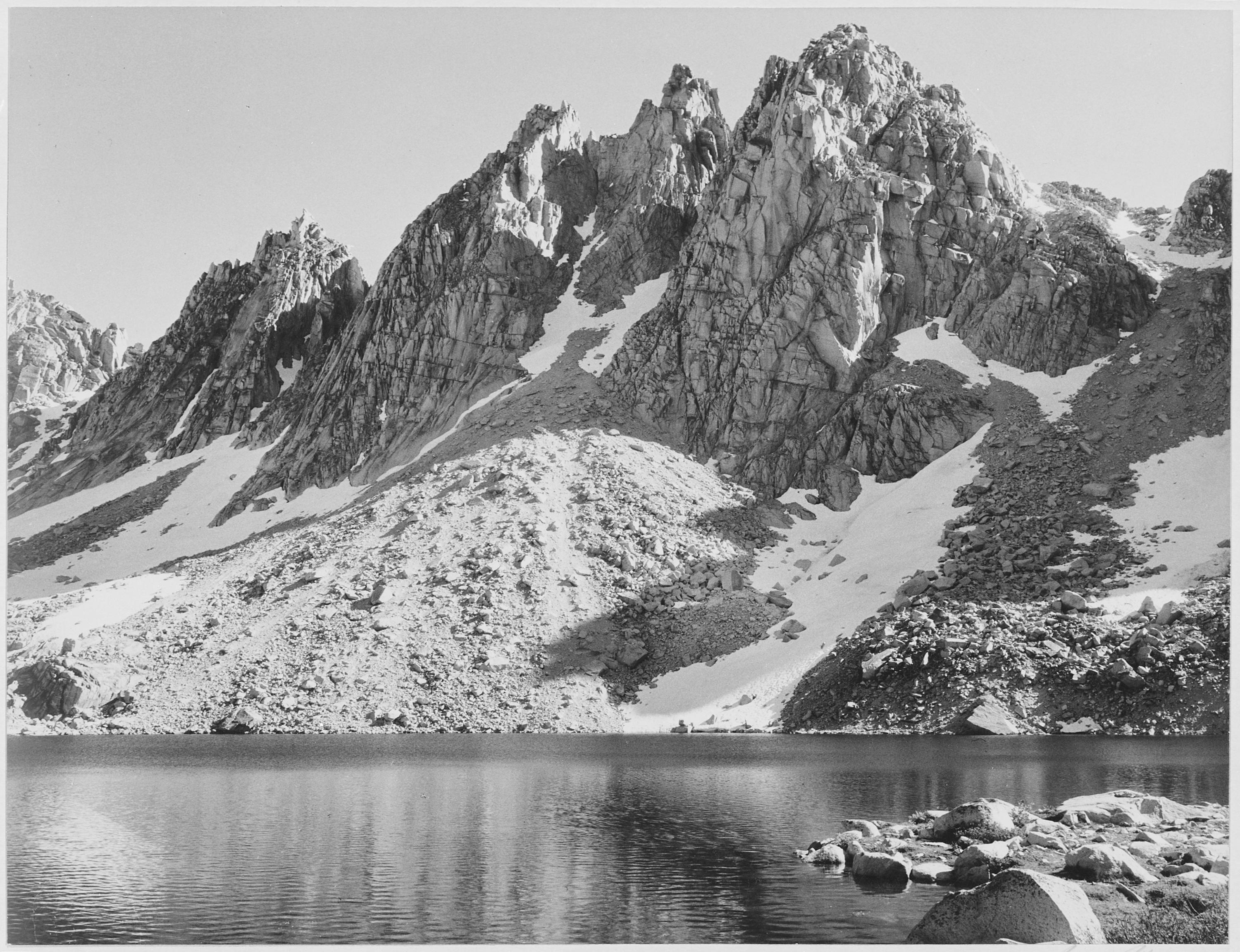
Kearsarge Pinnacles by Ansel Adams ca. 1941

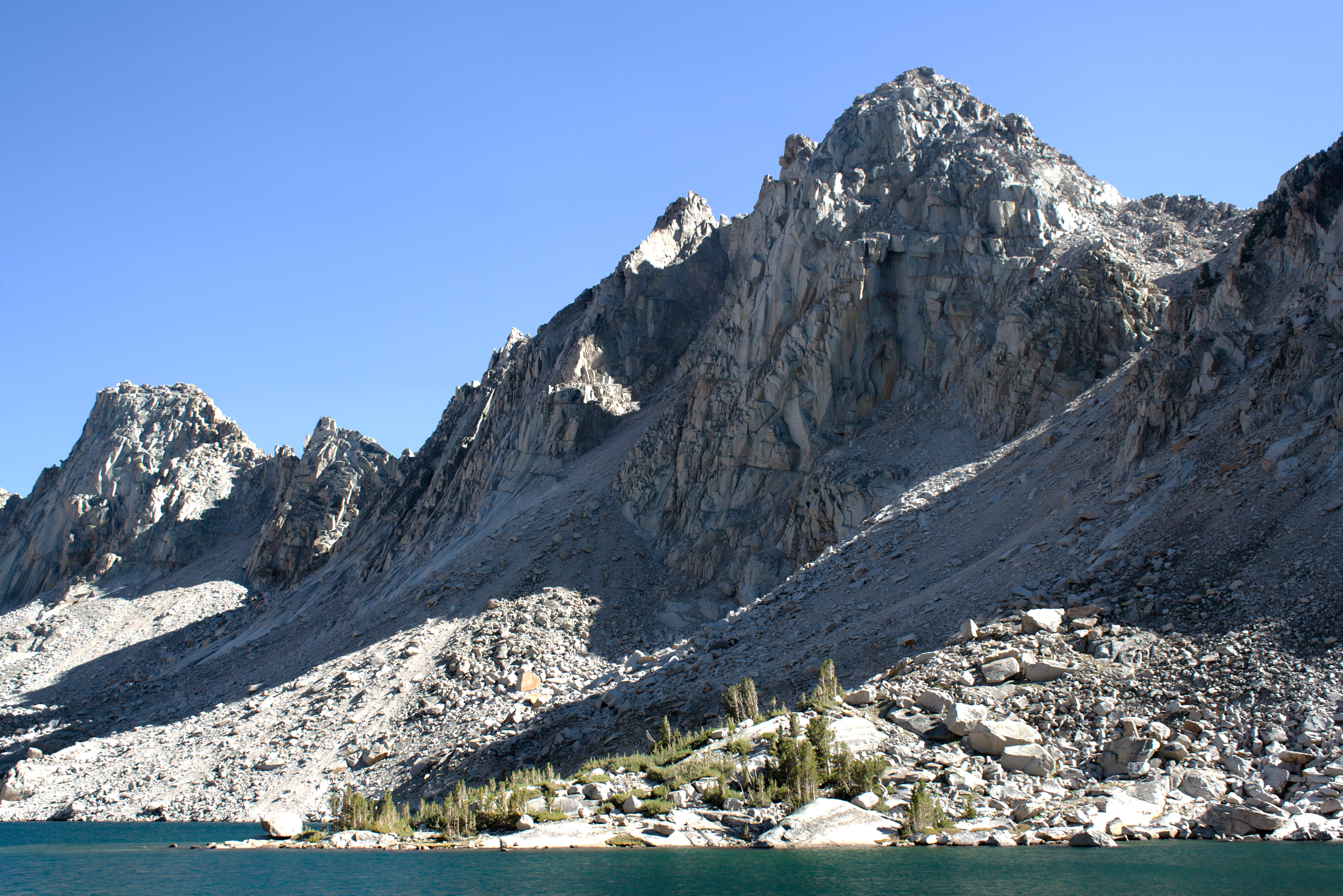

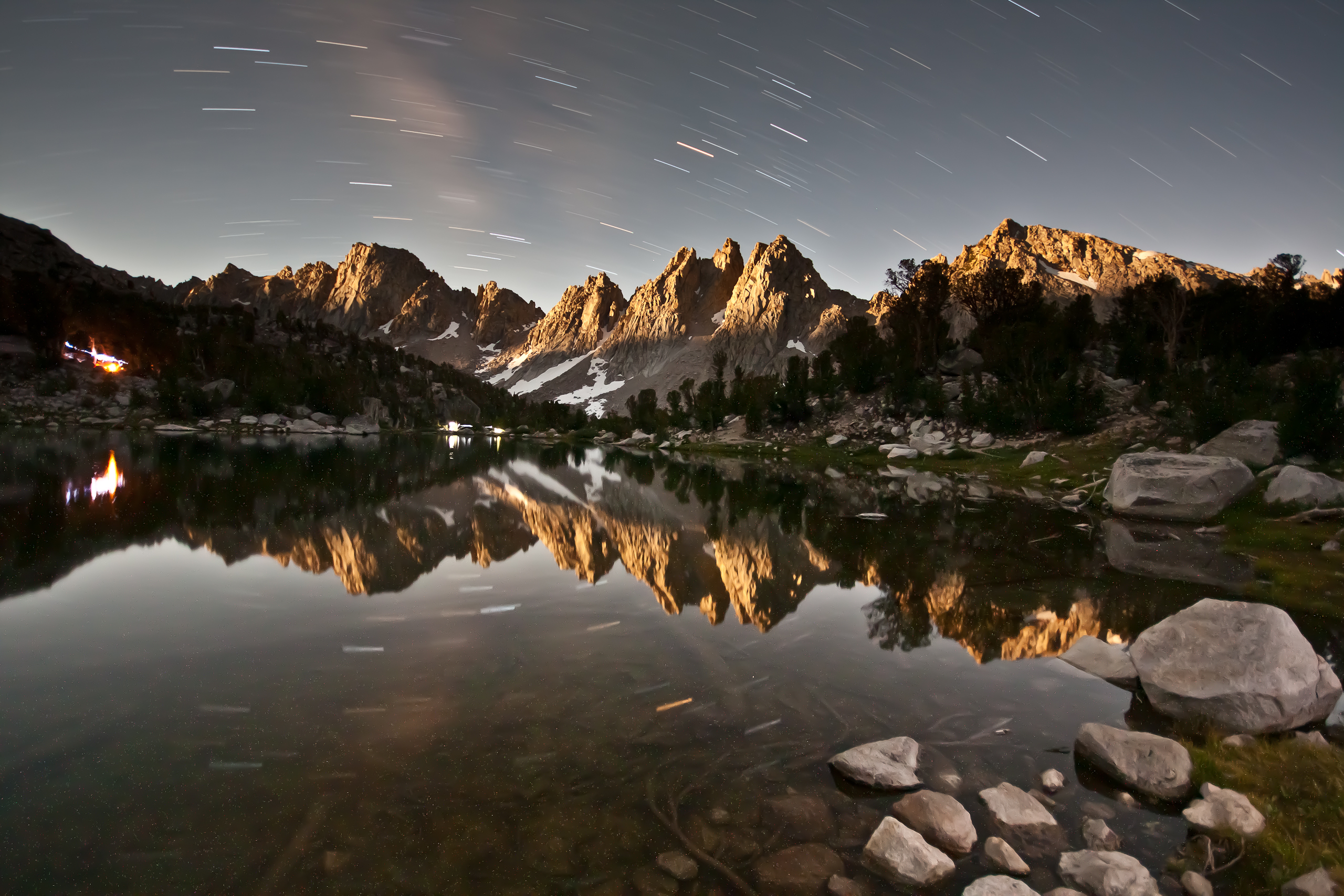
by moonlight

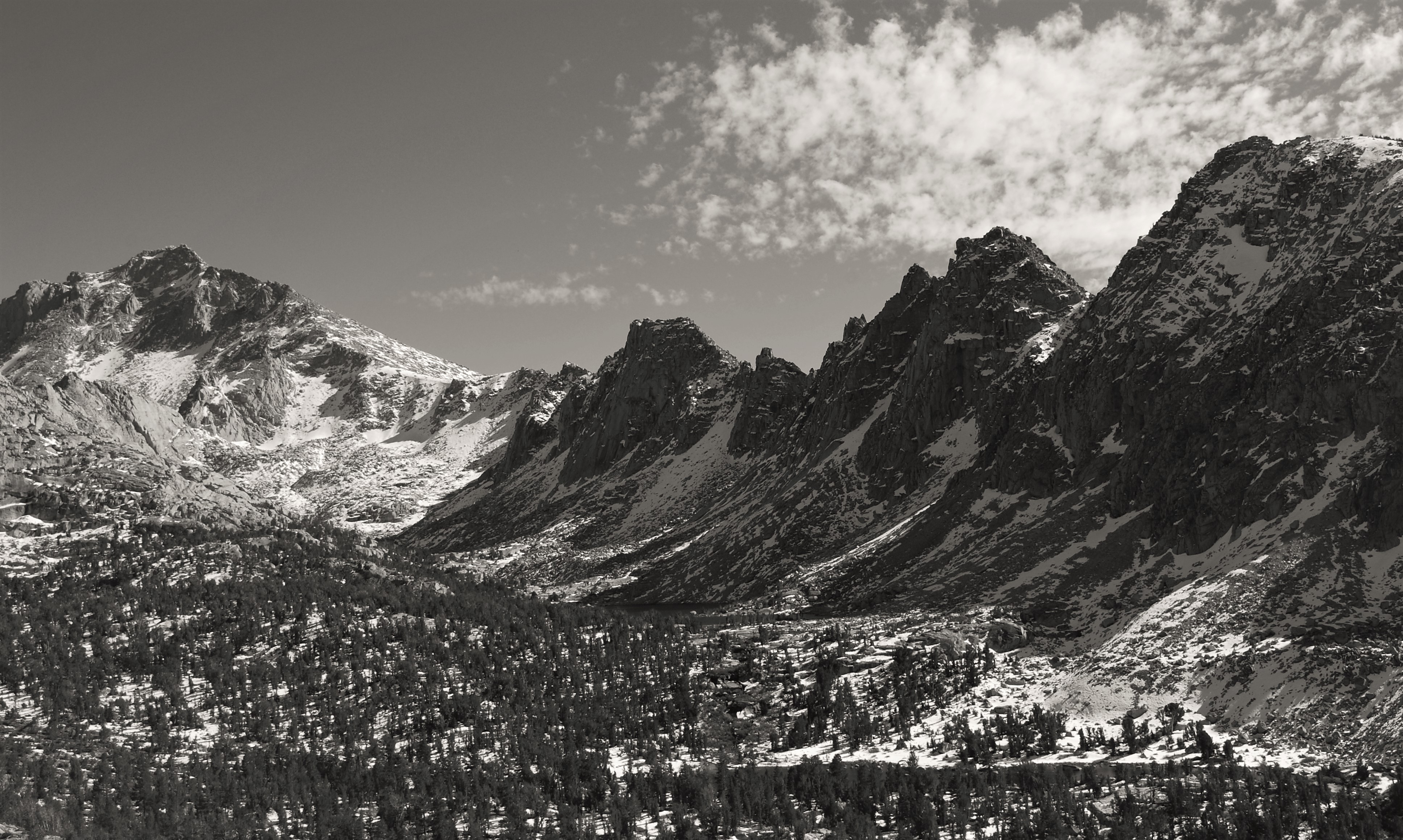
Kearsarge Pinnacles with University Peak (left)

== See also ==
- East Vidette
- List of mountain peaks of California
