= Independence Peak (California) =

Mountain in the American state of California

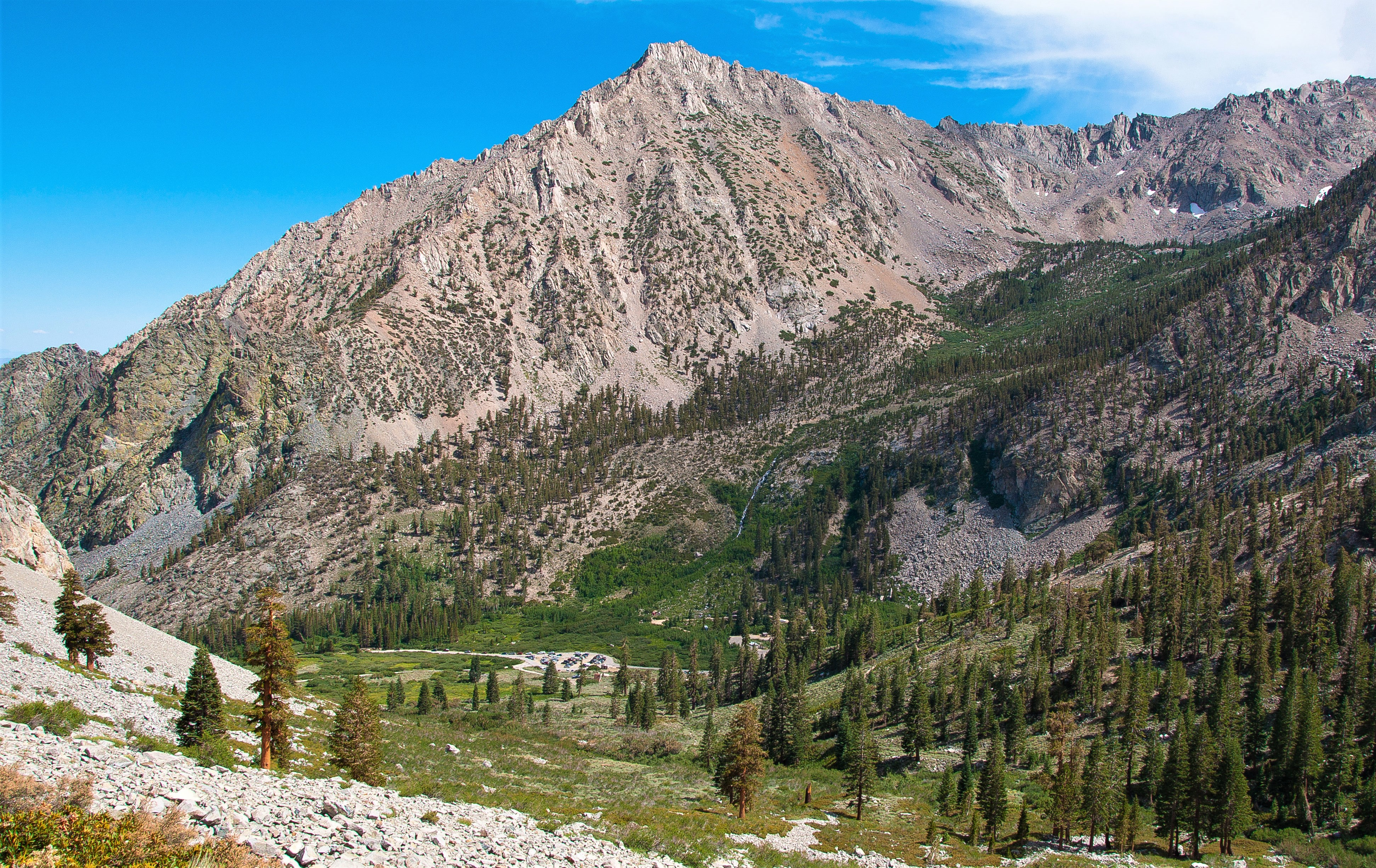
- Northwest aspect

Highest point
- Elevation: 11,742 ft (3,579 m) NAVD 88
- Prominence: 358 ft (109 m)
- Parent peak: University Peak
- Isolation: 1.89 mi (3.04 km)
- Listing: Sierra Peaks Section
- Coordinates: 36°45′39″N 118°19′55″W

Geography
- Location within California Location within the United States
- Country: United States
- State: California
- County: Inyo
- Protected area: John Muir Wilderness
- Parent range: Sierra Nevada
- Topo map: USGS Kearsarge Peak

Geology
- Rock age: Cretaceous
- Mountain type: Fault block

Climbing
- First ascent: January 17, 1926 by Norman Clyde
- Easiest route: Exposed scramble, class 3

Independence Peak is an 11,742-foot-elevation (3,579-meter) mountain summit located one mile east of the crest of the Sierra Nevada mountain range, in Inyo County of northern California. It is situated immediately south of Onion Valley on the eastern boundary of John Muir Wilderness, on land managed by Inyo National Forest. It is also 8 miles (13 km) west-southwest of the community of Independence, and 1.9 miles (3.1 km) northeast of parent University Peak. Topographic relief is significant as the north aspect rises 3,600 feet (1,100 meters) above Onion Valley in one mile. Independence Peak can be climbed via the north slope from Onion Valley. The first ascent of the summit was made in 1926 by Norman Clyde, who is credited with 130 first ascents, most of which were in the Sierra Nevada. He climbed this peak three times in 1926, and twice in 1927. He was principal of the high school in Independence from 1924 to 1928, which provided him access to this nearest peak to his home.

== Climate ==
According to the Köppen climate classification system, Independence Peak has an alpine climate. Most weather fronts originate in the Pacific Ocean, and travel east toward the Sierra Nevada mountains. As fronts approach, they are forced upward by the peaks, causing them to drop their moisture in the form of rain or snowfall onto the range (orographic lift). Precipitation runoff from this mountain drains north into Independence Creek, thence Owens Valley.

== Gallery ==
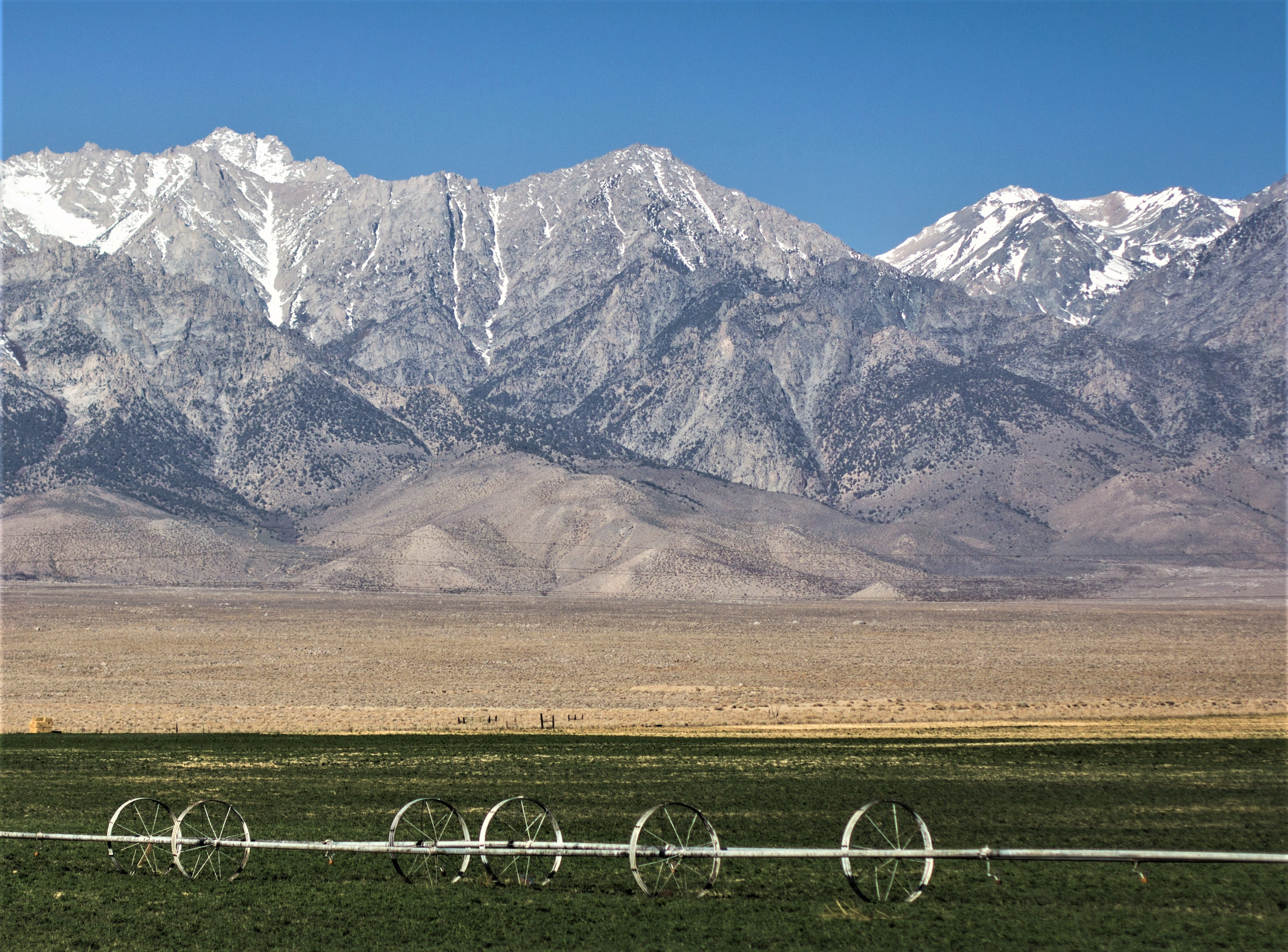
Independence Peak (east aspect, centered) from Owens Valley

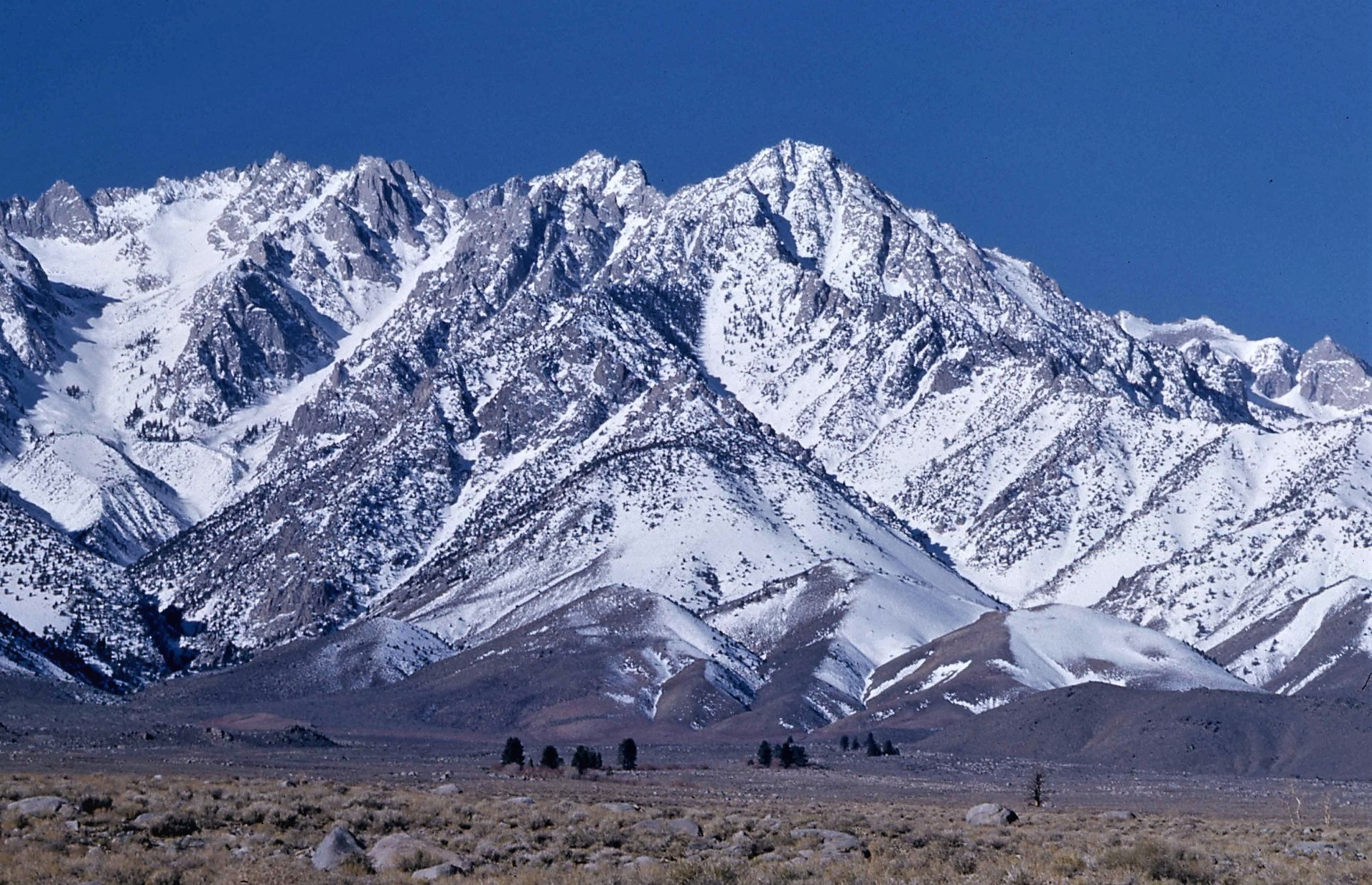
Independence Peak from Owens Valley

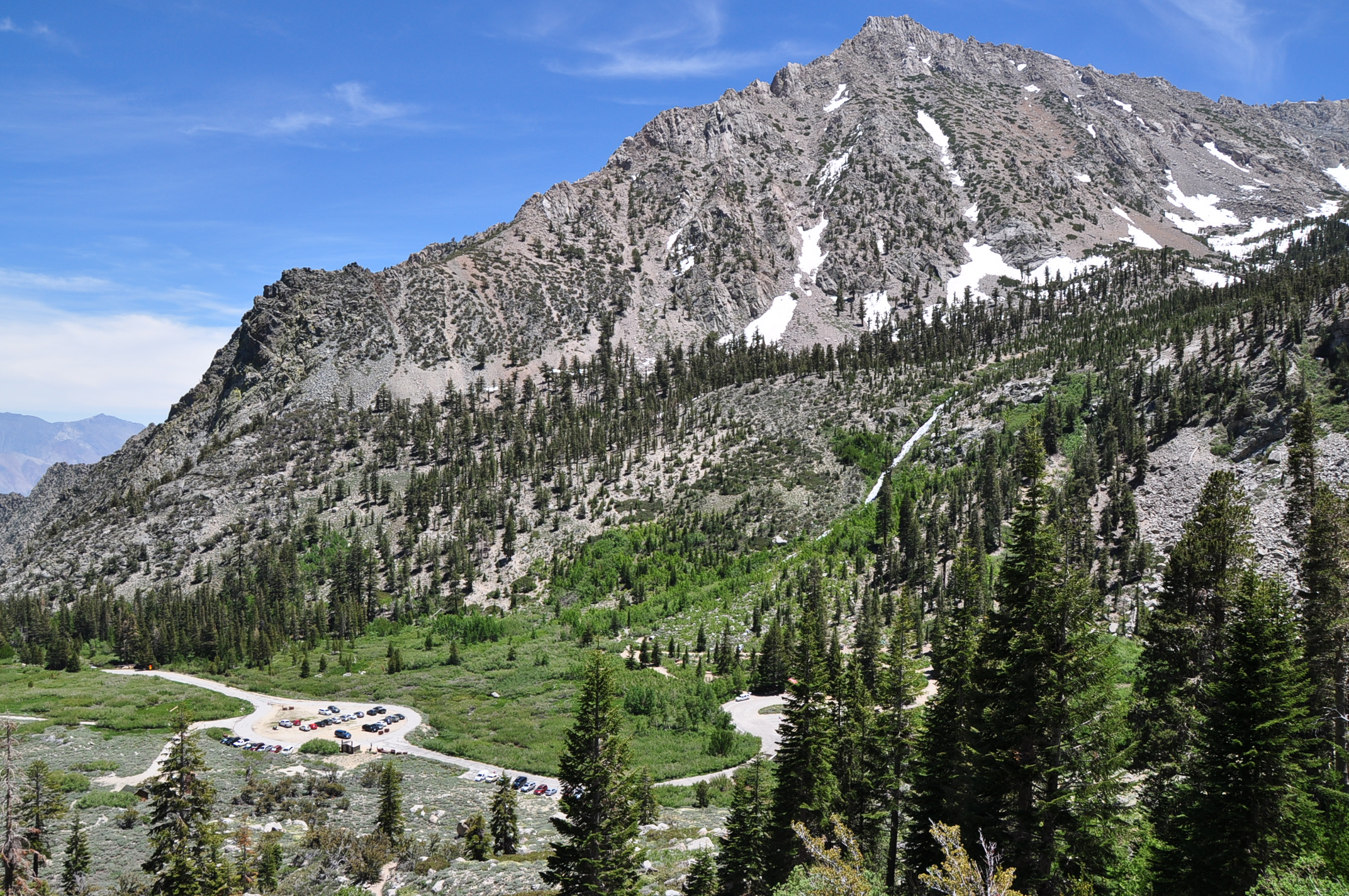
Independence Peak from Kearsarge Pass Trail

== See also ==
- Kearsarge Peak
- List of mountain peaks of California
