= Mobius Arch =

Natural arch in California

- Natural arch
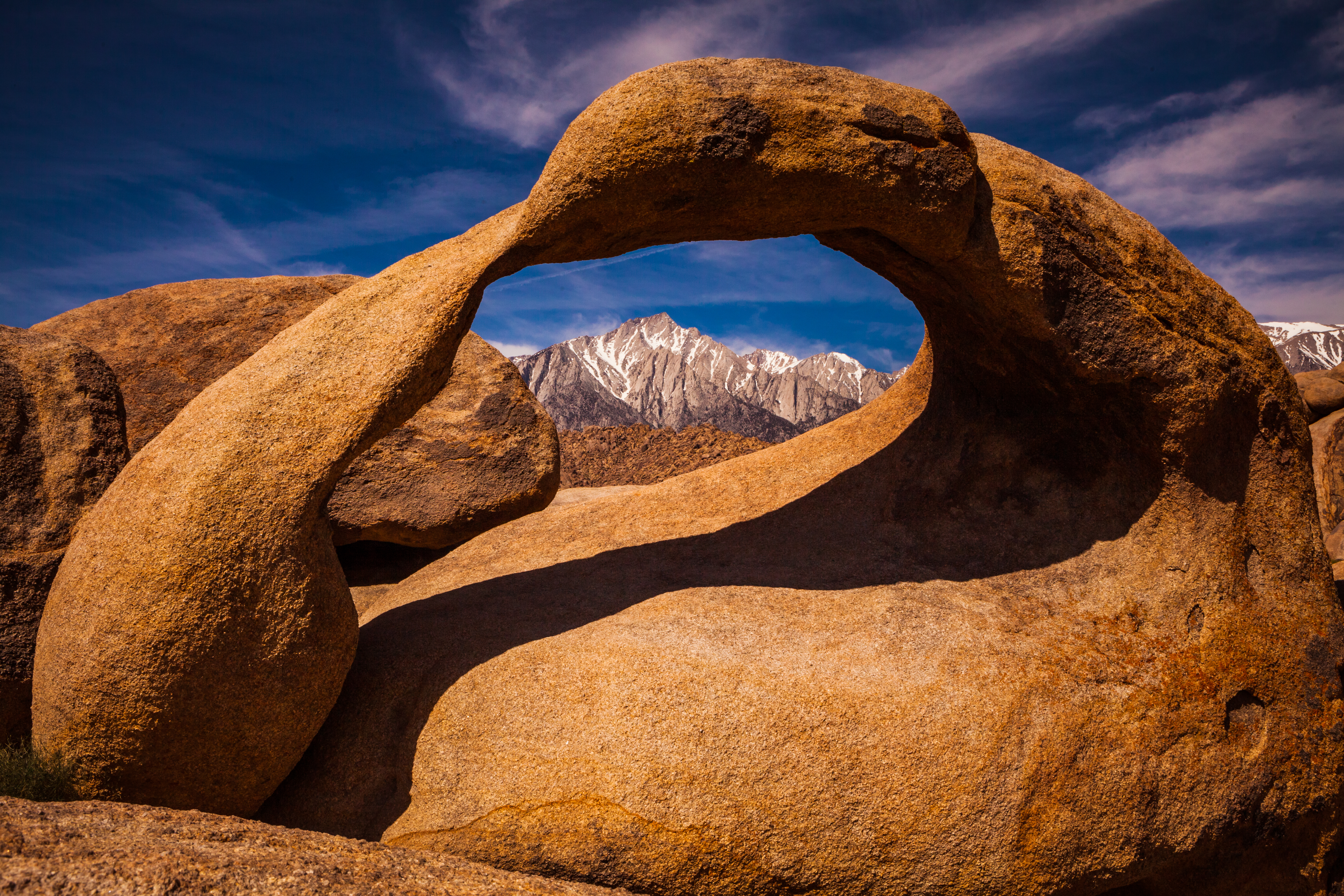
- The arch in 2019

- Coordinates: 36.6137°N 118.1256°W
- Location: Inyo County, California
- Range: Alabama Hills
- Etymology: Möbius strip
- Operator: Bureau of Land Management

Dimensions
  - Height: 6.5 ft (2.0 m) (window)
- Elevation: 4,677 ft (1,426 m)

Mobius Arch is a natural arch in the Alabama Hills range in Inyo County, California. Its name comes from its similarity in appearance to a Möbius strip. The nearest settlement is Lone Pine. It can be accessed through a short loop trail. The arch is a part of the Alabama Hills National Scenic Area and its window is about 6.5 ft (2.0 m) tall. It is a popular subject with photographers and filmmakers due to its framing of Mount Whitney.
