= Kearsarge Peak =

Mountain in California, United States

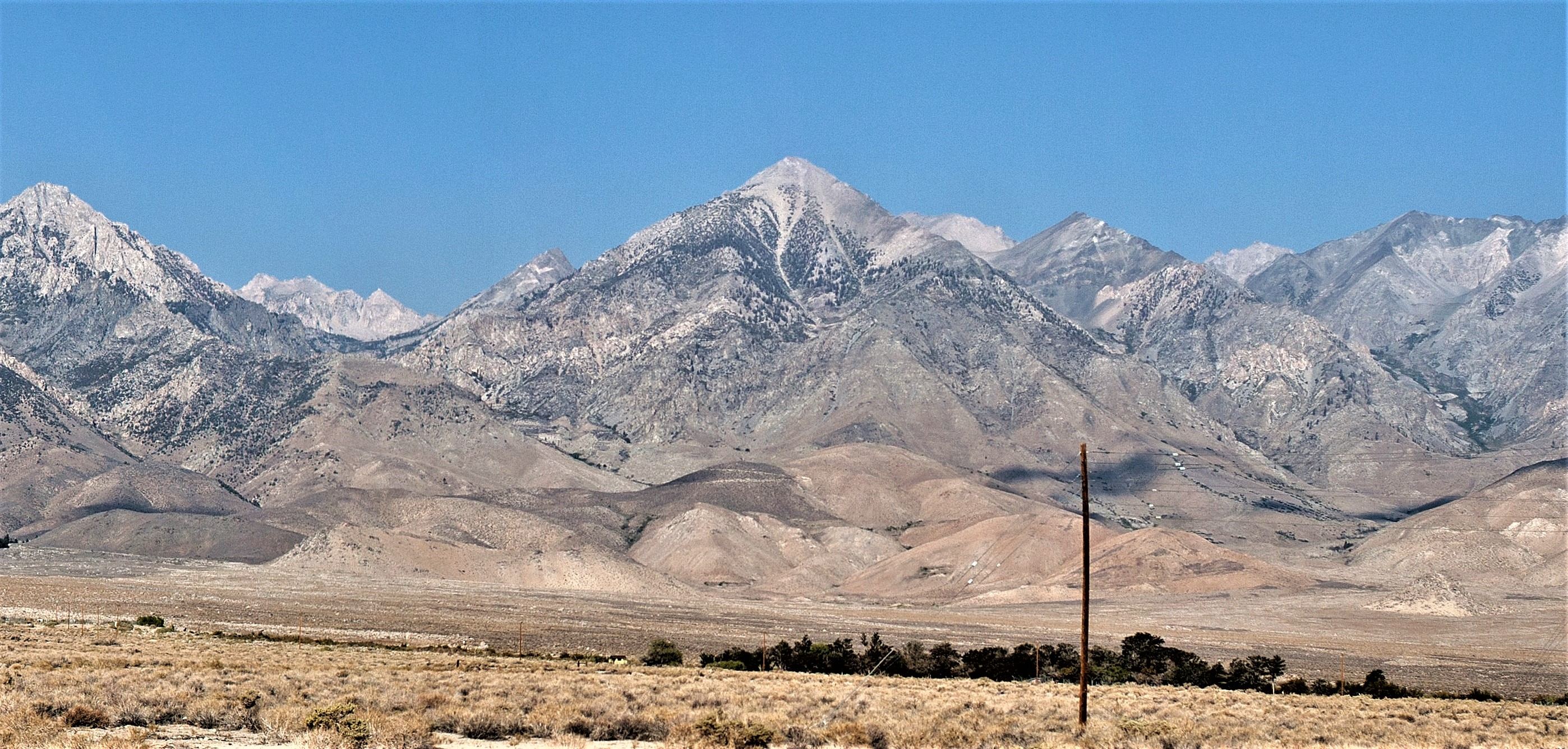
- East aspect, from Owens Valley

Highest point
- Elevation: 12,620 ft (3,850 m)
- Prominence: 535 ft (163 m)
- Parent peak: Peak 12719
- Isolation: 0.80 mi (1.29 km)
- Listing: Sierra Peaks Section
- Coordinates: 36°47′22″N 118°20′50″W

Geography
- Location within California Location within the United States
- Location: Inyo County, California, U.S.
- Country: United States of America
- State: California
- County: Inyo
- Parent range: Sierra Nevada
- Topo map: USGS Kearsarge Peak

Climbing
- First ascent: 1925 by Norman Clyde
- Easiest route: class 2

Kearsarge Peak is a 12,620-foot (3,847 m) mountain located less than two miles east of the crest of the Sierra Nevada mountain range, in Inyo County in northern California. It is situated immediately northwest of Onion Valley in the John Muir Wilderness, on land managed by Inyo National Forest. It is also 8.5 miles (13.7 km) west of the community of Independence, and 2.1 miles (3.4 km) north-northwest of Independence Peak. Topographic relief is significant as the east aspect rises 5,250 feet (1,600 meters) above Onion Valley in two miles.

== History ==
Kearsarge Peak, Kearsarge Pinnacles, Kearsarge Pass, and the Kearsarge Lakes were named after the Kearsarge mine on this peak's slope, which was named by its owners after the USS Kearsarge. In turn, the ship was named after Mount Kearsarge in New Hampshire.

The first ascent of the summit was made in 1925 by Norman Clyde, who is credited with 130 first ascents, most of which were in the Sierra Nevada. He was principal of the high school in Independence from 1924 to 1928, which provided him access to this peak near his home.

== Climate ==
According to the Köppen climate classification system, Kearsarge Peak has an alpine climate.Most weather fronts originate in the Pacific Ocean, and travel east toward the Sierra Nevada mountains. As fronts approach, they are forced upward by the peaks, causing them to drop their moisture in the form of rain or snowfall onto the range (orographic lift). Precipitation runoff from this mountain drains into Independence Creek and South Fork Oak Creek, thence Owens Valley.

== See also ==
- List of mountain peaks of California
