= Bubbs Creek =

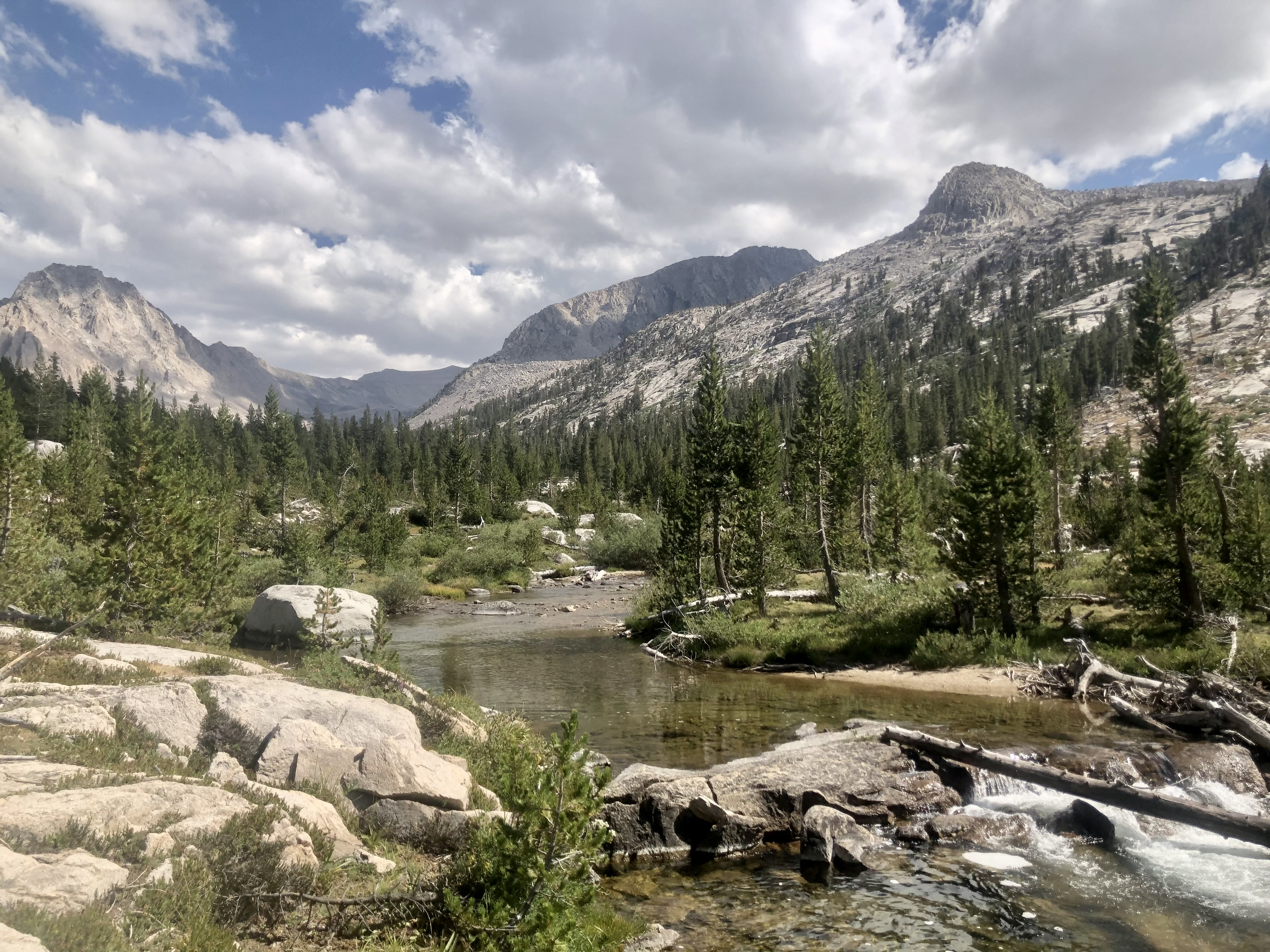
- Bubbs Creek, upstream of its junction with Vidette Creek, looking (roughly) south towards its headwaters

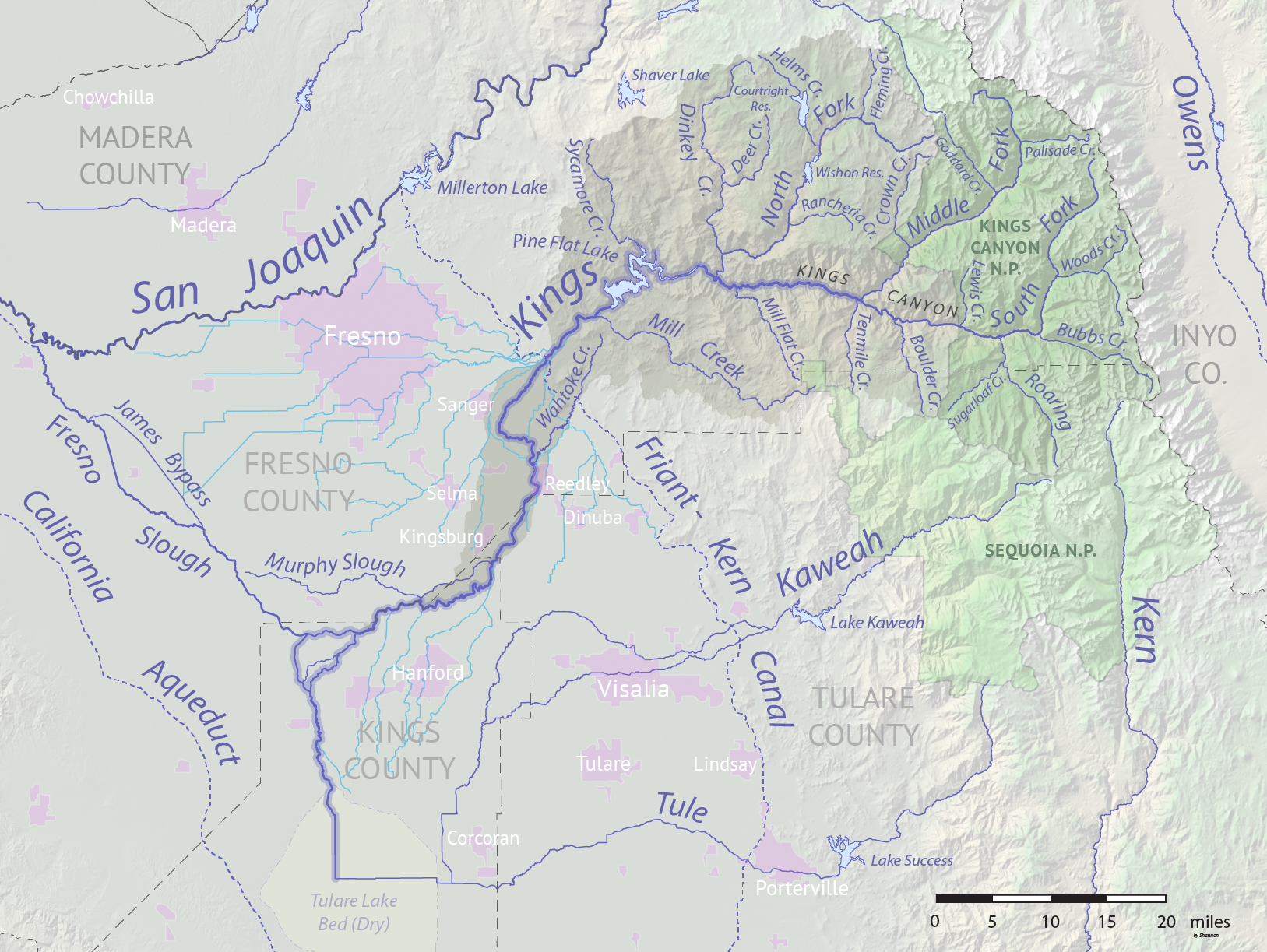
- Map of the Kings River drainage basin. Bubbs Creek joins the South Fork at right.

Location
- Country: United States
- State: California

Physical characteristics
- Source: Near Junction Pass
  - location: Sierra Nevada
  - coordinates: 36°41′47″N 118°21′02″W
  - elevation: 13,012 ft (3,966 m)
- Mouth: South Fork Kings River
  - location: above Kanawyers
  - coordinates: 36°47′22″N 118°33′03″W
  - elevation: 5,125 ft (1,562 m)
- Length: 16.4 mi (26.4 km)
- Basin size: 69.5 sq mi (180 km^{2})

Basin features
- Tributaries
  - left: East Creek
  - right: Charlotte Creek

Bubbs Creek is a 16.4-mile (26.4 km)-long tributary of the South Fork Kings River in the Sierra Nevada of California, within Kings Canyon National Park.

The creek originates near Junction Pass (east of Forester Pass), in northeastern Tulare County. It flows north through a chain of lakes and enters Fresno County, where it turns west, flowing in a deep glacial canyon. It joins the South Fork Kings River at the eastern end of Kings Canyon.

The Pacific Crest Trail follows Bubbs Creek from Forester Pass as far as Vidette Creek, and the Bubbs Creek Trail follows the creek downstream of that point into Kings Canyon.

Bubbs Creek is named for John Bubb, a prospector who crossed into the drainage from Owens Valley via Kearsarge Pass in 1864.

== See also ==
- List of rivers of California
