= Kearsarge, California =

Kearsarge Kearsarge City
- Former settlement
- Location in California
- Coordinates: 36°48′36″N 118°19′30″W
- Country: United States
- State: California
- County: Inyo
- Elevation: 8,830 ft (2,690 m)

Kearsarge or Kearsarge City is a former mining settlement in Inyo County, eastern California, United States. It was located high on the east slope of the Sierra Nevada, near Kearsage Pass, 8 miles (13 km) west of present-day town of Independence.

The mining camp was in the Kearsarge Mining District, located just below the 12,621-foot-high (3,847 m) high granite Kearsarge Peak, and east of the Kearsarge Pass.

== History ==
Kearsarge was named after the Union man-of-war USS Kearsarge, which had recently sunk the Confederate ship CSS Alabama off the coast of France. A nearby settlement had been named Alabama Hills by Confederate sympathizers, so this "evened the score" after the naval battle.

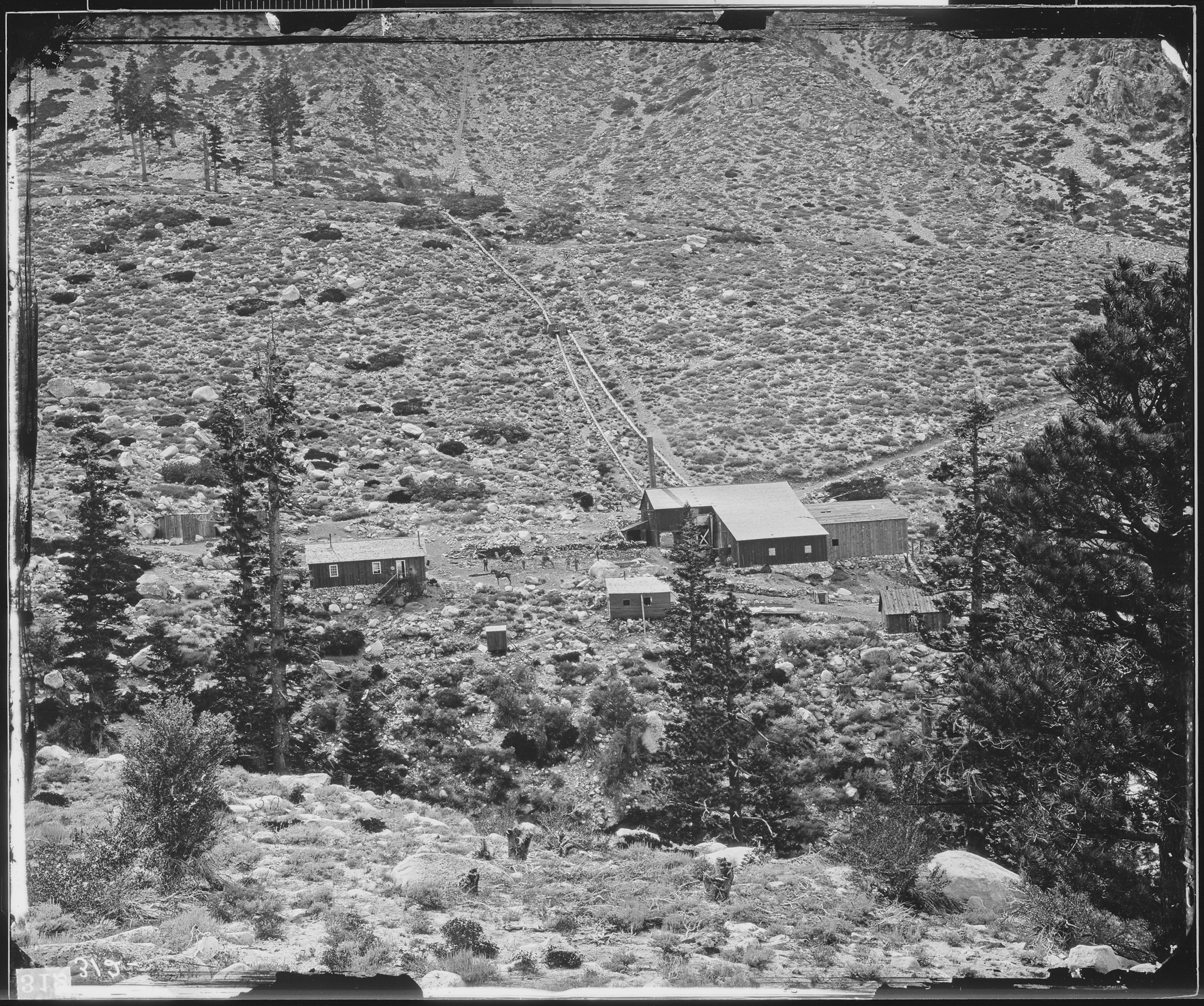
Kearsarge Mining Company, 1871

In the Autumn of 1864, on the side of a then-unnamed mountain, five woodcutters discovered a vein of rich silver and gold ore. The men staked their claims to Kearsarge, Silver Sprout, and Virginia Mines. They mined and shipped four tons of ore to a stamp mill in Nevada, receiving $900 a ton. The news of location of their mine leaked out, and the Kearsarge Mining District, and eponymous mining camp below the mines, was established high in the Eastern Sierra.

Several mine investors purchased the three main silver claims, forming the Kearsarge Mining Company. These new owners had driven a 50-foot (15 m) tunnel into the southeast side of the mountain by August 1865, reaching $650+ per ton ore.

After a winter of heavy snow, on the afternoon of March 1, 1866, an avalanche swept away most of the town and some of the population, killing the wife of the mine foreman and injuring several men. A camp was relocated to a safer site nearby, but most of the town's population departed, except the miners who continued to operate the mines and a mill that was constructed that summer. The Rex Montis mine, which became the principal gold source in the District, was worked on a large scale from 1875 to 1883.

Kearsarge was mostly abandoned by 1888. The mill was removed and little else remained, but it was occupied intermittently as attempts were later made to revive the mines with little success.
