= Kearsarge Pass =

Mountain pass in California, US

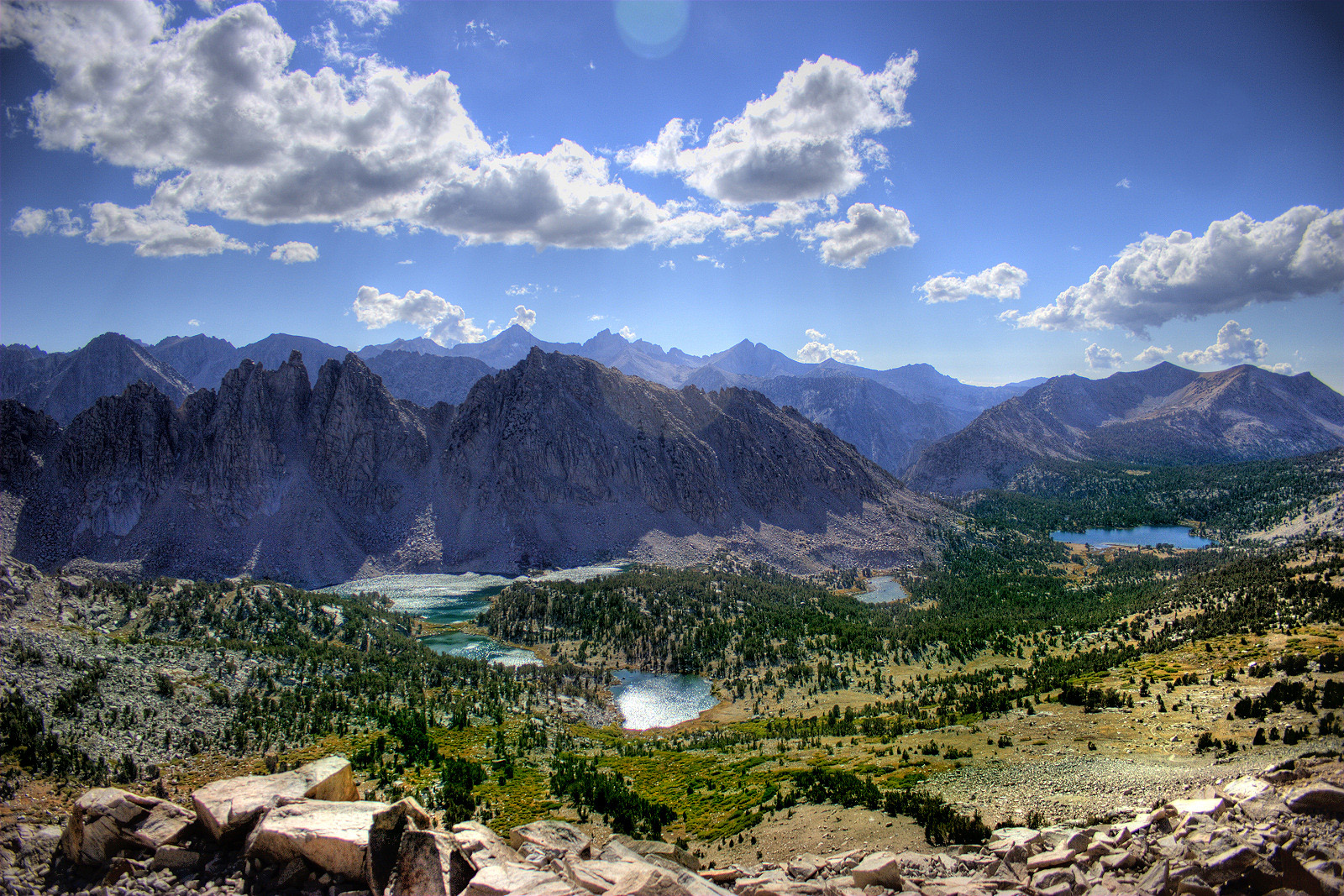
- View west into the Sierra Nevada
- Interactive map of Kearsarge Pass
- Elevation: 11,709 feet (3,569 m)
- Traversed by: Kearsarge Pass Trail

Third Approach
- Location: Fresno / Inyo counties, California, US
- Range: Sierra Nevada
- Coordinates: 36°46′21″N 118°22′34″W

Kearsarge Pass is a pass in the Sierra Nevada of California. The pass lies on the Sierra Crest at 11,709 feet (3,569 m). The pass permits foot traffic between Kings Canyon National Park and the John Muir Wilderness.

The pass was named after the Kearsarge mine to the east, which was named by its owners after the USS Kearsarge, the ship that destroyed the CSS Alabama. The Alabama Hills were named after the latter ship, and the mine was named in reaction. The first known crossing of Kearsarge Pass was in 1864.

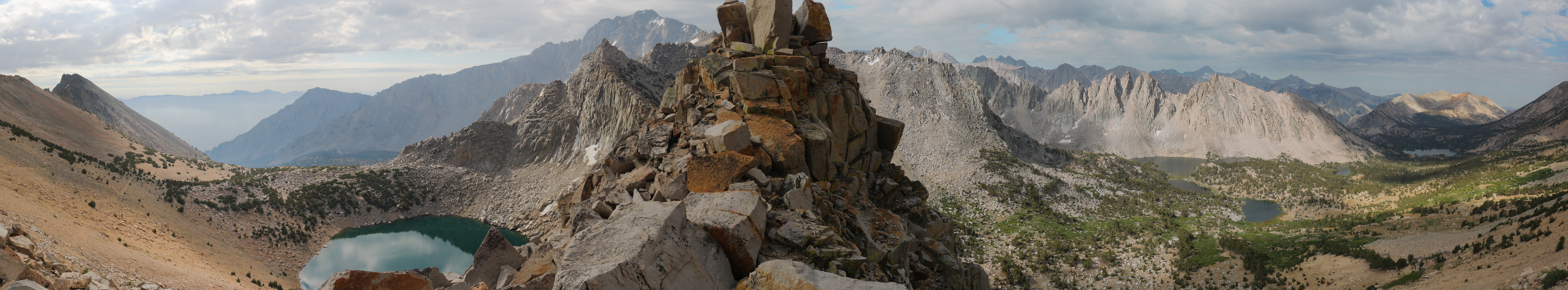
Panorama from the pass

== See also ==
- Kearsarge Pinnacles
