= Dragon Peak (California) =

Mountain in the state of California

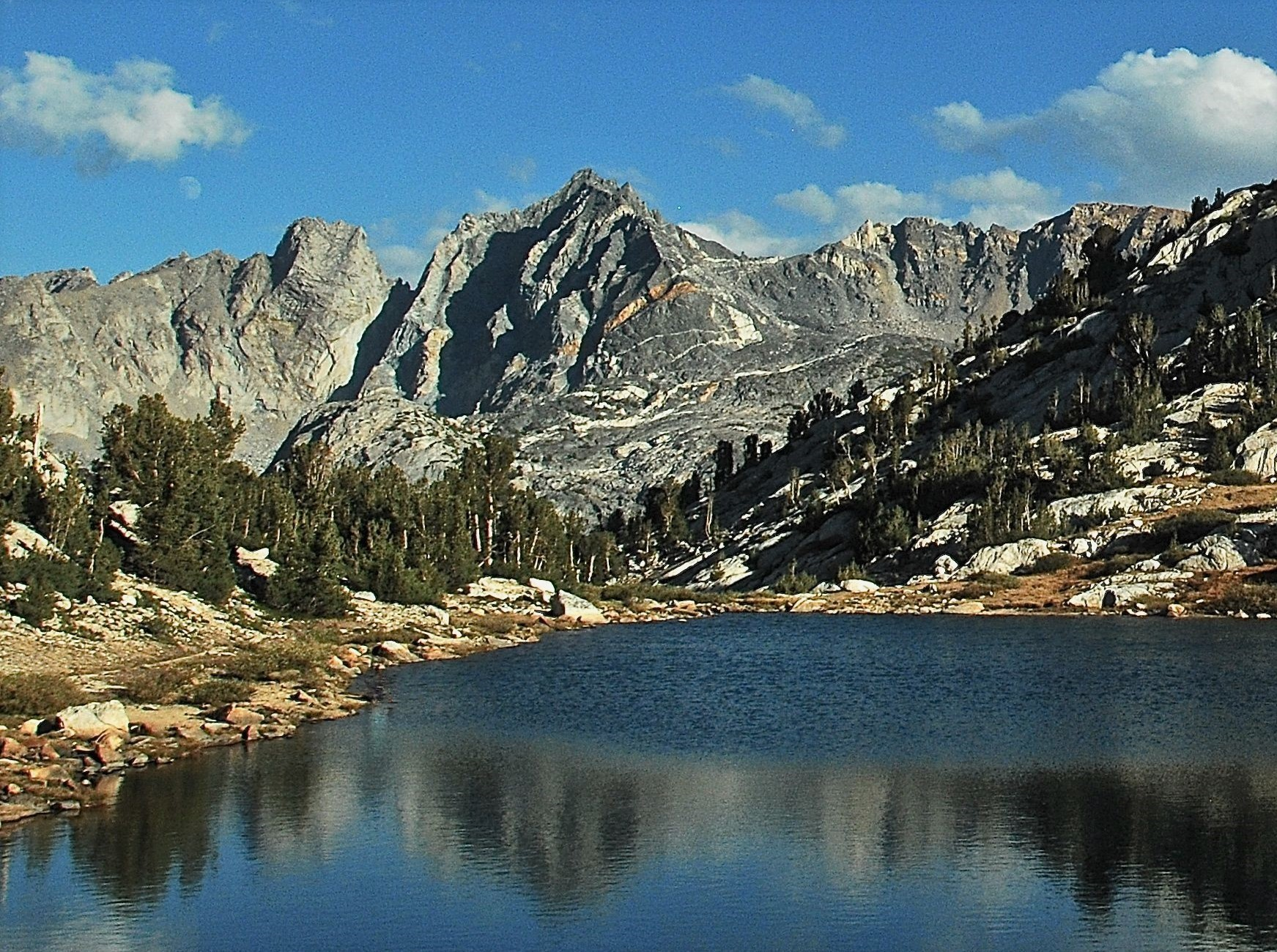
- Northwest aspect

Highest point
- Elevation: 12,955 ft (3,949 m)
- Prominence: 296 ft (90 m)
- Parent peak: Mount Gould (13,011 ft)
- Isolation: 0.75 mi (1.21 km)
- Listing: Sierra Peaks Section; Vagmarken Club Sierra Crest List
- Coordinates: 36°47′23″N 118°22′33″W

Geography
- Location within California Location within the United States
- Location: Kings Canyon National Park; Inyo / Fresno counties California, U.S.
- Parent range: Sierra Nevada
- Topo map: USGS Mount Clarence King

Geology
- Mountain type: Fault block
- Rock type: Metamorphic rock

Climbing
- First ascent: 1920
- Easiest route: class 4 scrambling

Dragon Peak is a 12,955-foot-elevation (3,949-meter) mountain summit located on the crest of the Sierra Nevada mountain range in northern California. It is situated on the common border of Fresno County with Inyo County, as well as the boundary shared by John Muir Wilderness and Kings Canyon National Park. It is 10 miles (16 km) west of the community of Independence, and 1.3 miles (2.1 km) south of Black Mountain. Dragon Peak ranks as the 161st-highest summit in California. Topographic relief is significant as the north aspect rises 1,900 feet (580 meters) above Dragon Lake in less than one mile. This mountain is habitat for the endangered Sierra Nevada bighorn sheep, which restricts climbing from July through December, so most ascents are made in the spring. The first ascent of the summit was made in 1920 by either Norman Clyde, or Fred Parker and J. E. Rother. The John Muir Trail traverses two miles west of this peak, providing an approach option. The mountain is so named because of the shape of its outline as seen from Rae Lakes.

== Climate ==
According to the Köppen climate classification system, Dragon Peak has an alpine climate. Most weather fronts originate in the Pacific Ocean, and travel east toward the Sierra Nevada mountains. As fronts approach, they are forced upward by the peaks (orographic lift), causing them to drop their moisture in the form of rain or snowfall onto the range. Precipitation runoff from this mountain drains east to the Owens Valley via Independence Creek, and west into the Kings River watershed.

== See also ==
- List of mountain peaks of California
