= Center Peak =

Mountain summit of the Sierra Nevada mountain range, in Tulare County, California

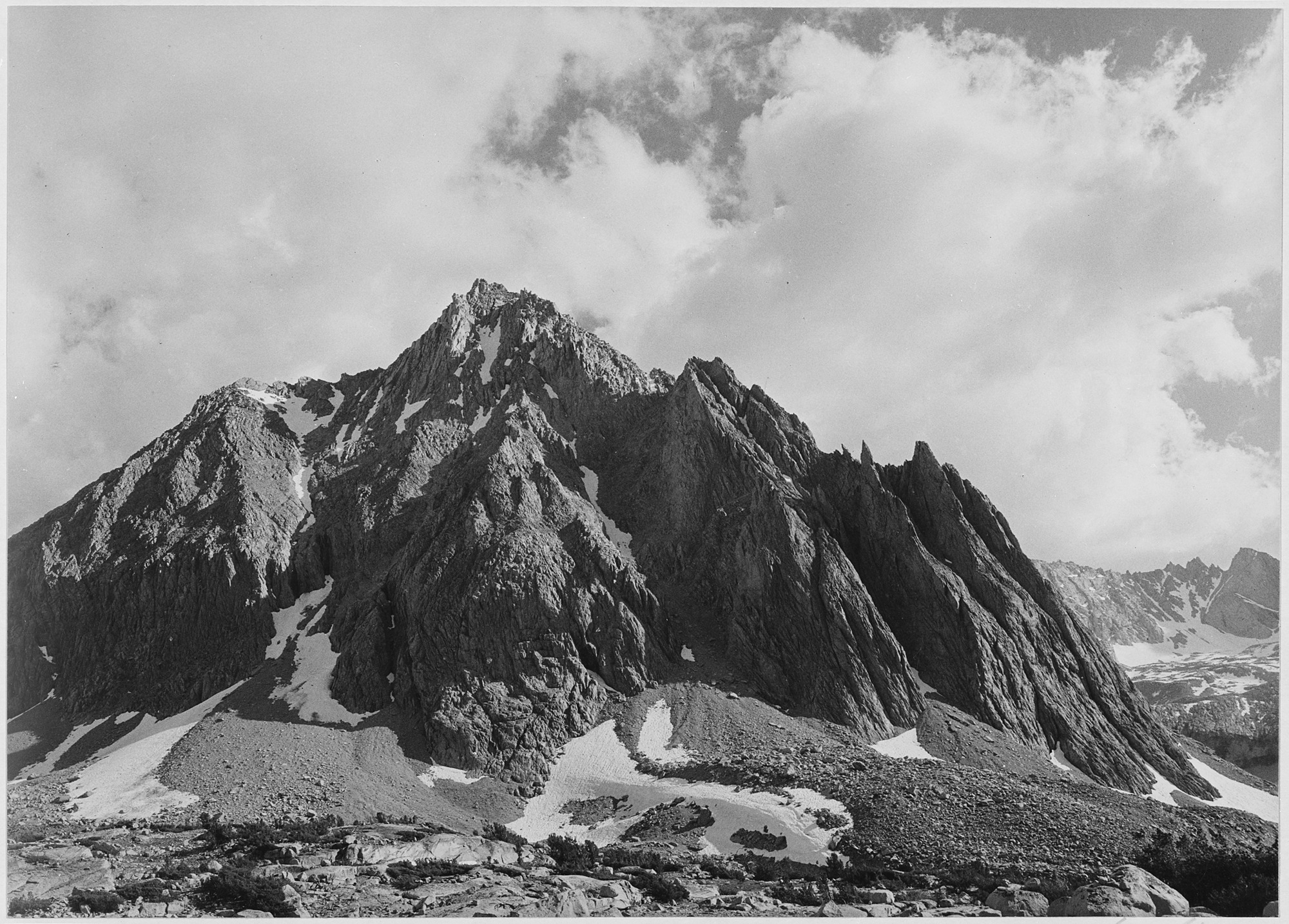
- North-northeast aspect, by Ansel Adams ca. 1936

Highest point
- Elevation: 12,760 ft (3,890 m)
- Prominence: 427 ft (130 m)
- Parent peak: Mount Bradley (13,270 ft)
- Isolation: 1.42 mi (2.29 km)
- Listing: Sierra Peaks Section
- Coordinates: 36°43′19″N 118°21′46″W

Geography
- Location within California Location within the United States
- Location: Kings Canyon National Park; Tulare County; California, U.S.
- Parent range: Sierra Nevada
- Topo map: USGS Mount Williamson

Climbing
- First ascent: July 5, 1898, by C. B. Bradley
- Easiest route: class 4 scrambling

Center Peak is a 12,760-foot-elevation (3,890-meter) mountain summit located one mile west of the crest of the Sierra Nevada mountain range, in the northeast corner of Tulare County in northern California. It is situated in eastern Kings Canyon National Park, 11 miles (18 km) southwest of the community of Independence, 1.8 miles (2.9 km) south of University Peak, and two miles north of Forester Pass. Topographic relief is significant as the north aspect rises 2,230 feet (680 meters) above Bubbs Creek in one mile. The John Muir Trail which traverses below the west slope of this remote peak provides an approach.

== History ==
Cornelius Beach Bradley and Robert M. Price, each of the Sierra Club, named it in 1898 when Bradley made the first ascent: "Two of these promontories, standing guard, as it were, the one at the entrance to the valley and the other just within it, form a striking pair, and we named them the Videttes. A third, standing more detached, and in the very center of the mighty cirque at the head of the valley, we named Center Peak." The north face was first climbed by David Brower and Hervey Voge on May 22, 1934. The class 5.7 Northwest Arête is considered one of the classic climbing routes in the Sierra Nevada, and was first climbed in 1983 by Claude Fiddler and Vern Clevenger.

== Climate ==
According to the Köppen climate classification system, Center Peak is located in an alpine climate zone. Most weather fronts originate in the Pacific Ocean, and travel east toward the Sierra Nevada mountains. As fronts approach, they are forced upward by the peaks, causing them to drop their moisture in the form of rain or snowfall onto the range (orographic lift). Precipitation runoff from the mountain drains into headwaters of Bubbs Creek, a tributary of the South Fork Kings River.

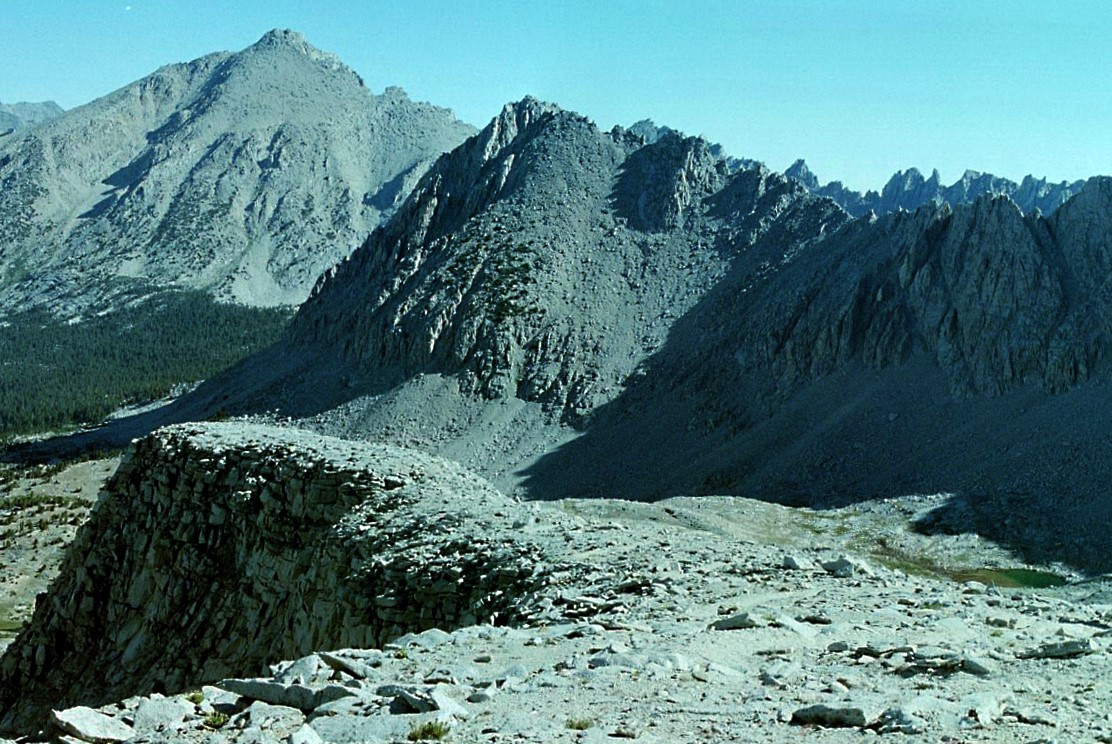
Center Peak seen from the Forester Pass area. (University Peak upper left)

== See also ==
- List of mountain peaks of California
