= Mount Gould (California) =

Mountain in the American state of California

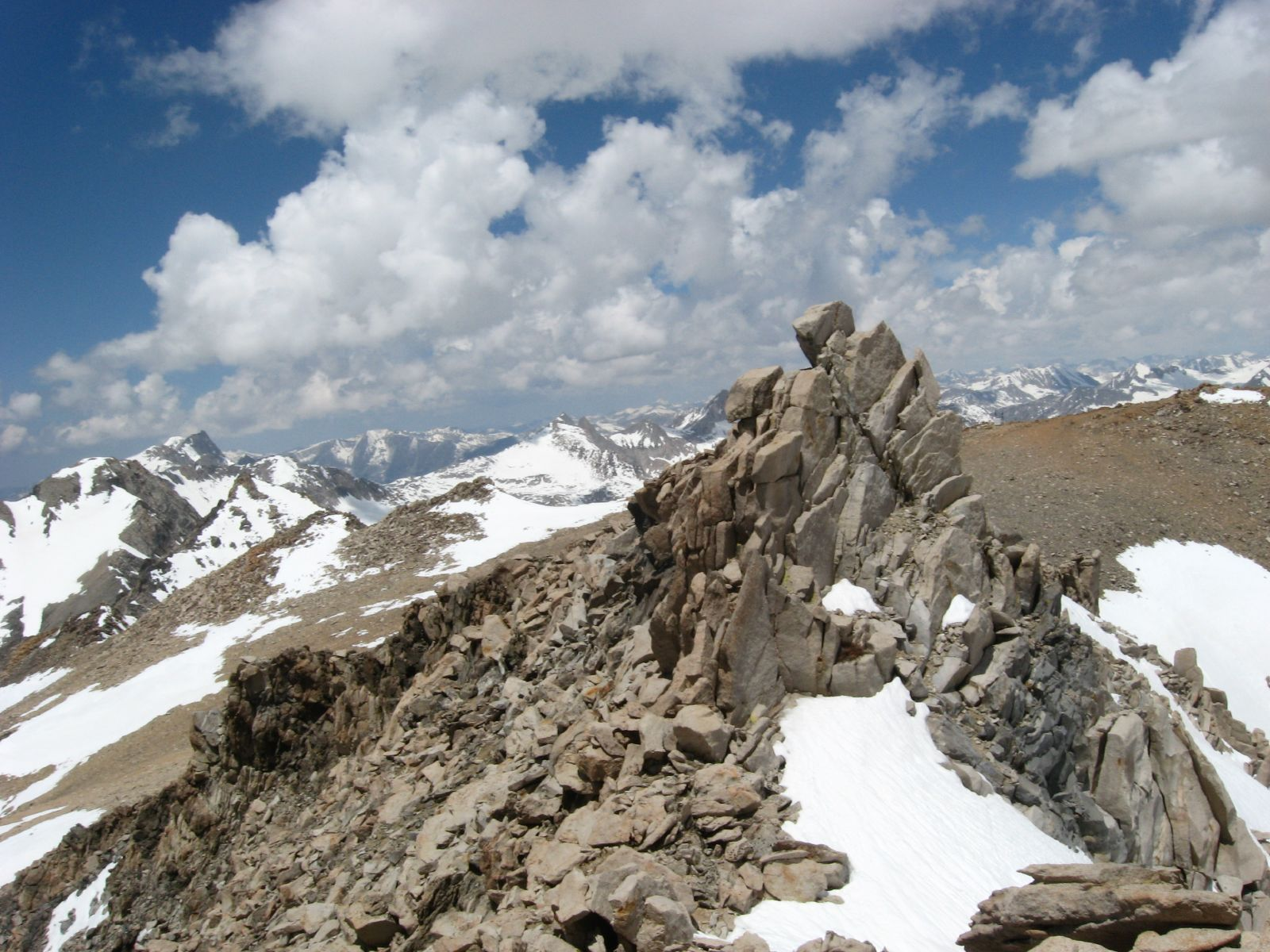
- Mount Gould's summit from its south ridge, May 2009.

Highest point
- Elevation: 13,011 ft (3,966 m) NAVD 88
- Prominence: 1,030 ft (314 m)
- Parent peak: Black Mountain
- Listing: Sierra Peaks Section
- Coordinates: 36°46′48″N 118°22′40″W

Geography
- Location within California Location within the United States
- Location: Fresno / Inyo counties California, U.S.
- Parent range: Sierra Nevada
- Topo map: USGS Mount Clarence King

Climbing
- First ascent: 1890, by J. N. LeConte, Hubert Dyer, Fred Pheby, and C. B. Lakeman
- Easiest route: Simple Scramble, class 3

Mount Gould is a thirteener on the Sierra crest, just north of the Kearsarge Pass.

== Geography ==
Mount Gould's north-south ridge straddles the boundary between Fresno County and Kings Canyon National Park to the west, and Inyo County and the John Muir Wilderness to the east. Its western slopes drain to the Kings River, and its eastern slopes feed the Owens River. Its nearest neighboring peaks are Dragon Peak to the north across Gould Pass, and Nameless Pyramid to the south across Kearsarge Pass.

== Climbing history ==
The first recorded ascent was in 1890 by Joseph N. LeConte, Hubert P. Dyer, Fred S. Pheby, and C. B. Lakeman. They called it University Peak. They scrambled the talus of Gould's south ridge, and climbed the more solid rock of its summit block. This route, by way of the Kearsarge Pass Trail from the Onion Valley trailhead, remains the easiest and most accessible approach. In 1896, LeConte and a party climbed a higher peak, 2.4 miles (3.9 km) to the south, to which he transferred the name, University Peak. The next day he led a second climb of Mount Gould and named it for his companion, Wilson S. Gould.

== See also ==
- Thirteener
