= Black Mountain (Inyo and Fresno counties, California) =

Mountain in the American state of California

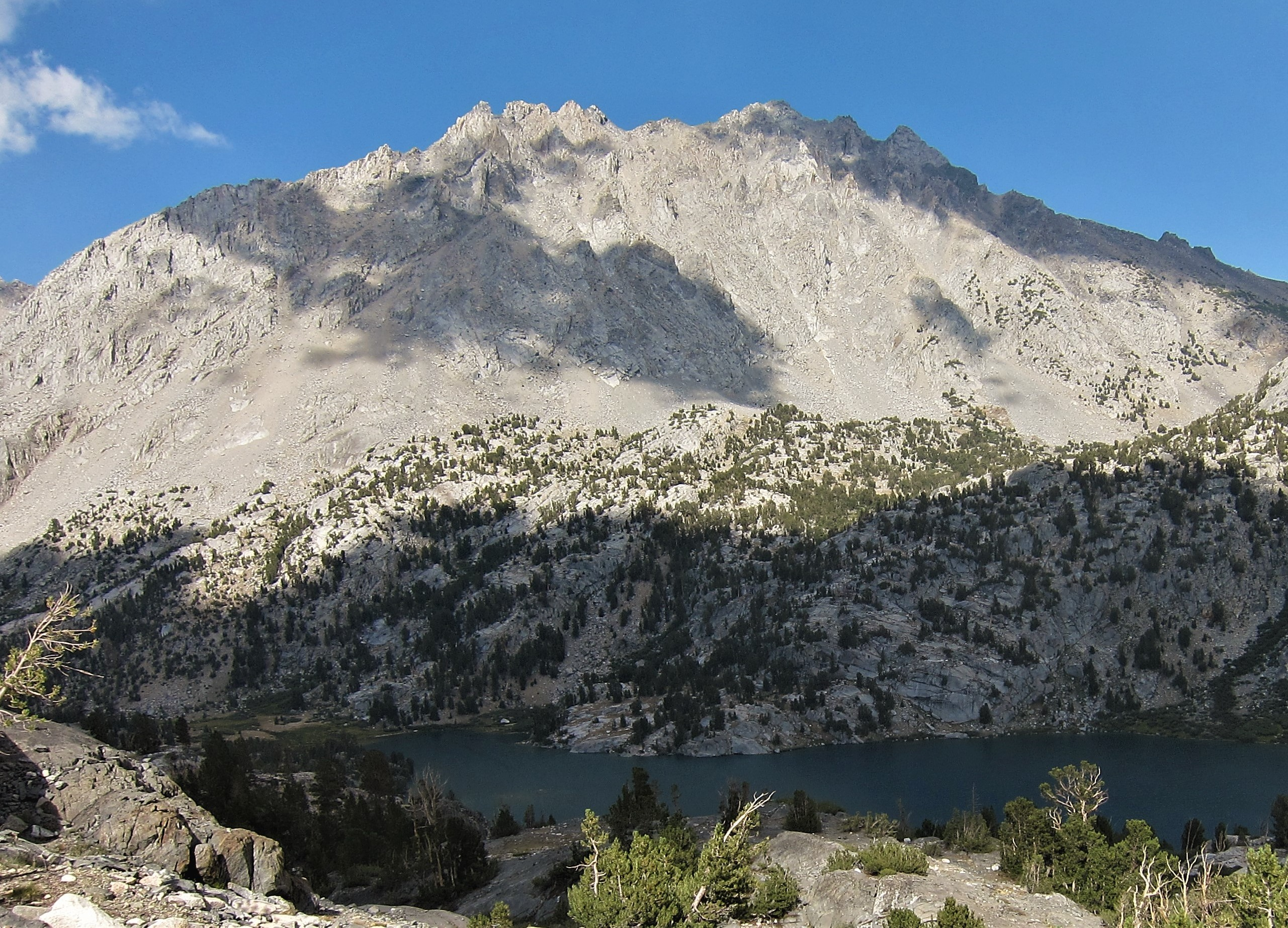
- WSW aspect from JMT

Highest point
- Elevation: 13,291 ft (4,051 m) NAVD 88
- Prominence: 1,579 ft (481 m)
- Parent peak: University Peak
- Isolation: 4.27 mi (6.87 km)
- Listing: Sierra Peaks Section
- Coordinates: 36°48′33″N 118°22′41″W

Geography
- Location within California Location within the United States
- Location: Kings Canyon National Park; Inyo / Fresno counties California, U.S.
- Parent range: Sierra Nevada
- Topo map: USGS Mount Clarence King

Geology
- Rock type: granitic

Climbing
- First ascent: 1905 by George R. Davis
- Easiest route: Scramble, class 2

Black Mountain is a 13,291-foot-elevation (4,051-meter) mountain summit located on the crest of the Sierra Nevada mountain range in northern California. It is situated on the common border of Fresno County with Inyo County, as well as the shared boundary of John Muir Wilderness and Kings Canyon National Park. It is 10.5 miles (16.9 km) west of the community of Independence, and 4.3 miles (6.9 km) north-northwest of parent University Peak. Black Mountain ranks as the 91st highest summit in California. Topographic relief is significant as the west aspect rises 2,750 feet (840 meters) above Rae Lakes in approximately one mile. The John Muir Trail traverses below the west aspect of this peak, providing an approach to the mountain. The first ascent of the summit was made in 1905 by George R. Davis, a USGS topographer. This mountain is habitat for the endangered Sierra Nevada bighorn sheep, which restricts climbing from July through December, so most ascents are made in the spring.

== Climate ==
According to the Köppen climate classification system, Black Mountain has an alpine climate. Most weather fronts originate in the Pacific Ocean, and travel east toward the Sierra Nevada mountains. As fronts approach, they are forced upward by the peaks, causing them to drop their moisture in the form of rain or snowfall onto the range (orographic lift). Precipitation runoff from this mountain drains east to the Owens Valley via Oak Creek, and west into the Kings River watershed.

== Gallery ==
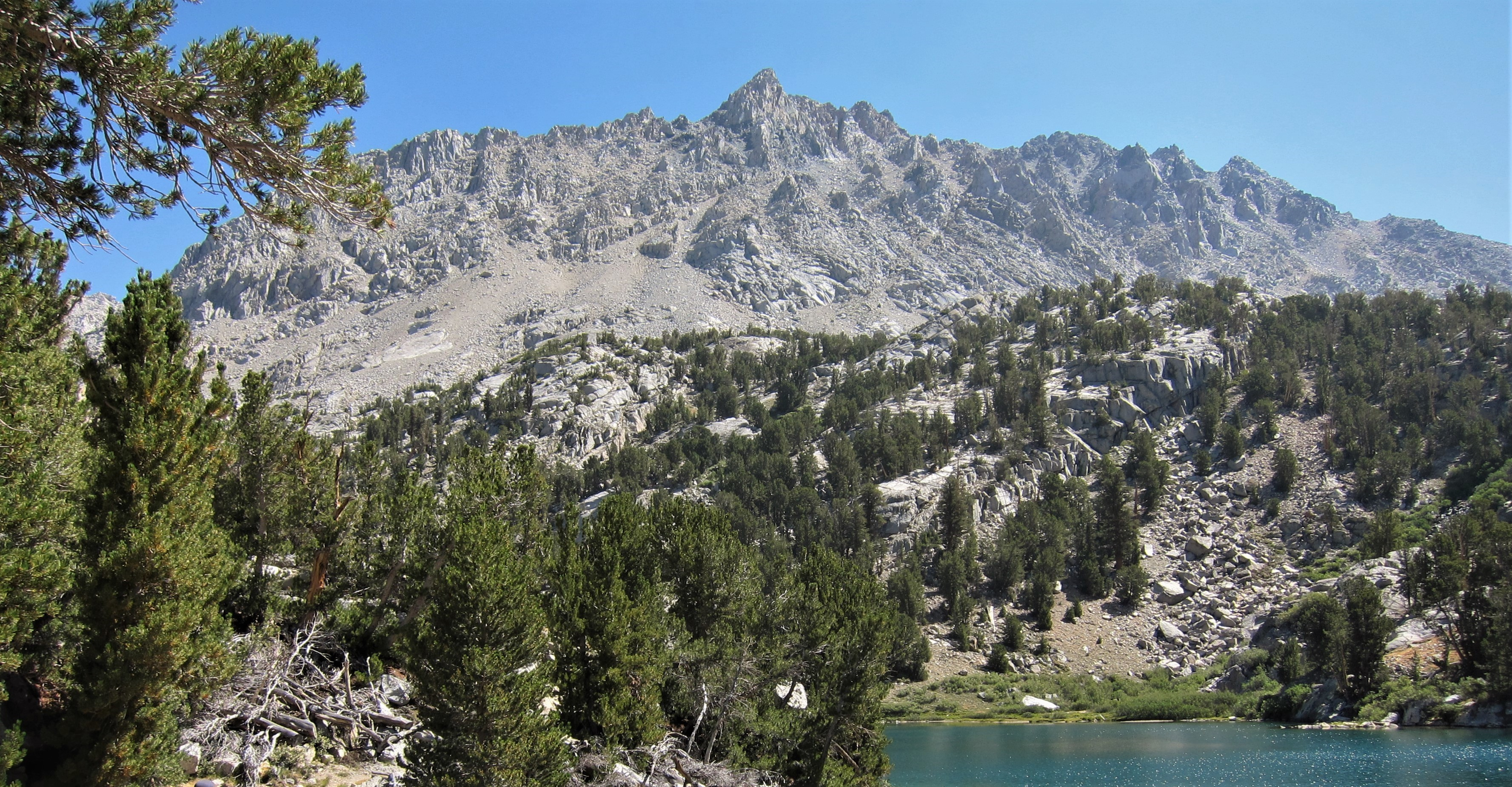
From the west at Rae Lakes

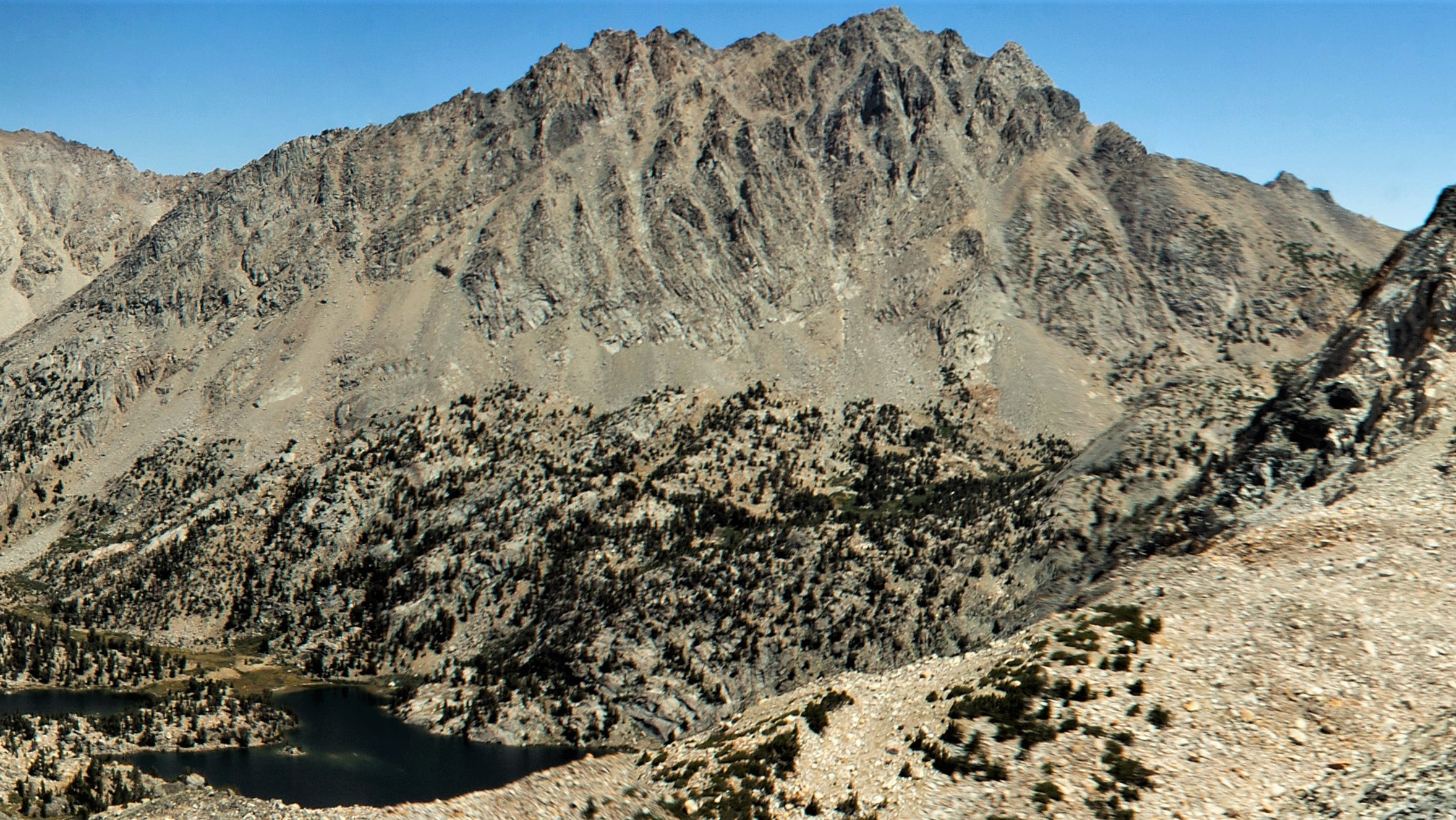
Southwest aspect from Glen Pass

== See also ==
- List of mountain peaks of California
- Dragon Peak
