= Mount Baxter (California) =

Mountain in the state of California

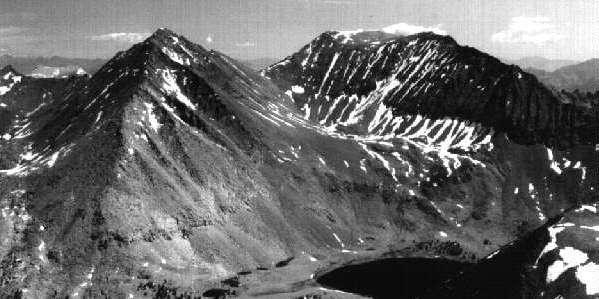
- Mount Baxter is on the right, viewed from the north

Highest point
- Elevation: 13,141 ft (4,005 m) NAVD 88
- Prominence: 603 ft (184 m)
- Parent peak: Acrodectes Peak
- Listing: Sierra Peaks Section
- Coordinates: 36°51′41″N 118°21′44″W

Geography
- Location within California Location within the United States
- Location: Fresno and Inyo counties, California, U.S.
- Parent range: Sierra Nevada
- Topo map: USGS Kearsarge Peak

Geology
- Rock age: Cretaceous
- Mountain type: Granitic

Climbing
- First ascent: 1905 by George Davis
- Easiest route: Scramble, class 2

Mount Baxter is a peak along the crest of the Sierra Nevada in California. Mount Baxter is on the boundary between Kings Canyon National Park and the John Muir Wilderness just north of Baxter Pass and to the northeast of the Rae Lakes, a popular backpacking destination along the John Muir Trail.

Mount Baxter is named for John Baxter, who was a rancher in the Owens Valley.

The mountain provides habitat for the endangered Sierra Nevada bighorn sheep and was closed to entry in the recent past.
