= Trial and Error (1997 film) =

- Theatrical release poster
- Directed by: Jonathan Lynn
- Screenplay by: Sara Bernstein; Gregory Bernstein
- Story by: Sara Bernstein; Gregory Bernstein; Cliff Gardner
- Produced by: Gary Ross; Jonathan Lynn
- Starring: Michael Richards; Jeff Daniels; Charlize Theron; Jessica Steen; Rip Torn
- Cinematography: Gabriel Beristain
- Edited by: Tony Lombardo
- Music by: Phil Marshall
- Production company: Larger Than Life Productions
- Distributed by: New Line Cinema
- Release date: May 30, 1997
- Running time: 98 minutes
- Country: United States
- Language: English
- Budget: $25 million
- Box office: $14,598,571

Trial and Error is a 1997 American comedy film directed by Jonathan Lynn and starring Michael Richards, Jeff Daniels, and Charlize Theron. The film's plot concerns an attorney and his actor friend, who takes his place in court to defend his boss's hopelessly guilty relative.

== Plot ==
Charlie Tuttle has just been made partner in a successful law firm, Whitfield and Morris. His boss and future father-in-law sends him to Paradise Bluff, Nevada, to request a continuance in a mail fraud case involving a cousin-in-law who is likely to be found guilty. But the timing of the trip conflicts with Charlie's bachelor party. After Charlie drives from California to Paradise Bluff, he is unexpectedly greeted by his best man, actor Richard Rietti, who is determined to show his friend a great time prior to his wedding.

During the celebration, Charlie is knocked out in a barfight, and is later prescribed painkillers for the resulting pain. The next day — the day of the court appearance — Richard checks on his friend and finds Charlie has taken all of the pills in the bottle. Charlie winds up in no shape to appear in court that day, as legal counsel for con artist Benny Gibbs, so Richard impersonates Charlie. When the case unexpectedly goes to trial, Richard and Charlie must continue the charade, or they both will go to prison for perpetrating a fraud upon the court.

Charlie coaches Richard as to the use of the rules of evidence, masquerading as Richard's "assistant", surreptitiously using flash cards to tell Richard which basis for objection to use. Charlie eventually loses his temper and screams at the Judge Paul Graff, trying to overrule Charlie, when Richard disobeys Charlie and takes the "defense" in a broader direction, and Charlie is banned from reentering the courthouse. Later, Richard and Charlie devise a communication system involving a baby monitor and morse-code sounding of Charlie's vehicle's horn, heard through an open window, to instruct Richard as to which type of objection to use.

During the course of the story, Charlie meets and falls in love with an attractive waitress named Billie Tyler who causes Charlie to rethink his impending wedding to his shrill, self-absorbed fiancée, Tiffany. As the trial nears its end, Richard becomes involved with the prosecutor, Elizabeth, against whom he ultimately finds due process for "his client".

== Cast ==
- Michael Richards as Richard Rietti
- Jeff Daniels as Charlie Tuttle
- Charlize Theron as Billie Tyler
- Jessica Steen as Elizabeth Gardner
- Austin Pendleton as Judge Paul Z. Graff
- Rip Torn as Benjamin Matthew "Benny" Gibbs
- Alexandra Wentworth as Tiffany Whitfield
- Jennifer Coolidge as Jacqueline "Jackie" Turreau
- Lawrence Pressman as Whitfield
- Dale Dye as Dr. German Stone
- Max Casella as Dr. Brown

== Production ==
Filming for Trial and Error occurred in Independence, California. Shooting locations included the Inyo County Courthouse and Winnedumah Hotel.

== Release ==
The film was released in the United States on May 30, 1997. In Italy, to film was renamed Ancora più scemo ("Even Dumber") and in Japan the film was renamed Mr.ダマー2 1/2 ("Dumb and Dumber 2 1/2") to capitalize on the success of Daniels' earlier film, Dumb and Dumber (1994). The two films are completely unrelated other than starring Jeff Daniels. It was the last film released by New Line Cinema to have the byline "A Turner Company" in the studio's opening logo, as 8 months earlier, Time Warner merged with Turner Broadcasting System (including New Line Cinema which it purchased in 1994), with later films having the byline "A Time Warner Company".

== Reception ==
Despite Richards' popularity on Seinfeld, and Daniels' success as a comic actor in Dumb and Dumber, Trial and Error was a box office disappointment and earned mixed critical reviews. Trial and Error earned only around $13 million domestically against a $25 million budget, and holds a rating of 51% on Rotten Tomatoes based on 35 reviews. The site's consensus states: "Trial and Error gets some laughs out of the comedic chemistry between its pleasantly mismatched leads, although the results are still somewhat less than memorable."

Positive appraisals came from Roger Ebert and Leonard Maltin, both awarding it three stars out of a possible four. Ebert thought the film was reminiscent of Billy Wilder's understated comedies, which "got a lot of the laughs by playing scenes straight" rather than going for obvious comedic gags. Many critics noted similarities to director Jonathan Lynn's earlier critically and commercially successful courtroom comedy My Cousin Vinny. Austin Pendleton, who played defense attorney John Gibbons in My Cousin Vinny, also appeared in Trial and Error, this time as the judge.
