= Mount Whitney Fish Hatchery =

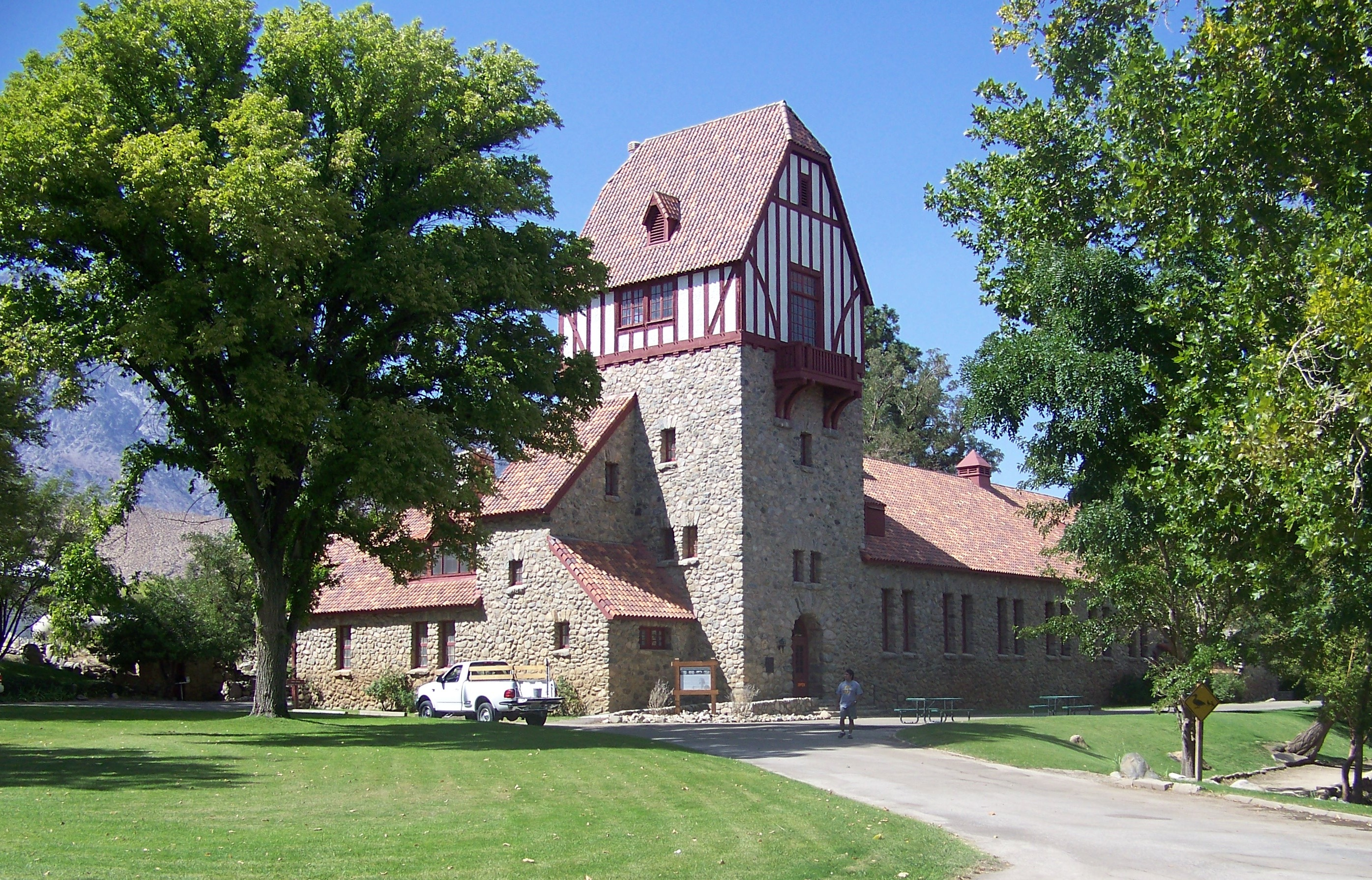
- The historic Mount Whitney Fish hatchery, located in Independence, California
- Interactive map of Mount Whitney Fish Hatchery
- Coordinates: 36.83111°N 118.24469°W
- Area: 40 acres (16 ha)
- Elevation: 4,000 feet (1,200 m)
- Built: 1916 - 1917
- Architect: Charles Dean

The Mount Whitney Fish Hatchery, located in Independence, California, United States, is an historic fish hatchery that has played an important role in the preservation of the golden trout, California's freshwater state fish.

== Construction ==
The facility was built and operated by the California State Fish & Game Commission, now known as the California Department of Fish and Wildlife. Starting in 1915, the citizens of Independence began a local fundraising drive to purchase a site for a proposed state fish hatchery. $1,500.00 was raised, and a 40-acre (16 ha) site was purchased on Oak Creek, just north of the town. Fish and Game Commissioner M. J. Connell instructed the design team led by Charles Dean of the State Department of Engineering "to design a building that would match the mountains, would last forever, and would be a showplace for all time". The architectural style they chose is Tudor Revival. Construction began in March, 1916, with a final budget of approximately $60,000.00. The walls of the building are constructed using 3,500 short tons (3,200 t) of native granite collected within a quarter mile (400 m) of the site. The walls are two to three feet (600 to 900 mm) thick. The roof is red Spanish tile made in Lincoln, California.

== Operation ==
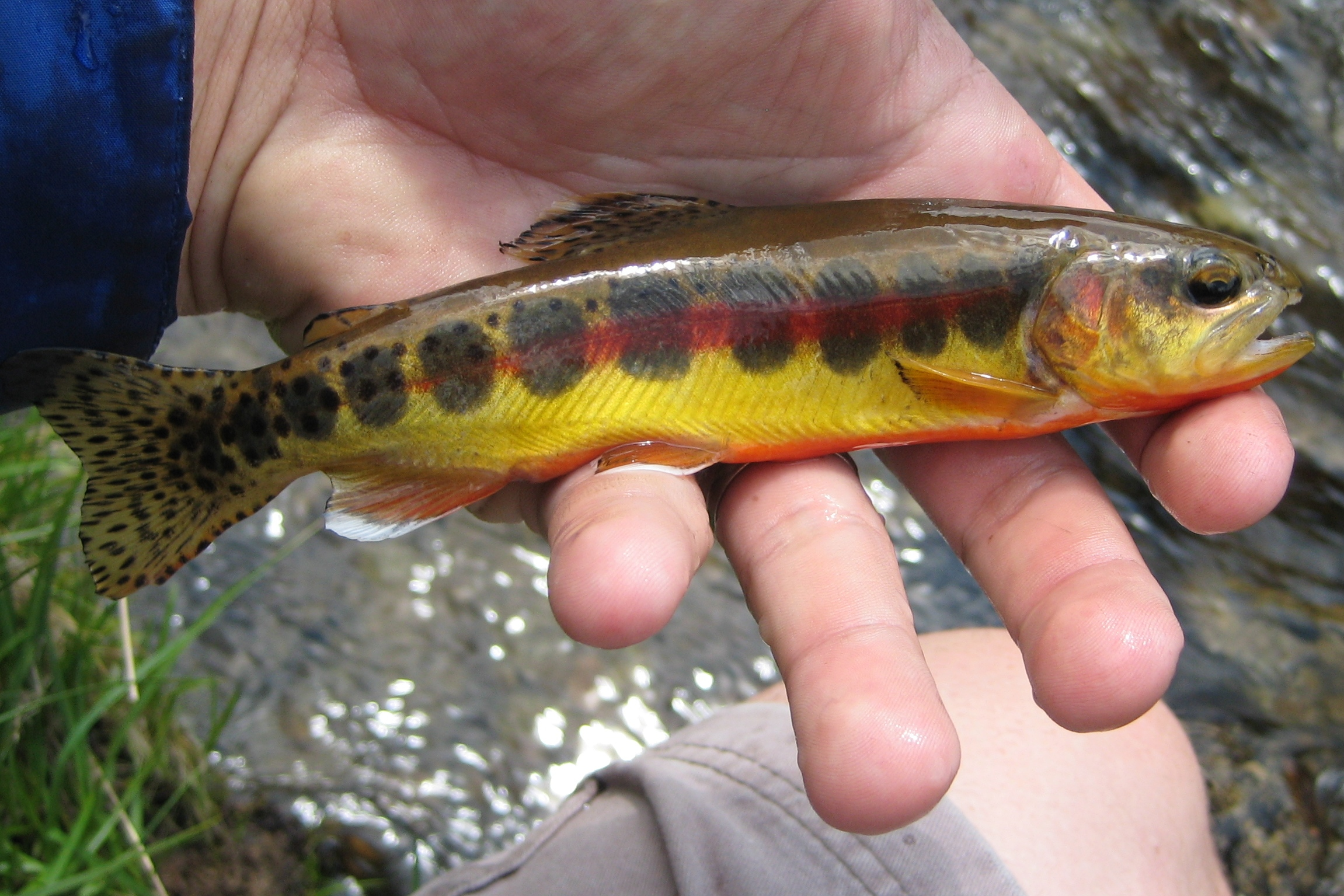
A golden trout, California's state fish, caught in the John Muir Wilderness

When construction was completed in 1917, it was the largest and best equipped hatchery in California and could produce 2,000,000 fish fry per year. Initially, fish eggs were collected from the Rae Lakes and were transported to the hatchery by mule train. Since 1918, golden trout eggs have been collected from the Cottonwood Lakes. This program is the sole source of California golden trout eggs, currently operated by the nearby Black Rock Fish Hatchery since the closure of Mt Whitney Hatchery in 2008.

In July 1931, the Mount Whitney Fish Hatchery and the Colorado Fish Commission traded 30,000 Colorado River cutthroat trout eggs for 25,000 golden trout eggs. The resulting Colorado cutthroat fry were planted in remote High Sierra lakes at very high elevations. Over the following 50 years, the population in Colorado became endangered due to habitat destruction and interbreeding with other species of trout. The cutthroats now living in California remained pure. In 1987, California and Colorado cooperated to transplant 50 genetically pure cutthroats back to a remote lake in Rocky Mountain National Park, where they thrived.

== Proposed closure ==
In 1996, the California Department of Fish and Game proposed closing the hatchery due to budget cuts. Local and statewide opposition to the closure developed, and a plan was approved to save the facility in order to "provide the public with an interpretation of the historical significance of the hatchery, knowledge of the hatchery's function and an understanding of our natural resources". Legislation was passed designating the "Friends of the Mt. Whitney Fish Hatchery" as a private group authorized to lease part of the hatchery in order to maintain and preserve it, in coordination with the State Office of Historic Preservation.

== Wildfire and mudslide ==
On July 5, 2007, a 55,000-acre (22,000 ha) wildfire burned upstream to the west of the Mount Whitney Fish Hatchery. A year later on July 12, 2008, a heavy thunderstorm caused a massive mudslide in the fire-scarred Oak Creek watershed that swept downstream, severely damaging the ponds and water supplies of the hatchery, as well as two employee housing units. The main building escaped major damage. The Friends of the Mt. Whitney Fish Hatchery organized restoration work that allowed the interpretive center and display pond to re-open on May 30, 2009.

The first group of fish to come out of the hatchery in three years were planted in Diaz Lake, and a Kids Fishing Day was held in May, 2010. An expanded interpretive center was planned.

== Land transfer to California tribe ==
On November 29, 2023, the California Department of Fish and Wildlife (CDFW) announced that more than 40 acres (16 ha) of the Mount Whitney Fish Hatchery land will be transferred to Fort Independence Indian Community. This is the first ever land transfer by CDFW to a California tribe. The no-cost transfer, to be completed early 2024, was approved the prior week by the Wildlife Conservation Board following years of discussion.

The land includes the fish hatchery structures and native habitat. CDFW Director Charlton H. Bonham noted that the land transfer "honors Governor Newsom’s Executive Order encouraging the transfer of excess lands to California Native American tribes and it is a Nature Based Solution that contributes to the goals of 30x30.”

Indigenous Paiute members settled in the area since time immemorial, and Tribal Chairman Carl Dahlberg responded to the land transfer announcement saying, "This property is inextricably intwined into who we are as Paiute people and we hope to bring this knowledge and history back to the community through the preservation of the Mount Whitney Fish Hatchery.”

== See also ==
- Golden Trout Wilderness
