= Eastern Sierra Institute for Collaborative Education =

ESICE Eastern Sierra Institute for Collaborative Education (ESICE) is a 501 (C)(3) nonprofit that was incorporated in 1997 and creates educational opportunities for people of all ages. The Institute is based at the University of California White Mountain Research Station. ESICE focuses on improved communication of scientific information to the public. ESICE provides a range of innovative educational programs that focus on collaborative approaches to life sciences, environment, and social issues.

== Programs ==
The Eastern Sierra Institute for Collaborative Education is a non-profit organization that supports innovative education collaboration to address real-world environmental and social issues.

=== Eastern Sierra Watershed Project ===
ESICE programs include the Eastern Sierra Watershed Project, an experiential education program for elementary and middle school students to learn about unique Eastern Sierra ecosystems and natural resources. The program applies required science studies to real-life situations, such as the historic re-watering of the Lower Owens River. In the program, students collect scientific data, and they approximate changes in the river ecosystems based on the data they collected.

=== Roadside Heritage ===
ESICE also conceived, developed, and brought about the implementation of the Roadside Heritage program, which engages middle school students in collecting interviews with knowledgeable citizens, and research to create high-quality audio programs for motorists traveling through the region.

== Partners ==
The institute partners with a variety of government agencies, non-profits, academic organizations, and corporations.
