= Inyo County Courthouse =

- U.S. National Register of Historic Places
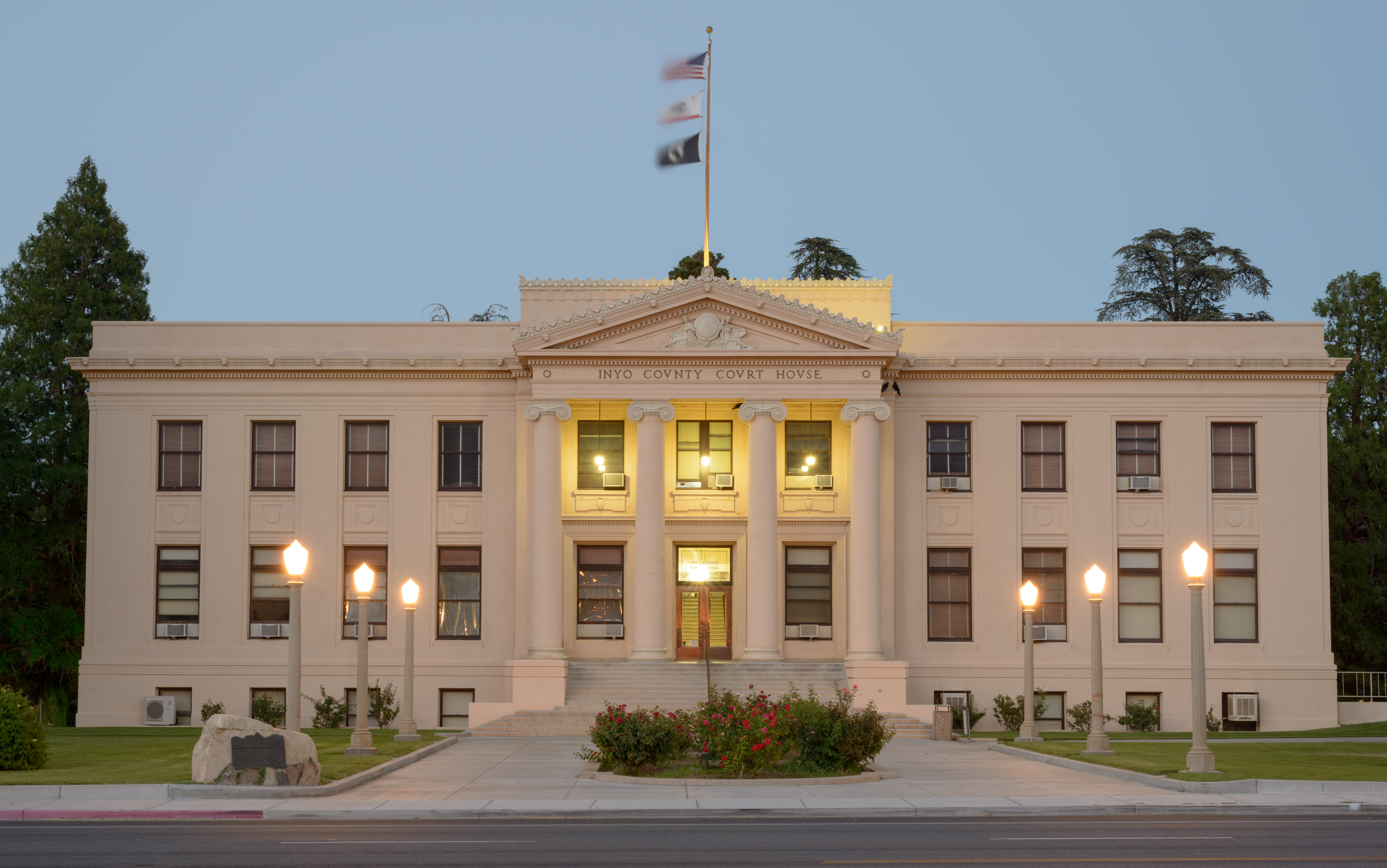

- Location within California Location within the United States
- Location: 168 N. Edwards St., Independence, California
- Coordinates: 36°48′13″N 118°11′56″W
- Area: 1.5 acres (0.61 ha)
- Built: 1921–1922
- Built by: McCombs, William & Paul Daniel
- Architect: Weeks, William H.
- Architectural style: Classical Revival
- NRHP reference No.: 97001664
- Added to NRHP: January 23, 1998

The Inyo County Courthouse, on N. Edwards St. in Independence, California, was designed by architect William H. Weeks in Classical Revival style, and was built in 1922. It was listed on the National Register of Historic Places in 1998.

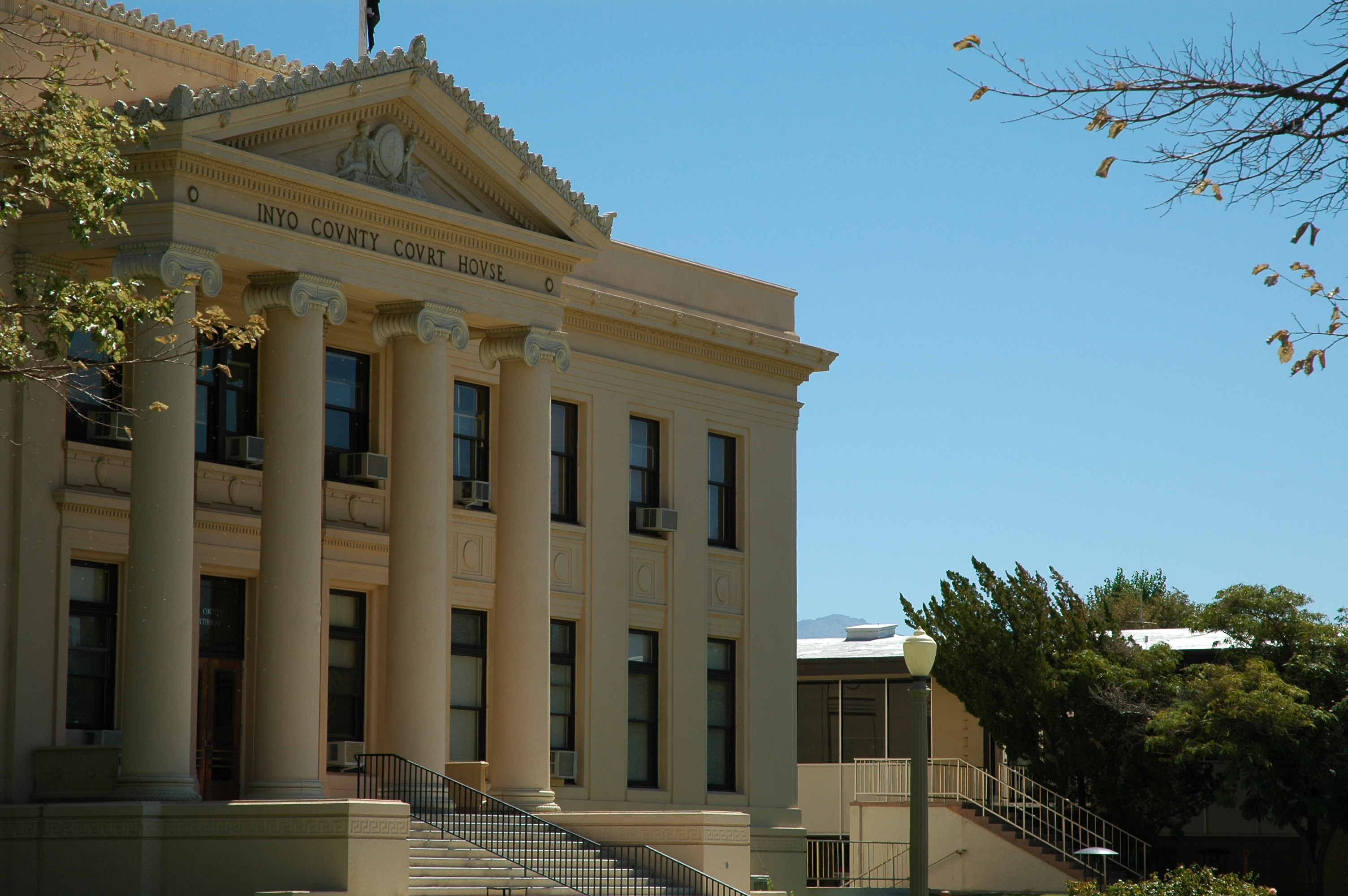

It is significant for association with "economic and political development" of the Owens Valley and for housing county government during 1921–1947. It is the only example of "monumental, Neo-Classical Revival architecture" in the Owens Valley area. According to its NRHP nomination "This elaborately designed building represents the peak of local autonomy in the Owens Valley, before the City of Los Angeles purchased the majority of land in the valley, including most of the land within the county seat. Water development policies adopted by the City of Los Angeles after 1924 led ultimately to the destruction of irrigated agriculture, and the virtual depopulation of the Owens Valley."

The courthouse cornerstone was laid down in 1922. It was the fourth courthouse of the county, and replaced a version that was too small and was torn down after the present courthouse was built. Weeks was very experienced as an architect; he had designed more than 1,000 buildings already by 1915.

Charles Manson was held at the Inyo County Court House in October of 1969. 23 members of his Manson Family were also held at the Inyo County Courthouse from October to December in 1969. Manson and others were officially charged with the Tate and LaBianca murders before being transported to Los Angeles County.

A 2009 feasibility study for the building of new courthouse facilities identifies the building as inadequate for modern purposes, being deficient in terms of security and Americans with Disabilities Act (ADA) accessibility. It notes the court has been obliged to offer court services in leased annex space a half-mile away, to provide a minimally ADA accessible location for some court proceedings. A facilities planning site of the state of California identifies the potential project as having authorization to proceed with site acquisition, but no budget for development until at least 2014–15.
