= Independence, California =

Independence
- Unincorporated Community; Census-designated place
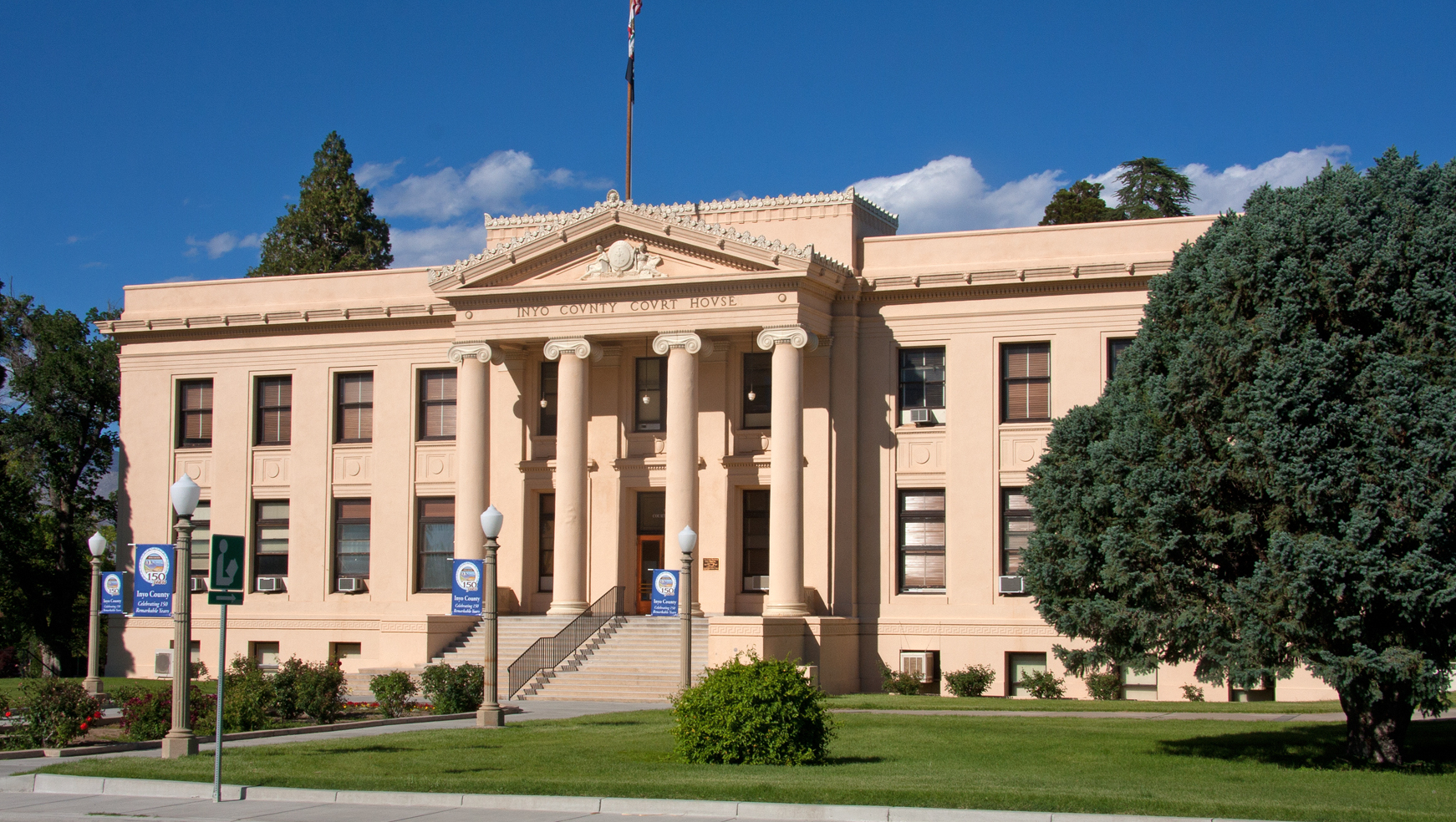
- Inyo County Courthouse
- Interactive map of Independence
- Location in the United States
- Coordinates: 36°49′39″N 118°12′48″W
- Country: United States
- State: California
- County: Inyo

Area
  - Total: 4.864 sq mi (12.597 km^{2})
  - Land: 4.861 sq mi (12.590 km^{2})
  - Water: 0.0027 sq mi (0.007 km^{2}) 0.057%
- Elevation: 3,904 ft (1,190 m)

Population (2020)
  - Total: 593
  - Density: 122/sq mi (47.1/km^{2})
- Time zone: UTC-8 (Pacific (PST))
  - Summer (DST): UTC-7 (PDT)
- ZIP Code: 93526
- Area codes: 442/760
- FIPS code: 06-36350
- GNIS feature ID: 2408418

Independence is an unincorporated census-designated place in and the county seat of Inyo County, California. Independence is located 41 miles (66 km) south-southeast of Bishop, at an elevation of 3930 feet (1198 m). The population of this census-designated place was 593 at the 2020 census, down from 669 at the 2010 census.

== Geography ==
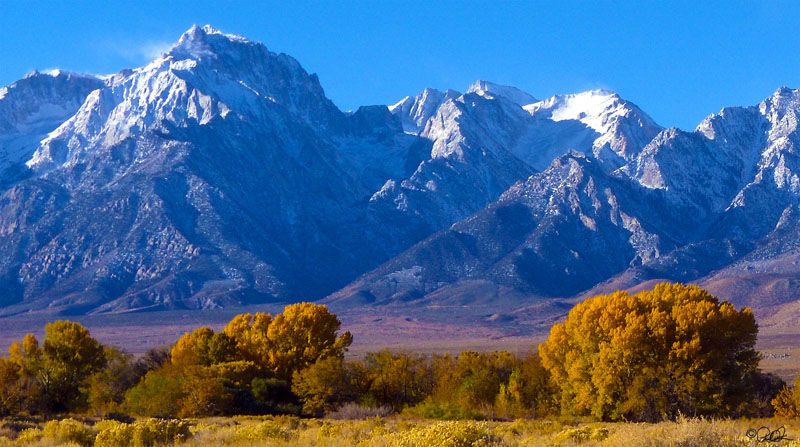
Mount Williamson (14,375 feet or 4,382 metres), one of the spectacular peaks of the John Muir Wilderness, from near the Independence Airport

The small town of Independence is bisected by U.S. Route 395, the main north–south highway through the Owens Valley.

The Sierra Nevada mountains to the west lie within the John Muir Wilderness Area. Onion Valley, one of the principal entry routes to the John Muir Wilderness, is accessed via the Onion Valley road which heads directly west out of Independence. This trail takes hikers to Kings Canyon/Sequoia National Parks which protect the Sierra Nevada west of the divide between the Owens Valley on the east and the rivers which drain into the San Joaquin Valley to the west.

Independence is a popular resupply location for hikers trekking the 2,650 mile long Pacific Crest Trail which extends from the Mexican border to Canada along the crest of the Sierra Nevada and Cascade Ranges. The highest pass along the entire trail, 13,153 foot (4009 m) Forester Pass, is directly west of Independence.

This granite monolith, The Winnedumah-Paiute Monument, rises prominently from the crest of the Inyo Mountains east of Independence.

According to the United States Census Bureau, Independence covers an area of 4.9 square miles (13 km^{2}), over 99% of it land.

The elevation of Independence is 3,925 feet (1,196 m) above sea level.

== Climate ==
Independence, like most of the Owens Valley, has a high cool arid climate (Köppen BWk) with hot summers and cool winters. January temperatures range from an average high of 54.0 °F (12.2 °C) to an average low of 27.4 °F (−2.6 °C). July temperatures range from an average high of 97.6 °F (36.4 °C) to an average low of 63.9 °F (17.7 °C). The highest recorded temperature was 115 °F (46.1 °C) in June 2017. The lowest recorded temperature was −5 °F (−20.6 °C) on January 9, 1937. There are an average of 97.7 afternoons annually with highs of 90 °F (32.2 °C) or higher and an average of 88.1 mornings with lows of 32 °F (0 °C) or less. Annual precipitation averages only 5.42 inches (138 mm). The most precipitation in one month was 10.71 inches (272.0 mm) in January 1969. The most precipitation in 24 hours was 5.27 inches (133.9 mm) on December 6, 1966. Snowfall varies greatly from year to year, averaging only 5.5 inches or 0.14 meters.

Climate data for Independence, California (1991–2020 normals, extremes 1893–2018)
| Month | Jan | Feb | Mar | Apr | May | Jun | Jul | Aug | Sep | Oct | Nov | Dec | Year |
|---|---|---|---|---|---|---|---|---|---|---|---|---|---|
| Record high °F (°C) | 80 (27) | 86 (30) | 98 (37) | 102 (39) | 105 (41) | 115 (46) | 114 (46) | 110 (43) | 108 (42) | 99 (37) | 93 (34) | 77 (25) | 115 (46) |
| Mean daily maximum °F (°C) | 57.7 (14.3) | 61.4 (16.3) | 69.2 (20.7) | 75.9 (24.4) | 85.4 (29.7) | 96.2 (35.7) | 102.1 (38.9) | 100.9 (38.3) | 92.7 (33.7) | 80.7 (27.1) | 67.4 (19.7) | 56.6 (13.7) | 78.9 (26.1) |
| Daily mean °F (°C) | 43.8 (6.6) | 47.2 (8.4) | 53.9 (12.2) | 60.0 (15.6) | 69.0 (20.6) | 79.2 (26.2) | 84.7 (29.3) | 82.9 (28.3) | 75.5 (24.2) | 64.1 (17.8) | 51.7 (10.9) | 42.7 (5.9) | 62.9 (17.2) |
| Mean daily minimum °F (°C) | 30.0 (−1.1) | 33.1 (0.6) | 38.6 (3.7) | 44.1 (6.7) | 52.5 (11.4) | 62.2 (16.8) | 67.2 (19.6) | 64.9 (18.3) | 58.2 (14.6) | 47.6 (8.7) | 36.0 (2.2) | 28.8 (−1.8) | 46.9 (8.3) |
| Record low °F (°C) | −5 (−21) | 2 (−17) | 14 (−10) | 21 (−6) | 27 (−3) | 32 (0) | 43 (6) | 44 (7) | 33 (1) | 22 (−6) | 11 (−12) | −2 (−19) | −5 (−21) |
| Average precipitation inches (mm) | 1.36 (35) | 0.93 (24) | 0.74 (19) | 0.18 (4.6) | 0.13 (3.3) | 0.13 (3.3) | 0.11 (2.8) | 0.15 (3.8) | 0.11 (2.8) | 0.24 (6.1) | 0.47 (12) | 0.87 (22) | 5.42 (138) |
| Average precipitation days (≥ 0.01 in) | 4.2 | 4.6 | 2.1 | 1.4 | 1.3 | 0.9 | 1.8 | 1.1 | 1.3 | 1.2 | 2.0 | 3.8 | 25.7 |
Source 1: NOAA
Source 2: xmACIS2

== History ==
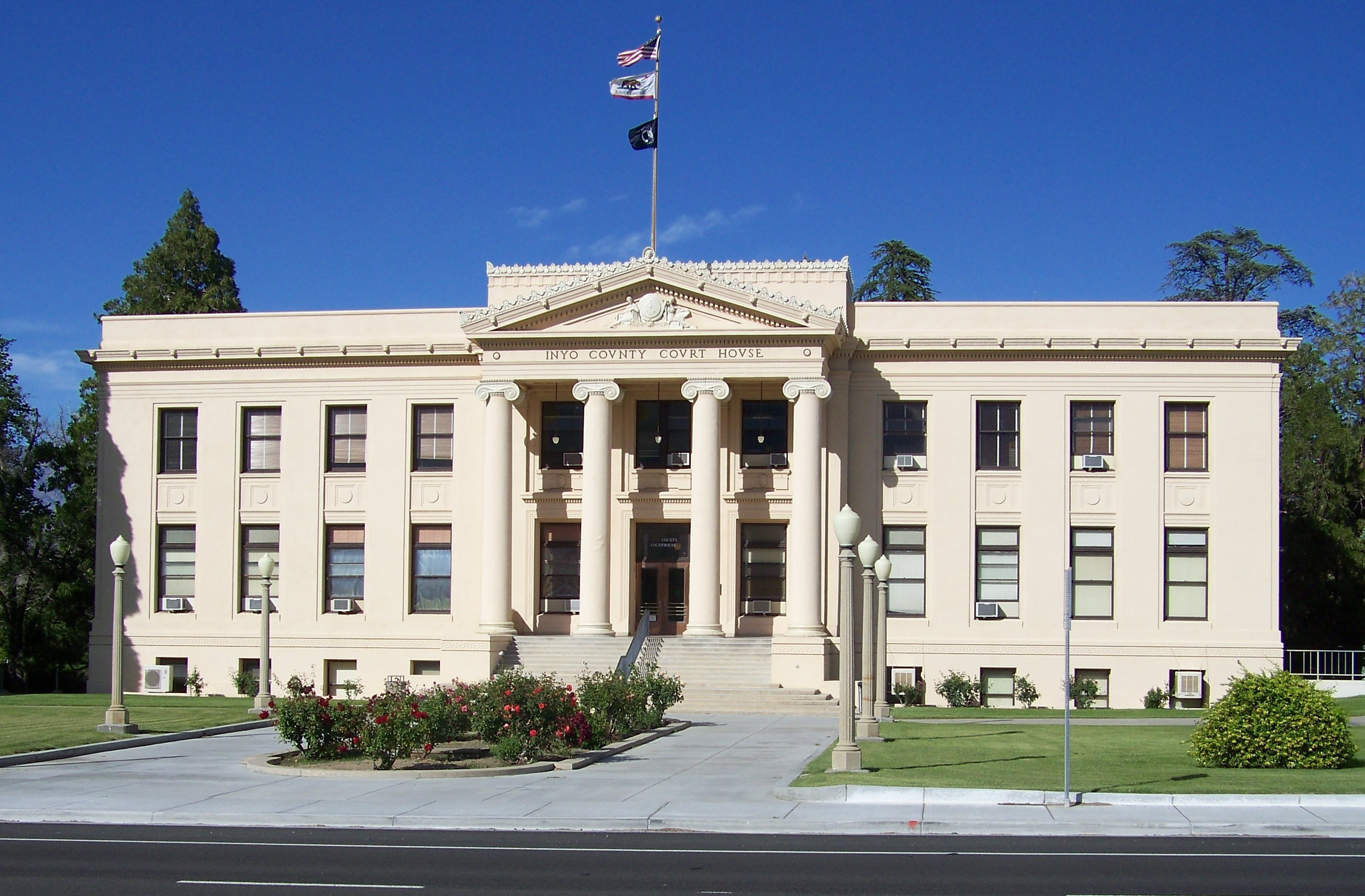
The Inyo County Courthouse (designed by W. H. Weeks, completed in 1921) in Independence

Charles Putnam founded a trading post at the site in 1861. It became known as Putnam's, and later Little Pine from the Little Pine Creek. The site of Putnam's Cabin, across the street from the Inyo County Courthouse, is a California Historical Landmark # 223.

Independence began as the US Army Camp Independence (two miles north of the current town) established by Lieutenant Colonel George S. Evans on July 4, 1862. Colonel Evans established the camp at the request of local settlers who feared hostilities from the local indigenous tribes. The camp was soon closed, but was re-established as Fort Independence when hostilities resumed in 1865. The fort was finally abandoned in 1877, and it is currently a reservation for the Fort Independence Indian Community of Paiute Indians.

Independence became the seat of Inyo County in 1866 when its chief competitor for the honor, a mining camp called Kearsarge, disappeared under an avalanche.

The first post office at Independence was established in 1866.

United States Army General John K. Singlaub (1921 – 2022) was born in Independence.

=== Museums ===
The Eastern California Museum with extensive collections, exhibits, and programs; is located at 155 North Grant Street in Independence.

The home of author Mary Austin, the author of The Land of Little Rain, is preserved as a museum located at 235 Market Street in Independence.

=== Library ===
The Inyo County Free Library is in the Inyo County Courthouse.

== Demographics ==
Historical population
| Census | Pop. | Note | %± |
|---|---|---|---|
| 2000 | 574 | | — |
| 2010 | 669 | | 16.6% |
| 2020 | 593 | | −11.4% |
U.S. Decennial Census; 1860–1870 1880-1890; 1900 1910 1920; 1930 1940 1950; 1960 1970 1980; 1990 2000 2010

Independence first appeared as a census-designated place in the 2000 U.S. census.

=== Racial and ethnic composition ===
Independence CDP, California – Racial and ethnic composition Note: the US Census treats Hispanic/Latino as an ethnic category. This table excludes Latinos from the racial categories and assigns them to a separate category. Hispanics/Latinos may be of any race.
| Race / Ethnicity (NH = Non-Hispanic) | Pop 2000 | Pop 2010 | Pop 2020 | % 2000 | % 2010 | % 2020 |
|---|---|---|---|---|---|---|
| White alone (NH) | 492 | 448 | 375 | 85.71% | 66.97% | 63.24% |
| Black or African American alone (NH) | 0 | 6 | 1 | 0.00% | 0.90% | 0.17% |
| Native American or Alaska Native alone (NH) | 20 | 91 | 51 | 3.48% | 13.60% | 8.60% |
| Asian alone (NH) | 4 | 8 | 4 | 0.70% | 1.20% | 0.67% |
| Native Hawaiian or Pacific Islander alone (NH) | 5 | 1 | 1 | 0.87% | 0.15% | 0.17% |
| Other race alone (NH) | 2 | 2 | 7 | 0.35% | 0.30% | 1.18% |
| Mixed race or Multiracial (NH) | 10 | 20 | 69 | 1.74% | 2.99% | 11.64% |
| Hispanic or Latino (any race) | 41 | 93 | 85 | 7.14% | 13.90% | 14.33% |
| Total | 574 | 669 | 593 | 100.00% | 100.00% | 100.00% |

=== 2020 ===
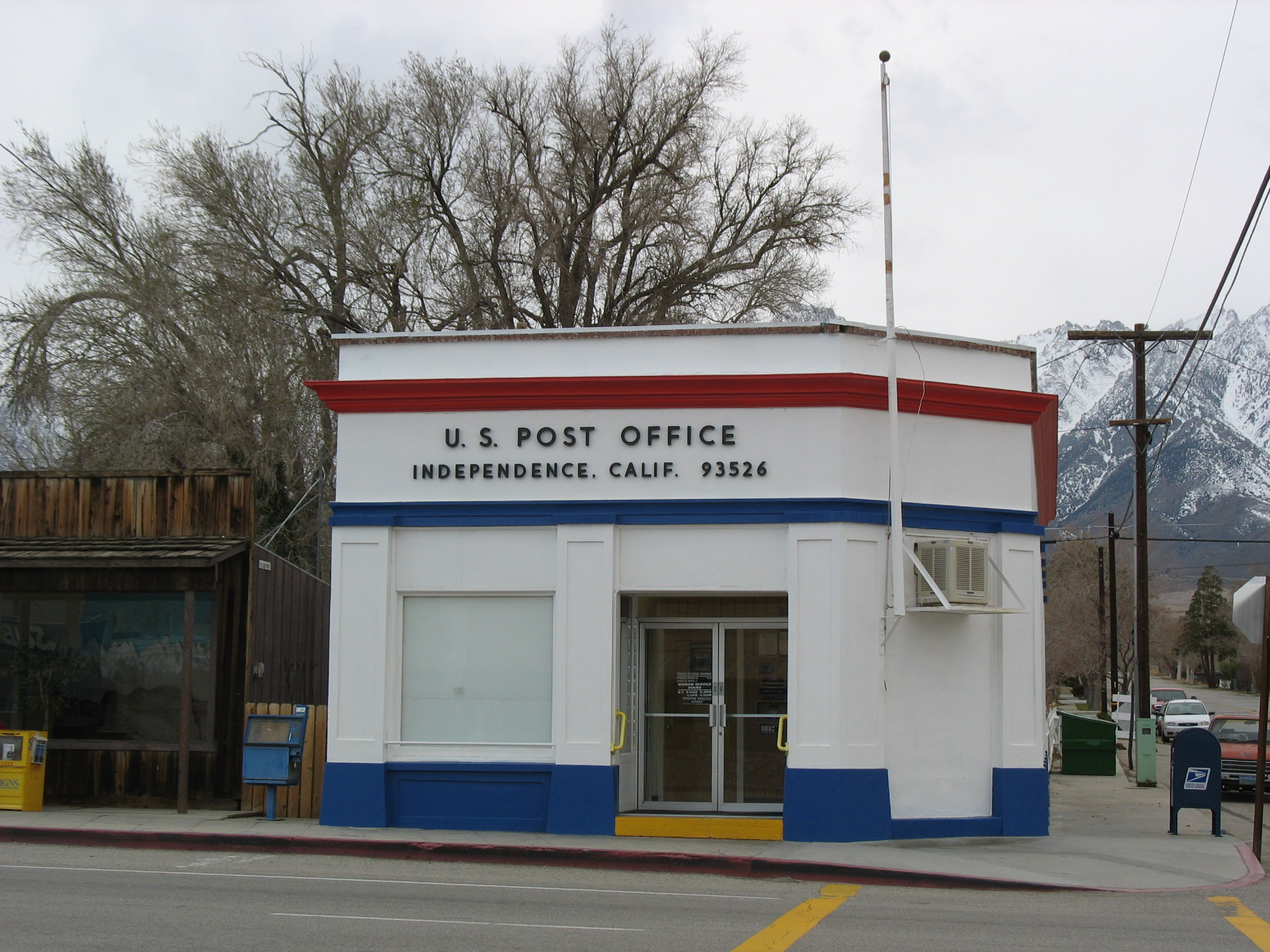
Independence, California Post Office

The 2020 United States census reported that Independence had a population of 593. The population density was 122.0 inhabitants per square mile (47.1/km^{2}). The racial makeup of Independence was 395 (66.6%) White, 2 (0.3%) African American, 59 (9.9%) Native American, 4 (0.7%) Asian, 1 (0.2%) Pacific Islander, 28 (4.7%) from other races, and 104 (17.5%) from two or more races. Hispanic or Latino of any race were 85 persons (14.3%).

The census reported that 94.6% of the population lived in households and 32 people (5.4%) were institutionalized.

There were 284 households, out of which 64 (22.5%) had children under the age of 18 living in them, 100 (35.2%) were married-couple households, 12 (4.2%) were cohabiting couple households, 76 (26.8%) had a female householder with no partner present, and 96 (33.8%) had a male householder with no partner present. 109 households (38.4%) were one person, and 56 (19.7%) were one person aged 65 or older. The average household size was 1.98. There were 158 families (55.6% of all households).

The age distribution was 96 people (16.2%) under the age of 18, 44 people (7.4%) aged 18 to 24, 103 people (17.4%) aged 25 to 44, 188 people (31.7%) aged 45 to 64, and 162 people (27.3%) who were 65 years of age or older. The median age was 54.0 years. For every 100 females, there were 101.7 males.

There were 373 housing units at an average density of 76.7 units per square mile (29.6 units/km^{2}), of which 284 (76.1%) were occupied. Of these, 203 (71.5%) were owner-occupied, and 81 (28.5%) were occupied by renters.

== Politics ==
In the state legislature, Independence is in the 4th senatorial district, represented by Republican Marie Alvarado-Gil, and the 8th Assembly district, represented by Republican David Tangipa.

Independence is in California's 3rd congressional district, represented by Independent Kevin Kiley.

== Media ==
=== Film ===
The film set for Burt and Heather's house played by Michael Gross and Reba McEntire, in the 1990 movie, Tremors, directed by Ron Underwood, was built and filmed in the hills above Independence.

In the 1997 comedy film Trial and Error starring Michael Richards, Jeff Daniels, and Charlize Theron, Independence stood in as the fictional town of Paradise Bluff, Nevada. The film is centered around the Inyo County Courthouse. According to film historian Charles Morfin, "the Pines Café, one of the oldest buildings in Independence, is observed in various scenes. It was used as a hotel bar, a café and as a hotel lobby." Interior hotel scenes were shot in the Winnedumah Hotel and Pioneer Methodist Church. A hotel facade (used for exterior shots) was erected next to the Mt. Williamson Hotel, and was torn down after shooting. A number of Independence residents were recruited to act as extras in the film.

Portions of Daft Punk's 2006 film Electroma were filmed in Independence. The avant-garde film centers around two robots on a road trip throughout the American west; scenes shot in Independence involve the main characters being given wax faces by mysterious figures. Scenes from that particular part of the movie were later re-used in the band's 2026 music video for their song "Human After All".

=== Radio ===
KSRW-FM 92.5 broadcasts from Independence. Another radio station that use to broadcast from Independence was KINC/KNYO/KESR on 600 AM.

== Education ==
It is in the Owens Valley Unified School District for grades PK-12.

== See also ==
- Big Pine volcanic field
- Carson and Colorado Railway
- Roadside Heritage - of the Eastern Sierra
- Owens Valley
- Manzanar
- Mount Whitney Fish Hatchery
