= University Peak (California) =

Mountain in California, United States

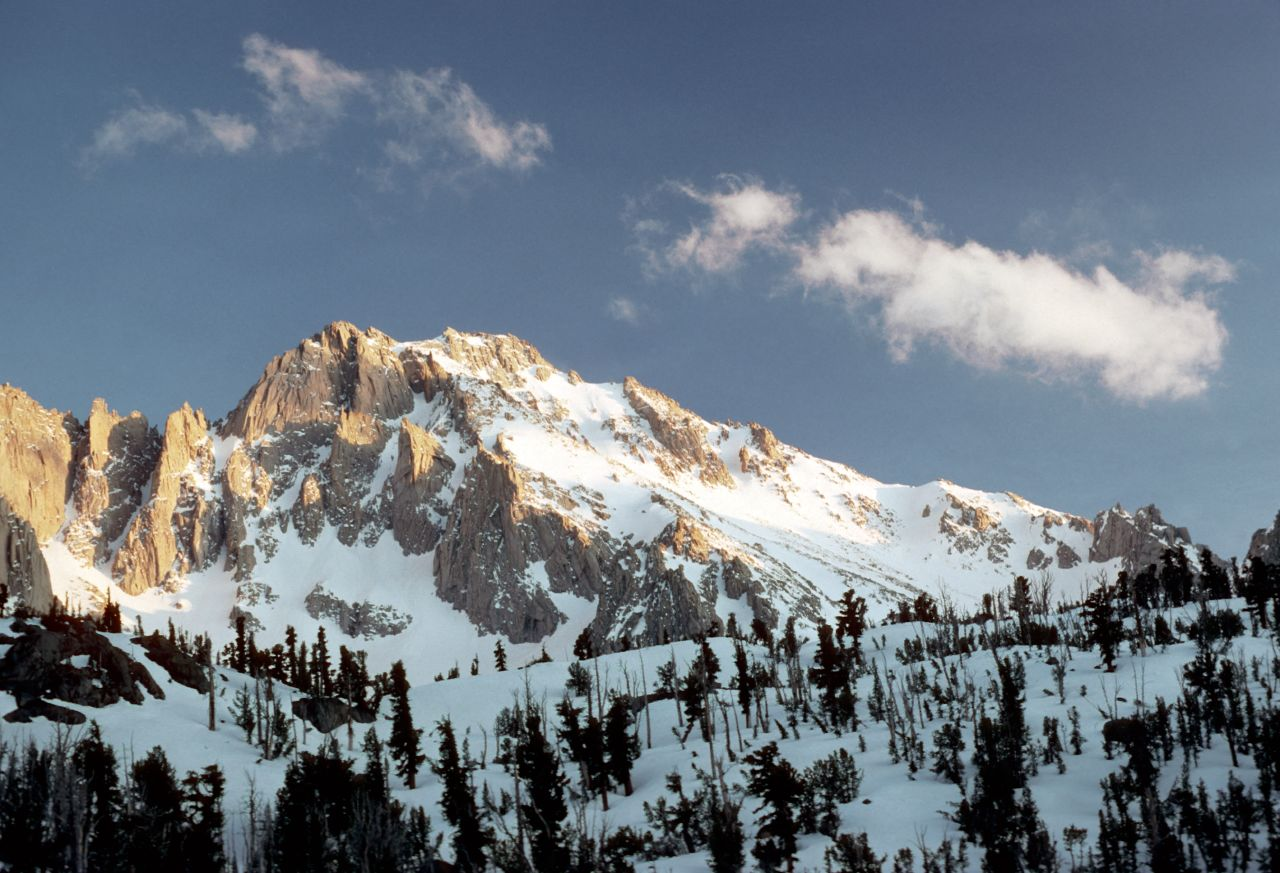
- University Peak from the northeast, March 2006.

Highest point
- Elevation: 13,595 ft (4,144 m) NAVD 88
- Prominence: 1,187 ft (362 m)
- Parent peak: Mount Keith
- Listing: SPS Mountaineers peak; Western States Climbers Star peak; Vagmarken Club Sierra Crest List
- Coordinates: 36°44′53″N 118°21′43″W

Naming
- Etymology: University of California

Geography
- Location within California Location within the United States
- Location: Kings Canyon National Park; Inyo / Tulare counties, California, U.S.
- Parent range: Sierra Nevada
- Topo map: USGS Mount Williamson

Climbing
- First ascent: July 12, 1896 by J. N. Le Conte, Helen M. Gompertz, Belle J. Miller, Estelle Miller
- Easiest route: South Slopes, cross county hike

University Peak is a thirteener in the Sierra Nevada. It is named for the University of California. It is on the Sierra crest between Mount Gould to the north, and Mount Bradley to the south. It lies on the boundary between Tulare County and Inyo County. Its west side is in Kings Canyon National Park while the east face is in the John Muir Wilderness.

The nearest trailhead to University Peak is Onion Valley. The least technical route to its summit is an off-trail hike up the south slopes. It offers a variety of other routes from easy scrambles to rock climbing. The more challenging routes led the Sierra Club's Sierra Peaks Section to list University Peak as a Mountaineers Peak.
