= Rae Lakes =

Lake in the state of California, United States

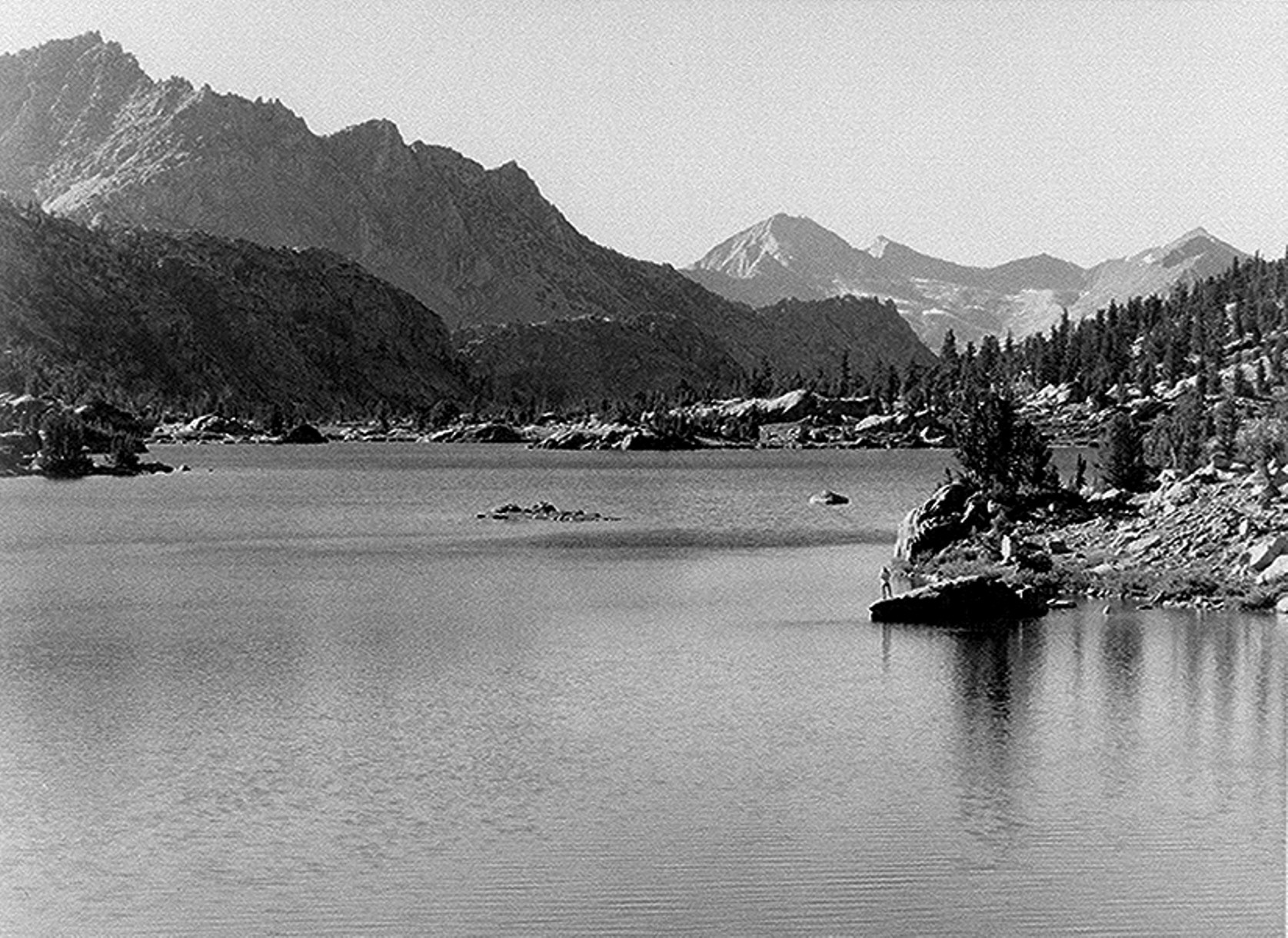
- "Rae Lake" by Ansel Adams, circa 1930s

- Location within California Location within the United States
- Location: Kings Canyon National Park, Fresno County, California, US
- Coordinates: 36°48′19″N 118°24′08″W
- Primary outflows: Woods Creek South Fork
- Basin countries: United States
- Surface elevation: 10,544 feet (3,214 m)

Rae Lakes is a series of lakes in the Sierra Nevada, located in Kings Canyon National Park, eastern Fresno County, California. The lakes are located on the John Muir Trail at the base of Black Mountain.

== See also ==
- List of lakes in California
