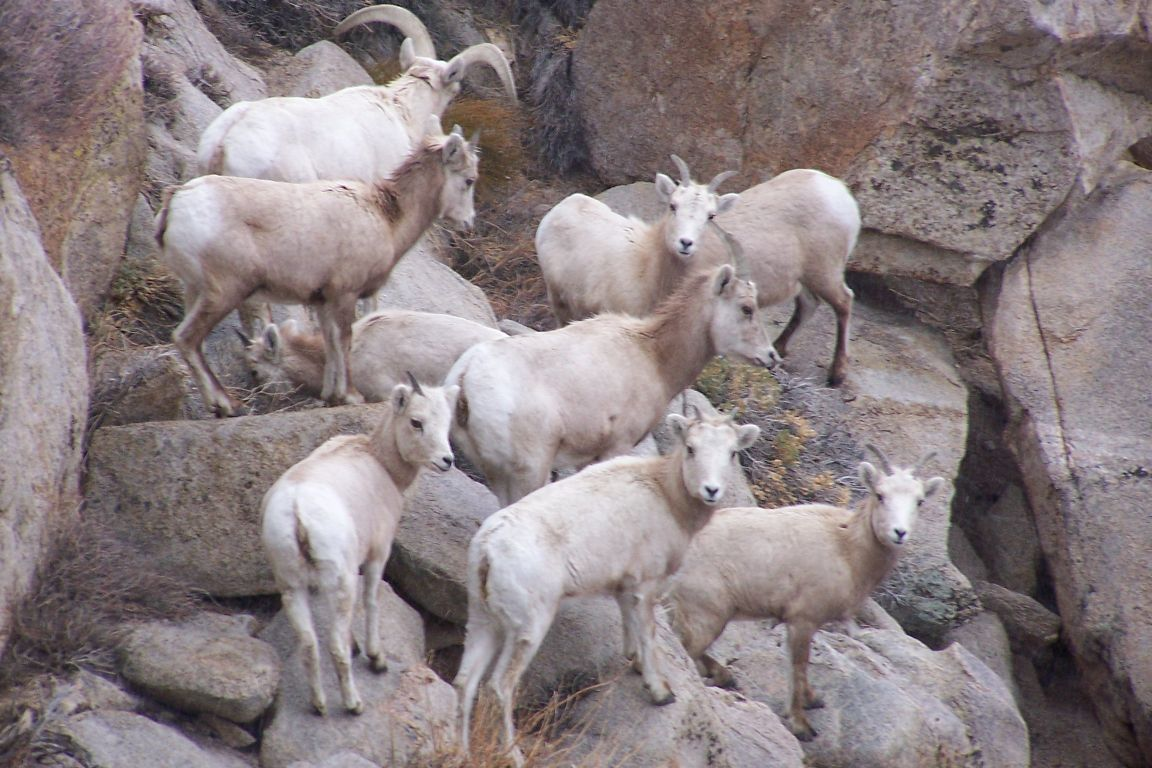
- Ewes and lambs on Wheeler Crest

Conservation status
- Imperiled (NatureServe)

- Endangered (ESA)

Scientific classification
- Kingdom: Animalia
- Phylum: Chordata
- Class: Mammalia
- Infraclass: Placentalia
- Order: Artiodactyla
- Family: Bovidae
- Subfamily: Caprinae
- Genus: Ovis
- Species: O. canadensis
- Subspecies: O. c. sierrae

Trinomial name
- Ovis canadensis sierrae (Grinnell, 1912)

= Sierra Nevada bighorn sheep =

Subspecies of bighorn sheep

The Sierra Nevada bighorn sheep (Ovis canadensis sierrae) is subspecies of bighorn sheep unique to the Sierra Nevada mountains of California. A 2016 genetics study confirmed significant divergence between the three subspecies of North America's bighorn sheep: Sierra Nevada bighorn sheep, Rocky Mountain bighorn sheep and desert bighorn sheep. Sierra Nevada bighorn sheep were listed as a federally endangered subspecies in 2000. In 2016, over 600 Sierra bighorn remained in the wild. In 2023, more recent studies indicate that the population has dropped to approximately half, or 300. This is due to high levels of mountain lion predation combined with heavy snowfall, threatening the species even further.

== Physical characteristics ==
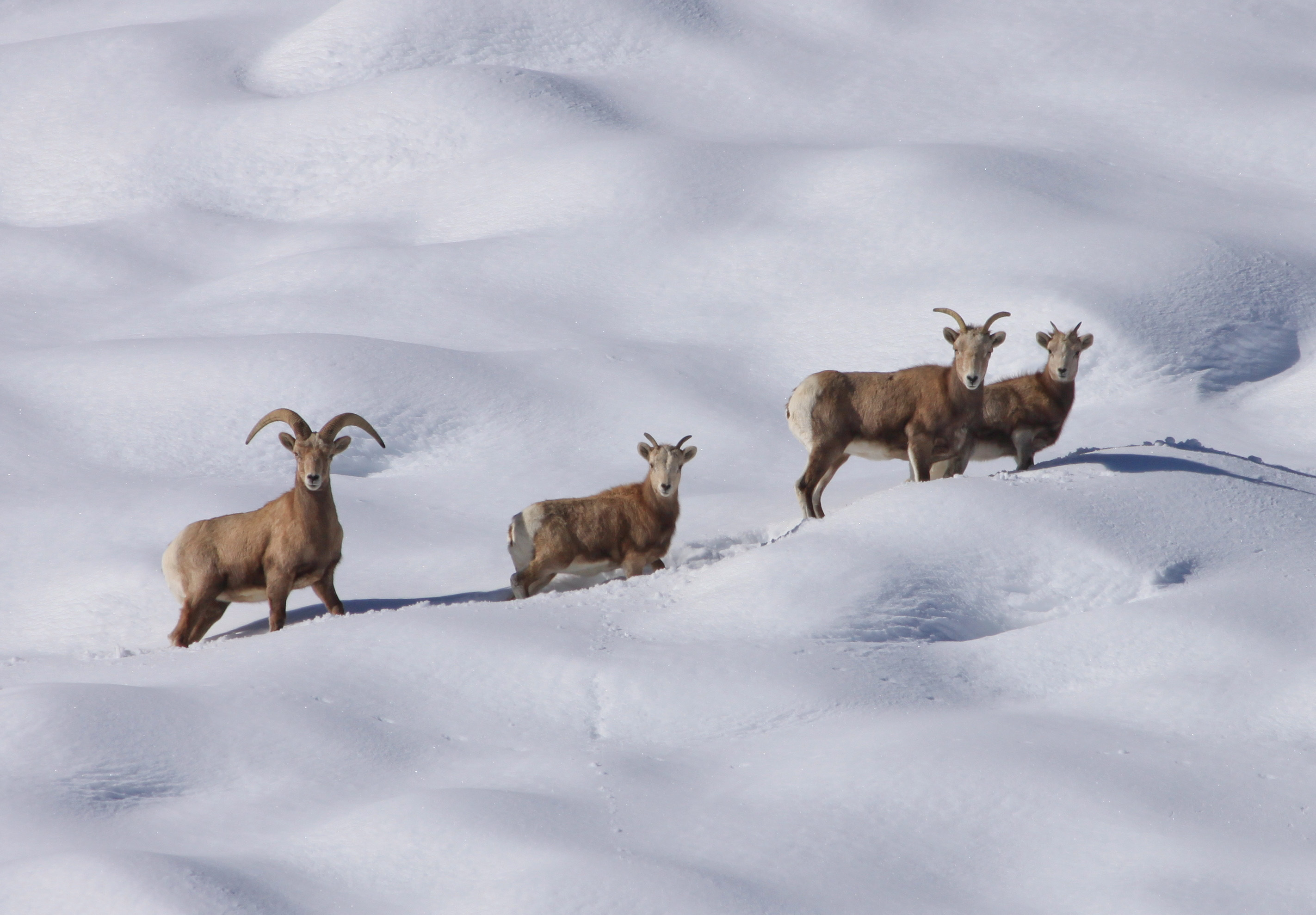
Ram and ewes

Sierra Nevada bighorn range in color from white to dark brown, with a white rump and dark tail. There is some seasonal change in coloration due to the shedding of a thicker winter layer. Specialized hooves with adhesive soles provide traction in steep rocky terrain. Female bighorn (ewes) can weigh up to 70 kilograms (155 lb) and have shorter, narrow horns, while male bighorn (rams) can weigh as much as 100 kilograms (220 lb) and have massive, curving horns. The horns of both rams and ewes are composed of a dense layer of keratin covering a core of bone. The Sierra Nevada bighorn sheep's specialized hooves are not only essential for navigating their rocky habitats but also play a crucial role in their mating rituals, where males engage in horn-clashing contests to establish dominance. Their horns, which grow continuously, add a new layer each year, creating distinct growth rings that can be used to estimate the animal's age.

The average lifespan for Sierra Nevada bighorn males and females has been observed as 8 to 12 years.

== Behavior ==
Sierra Nevada bighorn sheep are gregarious, with group size and composition depending on gender and season. Spatial segregation by gender occurs outside of the mating season. Bighorn sheep ewes generally remain with the same band in which they were born. Males older than two years of age remain apart from females and younger males for most of the year. During the late fall and winter, the groups come together and concentrate in suitable winter habitat. During this time, males compete for dominance with behaviors like horn clashes. Breeding takes place in late fall, generally November and December. Lambing occurs between late April and early July on safe, precipitous, rocky slopes; most lambs in the Sierra Nevada are born in May and June. Ewes and lambs often occupy steep terrain that provides a diversity of exposures and slopes for escape cover. Human activity, particularly hunting and habitat disturbance, has been observed to impact the behavior of Sierra Nevada bighorn sheep, causing them to become more wary and altering their movement patterns.

== Habitat ==
Sierra Nevada bighorn sheep inhabit portions of the Sierra Nevada located along the eastern boundary of California in Tuolumne, Mono, Fresno, Inyo, and Tulare Counties. Habitat occurs from the eastern base of the range as low as 4,790 feet (1,460 m) to peaks above 14,100 feet (4,300 m). Sierra bighorn inhabit open areas where the land is rocky, sparsely vegetated, and characterized by steep slopes and canyons. Wehausen provides a detailed description of Sierra bighorn habitat throughout their range. Bighorn prefer open ground with high visibility to better detect predators and allow enough time to reach steep, rocky areas (escape terrain). Forests and thick brush are usually avoided if possible.

Most bighorn live at elevations from 3,000–4,300 m (10,000–14,000 ft) in subalpine and alpine areas during the summer. During winter, some bighorn occupy high-elevation, windswept ridges, while others migrate to lower elevations to avoid deep snow and to find forage. While Sierra Nevada bighorn sheep are known to inhabit a broad range of elevations, they show a preference for certain types of terrain. For example, they often favor steep, rocky slopes which provide them with an advantage against predators.

== Cultural significance ==
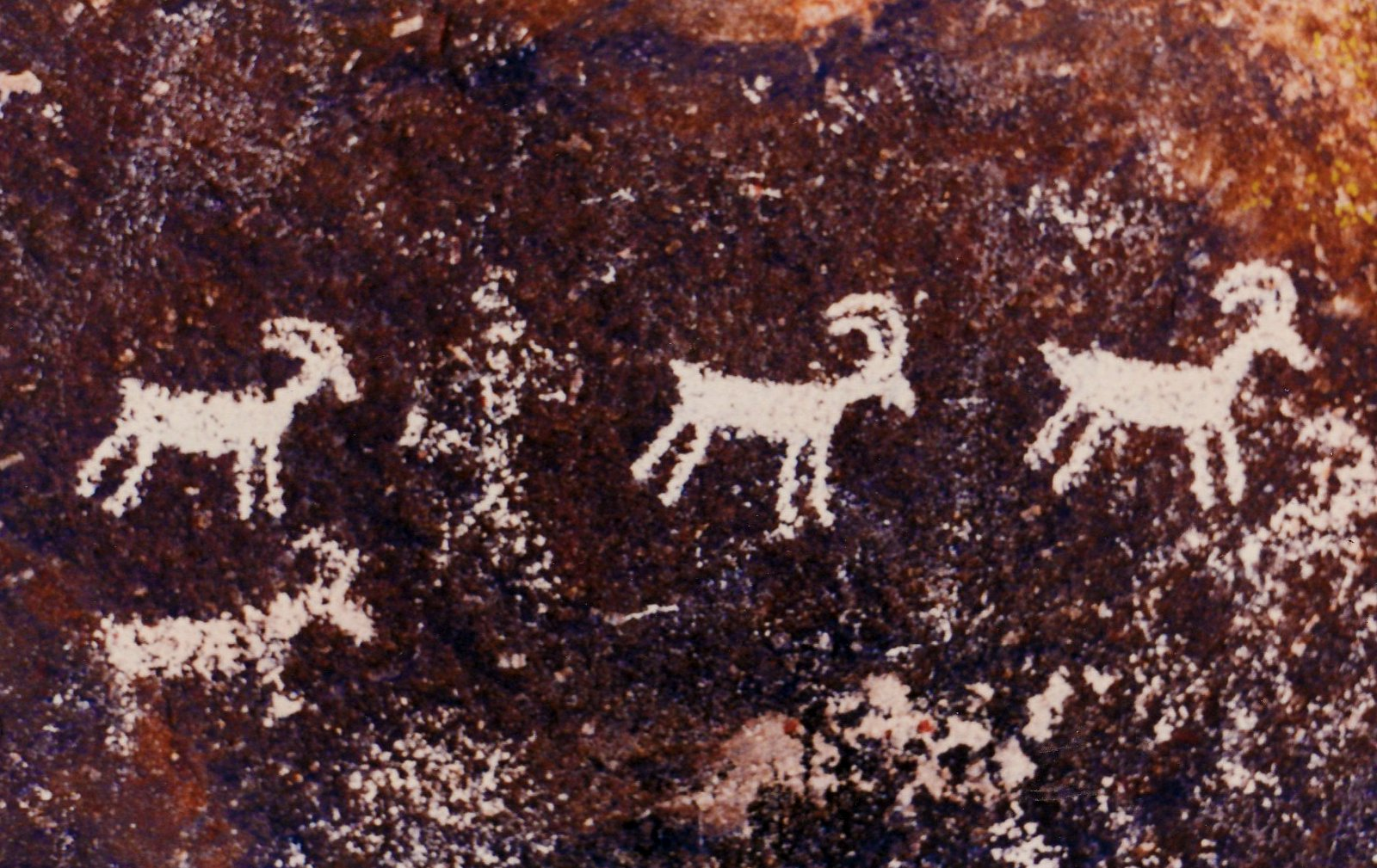
Bighorn sheep rock art

Bighorn sheep have significant cultural importance to the Indigenous communities of the Sierra Nevada region. They have been featured in traditional stories, art, and ceremonies, symbolizing strength and agility. The sheep also play a role in modern culture, appearing in children's literature and being recognized as symbols of various states. Many rock-art depictions of these majestic animals can be found throughout the Owens Valley, indicating their symbolic and utilitarian value in these cultures.

== Diet ==
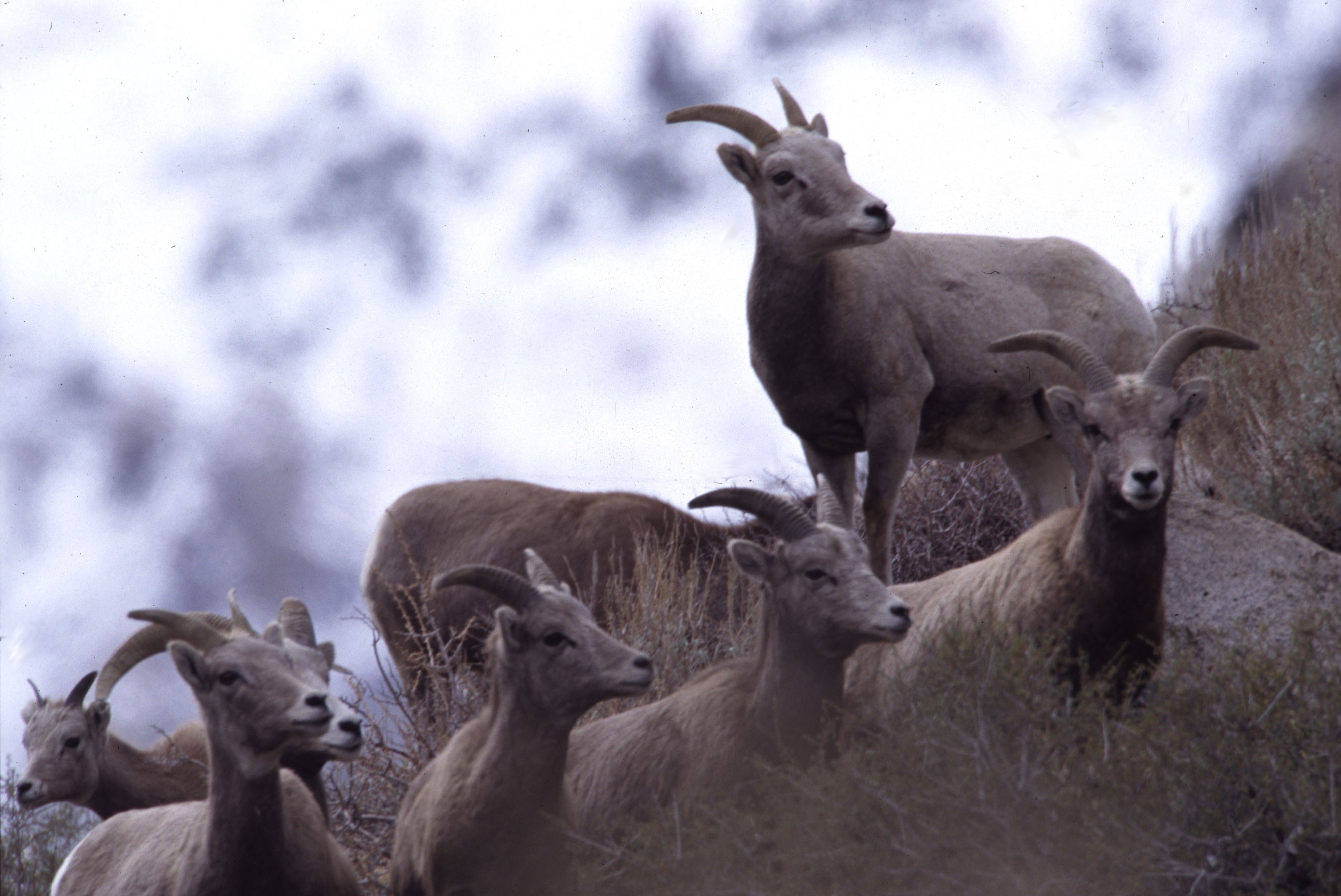
Herd at Wheeler Crest

Sierra bighorn are ruminant herbivores with four-chambered stomachs. Bighorn are primarily grazers, consuming various grasses, forbs, flowers, and roots depending on season and location. Naturally occurring mineral licks provide necessary minerals for bone and muscle growth.

== Species recovery ==
Centuries of unregulated hunting, disease outbreaks, and mountain lion predation took a heavy toll on the Sierra bighorn population. Human-induced threats include habitat loss due to development and climate change, hunting, and competition for food with domestic livestock. Disease played the largest role in the decline of the subspecies with domestic sheep transmitting virulent diseases, in particular pneumonia from Pasteurella, beginning in the 1870s. In 1999, CDFW was made the lead agency responsible for implementing Sierra bighorn recovery. A group of stakeholders drafted the Sierra Nevada Bighorn Sheep Recovery Plan, and CDFW formed the Sierra Nevada Bighorn Sheep Recovery Program to work toward the goals of the Recovery Plan. By the 1970s about 250 animals remained, occupying only two small areas of their former vast range. Translocations by the California Department of Fish and Wildlife (CDFW) helped to reestablish bighorn herds in historic habitat, but in spite of these efforts the population hit a low of about 100 total individuals in 1995. By the late 1990s, the population of Sierra Nevada bighorns had dwindled to around 125 individuals, with the Yosemite Herd accounting for 20 of these. In response to public concern, the U.S. Fish and Wildlife Service listed the Sierra Nevada bighorn sheep as endangered and the California legislature approved funding for a recovery plan. This plan involved the use of scientific methodologies and GPS satellite tracking for relocation efforts, which successfully increased the population of these sheep.

On January 3, 2000, Sierra bighorn were listed as a federally endangered subspecies. Conditions became particularly favorable for population growth, with the total number of individuals reaching about 250 by 2002. In 2014, fourteen Sierra Nevada bighorn sheep were flown to Big Arroyo in Sequoia National Park via helicopter to establish a population on the western side of the Sierra Crest. and about 600 in 2016. A 2016 genetics study confirmed significant divergence between the three subspecies of North America's bighorn sheep: Sierra Nevada bighorn sheep, Rocky Mountain bighorn sheep and desert bighorn sheep. In 2023, more recent studies indicate that the population has dropped to approximately half, or 300. This is due to high levels of mountain lion predation combined with heavy snowfall, threatening the species even further. The Recovery Program continues to monitor population growth, habitat use, and cause-specific mortality of Sierra bighorn, and to carry out augmentations and translocations in an effort to achieve recovery goals.
