= April 1976 =

Month of 1976

<<	April 1976					>>
Su	Mo	Tu	We	Th	Fr	Sa
				1	2	3
4	5	6	7	8	9	10
11	12	13	14	15	16	17
18	19	20	21	22	23	24
25	26	27	28	29	30

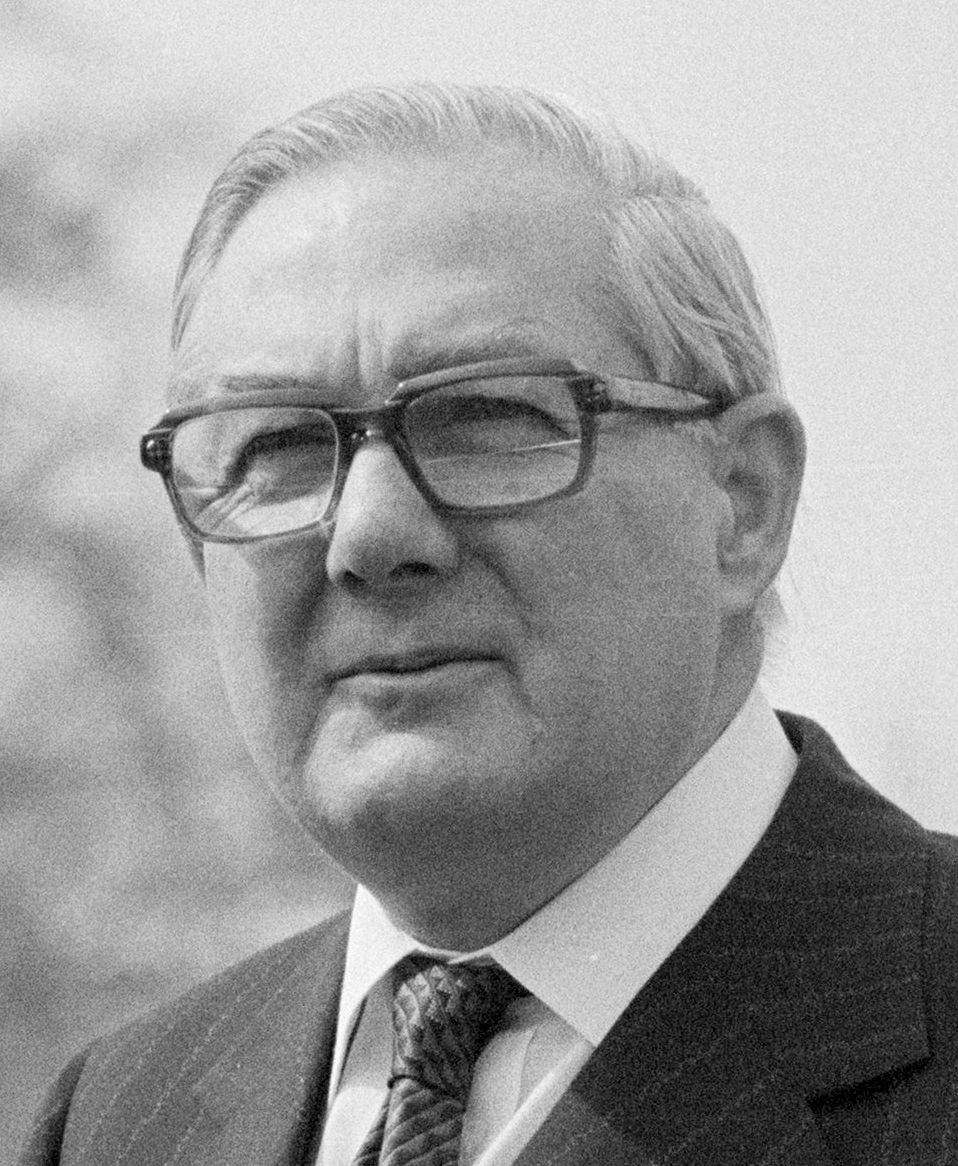
April 5, 1976: James Callaghan selected as the new Prime Minister of the United Kingdom

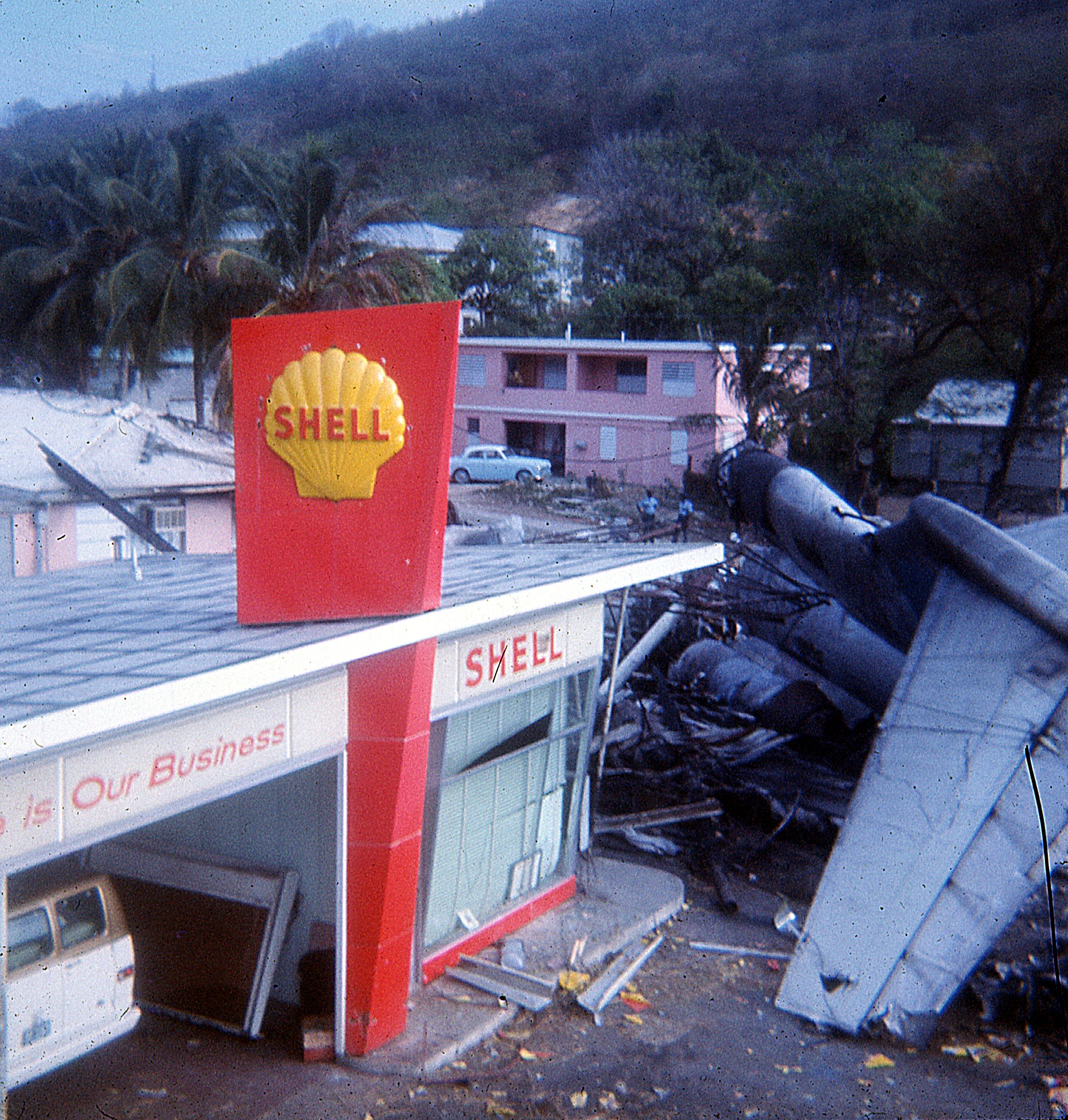
April 27, 1976: American Airlines Flight 625 overshoots runway, 37 people killed

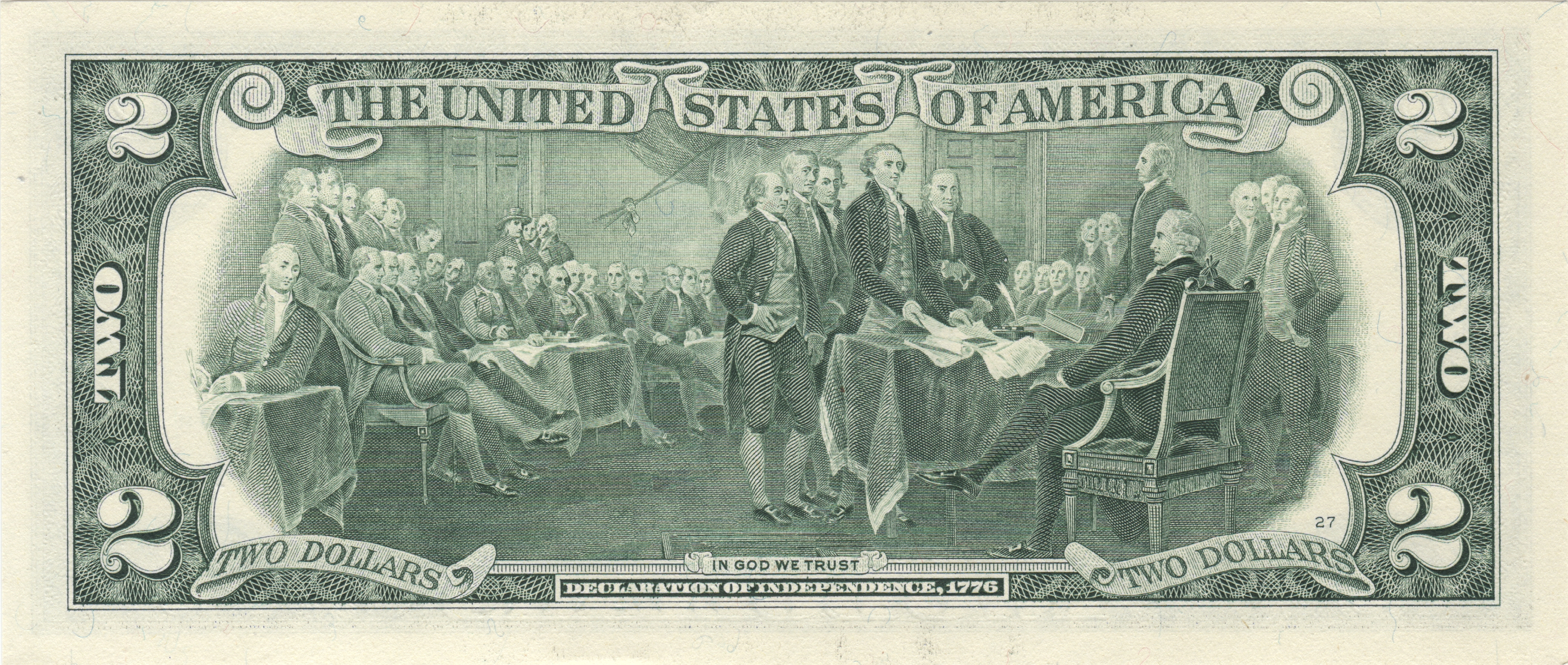
April 13, 1976: U.S. revives the $2 bill on Thomas Jefferson's birthday

The following events occurred in April 1976:

== April 1, 1976 (Thursday) ==
Apple logo

- Apple Computer Company was formed in the United States by Steve Jobs, Steve Wozniak and Ronald Wayne, in Cupertino, California. Wayne sold his 10 percent share in the company to Jobs and Wozniak eleven days later.
- Conrail (Consolidated Rails Corporation) began operations in the United States. It had been created by the U.S. government to take control of 13 major Class-1 railroads in the northeastern United States following bankruptcy proceedings.
- British astronomer Patrick Moore spoke on BBC Radio 2, on the subject of the "Jovian–Plutonian gravitational effect", an April Fool's Day hoax. Moore, a popular radio and television personality, told listeners that at 9:47 that morning, the alignment of Jupiter and Pluto would produce a combination of gravitational forces sufficient to decrease Earth's gravity for a moment and that if they jumped up and down at that moment, they would feel a sensation of floating. Moore's reputation was such that the BBC received hundreds of calls from listeners who said that they jumped in the air had noticed the non-existent effect.
- A mid-air collision was narrowly averted between two passenger jets that were carrying a total of 181 people at the airport in Spokane, Washington, when the pilot of Hughes Airwest Flight 5, a DC-9, was able to veer suddenly during his landing approach to avoid colliding with Northwest Airlines Flight 603, a DC-10 jumbo jet that had just departed the airport. The Northwest flight had 111 people on board when it was at an altitude of 3,500 feet (1,100 m) and encountered the faster-moving Hughes Airwest flight, and the two aircraft were within 20 feet (6.1 m) of each other before the disaster was averted.
- A cult following for The Rocky Horror Picture Show began with the inauguration of a regular midnight showing of the film at the Waverly Theatre in New York City, and audience participation with shouting at the characters on the screen and the use of props.
- The Canadian Radio-television and Telecommunications Commission becomes the regulator of Canadian television and radio.
- The New Zealand Fire Service was established, as a result of the New Zealand Fire Service Act (1975).
- Born: David Oyelowo, British actor, in Oxford, to Nigerian parents
- Died: Max Ernst, 84, German Dadaist and surrealist artist

== April 2, 1976 (Friday) ==
- Norodom Sihanouk resigned as Cambodia's head of state Sihanouk, the former King of Cambodia and head of state until 1970, had been retained as the nominal head of state while being kept under house arrest by the Khmer Rouge at the former royal palace after returning to Democratic Kampuchea in 1975 at the invitation of the nation's new Communist government. According to the state news agency broadcast made later, Sihanouk addressed the new 250-member People's Assembly and said in a speech, "I request the representatives of the people to allow me to retire— while remaining an ardent supporter of the Khmer Revolution, the democratic people, the Presidium and the Government." Prime Minister Khieu Samphan announced that Sihanouk would receive a pension and that "a large statue" would be erected in honor of the former leader. Sihanouk and the new government had a parting of ways after Sihanouk had witnessed conditions in the countryside.
- The Constitution of Portugal, endorsed by voters in a referendum on April 25, was proclaimed to be in effect, creating a parliamentary system and elections contested by candidates from multiple political parties.
- Jean Monnet of France became the first of only three people to receive the honor of Honorary Citizen of Europe, given by the European Council of the European Communities, now the European Union. Monnet had been instrumental in creating the European Coal and Steel Community (ECSC) of five nations in 1952, which became a model prior to the formation of the European Economic Community (or "Common Market") in 1957.
- In Vancouver, Washington, Douglas A. Wallace, a high priest in the Church of Jesus Christ of Latter-day Saints, ordained an African-American man, Larry Lester, as an Aaronic priest to challenge church doctrine that excluded black persons from serving as priests. The ordination was declared void because Wallace had not sought prior authorization for ordination of a person to the priesthood. The Church revises its policy in 1978.
- Born: Samoëla Rasolofoniaina, Malagasy popular folk music singer and songwriter; in Antananarivo, Madagascar

== April 3, 1976 (Saturday) ==
- The identities of members of the Organización Primero de Marzo (OPM), a guerrilla group fighting against the dictatorship of General Alfredo Stroessner in Paraguay, were given away when medical student and OPM member Carlos Brañas was captured by border guards in the city of Encarnación while trying to enter the South American nation after crossing over the Paraná River from Argentina. After being found to have OPM documents, Brañas was tortured and revealed the names of most of the organization's members and the location of their headquarters in the nation's capital, Asunción. OPM founder Juan Carlos Da Costa died later that day in a gunbattle with Asunción police, but not before shooting and killing its police commissioner, Alberto Buenaventura Cantero. Two other OPM leaders— Mario Schaerer Prono and his wife Guillermina Kannonikoff— escaped but would later be turned in by a local priest. Over the next several weeks, Paraguayan law enforcement would arrest more than 1,500 people and kill 20 of them.

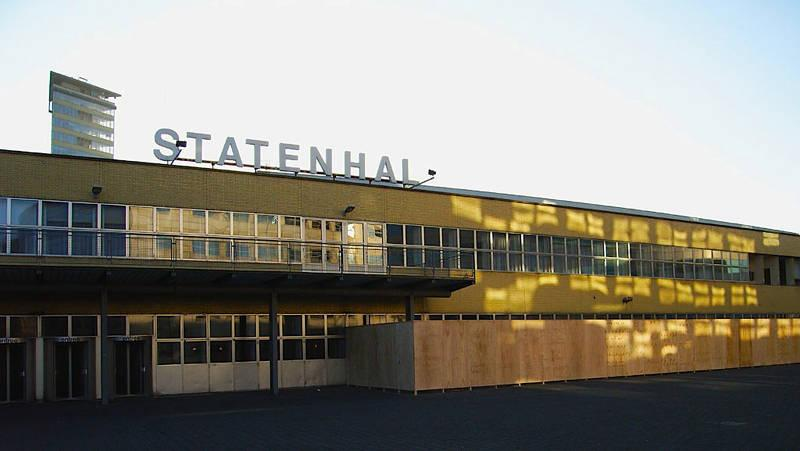
Nederlands Congresgebouw – venue for the 1976 Eurovision Song Contest on April 3

- The Eurovision Song Contest 1976 was held at The Hague, Netherlands, and was won by Brotherhood of Man, representing the United Kingdom, with "Save Your Kisses for Me".
- The first César Awards, France's version of the Oscar, were presented by the Académie des Arts et Techniques du Cinéma at a ceremony at the Palais des congrès de Paris. The award for Best French Film of 1975 went to Le Vieux Fusil, Best Actor went to its star Philippe Noiret and Best Actress went to Romy Schneider for L'important c'est d'aimer.
- Rigoberto Riasco of Panama won the first World Boxing Council super bantamweight championship, defeating Philip Waruinge of Kenya.

== April 4, 1976 (Sunday) ==
- Large crowds gathered at Beijing's "Monument of the Martyrs" in Tiananmen Square on the traditional Chinese day of mourning, to commemorate the death of Premier Zhou Enlai. Poems criticising the influential "Gang of Four" were read out loud. The next day, Beijing police removed the tributes; riots ensued and order was not restored until the day after.
- Voting was held in Thailand for the 279 seats of Thailand's House of Representatives, the Sapha Phuthaen Ratsadon. Prime Minister Kukrit Pramoj of the Social Action Party lost re-election for his seat, and was replaced by his older brother Seni Pramoj, leader of the Thailand Democrat Party that captured a plurality with 114 seats.
- The Cryonics Institute was founded in the Detroit suburb of Clinton Township by Robert Ettinger, with the preservation of the bodies of dead human beings in liquid nitrogen at a temperature of −196 °C (−320.8 °F) for possible restoration to life at a future time. The Institute would have 188 people in preservation 45 years after its founding, including Ettinger himself after his death in 2011.
- Died:
  - Harry Nyquist, 87, Swedish physicist and specialist in signal processing, for whom the Nyquist stability criterion, the Nyquist rate and the Nyquist frequency were named
  - Boris Ignatovich, 77, Soviet cinematographer and photojournalist

== April 5, 1976 (Monday) ==
- James Callaghan won the Labour Party leadership election as the members of parliament of the Labour Party vote on the replacement for Harold Wilson as leader of the majority party in the House of Commons and Prime Minister of the United Kingdom. In the third and final round of balloting among the 313 Labour MPs, Foreign Secretary Callaghan won 176 votes and Secretary of State for Employment Michael Foot received 137.
- A group of 29 Basque separatists incarcerated in Spain escaped from Segovia prison through tunnels they had built to reach the prison's drainage system. Most were recaptured by police and Civil Guards, although one was killed.
- The Pulitzer Prize-winning photograph captioned The Soiling of Old Glory was taken by Boston Herald American photojournalist Stanley Forman, as a white teenager used a flagpole with the American flag to attack a black lawyer during protests against busing to achieve desegregation of schools.
- Died:
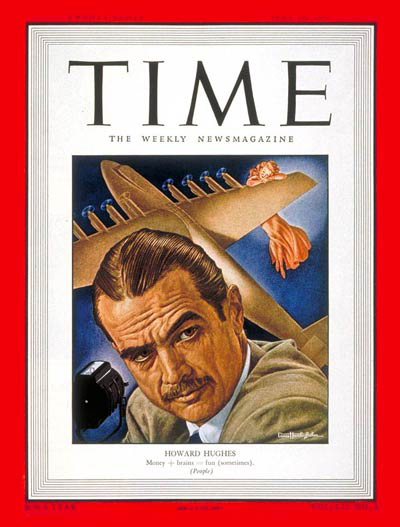
  Hughes in 1948
  - Howard Hughes, 70, U.S. billionaire and recluse; The eccentric Hughes had not been seen in public since 1961, and had become a recluse in 1966 with a permanent residence in the Desert Inn in Las Vegas. He was staying in the 30th-floor penthouse of the Acapulco Princess Hotel in Mexico when he became ill and was placed aboard a chartered Learjet for an emergency flight to Houston. According to a spokesman for the Summa Corporation, the holding company for the various companies owned by the aviator, Hughes died at 1:27 while the plane was approaching its landing in Texas.
  - Wilder Penfield, 85, U.S.-born Canadian neurosurgeon

== April 6, 1976 (Tuesday) ==
- Italy's ballistic missile program came to an end with the final test launches of its Alfa missile. Because of the high cost of the program in its first three years and Italy's ratification of the nuclear non-proliferation treaty, the launches would be discontinued afterward.
- South Korea's President Park Chung Hee announced at a meeting of his presidential cabinet that he was beginning a campaign to purify the Korean language in the nation by purging it of foreign words and phrases, most of them imports from English and Japanese. Park declared that "Foreign words are too excessive in our life, such as in advertisements, signboards, radio and TV broadcasting... and even in broadcasting sports," and assigned the Education Minister the role of coordinating the government's changeover to Korean substitute words. Park's previous decrees had been against long hair for men or short skirts for women, as well as putting limits on the amount of money to be spent on weddings and funerals. A deadline was given to merchants to have their signs "Koreanized" by August 4 or to face a month in jail.
- Former Georgia Governor Jimmy Carter, who had been the front-runner in the Democratic Party nomination for President of the United States, said in a campaign speech that the federal government should not interfere with the "ethnic purity" of American neighborhoods, raising questions of whether he was a bigot or white supremacist. On the same day, Carter finished as a distant third place competitor in the New York state Democratic primary, with only 33 delegates compared to 107 for Henry M. Jackson and 69 for Morris K. Udall. Carter apologized two days later for using the phrases "ethnic purity", "black intrusion" and "alien groups" in discussing established neighborhoods but said that his intent was to say that he "would not arbitrarily use federal force to move people of different ethnic background into a neighborhood just to change its character," though acknowledging that no plans for moving people had actually been proposed in Congress.
- Removal of Karen Ann Quinlan from life support by her parents became certain after New Jersey Attorney General William F. Hyland announced that he would not appeal the New Jersey Supreme Court's decision to the U.S. Supreme Court.
- The 1976 Gent–Wevelgem cycle race was held in Belgium and was won by Freddy Maertens.
- Two Cuban fishing boats, the Ferro 119 and Ferro 123, were attacked and sunk by a boat operated by Cuban exiles. One crew member was killed and another three were injured.
- William Schuman's Symphony No. 10, commissioned for the U.S. National Symphony Orchestra for the United States Bicentennial celebrations, was given its first performance.
- Born: Candace Cameron, American TV actress known for the TV series Full House and later as a panelist for The View; in the Panorama City neighborhood of Los Angeles
- Died: Luther Skaggs Jr., 53, U.S. Marine and Medal of Honor recipient for his heroism in repelling a Japanese attack during the 1944 Battle of Guam despite being severely wounded

== April 7, 1976 (Wednesday) ==
- In the People's Republic of China, acting Prime Minister Hua Guofeng was elevated by the Chinese Communist Party's Central Committee to the position of First Deputy Chairman, a sign that he was intended to succeed Mao Zedong as the nation's de facto leader. At the same time, Deng Xiaoping (Teng Hsiao-ping), once viewed as Mao's successor prior to the death of Premier Zhou Enlai, was removed by the CCP from his posts as Deputy Chairman of the Party, Deputy Prime Minister, and Chief of Staff of the Chinese Armed Forces. The government announced that the decision to elevate Hua to power and to dismiss Deng had both been made "on the proposal of our great leader, Chairman Mao"; the reason given for Deng's demotion was that "Having discussed the counterrevolutionary incident which took place at Tien An Men Square and Teng Hsiao-ping's latest behaviors," the Party declared that "the nature of the Teng Hsiao-peng problem had turned into one of antagonistic contradiction."
- Student rioting against the Libyan government, at universities in Tripoli and Benghazi, was brutally suppressed by the government of Muammar Gaddafi. On the one-year anniversary of the riots, protest leaders Omar Dabob and Muhammed Ben Saoud would be publicly executed, and regular executions would occur on April 7 in future years until Gaddafi's assassination in 2011.
- The government of Spain issued a decree granting veterans' pensions to disabled persons who had fought unsuccessfully against Francisco Franco during the Spanish Civil War. Members of Franco's Nationalist Army had been entitled to pensions, but compensation for disability had been denied to those who had fought for the Army of the Second Spanish Republic for the duration of Franco's rule of Spain.
- In the longest airplane hijacking in history, the diversion of a flight for 8,800 miles (14,200 km), a Philippine Air Lines BAC One-Eleven was hijacked and diverted to Manila, with the hijackers demanding US$300,000 and the release of 70 prisoners. They subsequently forced the plane to fly to locations in Malaysia and Thailand, where Philippine Air Lines provided them with a Douglas DC-8. After the release of the political prisoners and the safe arrival of the hijacked plane in Benghazi in Libya, the hijackers released the 10 crewmembers and two civilians held as hostages and requested political asylum.

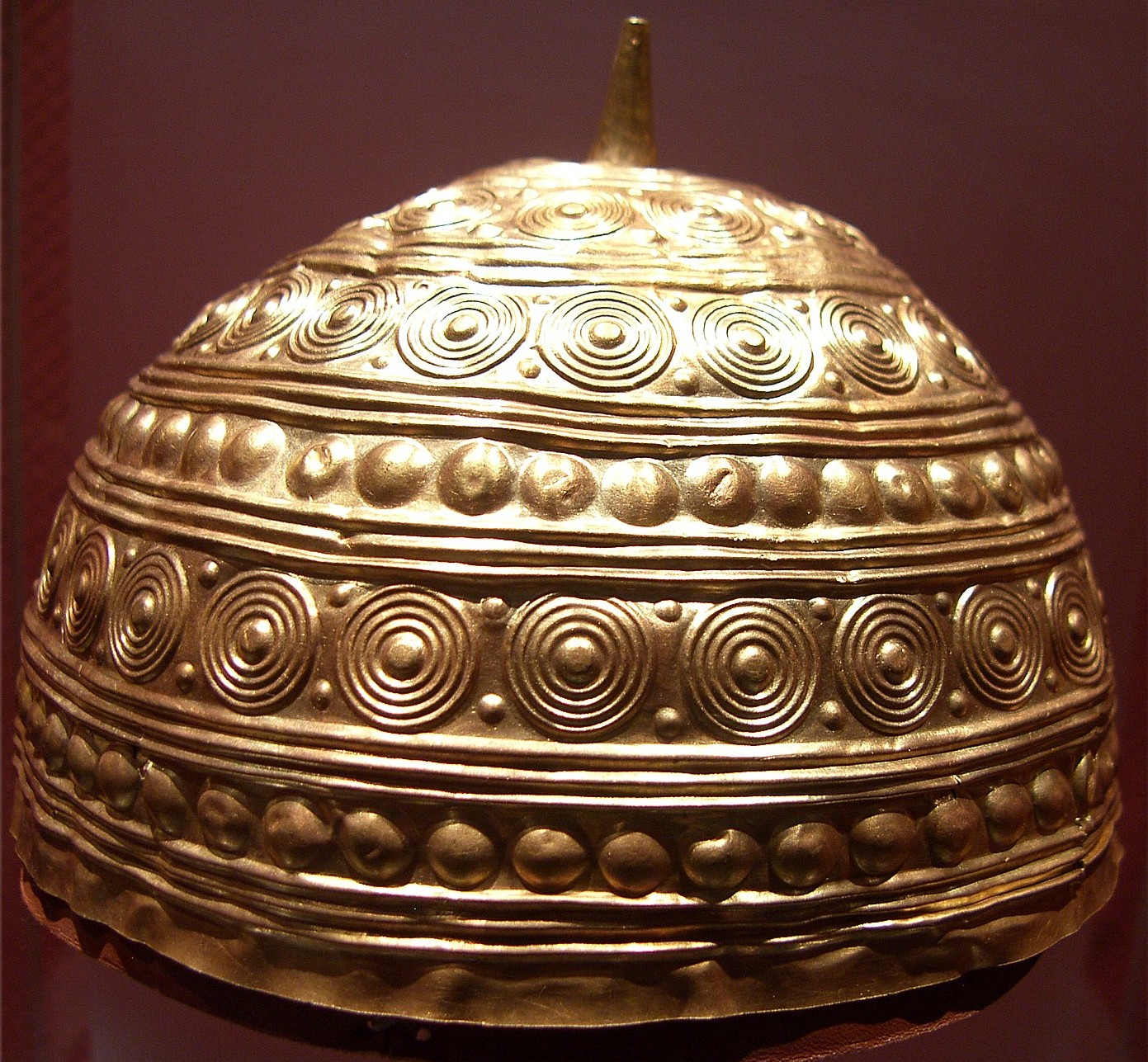
The Casco

- The Casco de Leiro, a solid gold helmet worn in rituals in Iberia during the Bronze Age as early as 1000 BC, was discovered almost 3,000 years later by José Vicente Somoza, a fisherman, near the municipality of Leiro in the Galicia region of Spain. The artifact is now on display at a museum in La Coruña.
- Leo Burt, a fugitive since the killing of a physics professor by a bomb on August 24, 1970, was removed from the FBI Ten Most Wanted Fugitives List. More than 50 years after first he was first identified as a suspect, Burt's location and fate remains unknown.
- The British TV situation comedy Man About the House, starring Richard O'Sullivan, Paula Wilcox and Sally Thomsett and about three unmarried friends— a man and two women— sharing an apartment and renting from a Mr. and Mrs. Roper, ended a run of three years on ITV. It would be adapted in 1977 and remade for U.S. audiences as Three's Company.
- Baseball pitcher Joe Niekro of the Houston Astros was credited with five strikeouts (rather than the normal limit of three for three outs that end an inning) in the first inning of an unusual game in New Orleans against the Minnesota Twins. Because catcher Cliff Johnson dropped five of Niekro's pitches, the "passed ball" rule allowed five batters to advance to first base, including two who advanced after the third strike was called. Because the 10 to 3 loss was an exhibition game, however, no Major League Baseball record was set.
- In Iran, the Ayatollah Abolhassan Shamsabadi was kidnapped in Isfahan by two men who offered him a ride while he and his wife were walking to prayers at a nearby mosque. Shamsabadi was strangled to death and his body was found a few hours later in a nearby village, with a piece of fabric looped around his neck. His killers avoided taking the large sum of money that Shamsabadi had been carrying. Four suspects were arrested more than a month later by the government of the Shah of Iran.
- The 5th European Badminton Championships, held in Dublin, Ireland, concluded with Flemming Delfs and Gillian Gilks winning the men's and women's single titles, respectively.
- Died: Mary Margaret McBride, 76, American radio talk-show host from 1934 to 1960

== April 8, 1976 (Thursday) ==
- In Malaysia, the Campbell Shopping Complex in Kuala Lumpur, including a 20-floor office tower and shops on the ground floor, was destroyed by fire. Although 156 shops and 41 offices were ruined by the blaze, which was later traced to faulty electrical wiring, only one person was killed.
- The star Epsilon Geminorum, which can be studied from Earth, was occulted by the planet Mars. Because it is located close to the level of the ecliptic, the plane in which Earth and the other planets of the Solar System orbit, Epsilon Geminorum can be studied when a planet comes directly between it and Earth.
- The National Football League draft began at the Roosevelt Hotel in New York City.
- The Cypriot cargo ship MS Kaptanvassos capsized and sank off Perama, Greece, with the loss of five crew members.
- Died: Joseph "Joey" Cappelletti, 13, younger brother of Heisman Trophy-winning football player John Cappelletti, whose illness and death raised national awareness of leukemia; highlighted in the book and TV film Something for Joey

== April 9, 1976 (Friday) ==
- The United States and the Soviet Union announced completion of a draft treaty to limit the size of underground nuclear tests intended for peaceful purposes to no more than 150 kilotons, along with the first ever procedures for verification of compliance.
- The Communist government of Laos began a "cultural revolution" to root out people still adhering to the "depraved reactionary way of life" prevalent in the Western world including American and European hairstyles, clothes and manners, as well as announcing the detention and re-education of drug addicts, prostitutes, unemployed youth, juvenile delinquents and people who refused to attend Communist-mandated seminars.

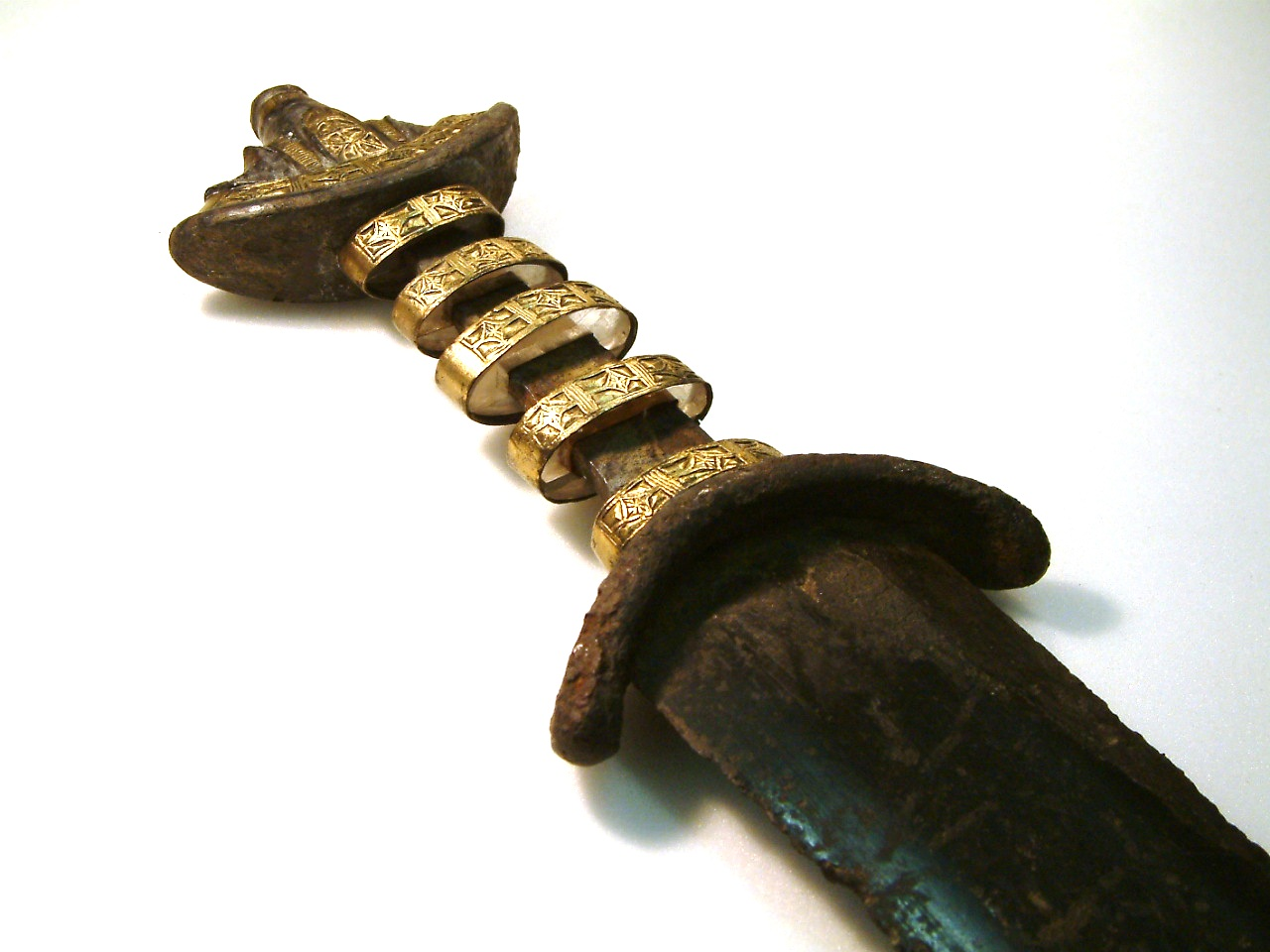
The Gilling sword

- The Gilling sword, dating from the early 10th century AD, was found in England by a 9-year-old boy, Gary Fridd, at Gilling West, North Yorkshire. Fridd would be allowed to keep the 33 in (840 mm) Anglo-Saxon sword after the British government's choice not to classify it as a national treasure, and the family would sell it at an auction the following year. The sword is now on display at the Yorkshire Museum.
- The 1976 Tour of the Basque Country cycle race was won by Gianbattista Baronchelli.
- Peter Hain, leader of the UK's National League of Young Liberals was found not guilty of stealing £490 from Barclays Bank. It would later be confirmed that the charge was the result of covert operations by South African agents trying to discredit Hain because of his anti-apartheid campaigning.
- Died:
  - Phil Ochs, 35, American songwriter known for left-wing political philosophy and composing and performing anti-war songs, by suicide
  - Joseph Philippe Karam, 53, Lebanese architect, from a sudden heart attack
  - Gloria Spencer, 39, African-American gospel singer who weighed 797 pounds (362 kg) at the time of her death; from congestive heart failure

== April 10, 1976 (Saturday) ==
- Belgium's Prime Minister, Leo Tindemans, in a TV interview, explained his country's decision to purchase U.S. fighter planes instead of French Mirage jets, in the context of a common defence strategy for Europe.
- The Screamin' Eagle, at the time the tallest (110 feet (34 m) high) and fastest (62 miles per hour (100 km/h) speed) roller coaster opened as an attraction at Six Flags St. Louis
- Born: Saba Mubarak, Jordanian actress and producer, in Anjara
- Died: Santos Ortega, 76, American TV actor who had been in the cast of the soap opera As the World Turns for 20 years

== April 11, 1976 (Sunday) ==
- A referendum was held on the South Pacific island of Mayotte on whether to become an Overseas Territory of France. Only 90 people voted in favor of the proposal, while 3,457 voted against it, and almost 14,000 of the 17,000 votes were thrown out as invalid.
- The 1976 Masters golf tournament, held at the Augusta National Golf Club in the United States, was won by Raymond Floyd.
- Marc Tardif, the leading scorer for the World Hockey Association (WHA) as a player for the Quebec Nordiques, was seriously injured in an attack by Rick Jodzio of the Calgary Cowboys in a playoff game at Quebec City. Jodzio charged 30 feet and knocked down Tardif with his hockey stick, then took off his gloves and threw punches until Tardif was unconscious. Players from both teams then charged onto the ice and began fighting each other. Jodzio and his coach, Joe Crozier, were suspended indefinitely by the WHA, while a one-game suspension was levied against Quebec coach Guy Gendron and Quebec players Gord Gallant and Danny Lawson. After being indicted in a Quebec criminal court for assault with intent to injure, Jodzio would plead guilty on August 17, 1977, to unintentionally causing bodily harm, and be fined C$3,000.
- Died:
  - Allie Beth Martin, 61, President of the American Library Association since 1975 and the architect of public library improvements in the late 20th century in the U.S., as summarized in A Strategy for Public Library Change
  - Gerhard Thurow, 41, West German Grand Prix motorcycle racer, in a crash during a race at Tilburg in the Netherlands. Thurow lost control while leading the 50cc cycle race and crashed into a tree, breaking his neck.
  - Lou Scheper-Berkenkamp, 74, German children's book author and illustrator
  - Liam Dunn, 59, American film and TV character actor and comedian, after collapsing on the set during the filming of The Shaggy D.A.; from respiratory failure caused by emphysema

== April 12, 1976 (Monday) ==
- In elections for municipal government offices in the West Bank in Israel, the Palestine Liberation Organization was successful on a turnout of 72.3% (about 63,000 voters). The election was the first in the West Bank, occupied by Israel since the Six-Day War of 1967, to allow women to vote.
- Ronald Wayne, who had co-founded the Apple Computer Company on April 1 with Steve Jobs and Steve Wozniak, sold his 10 percent share of the company back to Jobs and Wozniak for only $800.
- The Israeli Air Force intercepted a C-130 military transport plane from Saudi Arabia and forced it to land in Tel Aviv after the Saudi aircraft had strayed into Israeli airspace during a flight from Riyadh toward the Syrian capital, Damascus. The C-130, with 36 people on board (including 25 Syrian Army airmen) had been seen over Rosh HaNikra on the Israeli side of the border with Lebanon. The Saudi plane was allowed to leave the next morning after Israel concluded that the American crew and its Saudi navigator had strayed because of a navigational error.
- After more than 50 years, the "Russell baby case" in the United Kingdom was resolved with a unanimous decision by the nine members of the House of Lords Committee for Privileges and Conduct that Geoffrey Russell was the rightful holder of the hereditary peerage of Baron Ampthill, despite claims in 1921 by the late John Russell, 3rd Baron Ampthill and by his wife Christabel Hulme Hart (Geoffrey Russell's mother) that John Russell was not the father. After John Russell's death in 1973, his son John Hugo Russell had challenged the legitimacy of Geoffrey's birth and the entitlement to the peerage. Lord Wilberforce of the Committee states in the ruling, "If ever there was a case for closing the chapter in a family's history, the case for closing this in 1926 after the distressing revelations and divisions over so many years, must be one."

== April 13, 1976 (Tuesday) ==
- An explosion killed 40 employees of an ammunition factory in Finland in the city of Lapua, and injured 60 others.

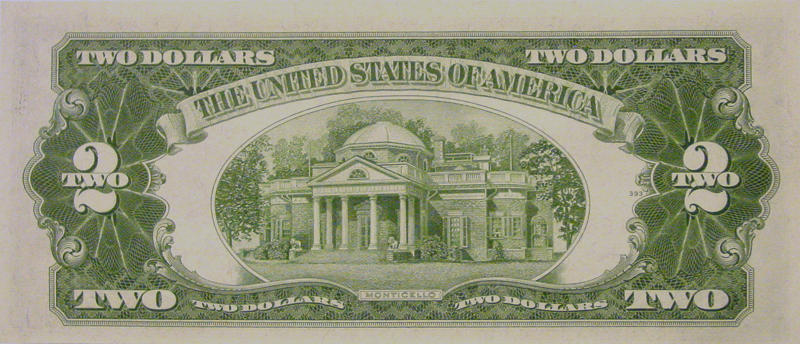
The old $2 bill

- The United States two-dollar bill, bearing the face of Thomas Jefferson, was reintroduced by the United States Treasury Department as a Federal Reserve Note as an element of the United States Bicentennial celebration. The U.S. Mint had not printed the bills since June 30, 1965 and had suspended production on August 10, 1966. The reverse side of the bill, rather than showing Jefferson's mansion of Monticello, depicts instead the signing of the U.S. Declaration of Independence.
- Born: Jonathan Brandis, American TV actor known for the series SeaQuest DSV; in Danbury, Connecticut (died 2003)
- Died:
  - Chou Jung-hsin (revised Zhou Rongxin), 59, China's Minister of Education since 1975, died after being deposed during the Gang of Four renewed Cultural Revolution
  - Sabri al-Asali, 72, three-time Prime Minister of Syria between 1954 and 1958 and the original Vice President of the United Arab Republic during Syria's merger with Egypt
  - Marja Kubašec, 86, German novelist who wrote in the Upper Sorbian language for the Sorbian minority

== April 14, 1976 (Wednesday) ==
- The Supreme Court of Japan rules, 8 to 7, that the nation's electoral procedures were unconstitutional because of the failure to provide equal representation for voters. Despite a law requiring redistricting every five years, no readjustment in election districts had taken place in 12 years.
- All 31 passengers and the crew of three on an Avro 748 airplane were killed in Argentina, when the Avro 748's right wing fell off in midair due to metal fatigue, followed by separation of the right tailplane. The airplane chartered to carry employees of Argentina's Yacimientos Petrolíferos Fiscales (YPF) oil company, crashed near Cutral Có in Nequen Province, with no survivors.
- The Arab Satellite Communications Organization (Arabsat) was founded in Riyadh in Saudi Arabia as a consortium of Arab nations to develop and launch communications satellites. The first two satellites, Arabsat-1A and Arabsat-1B, would be placed into orbit in 1985.
- Soviet nuclear physicist Andrei Sakharov and his wife Yelena Bonner were arrested during a visit to the city of Omsk in Siberia after hitting two policemen outside of a courtroom. The Sakharovs had traveled to Omsk, closed to foreigners, in order to call attention the trial of Crimean Tatar dissident Mustafa Dzhemilev and were blocked by plainclothes police officers from entering the courtroom. When one of the police grabbed Bonner's arm and another shoved Dr. Sakharov, he slapped both of them. Sakharov and Bonner were then transported back to Moscow and confined to house arrest.
- A group of 50 baboons escaped the Lion Country Safari wildlife preserve of the Kings Island Amusement Park near Mason, Ohio All of the primates would be eventually recaptured within a week.
- Died:
  - Zuzu Angel (Zuleika Angel Jones), 54, Brazilian-American fashion designer and advocate for human rights in Brazil after the arrest and disappearance of her son, in an automobile accident in Rio de Janeiro
  - Mariano Ospina Pérez, 84, President of Colombia from 1946 to 1950
  - Maudie Prickett, 61, American character actress on film

== April 15, 1976 (Thursday) ==
- The world's two most populous nations, the People's Republic of China and India announced that they were restoring full diplomatic relations for the first time in 15 years, with India preparing to send an ambassador to Beijing. Since 1961, when the two nations removed their ambassadors because of a border dispute, the highest level of representation in Beijing and New Delhi had been a chargé d'affaires.
- The Soviet Union ended its military presence in Egypt as the last five Soviet warships depart Alexandria at one hour before the midnight deadline.
- The 1976 La Flèche Wallonne cycle race was won by Joop Zoetemelk.
- Born: Seigo Narazaki, Japanese soccer football goalkeeper with 77 appearances for the national team; in Kashiba, Nara Prefecture
- Died:
  - Gerald L. K. Smith, 78, American radio evangelist and crusader against Communism.
  - Lieutenant General David Elazar, 50, commander of Israel Defense Forces during the 1973 Yom Kippur War.

== April 16, 1976 (Friday) ==
- India's government, in an attempt to prevent a population explosion, introduced a family planning initiative along with a minimum age for marriage of 21 years for men and 18 years for women. The programme arouses controversy and was ultimately unsuccessful.
- Thirteen oil workers on the U.S. drilling rig Ocean Express were killed, when the escape capsule that they had used to evacuate the toppling rig, sank in the Gulf of Mexico. The other 23 people on the rig were able to reach safety.
- Born:
  - Leslie Porterfield, American motorcyclist who set a record for women in 2008 by reaching a speed of 232.522 miles per hour (374.208 km/h) on a motorcycle, named Female Rider of the Year by American Motorcyclist Association
  - Shu Qi, Taiwanese model and actress; in Xindian District of Taipei, under the name Lin Li-hui
- Died: Vera C. Bushfield, 86, U.S. Senator for South Dakota from October 6 to December 26, 1948

== April 17, 1976 (Saturday) ==
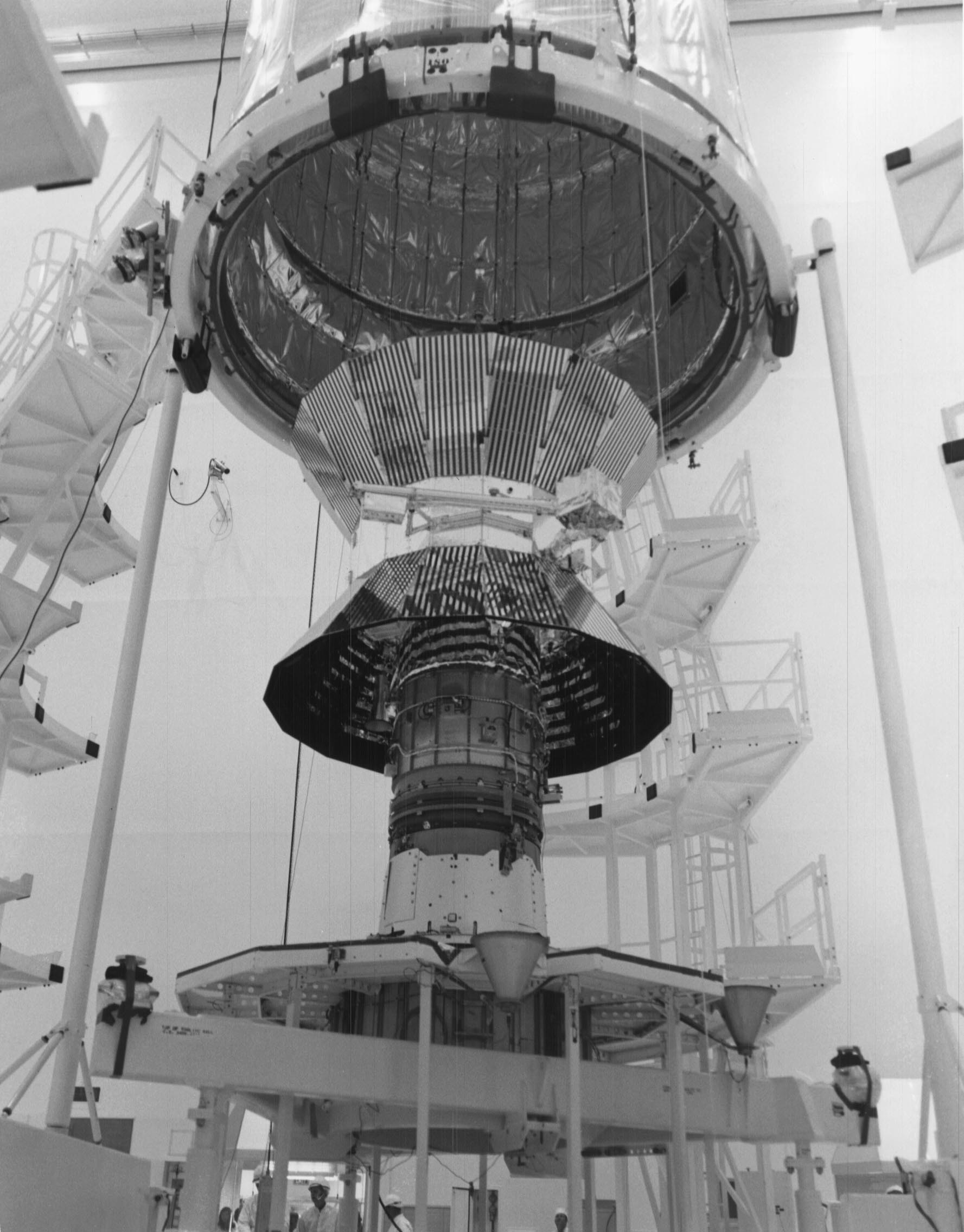
Helios-B

- The Helios-B solar observer, built in West Germany and launched from Cape Canaveral on January 15, came nearer to the Sun than any previous man-made object, reaching perihelion at 27,000,000 miles (43,000,000 km), nearer than the planet Mercury.
- U.S. President Gerald Ford appeared in three pre-recorded segments on the NBC comedy show Saturday Night Live (then called NBC's Saturday Night) when White House Press Secretary Ron Nessen was the guest host. Viewers saw and heard President Ford delivering the line "Live from New York, it's Saturday Night!", as well as introducing "your host, Ron Nessen" and responding to one of Chevy Chase's jokes with "I'm Gerald Ford... and you're not."
- Mike Schmidt of the Philadelphia Phillies became the first National League baseball player in the 20th Century to hit 4 consecutive home runs (i.e., a home run in each of his times at bat) in a single game, and only the fourth overall in Major League Baseball history to accomplish the feat, as the Phillies defeated the Chicago Cubs, 18 to 16, in ten innings. Bobby Lowe of the Boston Beaneaters had hit four homers in a row in a National League game on May 30, 1894, and two American League players (Lou Gehrig in 1932 and Rocky Colavito in 1959) had done the same. Six other players had hit four home runs in a game, but not consecutively.
- Evonne Goolagong defeated Chris Evert to win the singles title in the 1976 Virginia Slims Championships tennis tournament at the Los Angeles Sports Arena in the United States.
- The legend of The Cornish Owlman began when two young girls in a village in Cornwall in the United Kingdom claimed to have seen a large "feathered bird-man" hovering over St Mawnan and St Stephen's Church in the village of Mawnan.
- Died: Yirawala, 79, Aboriginal Australian painter whose artworks were displayed at the National Gallery of Australia and the National Museum of Australia

== April 18, 1976 (Sunday) ==
- Police in India fired into a crowd of protesters at the Turkman Gate in Delhi, killing at least 20 people who were fighting the proposed demolition of their homes as part of a slum clearance project. Because of press restrictions during India's ongoing state of emergency, the details were not published in India at the time but word of the clash was reported in Western newspapers by the Associated Press, which noted five policemen and seven civilians had died.
- Born: Melissa Joan Hart, American actress, in Smithtown, New York, the daughter of producer Paula Hart
- Died: Henrik Dam, 81, Danish biochemist and Nobel laureate

== April 19, 1976 (Monday) ==
- The M-19 Colombian terrorist group executed labor union leader José Raquel Mercado, the president of the Confederation of Workers of Colombia, whom it had kidnapped in February, then left his body at a busy intersection in downtown Bogotá.
- Windows on the World, a popular restaurant and conference center in New York City, opened on the 107th floor of the North Tower of the World Trade Center. The restaurant would operate for more than 35 years before being destroyed, along with both of the Twin Towers, in the 9/11 terrorist attack on September 11, 2001
- The Army Command College of the Chinese People's Liberation Army, a service academy for training of officers in Communist China's army, opened in the Pukou District of Nanjing as the "Nanjing Military Region Military and Political Cadre School".
- In the premier American endurance race, Jack Fultz won the Boston Marathon in a time of 2 hours, 20 minutes and 19 seconds.
- A violent F5 tornado struck near Brownwood, Texas, injuring 11 people. Two people were thrown at least 1,000 yards (910 m) by the tornado and survived uninjured.
- Born:
  - Wyatt Cenac, American comedian and TV producer; in New York City
  - Bhavin Gopani, Indian Gujarati language poet known for preserving the ghazal form of poetry; in Ahmedabad, Gujarat state
  - Cipha Sounds (stage name for Luis Diaz), American comedian and presenter for MTV; in the Bronx, New York City

== April 20, 1976 (Tuesday) ==
- The landmark decision of Williams v. Saxbe, the first award of damages for sexual harassment in the United States, was decided by the U.S. District Court for the District of Columbia. Diane R. Williams, a U.S. Department of Justice employee who had been fired from her job on September 22, 1972, after refusing her supervisor's sexual advances, was awarded $19,147 in compensation by Judge Charles R. Richey, who agreed that the Justice Department violated the Civil Rights Act of 1964.
- The PNOC Exploration Corporation, a subsidiary of the Philippine National Oil Company, was incorporated by the Philippine government to control oil drilling in the nation's territorial land and waters.
- The South American nation of Argentina, facing difficulty in obtaining loans, entered into the Argentine-U.S. Fiscal Agency Agreement arranging for government bonds to be issued and repaid by an American bank, with Argentina's government agreeing to U.S. court jurisdiction for suits over the bonds.
- National Hockey League President Clarence Campbell, who had led the NHL since 1946 and guided its growth from six to 18 teams, was indicted for conspiracy and fraud for attempting to bribe Canadian Senator Louis Giguere in obtaining a lease for a business within Ottawa's Dorval Airport.
- The 1976 Monte Carlo Open tennis tournament concluded, with Guillermo Vilas the victor in the Men's Singles and Helga Masthoff winning the Women's competition.
- The Japanese video game manufacturer Data East began operations in Suginami City, continuing in business until going bankrupt in 2003.
- The Swedish video game distributor Bergsala AB began operations at Kungsbacka
- Died: Dulcie Markham, 62, Australian prostitute, brothel operator and organized crime figure nicknamed "The Angel of Death", died in a fire at her house in the Sydney suburb of Bondi, New South Wales

== April 21, 1976 (Wednesday) ==
- In Australia, a gang of six robbers stole as much as $16 million from bookmakers at the Victorian Club in Melbourne. According to the victims, two getaway cars were used and six gunmen carried out the armed robbery. Melbourne police speculated that the other accomplices were the two drivers, two lookout men, and possibly two masterminds. The money was never recovered and most of the thieves would never be apprehended.

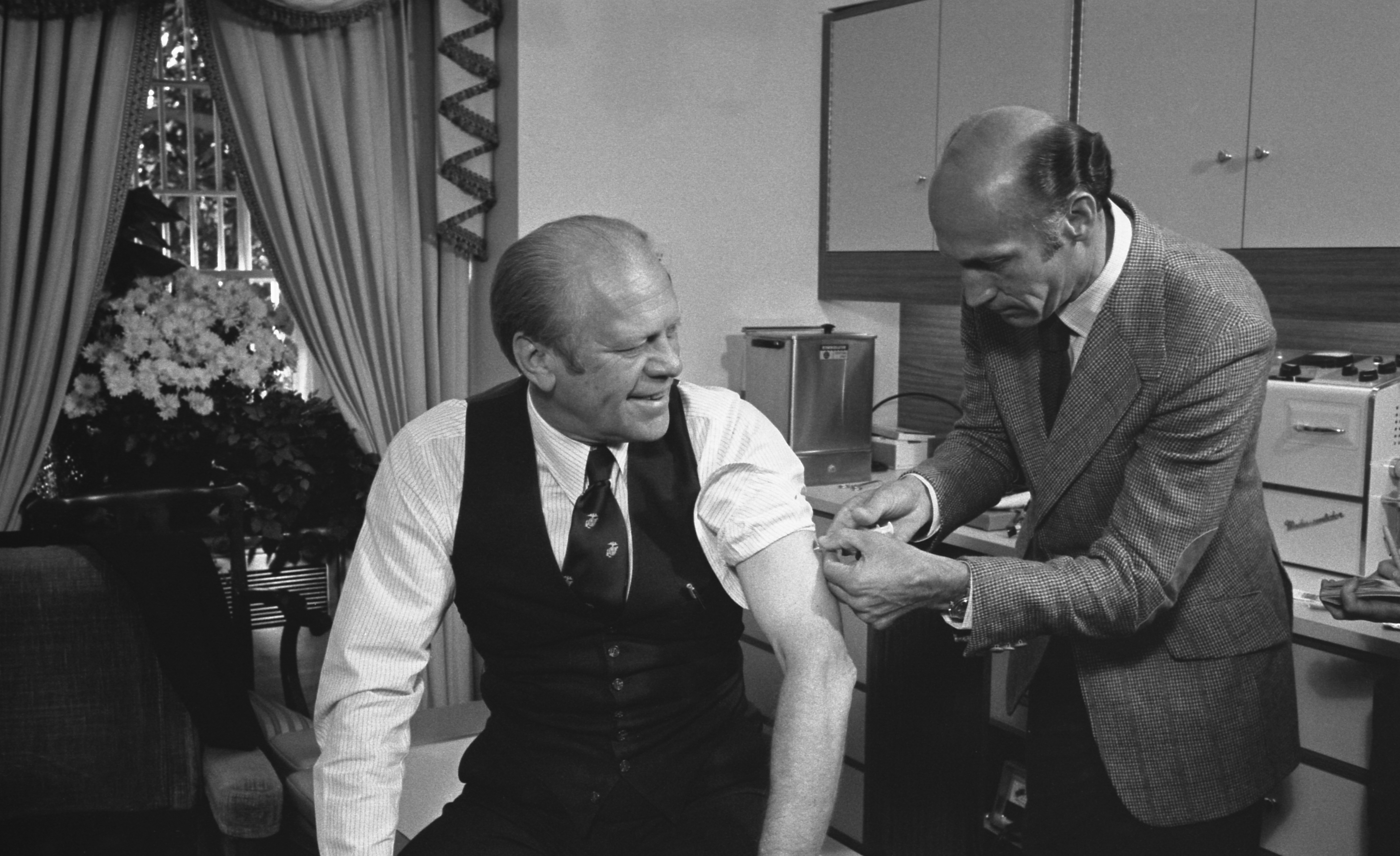
U.S. President Ford getting vaccinated

- Egypt signed a military pact with the People's Republic of China to purchase or be given jet engines and spare parts for the MiG jet fighters that had been supplied five years earlier by the Soviet Union. The Soviet refusal to supply spare parts had been cited by Egypt's President Anwar Sadat as the reason for his break with the USSR.
- What was called, at the time, "the largest and most intensive immunization program ever attempted in the United States" began with the first vaccines administered for the swine flu, with 200 million doses prepared in an effort to reach every resident of the U.S.; Dr. Harry M. Meyer Jr., an official with the U.S. Food and Drug Administration, received the first shot, which was administered by Dr. Theodore Cooper.

== April 22, 1976 (Thursday) ==
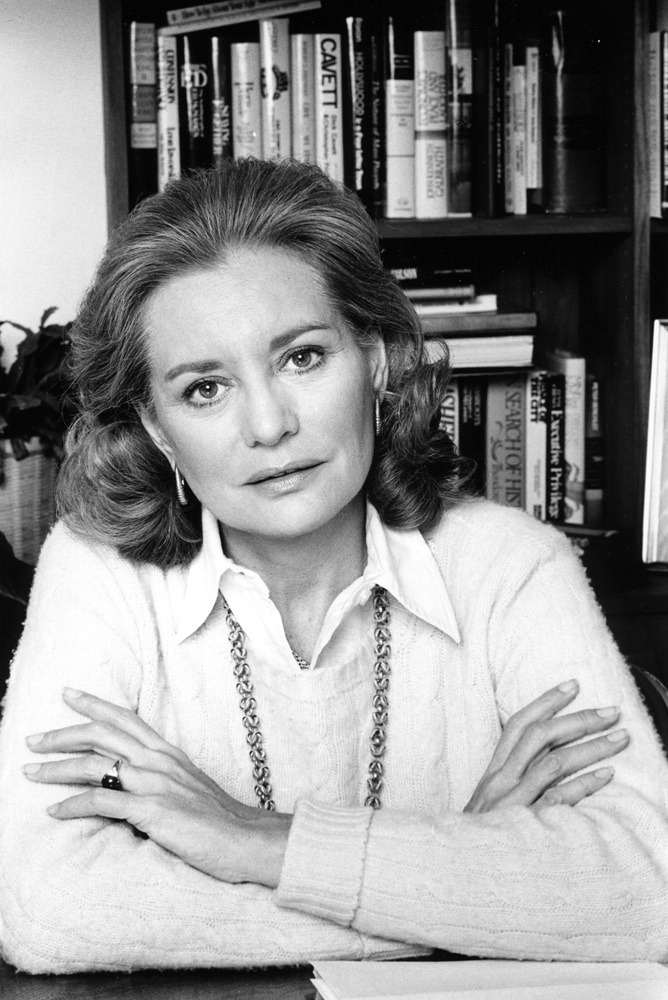
Walters

- Barbara Walters, a reporter and co-host of the Today show on NBC, accepted a contract to become the world's highest-paid newscaster and the first woman to ever anchor an evening news program for a major television network. Walters agreed to a five-year contract and a salary of $1,000,000 per year to serve as co-anchor, with Harry Reasoner, of the ABC Evening News, beginning in September.
- Newspapers in Italy identified the nation's three most prominent political leaders — Prime Minister Aldo Moro, President Giovanni Leone and Foreign Minister Mariano Rumor — as suspects in the Lockheed bribery scandals.
- In the U.S. state of Massachusetts, a dynamite explosion at the Suffolk County Courthouse in Boston injured 21 people, seven of them seriously. The bomb, which exploded at 9:12 in the morning, knocked down an interior wall and a ceiling, shattered windows and tore a three-foot wide hole in a marble floor.
- South African Prime Minister John Vorster announced plans for a Ministerial Joint Committee comprising representatives of South Africa and Israel.

== April 23, 1976 (Friday) ==
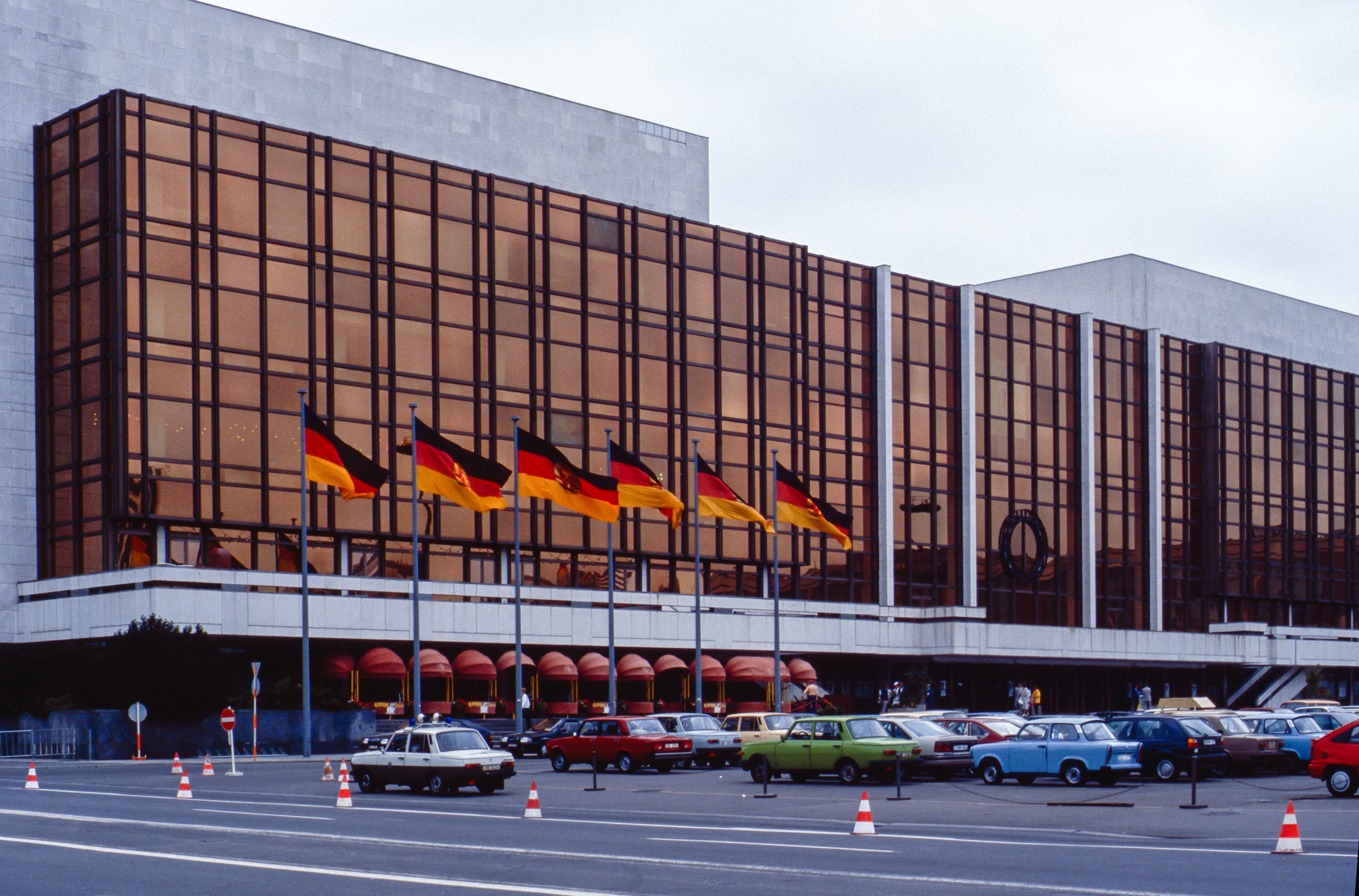
East Germany's Palast der Republik

- The Palast der Republik opened in East Berlin to provide the chambers and offices of East Germany's parliament, the Volkskammer and to provide cultural attractions for East German citizens. Because of the use of asbestos in its construction, the Palace would be closed from 1990 to 2004 after German reunification.
- Claudio Sánchez-Albornoz, who had led the opposition to Francisco Franco outside of Spain and who led the Spanish Republican government in exile from 1962 to 1971, returned to his homeland for the first time in 40 years. Sánchez-Albornoz, who had served as a minister in the Second Spanish Republic for President Niceto Alcalá-Zamora, had been Spain's Ambassador to Portugal until Portugal declared its support for General Franco in the Spanish Civil War.
- Ray Reardon defeated Alex Higgins in the final of the 1976 World Snooker Championship.
- The Ramones, the foremost punk rock band in the U.S., released their first album, Ramones.

== April 24, 1976 (Saturday) ==
- Lebanon's President Suleiman Franjieh agreed to allow the Lebanese Parliament to vote for a new president, signing an amendment to the Middle Eastern nation's constitution to allow his replacement.
- An Avianca Boeing 727-59 (registration HK-1400) was hijacked by a lone armed passenger after take-off from Pereira, Colombia. He surrendered to the authorities on arrival at Bogotá, the plane's original destination.
- Lorne Michaels, producer of Saturday Night Live, made an on-air offer to pay the Beatles $3,000 to reunite on the show. John Lennon would later claim that he and Paul McCartney were together in New York and had discussed the possibility of going to the SNL studio "for a gag".
- Died:
  - Agustin Fabian, 74, popular Filipino novelist known for having written some of the first Tagalog language novels.
  - Arne Vidar Røed, 29, Norwegian merchant marine and later a truck driver who had contracted AIDS in the 1960s. His 8-year-old daughter, not identified by name, had died on January 4 and his wife would die in December. Blood samples taken from the three Røed family members would later be tested in the 1980s and found to have the HIV virus. Røed was identified in medical journals as "Arvid Noe".

== April 25, 1976 (Sunday) ==
- The new Constitution of Portugal, which proclaimed socialism as a national goal, went into effect and included language declaring that education should promote the concept of a classless society, that the state should work toward collective ownership of the principal means of production, land and natural resources, and that the nation's political parties should "participate in the revolutionary process".
- Portugal conducted elections for the unicameral parliament, the 263-member Assembleia da República. The highest finisher was the Socialist Party, which won 107 seats, under Mário Soares.
- Elections were held for the 492 seats of the National Assembly of Vietnam, to take office after the formal unification of the Socialist Republic of Vietnam (North Vietnam) and the Republic of South Vietnam, both of which have been under Communist control since the fall of Saigon on April 30, 1975. Of the seats available, 281 candidates selected by the party for their "contributions to the revolution" were listed for the 243 seats for South Vietnam, and an undisclosed number of candidates were voted upon for the 249 seats in North Vietnam.
- A group of 582 inmates imprisoned in Laos, many of them political prisoners who were incarcerated after the fall of the Laotian government to the Pathet Lao, escaped the national prison in Vientiane after killing the prison director, members of his family and 15 guards. About 50 were killed while fleeing, and half of the remaining ones were recaptured within a few days, but others would be able to make their way to the border city of Nong Khai in Thailand.
- The French motorcycle Grand Prix was held at Le Mans and won by Herbert Rittberger.
- Chicago Cubs baseball player Rick Monday noticed two protesters trying to burn an American flag in the outfield during a game at Dodger Stadium. Monday snatched the flag from them; both were arrested. Monday said later, "If you're going to burn the flag, don't do it around me. I've been to too many veterans' hospitals and seen too many broken bodies of guys who tried to protect it."
- Born:
  - Kim Jong-kook, South Korean singer and half of the popular duo Turbo, with Kim Jung-nam and later with Myung-ik "Mikey" Cho; in Yongsan District, Seoul
  - Katrina Milosevic, Australian TV state and TV actress; in Mount Isa, Queensland
- Died: Sir Carol Reed, 68, English film director

== April 26, 1976 (Monday) ==
- The survival ordeal of set designer Lauren Elder began when the Cessna airplane that she was on crashed into Mount Bradley in Inyo County, California. With a fractured arm and wearing clothing ill-suited for the cold weather, Elder gradually descended the mountain and reached the town of Independence, California two days later. Her story would later be documented in a book and in a TV movie, And I Alone Survived.
- Born: Sulafa Memar, Syrian film and TV actress; in Damascus
- Died:
  - Marshal Andrei Grechko, 72, Minister of Defense of the Soviet Union since 1967 and a full member of the ruling Communist Party Politburo, died of a sudden heart attack.
  - Sid James (stage name for Solomon Cohen), 62, South African-born British stage, film and TV comedy actor, from a heart attack while appearing on stage in Sunderland in northeast England;
  - Joe David Brown, 60, American novelist whose book Addie Pray was adapted to the film Paper Moon

== April 27, 1976 (Tuesday) ==
- Thirty-seven of the 88 people on American Airlines Flight 625 are killed when the Boeing 727 overruns the runway at St. Thomas, U.S. Virgin Islands. Flight 625 had originated in Providence, Rhode Island and then departed for Kennedy International Airport in New York at 11:45 in the morning before crashing shortly after its 4:00 p.m. landing.
- Eleven Malaysian Armed Forces military personnel were killed when the helicopter they were on, a Royal Malaysian Air Force Sikorsky S-61 helicopter was shot down by terrorists in the Kedah state near Gubir.
- U.S. patent number 3,953,766 was granted to inventors Bill Gore and his son Robert W. Gore for expanded polytetrafluoroethylene, a highly-elastic polymer that they had adapted to the lightweight, waterproof textile Gore-Tex.
- U.S. patent number 3,948,485 was granted to two rock climbers, Yvon Chouinard and Tom Frost, for their invention of the Hexentrics climbing equipment, commonly called a "Hex", designed to secure a tight hold within existing cracks within rock to avoid the use of drilling and bolts
- Pope Paul VI elevated 19 bishops to the status of Roman Catholic Cardinals, including two who were not identified by him at the time (later revealed to be Vietnam's Trinh Nhu Khue, Archbishop of Hanoi, and Czechoslovakia's František Tomášek, Archbishop of Prague, because of the danger of persecution. The declaration increased the College of Cardinals from 117 to 136.
- The unsuccessful Broadway musical So Long, 174th Street, with music and lyrics by Stan Daniels, opened at the Harkness Theatre and would close two weeks later after only 16 performances.
- Born:
  - Sally Hawkins, Golden Globe-winning English film and stage actress; in Dulwich, London
  - Javier Vazquez, Cuban-born mixed martial artist, in Santiago de Cuba
- Died: Naeem Hashmi, Pakistani character actor on film, television and stage; from complications of diabetes

== April 28, 1976 (Wednesday) ==
- By a vote of 4 to 1, the Supreme Court of India upheld the constitutionality of Prime Minister Indira Gandhi's "national emergency" imprisonment of her political opponents without due process, in what The New York Times described as "a milestone in the dismantling of India's democratic institutions.
- For the first time in the history of white minority-ruled African nation of Rhodesia (now Zimbabwe), the Prime Minister's cabinet included black ministers, with four tribal chiefs being administered the oath of office. All four were members of the Rhodesian Senate. The highest ranking official, Jeremiah Chirau and Tafirenyika Mangwende were chiefs in the Mashona people, the largest tribe in Rhodesia, while Kayisa Ndiweni and Zefania Charumbira lead the Northern Ndebele people. The move came a day after Prime Minister Ian D. Smith met with U.S. Secretary of State Henry Kissinger, and was criticized by Zimbabwean nationalists as an empty gesture.
- The Kentucky Colonels, the first and last major professional basketball team in Louisville, Kentucky, played their last game, losing in the semifinals of the American Basketball Association playoffs to the Denver Nuggets. At season's end, the Colonels were the only one of the five ABA playoff teams (Denver, Indiana, Kentucky, the New York Nets and San Antonio) who were not admitted into the National Basketball Association.
- Died:
  - Walther von Seydlitz-Kurzbach, 87, German Wehrmacht General who commanded the 51st Army Corps at the Battle of Stalingrad until being relieved of his duties for advocating surrender to the Soviets.
  - Joaquín Sáenz y Arriaga, 76, Mexican Catholic priest who was excommunicated in 1972 for his advocacy of sedevacantism and denial of authority of the Pope

== April 29, 1976 (Thursday) ==
- A concealed bomb exploded at the gates of the Soviet Union Embassy in China. The bomb, intended for embassy staff, killed four Chinese people. The incident had a major detrimental effect on Sino-Soviet relations. China blamed the blast on a Chinese "counterrevolutionary saboteur."
- Dmitri Ustinov, a civilian, was appointed as the new Soviet Minister of Defense to replace Marshal Andrei Grechko.
- Pak Song-chol, the former North Korean Foreign Minister, was named as the new Premier of North Korea by the Communist nation's Supreme Leader Kim Il Sung, replacing Kim Il, who was promoted to Deputy Chairman of the North Korean Communist Party and to Vice President of North Korea.
- A handwritten Last Will and Testament, purportedly made by the recently deceased billionaire Howard Hughes, was delivered by a lawyer for the Church of Jesus Christ of Latter Day Saints (commonly referred to as the Mormons) to the Clark County Court Clerk in Las Vegas, Nevada, along with a statement that the Will "happened to appear mysteriously two days ago on a desk in a church office." The purported will identified several institutions to receive bequests, as well as four specifically named individuals and various groups of people.
- Former U.S. Vice President Hubert Humphrey, who had been viewed among Democrats as a dark horse nominee to break a possible deadlock for the Democratic Party nomination for the 1976 U.S. presidential election, announced at a news conference that he would not campaign for the nomination, nor enter any presidential primaries.
- An annular solar eclipse took place. Annularity was visible from North Africa, Greece, Turkey, Middle East, central Asia, India and China, occurring just two days after the point where the Moon was at its furthest distance (apogee) from the Earth.
- The two sons and daughter-in-law of Ana González de Recabarren were arrested by the DINA, Chile's secret police; her husband Manuel Recabarren was arrested the next day, and she would never see any of them again. The tragedy would lead her to become a leading human rights activist in Chile to lobby on behalf of other families of the desparecidos who vanished during the regime of Augusto Pinochet.
- Born:
  - Peter Spierig and Michael Spirig, German-born Australian horror film producers known for Daybreakers and Winchester: The House That Ghosts Built; in Buchholz in der Nordheide, West Germany
  - Yevgeny Sandro, Russian politician and Director of Rossotrudnichestvo, the Russian cultural exchange and civilian foreign aid agency within the Russian Foreign Affairs Ministry; in Moscow
- Died:
  - Munawar Zarif, 35, Pakistani film actor and comedian; from cirrhosis of the liver
  - LJ Hooker, 72, Australian real estate magnate and philanthropist
  - Hedwig Göldner Samuel, 82, German philanthropist and co-founder of the Hedwig and Robert Samuel Foundation
  - Mel Rhodes, 59, American educator known for proposing "The 4 Ps of Creativity" (person, process, press and product)

== April 30, 1976 (Friday) ==
- The controversial "Greek language question" (Γλωσσικό ζήτημα, glossiko zitimea) was decided the Parliament of Greece with the implementation of Article 2 of Law 309. The law provided that, in official government documents and public educational instruction shall use Demotic Greek ("Demotiki"), the modern colloquial form of the Greek language used by most of the population of Greece, rather than "Katharevousa" an updated version of Ancient Greek that had been used in literature and government documents.
- A deported Turkish migrant worker hijacked a Turkish Airlines Douglas DC-10-10 after take-off from Orly Airport, Paris. He demanded to be flown to Marseille or Lyon, but the plane returned to Orly, where he surrendered. The 264 people on board were released unharmed.
- The Icelandic Coast Guard patrol vessel ICGV Óðinn was rammed by the British fishing trawler Arctic Corsair in one of the more violent confrontations in the "Cod Wars" over fishing rights in the North Atlantic Ocean.
- World heavyweight boxing champion Muhammad Ali narrowly defended his title in a bout against challenger Jimmy Young. When the three judges' decision after the 15-round bout was unanimously in favor of Ali, the crowd at the Capital Centre in Landover, Maryland booed and the ABC TV network received calls of protest. Ali conceded afterward that he was overweight and that he had underestimated Young, a 15 to 1 underdog in betting.
- Rock music singer Bruce Springsteen, touring in the Memphis area of Tennessee, tried to gain admission to Elvis Presley's mansion, "Graceland", by climbing a wall. Security guards told him that Elvis was out of town and escorted him off the premises.
