= Lauren Elder =

American artist and designer (born 1946)

- Born: 1946 (age 79–80); Portland, Oregon, U.S.
- Education: UCLA, UCB Extension

Lauren Elder (born 1946) is an American artist, designer, and environmental activist known for environmental works and performative collaborations.

== Life and work ==
Lauren Elder was born in Portland, Oregon, in 1946. She has a BA in Fine Arts from UCLA. She also studied Landscape Architecture at UCB Extension. Throughout the mid-1980s to early 1990s she worked with the interdisciplinary performance ensemble, Contraband, as a set designer and performer. Elder lives and works in California, taught at California College of the Arts, and works with environmental art, as well as continuing in set design. Elder is known for being the sole survivor in the crash of a light airplane in the Sierra Nevada in the 1970s.

=== Theater Works ===
In collaboration with the San Francisco based performance collective, Contraband, Elder produced the performance piece Oracle in 1988. Elder created "an 'industrial,' kinetic visual environment" in which the dancers explored issues of freedom and imprisonment.

Singing My Mother to Sleep (1988) is a collaboration with performance artist Nina Wise. This performance explores issues of grief, mortality, and personal catharsis, using the threat of extinction to endangered animals as a metaphor. The performance takes place in a hospital room with large images of animals projected onto the hospital privacy screen.

Maria Porges writes of Elder's 1993 production Surrender in Artforum, "Although billed as environmental theater, Lauren Elder's immensely ambitious multidisciplinary performances encompass far more than mere drama. Like her earlier work Off Limits, 1989, Surrender is a sprawling, archetypal story with a narrative thread that twists into knots at times, guiding the audience from event to dream to memory, but always wandering back to the story at hand. This temporal movement is echoed by the frequent physical relocation of both players and audience in and around the hangar-sized space of the theater. Surrender also shifts from spoken text to singing, chanting, and instrumental interludes."

Porges continues, "From the first, Surrender drew in the audience, making it clear that the questions being asked were ones that all of us will have to find an answer for, sooner or later, within ourselves. These issues range from war resistance to wartime killing, from the loss and loneliness experienced by the families of soldiers, to the effects of radiation on the flora and fauna of the desert." AND "Even more compelling than the story they told, though, was the visual design of the piece as a whole. Elder's inventions, more sculpture and installation than “props” or “sets,” derived their power from a kind of can-do simplicity, rather than from gee-whiz high-tech effects. (A nighttime sky of stars, for instance, was represented by a huge dome-shaped mobile of bent bicycle wheels, all set in motion by the astronomer's hand.) From one moment to the next, her objects and environments simultaneously spun the fantasy and confronted the audience with difficult truths."

=== Publications ===
- Design as Democracy, Techniques for Collective Creativity, Edited by De La Pena et al., Island Press, 2018
- Glance Magazine, CCA, Fall, 2014
- Do Not Destroy: Trees, Art and Jewish Thought, Contemporary Jewish Museum, San Francisco, CA, 2012. ISBN 978-0615251448
- Asphalt to Ecosystems, School Yard Transformation, Sharon Danks, New Village Press, 2010
- Urban Homesteading, Kaplan and Blume, Skyhorse Press, 2011. ISBN 9781626368507

=== Awards & Distinctions ===
- NEA Interdisciplinary Arts (1983, 1984, 1988)
- Eureka Fellowship for Sculpture (1989)
- Isadora Duncan Award, Best Visual Design (1987, 1990, 2000/01)
- Potrero Nuevo Environmental Award (2001, 2004, 2005)
- 2017 Water Rights Residency, Santa Fe Art Institute

== 1976 plane crash ==
On April 26, 1976, Lauren Elder decided to take up an offer to be the third passenger in a Cessna 182P, tail number N52855, on a trip from Oakland International Airport in Oakland, California to Furnace Creek Airport in Death Valley's Furnace Creek. Dr. Jay M. Fuller, the 36-year-old pilot and Elder's boyfriend's coworker, had 213 flight hours (46 on type) experience and was not instrument rated. He probably flew east, up Bubbs Creek and sought but missed Kearsarge Pass (11,709 ft or 3,569 m) through the Sierra. Instead, he flew southeast into Center Basin, the eastern side which is ringed by three peaks over 13,000 feet (4,000 m) tall (Mt. Bradley at 13,289 feet (4,050 m), Mt. Keith at 13,977 feet (4,260 m), and Junction Peak at 13,888 feet (4,233 m)). Elder, sitting in the back seat and enjoying the view of mountains all round, turned forward to see a wall of granite moving towards them. When she woke up, she realized that they had crashed. The crumpled plane was lying on a precarious slope a few feet away from a ridge in California's Sierra Nevada at an elevation of 12,460 feet (3,800 m), one-half mile south of Mt. Bradley.

Fuller and his girlfriend, Jean Kathrine Noller, another passenger who had been sitting in the front of the airplane, initially survived the crash but both died by the following morning. The evening of the accident, Elder could see the lights of the Owens Valley below, but miles of wilderness, elevation and sheer, icy cliffs separated her from it. She was wearing nothing but a blouse, a wraparound skirt, and boots with two-inch heels. One of her arms was fractured. The morning following the accident, with both Fuller and Noller deceased and no real possibility of rescue, Elder decided to climb down from the mountain to the valley below. At one point, it was necessary to lower herself down a 100-foot-tall dry waterfall. She suffered from hallucinations on the way because of lack of sleep and shock. Her descent took 36 hours.

Finally, as Elder reached civilization, she had trouble finding help when she walked late that night into the town of Independence, California. People saw her disheveled appearance and were afraid; Charles Manson and his female followers had lived at the Barker Ranch in Inyo County, California seven years earlier and were arrested there in 1969 after the Tate—LaBianca murders, and members of the Manson Family had appeared at the preliminary hearing that took place in Independence before trial was transferred to Los Angeles.

Lauren Elder wrote a book about the crash (with Shirley Streshinsky) entitled And I Alone Survived, which was later made into a TV movie with the same title, as well as a documentary aired by the Discovery Channel.

The National Transportation Safety Board (NTSB) ruled the accident was caused by the pilot in command (PIC), who "continued flight into known areas of severe turbulence." The NTSB also judged the PIC made "improper in-flight decisions or planning." The National Park Service continues to remove pieces of wreckage from Elder's flight. There have been nearly a dozen private and military airplane crashes in the immediate vicinity.
