= 2025 South Carolina wildfires =

Natural disasters in the USA

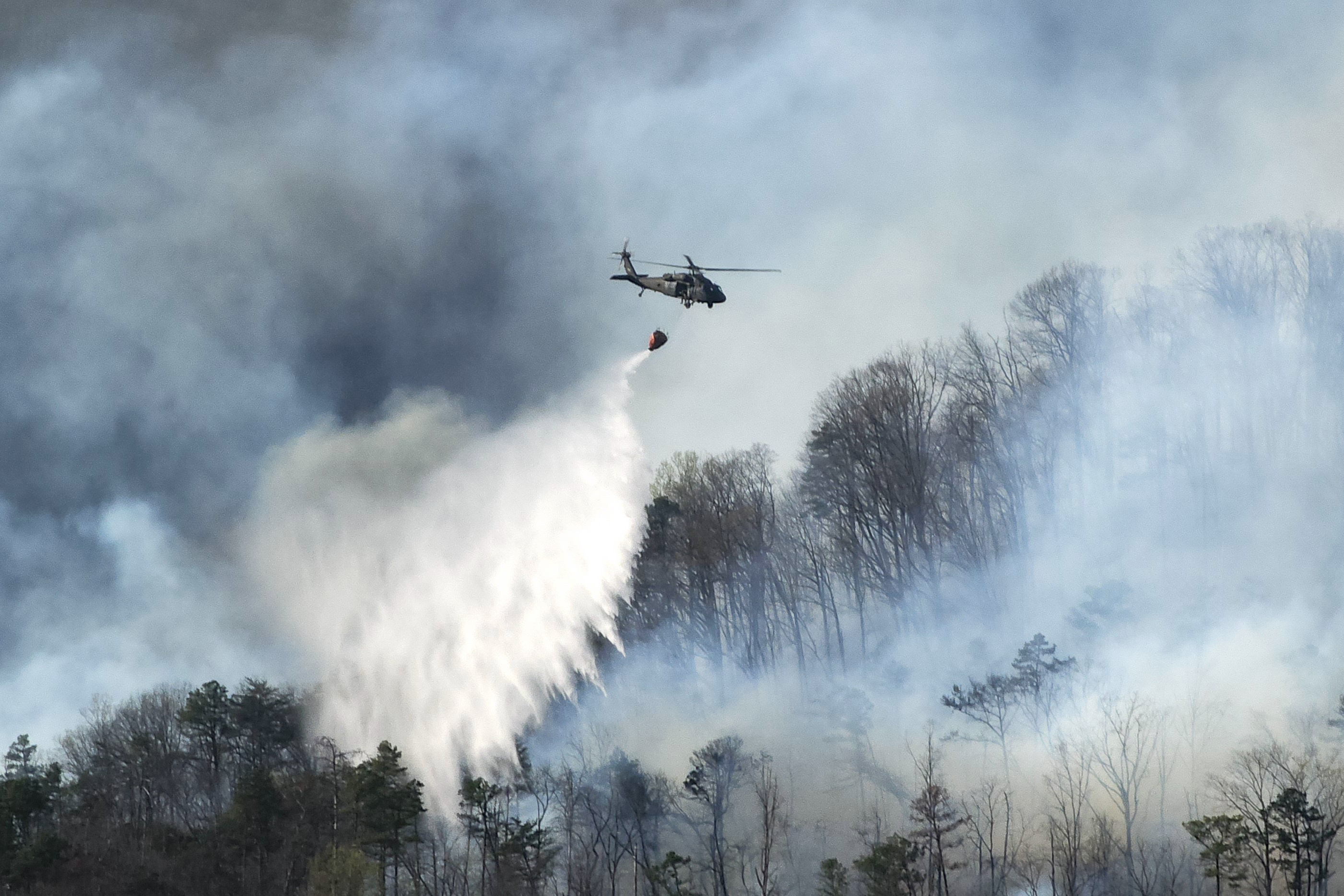
- A South Carolina Army National Guard helicopter conducts aerial water-bucket operations on the Table Rock and Persimmon Ridge wildfires in Pickens County, S.C., March 23, 2025.

The 2025 South Carolina wildfires were a series of wildfires that burned in the U.S. state of South Carolina.

== Background ==
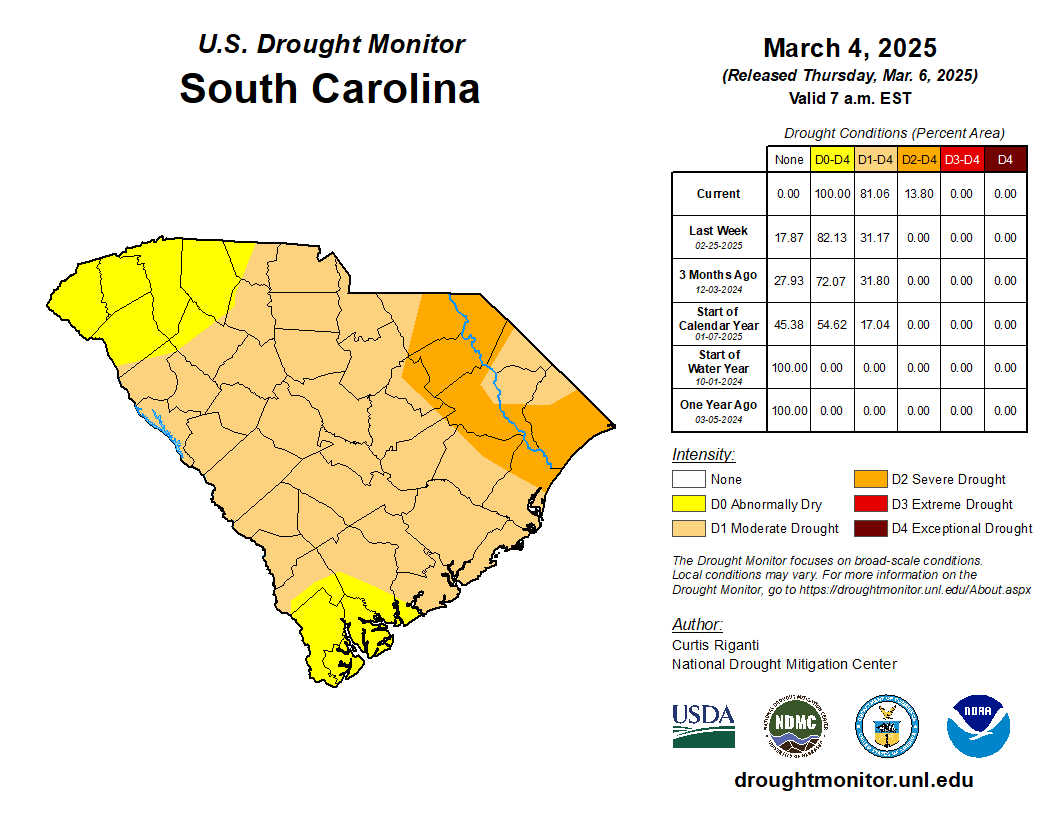
South Carolina Drought Monitor on March 4, 2025

Historically, South Carolina’s wildfire season typically peaks in late winter through early spring—approximately from January to mid-April—when dry vegetation, low humidity, and seasonal wind patterns create heightened fire risk. March, in particular, tends to be the most active month for wildfire incidents.

A report by South Carolina Public Radio notes that the driest months fall during the winter, and that winter and early spring see the most severe wildfire threats—driven by drought development, persistent dry air, and cold-front-associated wind events that lower humidity and accelerate fuel ignition. These conditions often lead to the issuance of Red Flag Warnings across the state.

The South Carolina Forestry Commission’s wildfire facts page also confirms that late winter through early spring is the usual period of elevated wildfire activity, with March being historically the most active month.

Contributing factors to ignition include escaped debris burns, which are cited as the leading cause of ignitions across the state. Other common causes are equipment use (e.g., dragging chains), arson, sparking power lines, campfires, and occasionally lightning strikes.

Annual wildfire statistics show that fire response crews typically deal with about 1,300 wildfires, burning more than 8,000 acres statewide each year. The largest fire on record occurred in April 1976, when approximately 30,000 acres burned in Horry County.

== Affects by county ==
=== Horry County ===
One of the most significant wildfires affected the Carolina Forest area near Myrtle Beach in Horry County, South Carolina. By the morning of March 2, 2025, this fire had consumed over 1,200 acres and remained completely uncontained. The blaze threatened the residential neighborhoods of Avalon, Spring Lake, Walker Woods, and Waterford, as well as homes within the Myrtle Beach city limits, necessitating evacuation orders for affected areas. Fire authorities reported that the rapid spread was fueled by wind gusts reaching up to 40 mph combined with extremely dry conditions.

A separate wildfire erupted north of Carolina Forest, burning over than 300 acres by March 2. Fire officials reported that this blaze was also burning out of control with no containment achieved in the initial response phase.

=== Georgetown County ===
Approximately 35 miles to the south of Myrtle Beach, a significant wildfire began on March 1 in Georgetown County, South Carolina. This fire threatened several homes in the town of Prince George, requiring evacuations. By the morning of March 2, the fire had spread to over 800 acres. The Prince George Fire reportedly occurred in the vicinity of the Arcadia Plantation, an area where firefighters had conducted a controlled burn earlier in the week.

=== Greenville County ===
In northern Greenville County, South Carolina, a wildfire in Persimmon Ridge, near Caesar's Head, was first reported on March 23. By March 28, the wildfire had spread to 1,992 acres, with 0% containment. Evacuation orders were issued for affected areas. By April 7, the wildfire had spread to 2,128 acres, with 99% containment.

The Persimmon Ridge fire is part of the greater Table Rock Complex fire, along with the Table Rock Fire in Pickens County. The total acreage of the Table Rock Complex fire, as of April 7, is 15,973 acres, with 100% containment. Rainfall and calmer wind conditions have aided containment efforts.

=== Pickens County ===
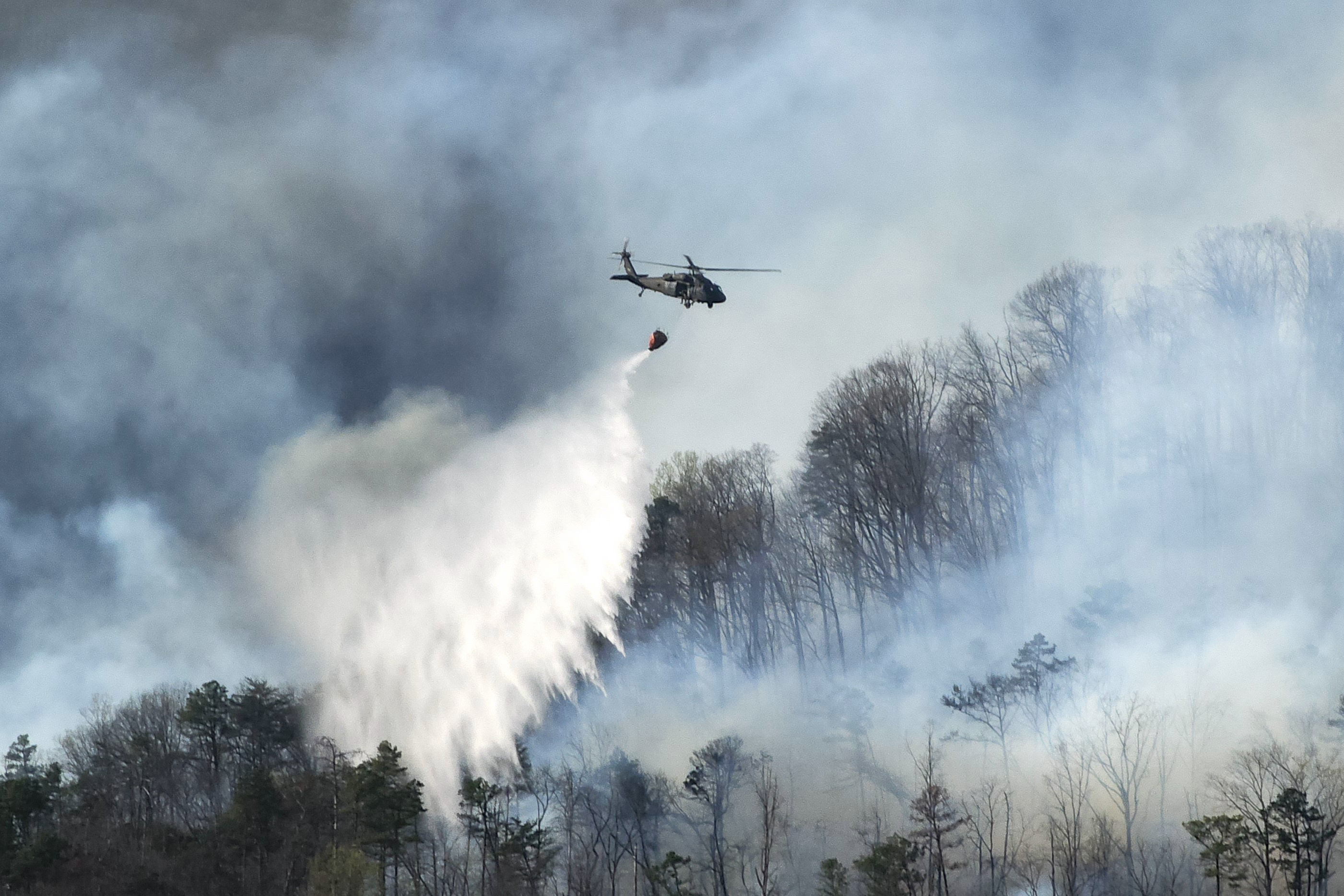
A South Carolina Army National Guard helicopter conducts aerial water-bucket operations on the Table Rock and Persimmon Ridge wildfires in Pickens County, S.C., March 23, 2025.

In Pickens County, South Carolina, a wildfire in the Six Mile Mountain area necessitated evacuations on March 2. Emergency responders quickly mobilized to prevent the fire from reaching residential structures. By March 2, the Six Mile Mountain Fire had burned nearly 300 acres but was reported to be 85% contained.

A separate wildfire was reported in Table Rock State Park on March 22. The Table Rock fire was reportedly human-caused, due to 'negligence' by hikers, potentially during a Red Flag Warning by the South Carolina Forestry Commission. By March 26, the wildfire had spread to 4,556 acres, with 0% containment. Additionally, some parts of the fire had spread across state lines into Transylvania County, North Carolina. On March 29, the wildfire became the largest, single mountain fire in the history of South Carolina and the Upstate region of the state. On March 30, the wildfire had spread to 10,894 acres in South Carolina and 574 acres in North Carolina. As of April 7, The wildfire had an acreage of 13,210 and was reported to be 91% contained.

The Table Rock fire is part of the greater Table Rock Complex fire, including the Table Rock fire in Pickens County and the Persimmon Ridge fire in Greenville County. By March 28, the Table Rock Complex fire had a total area of 10,671 acres. Additionally, mandatory evacuations orders for areas in Greenville and Pickens County were expanded as the fires continue to spread. On March 31, the statewide burning ban was lifted for all counties except for the counties of Greenville, Horry, Oconee, Pickens, and Spartanburg. By April 7, the Table Rock Complex fire was 15,973 acres at 97% containment, with containment being aided by rainfall and calmer wind conditions.

== List of wildfires ==
The following is a list of fires that burned more than 1,000 acres (400 ha), produced significant structural damage, or resulted in casualties.

Name	County	Acres	Start date	Containment date (Note: Containment means that fire crews have established and secured control lines around the fire's perimeter. These lines are artificial barriers, like trenches or cleared vegetation, designed to stop the fire's spread, or natural barriers like rivers. Containment reflects progress in managing the fire but does not necessarily mean the fire is starved of fuel, under control, or put out.)	Notes	Ref
Covington Drive Compact	Horry	2,059	March 2	May 22		
Table Rock Complex	Greenville, Pickens	15,973	March 22	April 7	The Table Rock Fire is 13,210 acres, and the Persimmon Ridge Fire is 2,128 acres.	

Perimeters of wildfires in South Carolina during 2025 (Red: >1000 acres) (map data)

== See also ==
- 2025 United States wildfires
