= Mount Keith =

Mountain in the American state of California

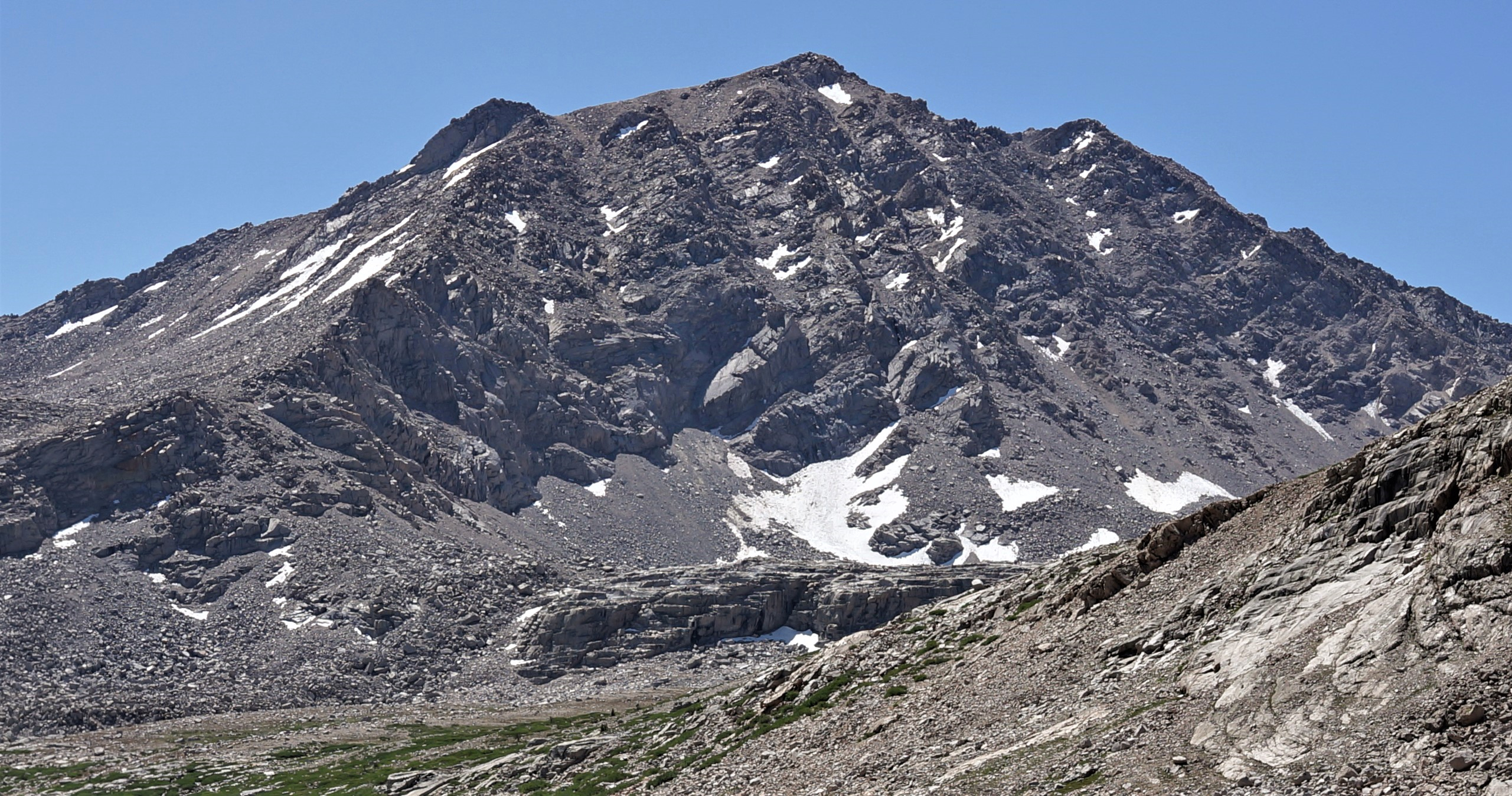

Highest point
- Elevation: 13,982 ft (4,262 m) NAVD 88
- Prominence: 1,903 ft (580 m)
- Parent peak: Mount Whitney
- Isolation: 3.09 mi (4.97 km)
- Listing: North America highest peaks 63rd; U.S. highest major peaks 48th; California highest major peaks 7th; Sierra Peaks Section Emblem peak; Western States Climbers Star peak
- Coordinates: 36°42′00″N 118°20′37″W

Geography
- Location within California
- Location: Inyo and Tulare counties, California, U.S.
- Parent range: Sierra Nevada
- Topo map: USGS Mount Williamson

Climbing
- First ascent: 1898, by Cornelius Beach Bradley, Jennie E. Price, Robert M. Price and Joseph C. Shinn
- Easiest route: Simple Scramble, class 2 by Northwest Face, South Face or Northeast Slopes

Mount Keith is a mountain on the crest of California's Sierra Nevada, between Mount Bradley to the north, and Junction Peak to the southwest. Its north and west facing slopes feed the Kings River watershed by way of Bubbs Creek, and its east and south slopes feed the Owens River via Shepherd Creek. By the same dividing line, Keith stands on the boundary of Kings Canyon National Park to the northwest, and the John Muir Wilderness to the southeast. It is a thirteener, a mountain which has a height over 13000 feet.

The peak was named for artist and Sierra Club member, William Keith, by Helen Gompertz (later Helen LeConte) in July 1896.

The first ascending party consisted of Cornelius Beach Bradley, Jennie and Robert Price, and Joseph Shinn. Scrambling over boulders and scree from the upper lakes of Center Basin, they made the summit by the Northwest Face route on July 6, 1898.

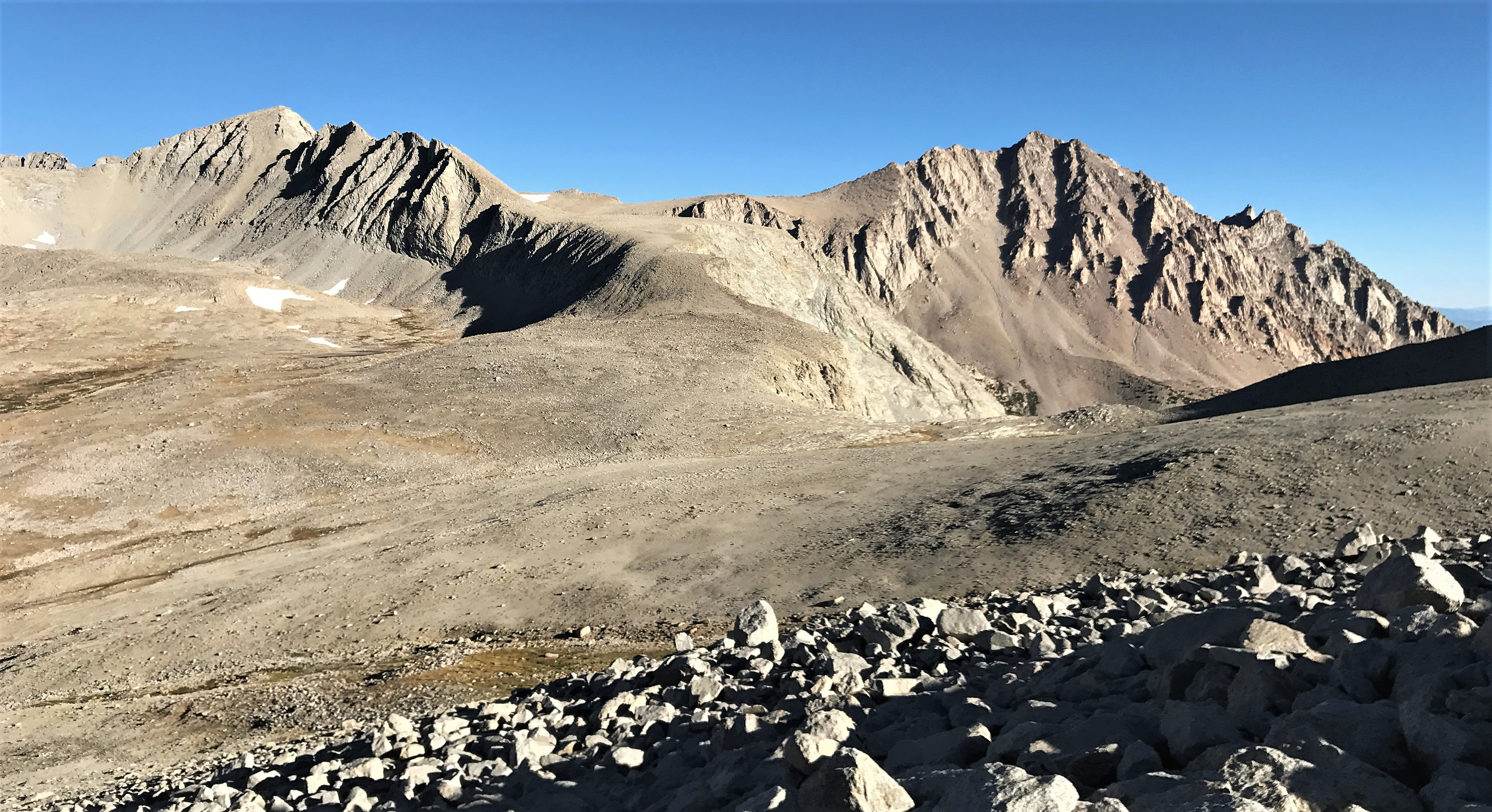
Junction Peak (left) and Mt. Keith (right) from the south

== See also ==
- List of mountain peaks of California
