= 1976 Mahoran status referendum =

A referendum on remaining an overseas Territory was held in Mayotte on 11 April 1976, after the proposal of remaining part of the Comoros was overwhelmingly rejected in a referendum in February.

Around 80% of the 17,384 votes cast were blank or invalid, largely by those who wished Mayotte to become a French department, a choice not offered in the referendum. Of the valid votes, 97% rejected the proposal.

== Results ==
Choice	Votes	%
For	90	2.54
Against	3,457	97.46
Total	3,547	100.00
Valid votes	3,547	20.40
Invalid/blank votes	13,837	79.60
Total votes	17,384	100.00
Registered voters/turnout	21,659	80.26
Source: Direct Democracy
