= 1976 Gubir helicopter shootdown =

1976 attack in Malaysia

Gubir shootdown
- Part of Operation Gubir 2 of the Second Emergency
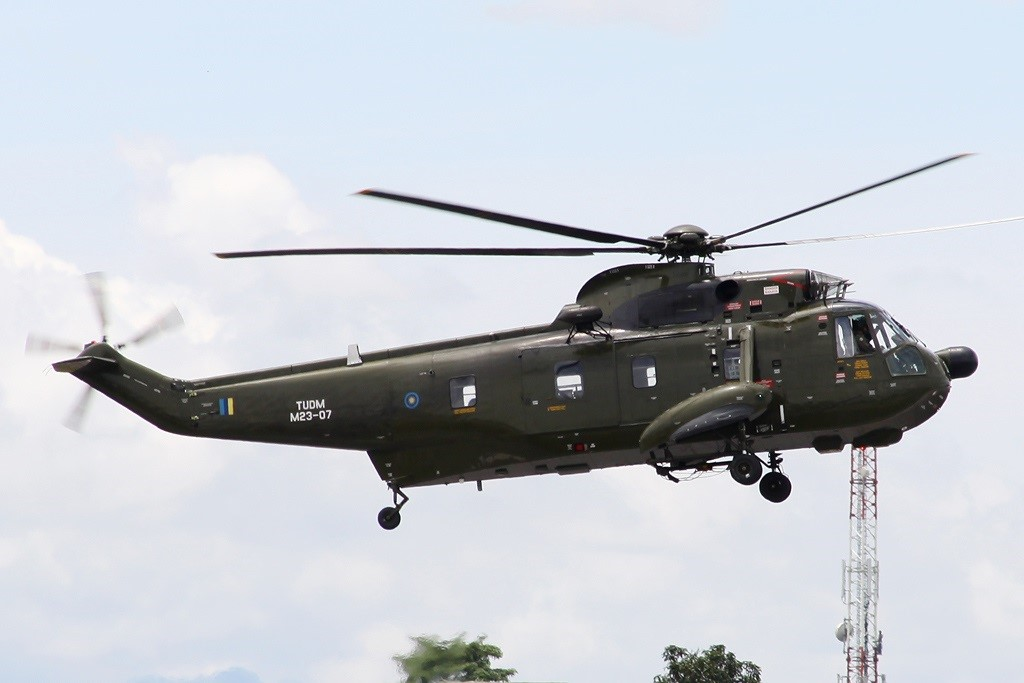
- A Sikorsky S-61A-4 Nuri of the RMAF, c. 2009, similar to the one involved in the incident.
| Date | 26 April 1976 |
| Location | Gubir, Sik District, Kedah 6.1420°N 100.8503°E |
| Result | Communist victory |

Belligerents
| Malaysia | Communist Party of Malaya |

Commanders and leaders
| Chung Ming Teck †; Wan Munsiff Wan Salim † | No centralised leadership |

Units involved
| RMAF | MNLA |

Strength
| 1 helicopter; 14 soldiers (3 on ground) | Unknown |

Casualties and losses
| 11 killed; 3 injured | None |

On 26 April 1976, during a counter-insurgency operation conducted by the Malaysian government against guerrilla fighters from the Malayan Communist Party, a Sikorsky S-61A-4 Nuri helicopter operated by the Royal Malaysian Air Force (RMAF) was shot down by insurgents in forest reserves near the village of Gubir in Sik, Kedah. The incident killed all 11 people on board the aircraft. It was the first time guerrillas shot down an aircraft throughout the Malayan Emergency and subsequent communist insurgency in Malaysia and represented the first personnel killed in action in RMAF history.

== Background ==
In 1968, the Sikorsky S-61A-4 Nuri helicopter, a variant of the Sikorsky SH-3 Sea King, was in service by the Royal Malaysian Air Force (RMAF). On 26 October 1970, the RMAF purchased 40 Nuri helicopters for troop transport, cargo carrying and rescue mission purposes.

=== Communist insurgent strategies, 1960s ===
Between 1968 and 1989, Malaysia was involved in a low-intensity armed insurgency from the Malayan National Liberation Army (MNLA), the military wing of the banned Communist Party of Malaya (CPM), as a continuation of the Malayan Emergency from 1948 to 1960. Helicopters, notably the Nuri, were deployed in action soon after their introduction, serving casevacs against the insurgency as early as 18 June 1968.

Unlike the Emergency, where helicopters were not made a target, the MNLA now trained some of its insurgents to shoot down helicopters, which posed a threat to the Nuri aircrew. The first insurgent attack against a Nuri occurred on 6 August 1969, when a Nuri was shot during a final approach near Sadao, Thailand. A second attack happened on 22 December 1974, when a Nuri conducting a casevac near Weng, Baling was shot, forcing the helicopter to take off while its casualty was still hanging outside the aircraft.

== History ==
=== Operation Gubir 2 ===
The Ulu Muda forests surrounding the village of Gubir in Sik, Kedah, became a defensive stronghold of the MNLA during the insurgency and was even reported to have housed Chin Peng, the secretary general of the CPM. Estimates by security officials believed guerrilla camps around Gubir could accommodate between 400 and 500 insurgents. To neutralise the insurgency near Gubir, a special operation, Operation Gubir 2, was launched near the village on 15 April 1976. Its main mission was to capture an MNLA training camp codenamed Target Bravo, which contained an underground tunnel network near the Malaysian–Thailand border. The operation came in the form of an airborne assault as preventive measures against booby traps set around the site. Three Nuri helicopters were deployed for the insertion of commandos and its planned extraction.

On 17 April, as preparations for the assault, the site was gradually bombarded and strafed by a combination of artillery fire and aerial support. The assault began after the bombardment ended, but during the approach towards Target Bravo, the helicopter fleet was attacked by MNLA insurgents and was forced to abort the mission. The commandos' assault returned on 21 April 1976 and was successful in capturing the camp without any opposition, even though three commandos were injured by booby traps and were evacuated to Alor Setar.

=== Shoot down of FM1715 ===
On 25 April 1976, while stationing at Target Bravo, an ambush from the MNLA killed a soldier and injured another. To counter the attacks, an RMAF Nuri helicopter (registration FM1715) was dispatched on 26 April to transport supplies and reinforcements to the encampment. The aircraft was piloted by flight lieutenant Chung Ming Teck and flight lieutenant Wan Munsiff Wan Salim of the RMAF 10th Squadron and carried 11 people, including seven RMAF officers. At 10:23 am, while flying low and preparing to land troops on Target Bravo, the aircraft was struck by small arms fire from MNLA insurgents, and within two minutes contact from FM1715 was lost. The aircraft caught on fire, and was found to have executed an overshoot but crashed while evacuating the landing site.

Further firefights between the insurgents and the troops on the ground injured another three soldiers. Rescue parties were immediately dispatched following FM1715's disappearance but did not locate the wreckage until the morning of 27 April. The bodies of all personnel were burnt beyond recognition, with some body parts scattered across the crash site. Only two bodies were properly identified–they were the first to be buried on 28 April, while the remaining bodies were buried on 29 April.

== Aftermath ==
The shootdown near Gubir was the first instance where guerrillas shot down an aircraft throughout the communist insurgency in Malaysia since 1948. Mokhtar Hashim, the deputy minister of defence, represented prime minister Hussein Onn on expressing their condolences to the casualties of the attack.

Operation Gubir 2 ended on 1 May 1976 as a success, with all intended targets, primarily MNLA guerrilla camps, disabled and destroyed. Over 3,000 soldiers were involved in the operation and captured three jungle communist camps. The last troops stationed at Gubir were extracted on 3 May, concluding the operation after 19 days. The situation at Gubir, with almost 300 guerrilla fighters still hiding in the forests, and the general rise of violence in the insurgency, was among the factors that prompted Hussein Onn to order the expansion of the Malaysian Armed Forces by 30,000 men in mid-1976. The remaining Nuri helicopters would serve the RMAF until they were phased out in the 2020s.

== See also ==
- Operation Termite
- Bukit Kepong incident
- 2024 Lumut mid-air collision
