= Leslie Porterfield =

American motorcycle racer

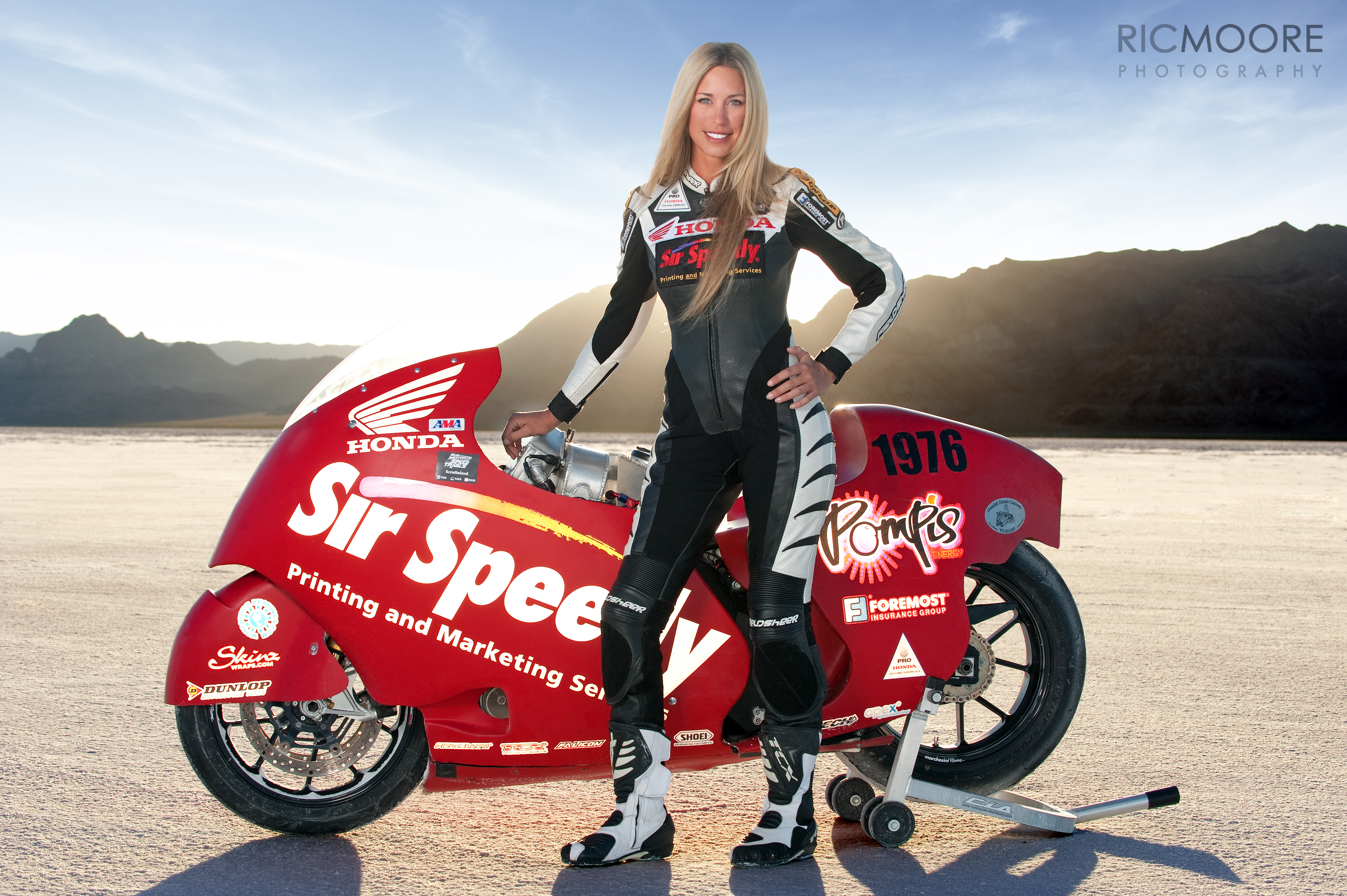
- Porterfield on the Bonneville Salt Flats
- Nationality: American
- Born: Dallas, Texas, U.S.

Leslie Porterfield is an American motorcycle racer. She was named as the 2008 American Motorcyclist Association (AMA) Racing Female Rider of the Year, holds three land-speed records and is a member of the Bonneville 200 mph club. She is the former co-owner of High Five Cycles with Ronnie Trent, a used motorcycle dealership in north Dallas. She has been riding and racing motorcycles since her mid-teens. She was born on April 16, 1976.

Porterfield was previously the Guinness Book of World Records' "Fastest conventional motorcycle speed (female)" with her land speed record of 374.208 km/h (232.522 mph) set at Bonneville Speedway in 2008. That record was broken in 2019 and is now held by Erin Sills at 381.857 km/h (237.275 mph).

The trials and tribulations of obtaining her record at Speedweek were documented for the Discovery Channel show "Speed Capital of the World: Bonneville".

Porterfield is writing for Motorbikes India online magazine.
