= Gloria Spencer =

American singer (1937–1976)

- Promotional photo of Gloria Spencer from the jacket of her 1976 album For Once In My Life

Background information
- Also known as: Gloria Gray
- Born: Gloria Christine Spencer; March 18, 1937; Steelton, Pennsylvania, U.S.
- Died: April 2, 1976 (aged 39) Charlotte, North Carolina, U.S.
- Genres: Gospel
- Occupation: Singer
- Instruments: Vocals, piano
- Years active: 1972–1976
- Labels: Jaywalking Records; Creed Records

Gloria Spencer (March 18, 1937 – April 2, 1976) was an American gospel singer who was billed as the "World's Largest Gospel Singer"in the world due to a glandular condition that caused her to weigh 625 pounds (283 kg). Over the course of her four-year career, Spencer released only two albums. She was noted for her "sparkling soprano that could easily show a pop feeling or a gritty one." Spencer died of congestive heart failure in April 1976.

== Early life ==
Spencer was born in Steelton, Pennsylvania in 1937. She and her two sisters were all born with a thyroid glandular condition that led to rapid weight gain. As an adult, Spencer stood 5 ft 3 in (1.60 m) and weighed 625 pounds (283 kg).

She began singing church solos at the age of three and taught herself to play the piano shortly thereafter.

== Recording career ==
After Spencer graduated from high school, she worked as typist at the capital in Harrisburg, Pennsylvania during the week (she reportedly typed 115 words a minute). On the weekends, she toured the East Coast singing gospel music. In the early 1970s, Spencer was signed to Jaywalking Records. Her debut album, Gloria's Views of Glory, was released in 1972. In 2007, the album was reissued online as a digital download by Perfect Records and re-titled, I Got It. Her second album, For Once In My Life, was released in 1976 on Creed Records. The Creed Records release contained a mix of gospel standards and new works, including standards like "Amazing Grace". Her rendition of the gospel standard "I'll Fly Away" is preceded by a spoken word introduction wherein Spencer describes the funeral of her older sister, who died weighing 628 pounds (285 kg).

Spencer's handlers at Creed Records came up with the idea of promoting her as the "World's Largest Gospel Singer" as a way of gaining interest and attention. She often told stories to media outlets designed to gain interest based on her weight; among them were the story that she required three airline seats in order to fly and that she once had a piano bench break underneath her during a performance. (She told the Gospel News Journal in 1972 that she "kept right on playing - from the floor.")

== Personal life and death ==
While touring, Spencer met Reverend David Gray, a counselor at Kittrell College. They were married on December 31, 1973 at the Macedonia Baptist Church in Harrisburg. Gray was supportive of Spencer's career and often accompanied her on the road.

Spencer died of congestive heart failure on April 2, 1976.

At the time of her death, Spencer weighed 797 pounds (362 kg). Her two-day viewing and funeral were held at the Macedonia Baptist Church in Harrisburg, the same church Spencer and her husband were married. Then Harrisburg mayor Harold A. Swenson attended Spencer's funeral while Shirley Caesar performed "Stand By Me". Seventeen pallbearers were needed to carry Spencer's 82 inches (210 cm) wide casket.

== Bibliography ==
1. Gloria's Views of Glory, Jaywalking Records, 1972
2. For Once In My Life, Nashboro Records, 1976
3. I Got It (Digital Re-issue of 1972 recording), Perfect Records, 2007
4. Carpenter, Bill (2005). Uncloudy Days: The Gospel Music Encyclopedia. Backbeat Books. ISBN 0879308419.
