= Mount Bradley (Inyo County, California) =

Summit in Inyo and Tulare counties, California, United States

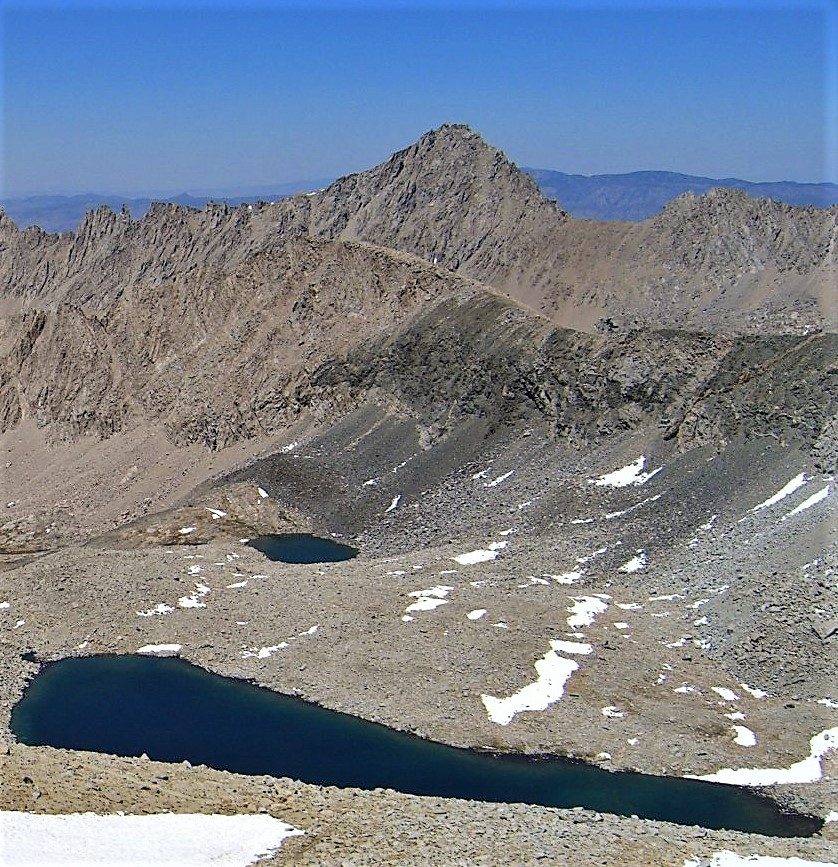
- Mt. Bradley from Forester Pass

Highest point
- Elevation: 13,270 ft (4,045 m) NAVD 88
- Prominence: 797 ft (243 m)
- Parent peak: Mount Keith
- Listing: Sierra Peaks Section; Vagmarken Club Sierra Crest List
- Coordinates: 36°43′43″N 118°20′19″W

Geography
- Location within California
- Location: Kings Canyon National Park; Inyo / Tulare counties, California, U.S.
- Parent range: Sierra Nevada
- Topo map: USGS Mount Williamson

Climbing
- First ascent: 1898 by Robert Price, J. Shinn and Lola Harris
- Easiest route: Simple scramble class 2

Mount Bradley is a summit in Inyo and Tulare counties, California, in the United States and is in the Kings Canyon National Park. With an elevation of 13,270 feet (4,045 m), Mount Bradley is the 95th highest summit in the state of California.

Mount Bradley was named for Cornelius B. Bradley, a professor at the University of California.
