= Junction Peak =

Mountain in California, United States

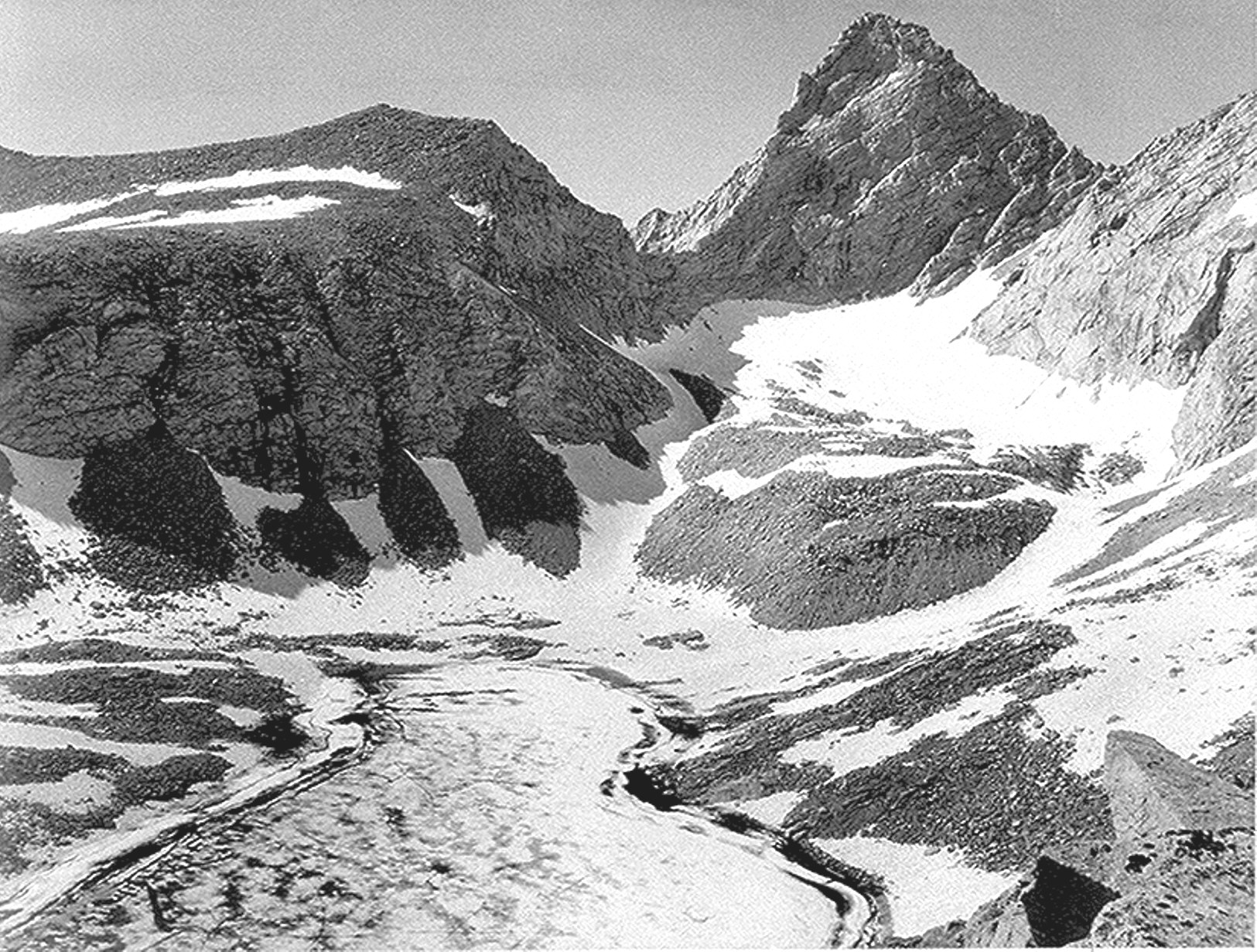
- "Junction Peak" by Ansel Adams, circa 1930s.

Highest point
- Elevation: 13,894 ft (4,235 m) NAVD 88
- Prominence: 765 ft (233 m)
- Parent peak: Mount Stanford
- Listing: SPS Mountaineers peak; Western States Climbers Star peak
- Coordinates: 36°41′24″N 118°21′56″W

Geography
- Location within California Location within the United States
- Location: Kings Canyon National Park; Sequoia National Park; John Muir Wilderness; Inyo / Tulare counties California, U.S.
- Parent range: Sierra Nevada
- Topo map: USGS Mount Williamson

Climbing
- First ascent: August 8, 1899 by Edwin Bingham Copeland, Ernest Norton Henderson and Maxwell Adams
- Easiest route: South Face, South Ridge or West Ridge (all class 3 scrambles)

Junction Peak is a thirteener in the Sierra Nevada. Joseph Nisbet LeConte chose this name in 1896, noting that it marks the point where the Sierra Crest crosses the water divide of the Kern and Kings rivers. Today it also is the boundary between Inyo and Tulare counties, and of Kings Canyon National Park, Sequoia National Park and the John Muir Wilderness.

Botanist Edwin Bingham Copeland and Chico Normal School colleagues Ernest Norton Henderson and Maxwell Adams made the first recorded ascent of Junction Peak on August 8, 1899. They are credited with pioneering the class 3 South Ridge route from Diamond Mesa to the summit. Over the course of nearly a century, several more class 3 and 4 routes were established. The first winter climb was made by the West Ridge, culminating on March 21, 1973. The first technical climb recorded on Junction was the grade III 5.7 North Buttress route.

== Gallery ==
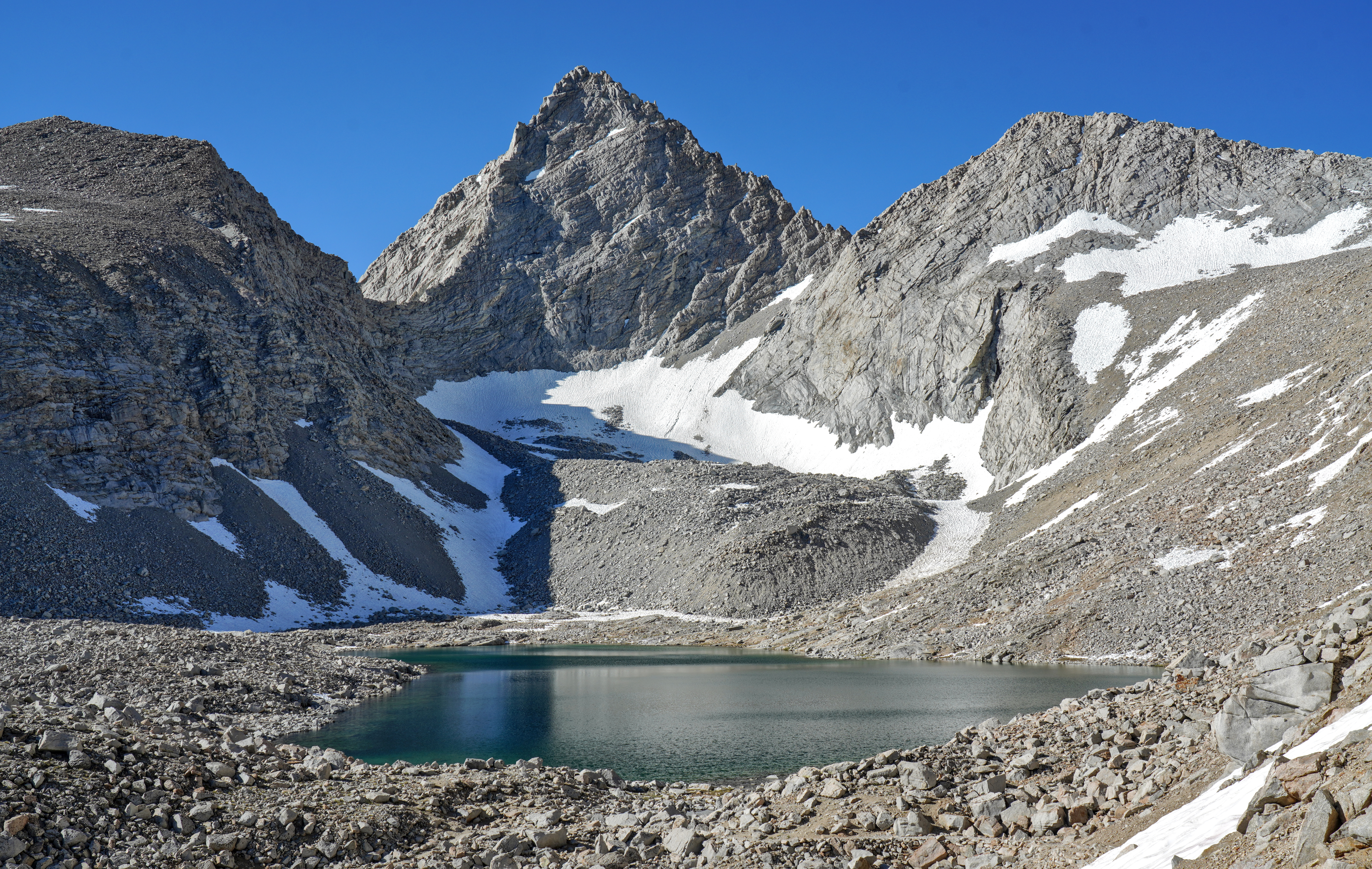
North aspect

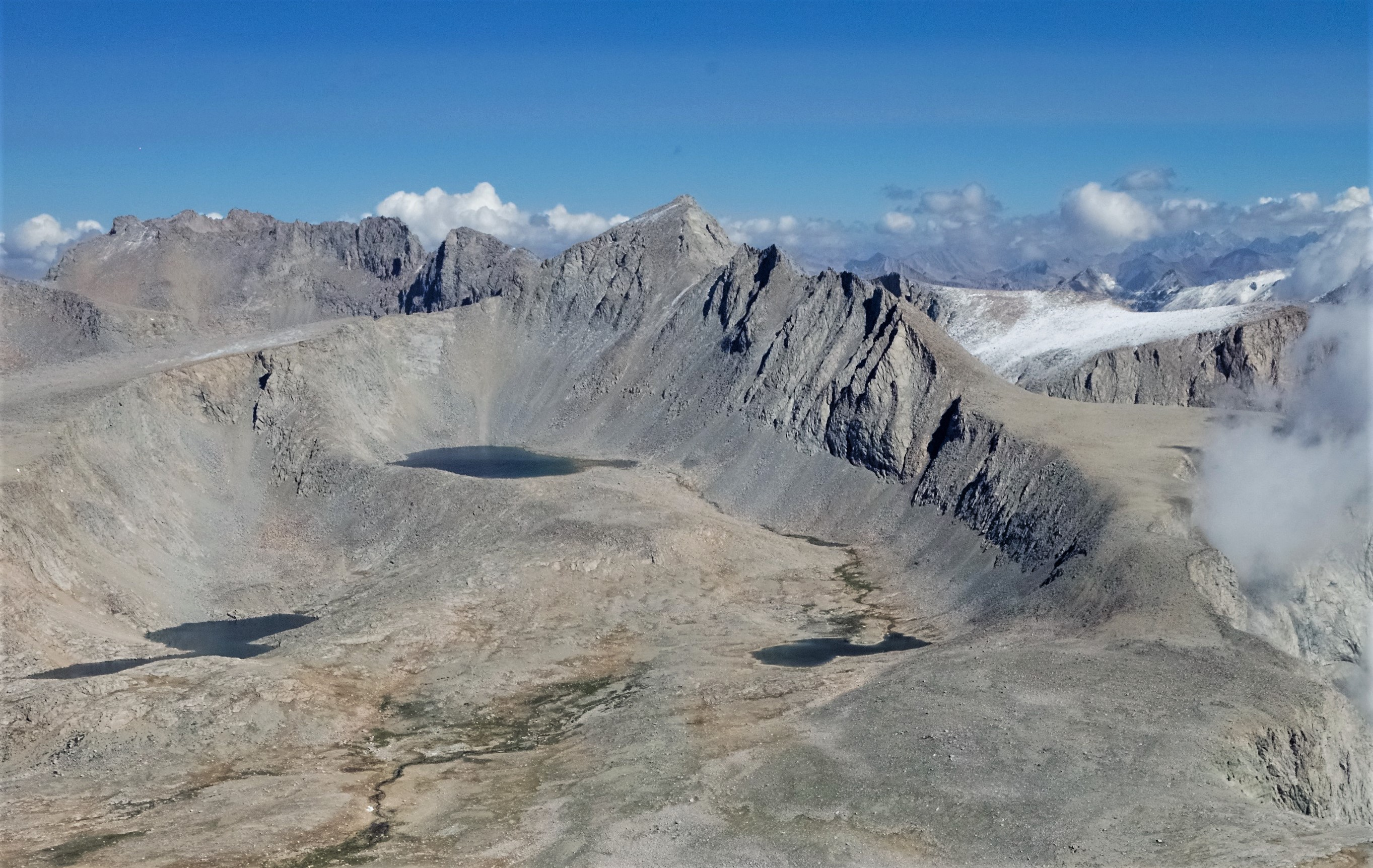
Southeast aspect, from Mt. Tyndall

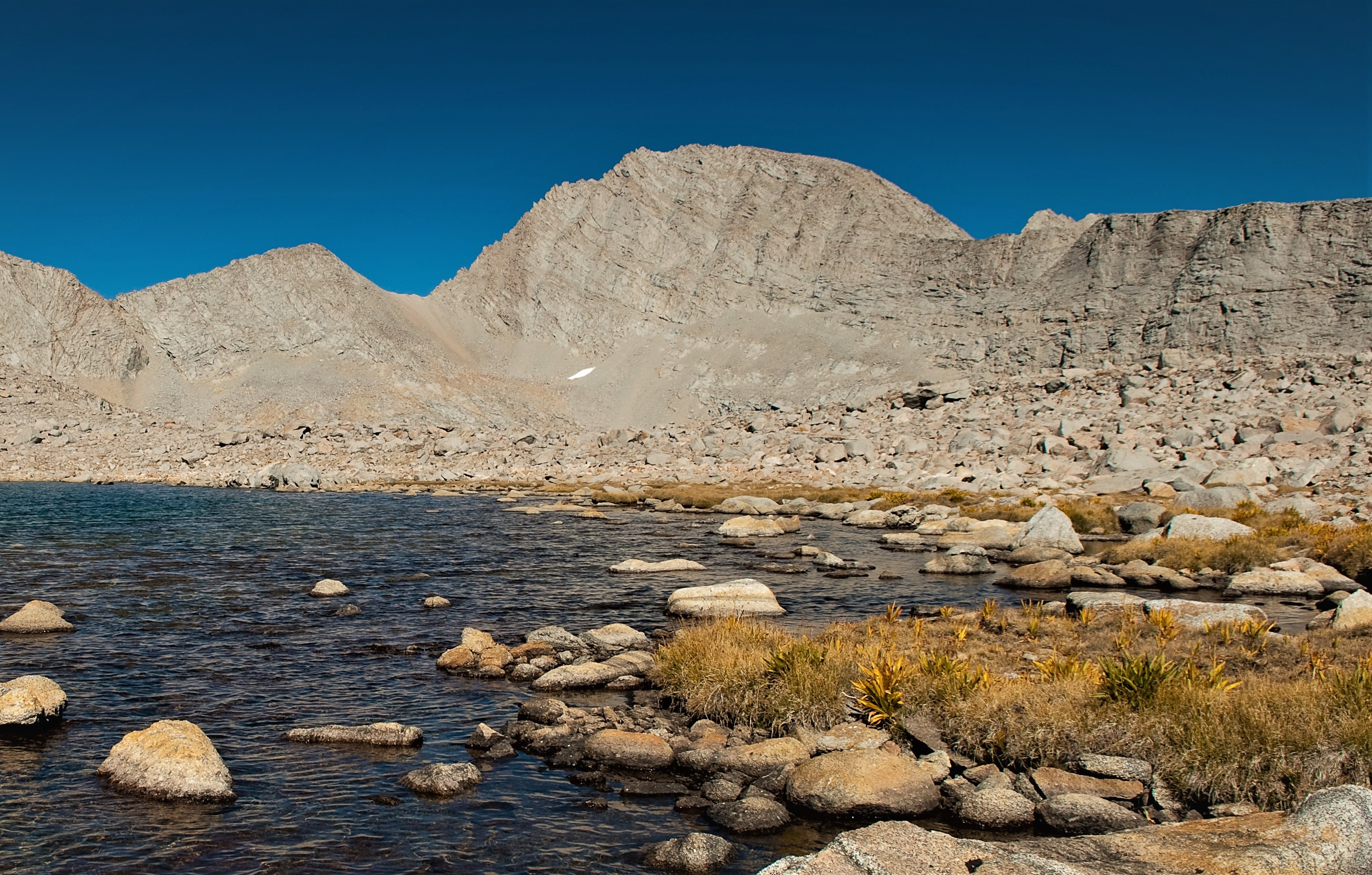
West face of Junction Peak

== See also ==
- Thirteener
