= OPM =

OPM may refer to:

== Organizations ==
- Office of Production Management, United States government agency that existed before the U.S. entry into World War II
- United States Office of Personnel Management, the manager of the federal civil service in the United States
  - Oklahoma Office of Personnel Management, the state equivalent of the federal agency
- Free Papua Movement (Organisasi Papua Merdeka), a separatist movement in Indonesia
- Political Military Organization (Organización Político Militar), Paraguayan clandestine movement

== Science and technology ==
- Object Process Methodology
- Older people's medicine, an alternative term for geriatrics
- Optical performance monitoring, used for managing high capacity optical transmission and switching systems
- Orientations of Proteins in Membranes database
- Opportunistic Mesh, a wireless networking technology
- Yamaha YM2151, an FM sound chip used in the late 1980s, also known as OPM (FM Operator Type-M)

== Entertainment ==
- Official U.S. PlayStation Magazine, a former US gaming magazine
- PlayStation Official Magazine – UK, a British gaming magazine

== Music ==
- OPM (band), an American band, who formed in 1999 from Los Angeles
- OPM (album), a 2008 album by Sarah Geronimo
- Original Pilipino Music, a genre of contemporary Philippine music

== Other uses ==
- Oak processionary, a moth
- Organizational Project Management
- Online program manager, an online platform for teaching, learning and educational course management
- O.P.M. Leasing Services, a defunct American computer leasing company
- Outsourced program management or Outsourced program manager, see Affiliate marketing
- Owner President Management Program, see Harvard Business School#Owner/President Management Program (OPM)

== See also ==
- Other people's money (disambiguation)
