= Z-SAN =

Z-SAN is a proprietary type of storage area network licensed by Zetera corporation. Z-SAN hardware is bundled with a modified version of SAN-FS, which is a shared-disk file system driver and management software product SAN File System (SFS) made by DataPlow. The shared-disk file system allows multiple computers to access the same volume at block level. Zetera calls their version of the file system Z-SAN.

The Z-SAN software license is purchased as part of the hardware package and is similar to ATA over Ethernet (AoE) sold by Coraid and LeftHand Networks. Zetera does not sell products directly, but instead licenses its technology to various other companies such as Netgear and Bell Microproducts. Like AoE, Z-SAN is intended to be a low-cost alternative to Fibre Channel and iSCSI. They do this by eliminating the need for the host adapter and TCP offload engine hardware, as well as use standard Ethernet switches instead of the more expensive Fibre Channel switches.

While AoE is mostly supported on Linux, Z-SAN is supported on Microsoft Windows platforms. A Z-SAN can array many more disks than a standard RAID. The Zetera website claims that MIT has a Z-SAN array totaling 1.4 Petabytes of storage. The disk arrays can be both striped and mirrored.

In 2005, the software was licensed to Netgear to be used in the Netgear SC101 product.
