= Netgear DG834 =

ADSL modem router series

Netgear DG834G v3

The DG834 series are popular ADSL modem router products from Netgear. The devices can be directly connected to a phone line and establish an ADSL broadband Internet connection to an internet service provider (ISP) and share it among several computers via 802.3 Ethernet and (on many models) 802.11b/g wireless data links.

These devices are popular among ISPs as they provide an all in one solution (ADSL modem/router/firewall/switch), which is ideal for home broadband users. The Netgear UK website claims the DG834G is the most popular wireless router in the UK and lists five awards that it has received.

The DG834G is perhaps the most popular product of the series, and has been produced in five versions. All versions have Wi-Fi.

The DG834 (without the G suffix) is the same product but without Wi-Fi. Wi-Fi can be added later by plugging in a wireless access point although this then occupies one of the RJ45 ports.

The DG834GT is a similar product - it looks like a DG834G v2 or v3, but has a Broadcom chipset like a DG834G v4 and supports Atheros Super G which can achieve a 108 Mbit/s signaling rate (double that of standard 802.11g). In the United Kingdom, many DG834GT routers were supplied by Sky Broadband and are branded with a Sky logo. Sky later supplied a DG934G router, which is a DG834G v3 router in a black case.

The DG834 GB is similar to DG834GT, have Broadcom chipset, but support only 54 Mbit/s wifi. It has modifications to support Annex-B ADSL.

The DG834PN model has Wi-Fi but no external antenna. It has six internal antennas, and is easily recognised by the blue dome on the top of its case.

The DG834GSP model is locked to a particular ISP.

== Firmware ==
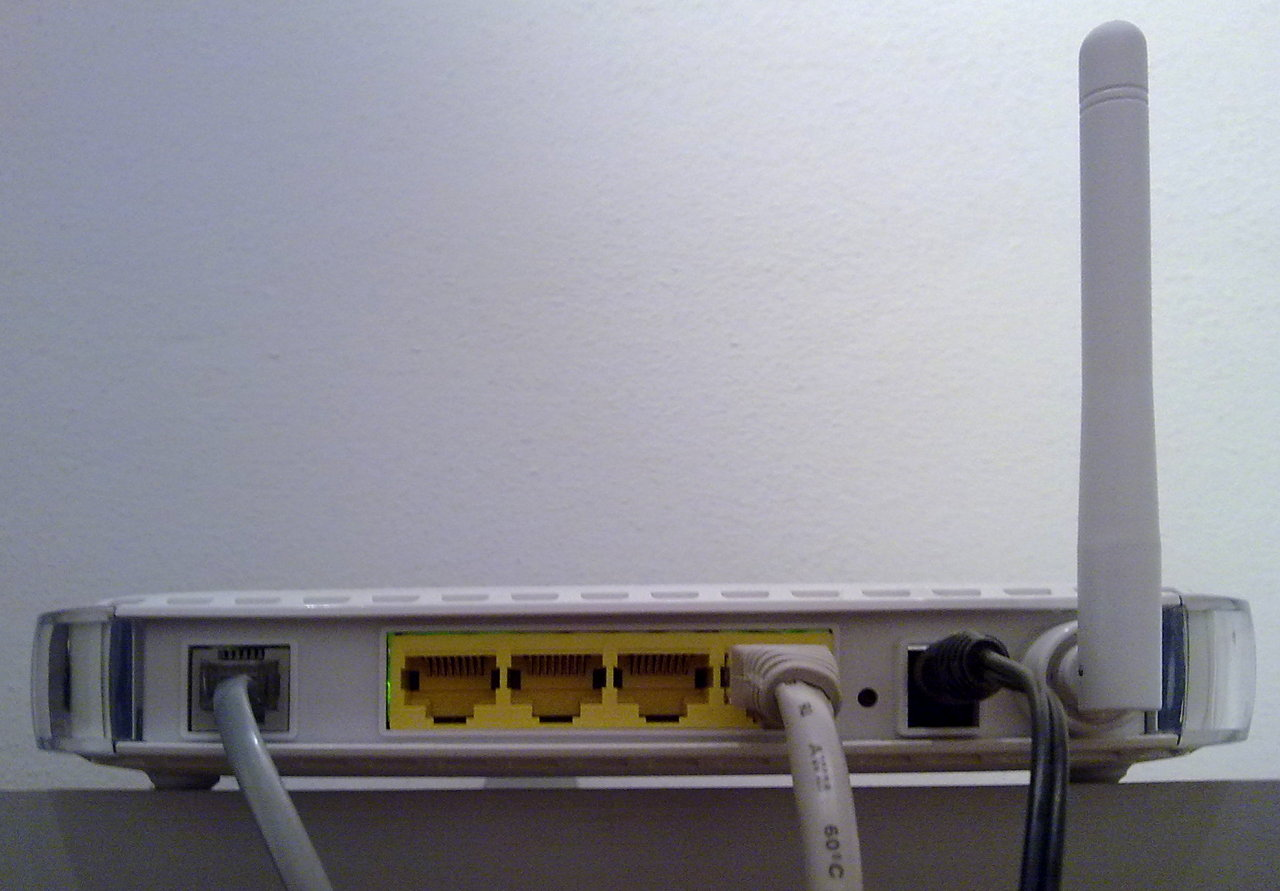
Netgear DG834G v4 rear plugs, in order: the RJ-11, the Ethernet switch (4 ports, from v3 is yellow coloured), the reset, the DC power plug, the 2.4GHz antenna.

Netgear's stock firmware on all products in the series runs Linux. This has led to popularity among computer enthusiasts as it provides a cheaper alternative to a Linux router. Much of the Netgear firmware is built from open-source software, and Netgear provide this source code and the build system to enable users to reassemble a new firmware image. As a result, various individuals and projects have produced modified firmware which extend the capabilities of the built-in firmware. It is also possible to completely replace the built-in firmware for TI-AR7 and Broadcom chipsets with firmware from other projects, such as OpenWRT. All products except the DG834(G) v5 run on a MIPS architecture CPU, the DG834(G) v5 runs on an ARM architecture CPU.

=== Security issue ===
Any person who can access the router using a web browser, can enable "debug" mode using [IP_ADDR]/setup.cgi?todo=debug and then connect via Telnet directly to the router's embedded Linux system as 'root', which gives unfettered access to the router's operating system via its Busybox functionality. Additionally, a 'hidden' URL [IP_ADDR]/setup.cgi?todo=ping_test also allows unfettered access (On a v5 model a username and password are requested). There is no user option provided to disable this. On default Netgear firmware Telnet access lacks password or other control; on ISP modified versions (such as Sky) a Telnet password exists based on the MAC address which can be found via online websites.

== Default settings ==
- IP address: 192.168.0.1 (alternate login URL http://www.routerlogin.net/)
- Username: admin (Virgin-branded units have a default user of virgin)
- Password: password (Sky-branded units have a default password of sky)
- Function set to Router + Modem

== Specifications ==
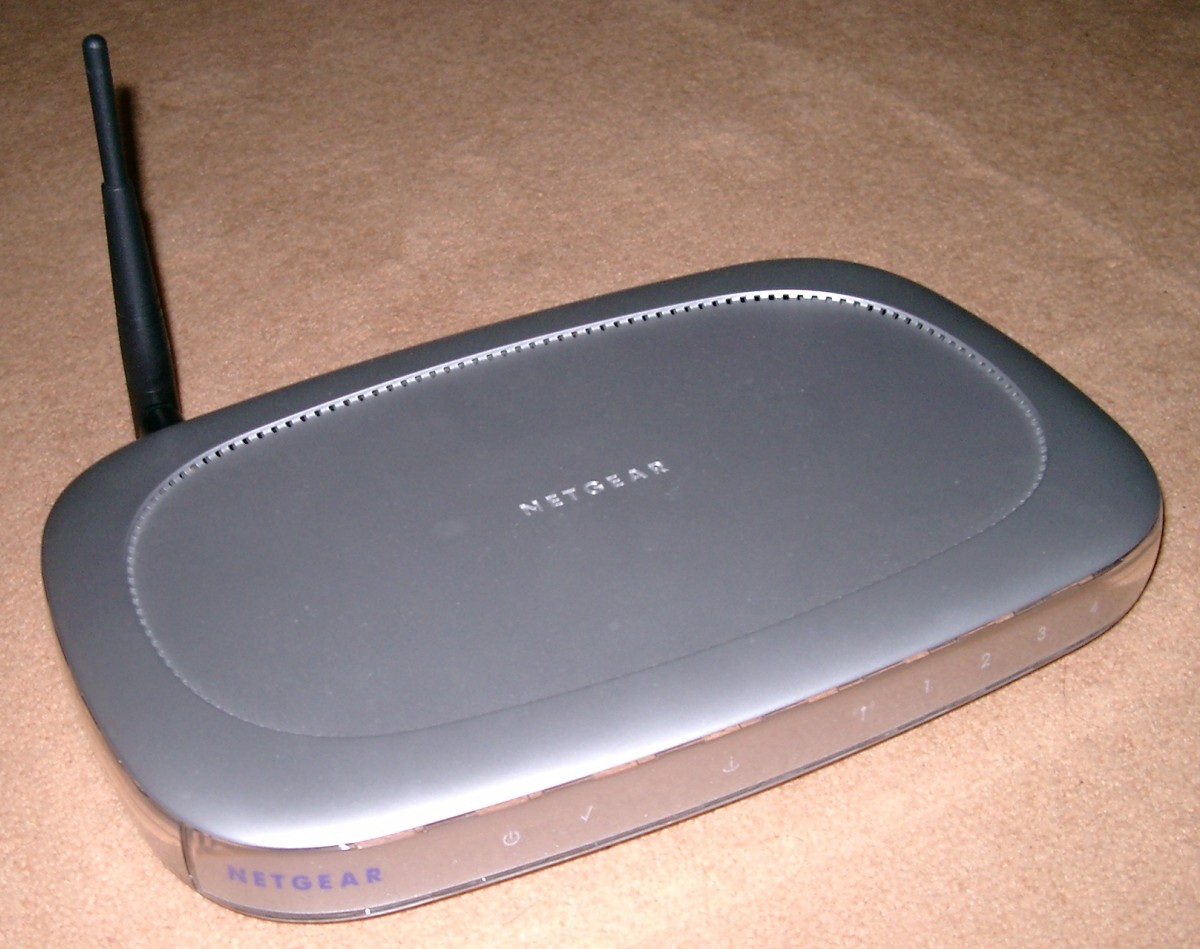
Netgear DG834G v1.

- 4-port 10/100 Mbit/s Ethernet switch
- Wireless Access Point (802.11b+g) (not on DG834 models)
- ADSL/ADSL2/ADSL2+ modem
- Firewall (as of DG834G v5 restricted to 20 rules)
- Router

== Differences between revisions/versions ==
=== DG834(G) ===
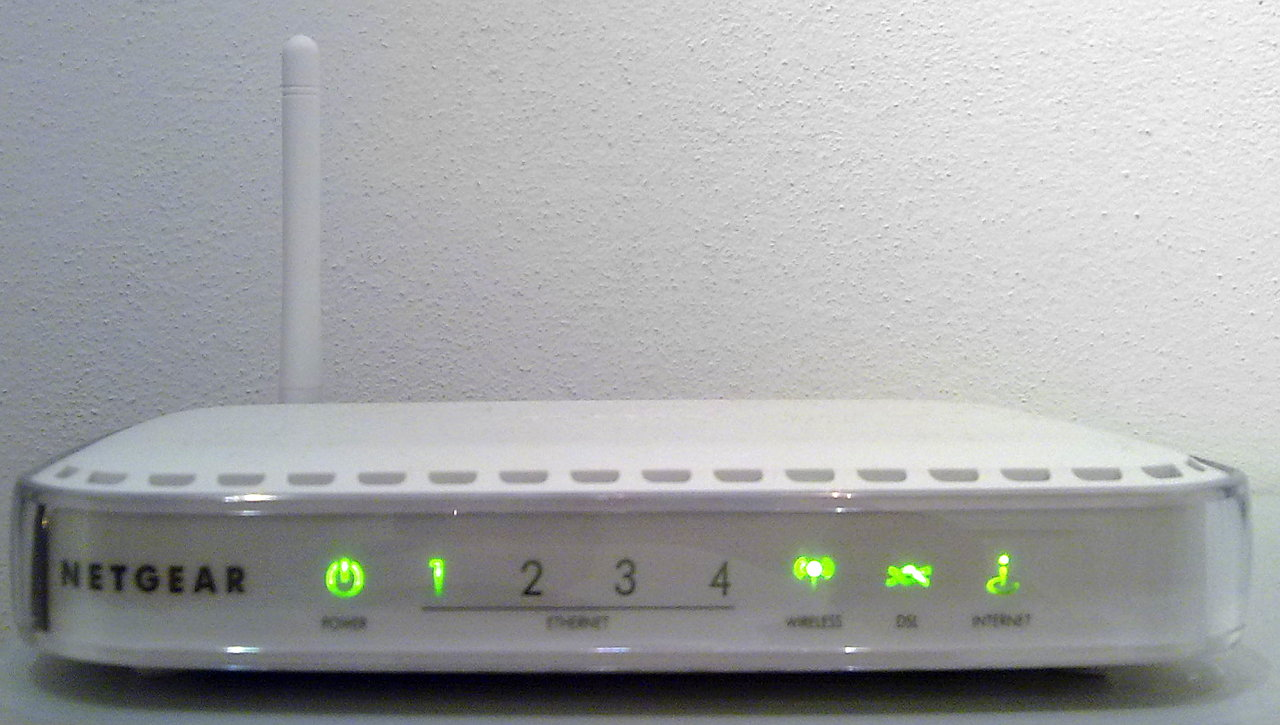
Netgear DG834G v4, in order: the power LED, the 4 Ethernet cable detection LEDs, the wireless power state and activity, the carrier wave LED (off/on) and the PPP LED (off, on, blinking when there's activity).

- DG834(G) v1: first release, known as v1 in retrospect. Grey case, larger than subsequent models. 15 V AC power supply. TI-AR7 chipset (MIPS32 CPU), 16 MB of SDRAM, 4 MB of flash memory. G versions have black removable antenna at the rear left, using an RP-SMA connector.
- DG834(G) v2: new smaller design in a white case. Different power supply requirements from v1, otherwise almost identical electrically (uses same firmware as v1). G versions have white removable antenna.
- DG834(G) v3:
  - RoHS-compliant construction.
  - Expands the Wireless encryption options to include:
    - WPA2-PSK(Wi-Fi Protected Access 2 with Pre-Shared Key)
    - WPA-PSK+WPA2-PSK
    - WPA2-802.1x
    - WPA-802.1x+WPA2-802.1x
  - Adds an "Advanced Wireless Settings" page to the enable, various wireless Bridge and Repeater modes.
  - Removes the Parental control and Trend Micro Security Services functionality.
  - Add a PPPoE relay mode.
  - Improves Sync speeds, on good / short lines.
  - White removable antenna.
- DG834(G) v4: Fixed antenna on G versions. Now uses Broadcom BCM6348 V0.7 chipset, also the Ethernet switch is now Broadcom BCM5325 (previously, it was Marvell) and the wifi module is branded Broadcom (previously it was Texas Instruments). Frontal connection LED split in 2: one for "carrier wave" connection, another for PPP link. The 4 Ethernet LEDs are now on the left of the front panel - all previous models had them to the right.
- DG834(G) v5 (aka DG834GNA for North America): G versions have the fixed antenna on the right (when viewed from front) - all previous models had antenna on the left. The antenna is attached to the board with a u-FL connector so an upgrade would be possible by somebody willing to void their warranty. Comes with additional buttons for power, Push 'n' Connect using Wi-Fi Protected Setup, and for switching the wireless radio on and off. Reset is achieved by holding in both side buttons simultaneously for about 6 seconds until power light flashes. The chipset used is a Conexant CX94610 which has an ARM CPU (all previous models used a MIPS CPU). Quality of service was also added as a fully changeable feature which was available with firmware version 6.00.25 but with the newer firmware version 1.6.01.34 the quality of service and wireless distribution system is not available.

=== DG834GT ===
Only one version produced. White case with a white removable antenna to the rear left of the unit which utilises an RP-SMA connector. Inclusion of a Broadcom BCM6348 chipset make this model notable, particularly as the Broadcom chipset offers superior compatibility over the Texas Instruments AR7 chipset (used in the DG834G v1-3) with ADSL2+ / LLU lines in the UK, partly due to power spectrum density (PSD) masks applied at the DSLAM.
