= KORTV =

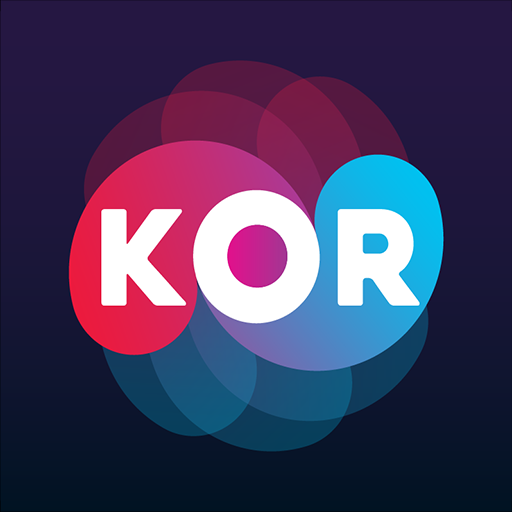
- Website type: Video streaming
- Available in: English, French
- Owners: KORTV, inc.
- Website: kortv.com
- Commercial: Yes
- Registration: Optional
- Launched: 2012; 14 years ago

KORTV, Inc. is a software-based streaming media company specializing in distributing South Korean movie, television, and premium channel content to audiences in more than 100 countries using both video on demand (VOD) and real-time streaming.

== History ==
KORTV was incorporated in Edison, New Jersey as WKNTV, Inc in 2012. WKNTV began streaming content via IPTV to Netgear NeoTV and Roku devices.

On August 2, 2013, the company filed for the trademark 'KORTV', which was registered on March 11, 2013. On December 11, KORTV became available on Apple TV, iPad, and iPhone devices.

== Programming ==
KORTV's Live IPTV channels are streamed in real-time, 24 hours a day, directly from the broadcaster and in high definition quality when available. KORTV's current Live IPTV line-up features 10 channels that are free and available for unlimited streaming—including Arirang, EBS, and JTBC. KORTV is the first company to ever offer free and legal real-time live-streaming of broadcast programming worldwide. KORTV's Live IPTV Premium line-up includes 7 premium channels available individually by monthly subscription. Additional television content, including archives of current and past shows, is available via video on demand (VOD), also by monthly subscription.

KORTV's available movie content includes many titles with English-language subtitles, offering potential to expand the company's market beyond Korean-speaking audiences. As with the VOD television content and the Live IPTV premium channel options, a monthly subscription is required to access KORTV's movie content.

== See also ==
- Kdrama
- Korean wave
