= OSNR =

OSNR, a four-letter acronym or abbreviation, may refer to:

- Optical signal-to-noise ratio
- Optical spectrum analyzer
- Optical performance monitoring
- Other / Signature Not Required - a delivery classification used by some shippers.
