= Wonjong Rhee =

South Korean electrical engineer

Wonjong Rhee is an electrical engineer at ASSIA, Inc. in San Francisco, California. He was named a Fellow of the Institute of Electrical and Electronics Engineers (IEEE) in 2012 for his work on dynamic spectrum management systems.
