= NSDP =

NSDP may refer to:

- Irish Nazi Party (NSDP-AO), see Adolf Mahr
- National Secular Democratic Party, a political party in Lebanon
- National Solidarity and Development Party, a political organization in Burma
- National Space Development Program (Philippines)
- Net state domestic product, used in relation to calculate the GDP per capita in India
- Netgear Switch Discovery Protocol, a vendor-specific management protocol
- Nevada State Democratic Party, an affiliate of the Nevada Democratic Party
- New Social Democratic Party, in the Republic of North Macedonia
- Nationwide Social Democratic Party, in the Republic of Kazakhstan

== See also ==
- NSDAP, or Nazi Party
