= FirstNet Authority =

American public safety broadband network operator

First Responder Network Authority
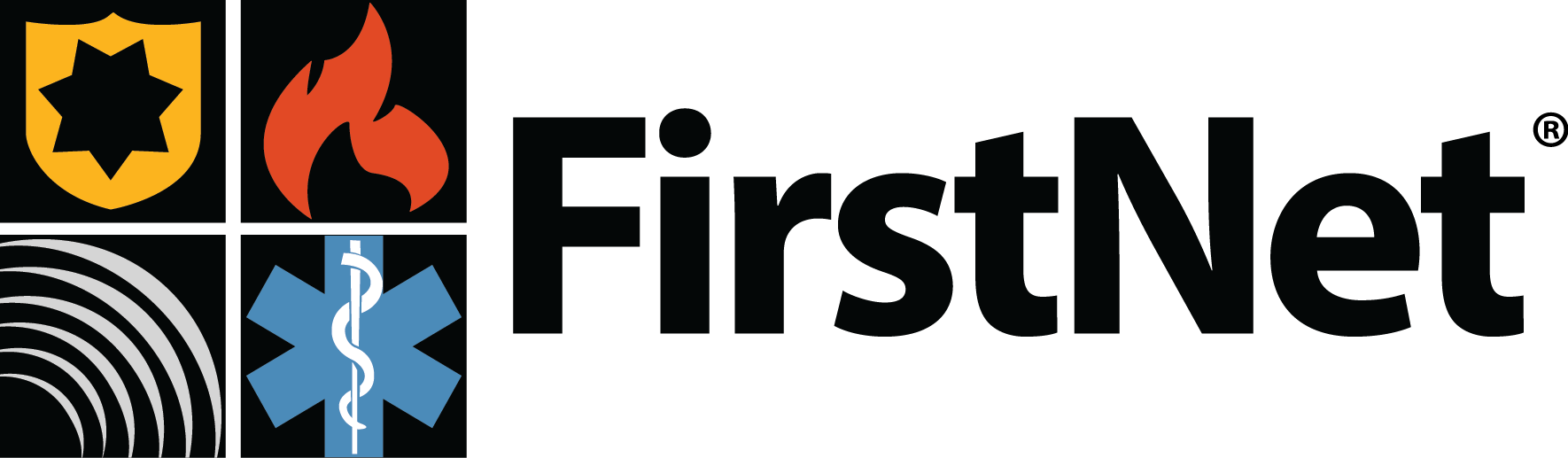

Agency overview
- Formed: 2012
- Headquarters: 12201 Sunrise Valley Drive Reston, Virginia 20192; 38.9466°N 77.3672°W
- Annual budget: $867 million (FY2026)
- Agency executive: Mike Cannon, CEO / Executive Director
- Parent department: Department of Commerce
- Parent agency: National Telecommunications and Information Administration
- Website: firstnet.gov

The First Responder Network Authority, commonly known as the FirstNet Authority (or simply FirstNet), is an independent U.S. government authority established under the Middle Class Tax Relief and Job Creation Act of 2012 (MCTRJCA). Its mandate is to ensure the building, deployment, and operation of a nationwide interoperable broadband network for public safety (the Nationwide Public Safety Broadband Network, or NPSBN). Congress allotted $7 billion and 20 MHz of radio spectrum (Band 14) to the effort.

== History ==
Calls for a nationwide broadband system came after September 11, 2001. The 9/11 attacks "highlighted the inability for deployed public safety networks to handle a true crisis situation."

Prior to FirstNet, the Public Safety Spectrum Trust was selected by the Federal Communications Commission (FCC) as the Public Safety Broadband Licensee (PSBL) for the 10 MHz of 700 MHz public safety nationwide broadband spectrum.

The Middle Class Tax Relief and Job Creation Act of 2012 directed the creation of FirstNet as an independent authority to oversee the development of the NPSBN, and Band 14 of the 700 MHz spectrum, consisting of 20 MHz, was set aside for FirstNet.

During its formative years, the Authority held consultations with public safety, state and local governments, and tribal nations.

In March 2017, FirstNet Authority awarded the contract to AT&T to build and operate the network under agreed-upon performance and coverage obligations. States had the option to opt in to the FirstNet plan or to build their own RANs (with interoperability obligations). All 56 states and territories opted in.

In December 2023, the Authority validated that AT&T had completed the initial five-year build-out by the March 30, 2023, target. After the build-out was completed, the Authority shifted focus to evolving the network to support 5G, expand coverage, and improve mission-critical services.

== Governance ==
FirstNet is an independent authority within the National Telecommunications and Information Administration (NTIA) within the U.S. Department of Commerce.

A 15-member Board of Directors governs the First Responder Network Authority. Three are ex officio board members – the United States Secretary of Homeland Security, the United States Attorney General, and the Director of the Office of Management and Budget. The remaining 12 members are selected by the United States Secretary of Commerce for their public safety, technical, network, and/or financial expertise. The board approves budgets, oversees strategic direction, and ensures accountability; an Executive Director / CEO (and senior management team) handles day-to-day operations.

Current members of the FirstNet Authority Board are:

- Todd Blanche – United States Attorney General
- Markwayne Mullin – United States Secretary of Homeland Security
- Russell Vought – Director Office of Management and Budget
- Sheriff Michael A. Adkinson (Acting Board Chair) – Sheriff of Walton County, Florida
- Jocelyn Moore (Acting Governance Committee Chair) – industry executive, former EVP of Communications and Public Affairs of the National Football League, and member of the Boards of Directors of DraftKings and Oppfi
- Sean P. McDevitt (Finance & Investment Committee Chair) – telecom industry executive and Partner at Arthur D. Little in Boston, Massachusetts
- Rasheid Scarlett (Programs and Future Planning Committee Chair) – Information technology executive and CEO of NetAesthetics
- Chief Trisha L. Wolford (Advocacy Committee Chair)- Fire Chief, Anne Arundel County Fire Department, Maryland
- Alexandra Fernández Navarro – Puerto Rico Public Service Regulatory Board
- Dr. Damon Darsey, MD – Medical Director, Mississippi Department of Public Safety
- Erik S. Gaul – Emergency Manager, First Responder, Technology Consultant based in Washington DC
- Chief Jeffrey B. Norman – Police Chief, City of Milwaukee, Wisconsin
- Warren Mickens – Retired Vice President, CenturyLink Communications; and former Vice President, Nokia/Alcatel-Lucent based in Denver, Colorado
- Open Position
- Open Position

Prior board members have included:

- Richard Carrizzo, Past Board Chair – Chief of the Southern Platte Fire Protection District, Kansas City, MO. Served 2019–2024.
- Renee Gordon – City of Alexandria, Virginia Department of Emergency & Customer Communications Director. Served 2021–2024.
- Keisha Lance Bottoms, Past Board Chair (resigned) – ex Mayor of Atlanta. Served 2024–2025.
- Sue Swenson, Past Board Chair – retired communications industry executive
- Robert Tipton Osterthaler
- Matt Slinkard
- David Zolet
- Neil E. Cox
- Brian Crawford – VP and Chief Administrative Officer of Willis-Knighton Health System. Served 2019–2024.
- Stephen Benjamin Past Board Chair – Mayor, Columbia, SC
- Billy Hewes – Mayor Gulfport MS. Served 2019–2024.
- Edward Horowitz
- Charles F. Dowd – retired Assistant Police Chief NYPD
- Jeff Johnson ex Board Vice Chair – Western Fire Chief Emeritus
- Paul Patrick – Division Director, Family Health and Preparedness, Utah Department of Health. Served 2019–2024.
- Kristin Graziano – Sheriff, Charleston County, SC. Served 2021–2024.
- Peter Koutoujian, Sheriff, Middlesex County, MA. Served 2021–2024.
- Sylvia Moir, AZ. Retired Police Chief of Tempe, AZ. Served 2021–2024.
- Brigadier General Welton Chase
- Karima Holmes, 9-1-1 industry leader based in Washington DC, Served 2019–2022.

In May 2025, Michael Cannon was named as the new CEO of the FirstNet Authority.

== Radio Access Network (RAN) ==
The construction of the nationwide FirstNet network requires each state to have a Radio Access Network (RAN) that will connect to FirstNet's network core. According to the MCTRJCA, FirstNet is responsible for consulting with states, local communities, and tribal governments to develop the requirements for its RAN deployment plan. These efforts began in May 2013. However, each state will have the option to either allow FirstNet to create the RAN or to opt out and create its own RAN.

Even if a state chooses to opt out and receives approval from the Federal Communications Commission (FCC) to develop its own RAN, the RAN must use the FirstNet network core and must meet FirstNet requirements. For a state to receive FCC approval, it must demonstrate the following abilities:

- Provide the technical capability to operate and fund the RAN
- Maintain ongoing interoperability with the FirstNet Network
- Complete the project within specified comparable timelines
- Execute the plan cost-effectively
- Deliver security, coverage, and quality of service comparable to the FirstNet network

States that meet these criteria and receive FCC approval may apply for grant funding through the NTIA.

== Broadband wireless network ==
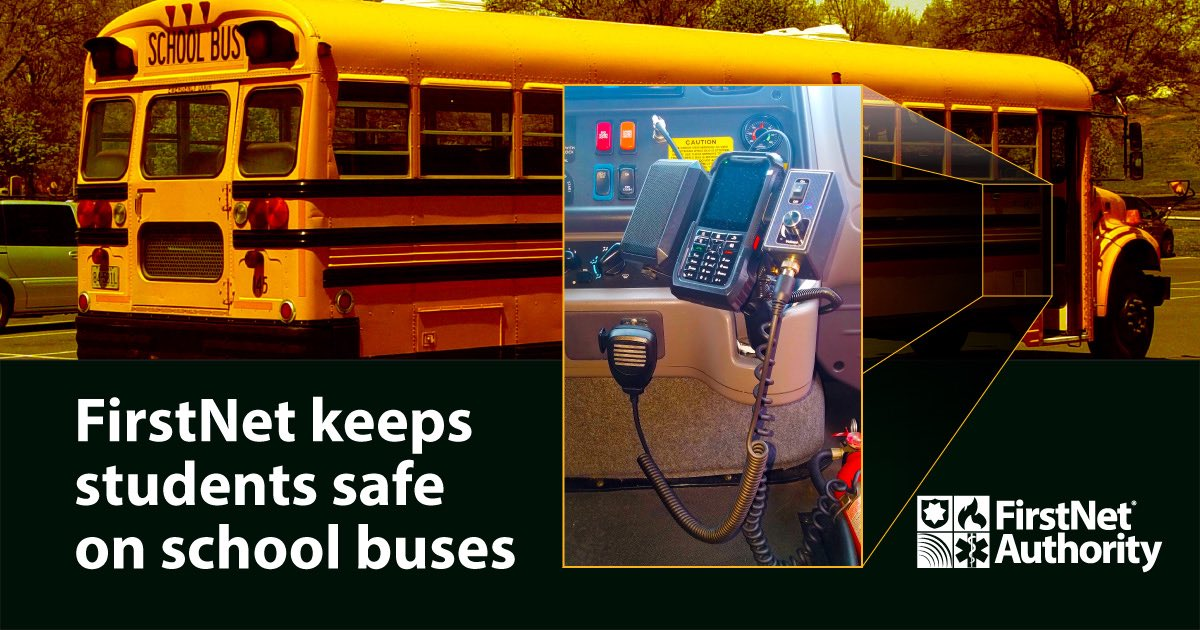
A promotional image from the National Telecommunications and Information Administration about FirstNet being used on school buses.

Calls for the nationwide broadband system came after September 11, 2001. The federal government has been working toward a system ever since that time. The 9/11 attacks "highlighted the inability for deployed public safety networks to handle a true crisis situation."

FirstNet is in the early stages of creating the first nationwide high-speed broadband wireless network "providing a single interoperable platform for law enforcement, firefighters, paramedics and other public safety officials in every state, county, locality and tribal area." In an April 2016 article, a spokesman for FirstNet said “FirstNet is going to really revolutionize the communications technology for first responders. Our next-generation technology isn't just going to save lives, but it's going to keep our first responders safer and make our communities safer, because it's going to provide extra situational awareness for people out in the field.”

Currently, there are around 10,000 different and incompatible “land mobile radio networks" that first responders in the U.S. use in their jobs. This patchwork of different systems can get in the way of first responders' being able to effectively communicate with each other during emergencies.

States are able to opt out of FirstNet's new nationwide broadband network. FirstNet assists those states by providing a guide that helps the states deploy communications networks that have interoperability with other systems.

The Federal Communications Commission and the National Telecommunications and Information Administration are also involved in coordinating the broadband system.

At a U.S. Senate hearing in July 2016, Senators Brian Schatz (D-Hawaii) and Roger Wicker (R-Mississippi) expressed concern to FirstNet's CEO, who was testifying at the hearing, about various issues related to the national broadband system. Schatz said that he would rather see FirstNet partner with states instead of "establishing a 'grantee-grantor relationship'". Wicker said he was concerned that the $7 billion budget for the program was not enough funding.

== Public forums ==
In August 2016 FirstNet held a border security forum in Phoenix, Arizona. FirstNet officials met with federal and local security officials to discuss problems with communications networks and updates on FirstNet's deployment of the national broadband wireless network. FirstNet's representatives said that LTE technology (the data and apps that people have on their smart phones) will help emergency responders during public emergencies.

== Implementation ==
FirstNet is headquartered in Reston, Virginia, with technical headquarters in Boulder, Colorado. The authority board created a public-private partnership with AT&T in March 2017 to build out FirstNet.

In December 2017, all 50 states opted in to the network plan with AT&T, but questions remained about when it would be deployed and how cost-effective it is.

In December 2023, FirstNet Authority Board Chairman Richard Corrizzo announced that the FirstNet Authority had validated that AT&T had completed the initial five-year network buildout by the March 30, 2023 deadline.

=== Mobile network ===
As a result of the abovementioned partnership, all FirstNet subscribers use the AT&T Mobility cellular network, with maximum priority given to 4G LTE Band 14 (700 MHz) originally reserved for FirstNet as well as other frequency bands over other AT&T subscribers.

== Criticism ==
FirstNet was characterized in 2016 as "the most wasteful post-9/11 initiative" by the journalist Steven Brill, who wrote "FirstNet is in such disarray that 15 years after the problem it is supposed to solve was identified, it is years from completion—and it may never get completed at all."
