= Cognitive network =

Communication data network

In communication networks, cognitive network (CN) is a new type of data network that makes use of cutting edge technology from several research areas (i.e. machine learning, knowledge representation, computer network, network management) to solve some problems current networks are faced with. Cognitive network is different from cognitive radio (CR) as it covers all the layers of the OSI model (not only layers 1 and 2 as with CR).

== History ==
The first definition of the cognitive network was provided by Theo Kanter in his doctoral research at KTH, The Royal Institute of Technology, Stockholm, including a presentation in June 1998 of the cognitive network as the network with memory. Theo was a student of Chip Maguire who also was advising Joe Mitola, the originator of cognitive radio. Mitola focused on cognition in the nodes, while Kanter focused on cognition in the network. Mitola's Licentiate thesis, published in August, 1999 includes the following quote "Over time, the [Radio Knowledge Representation Language] RKRL-empowered network can learn to distinguish a feature of the natural environment that does not match the models. It could declare the errors to a cognitive network." This is the earliest publication of the concept cognitive network, since Kanter published a bit later.

IBM's autonomic networks challenge of 2001 instigated the introduction of a cognition cycle into networks. Cognitive radio, Kanter's cognitive networks, and IBM's autonomic networks provided the foundation for the parallel evolution of cognitive wireless networks and other cognitive networks. In 2004, Petri Mahonen, currently at RWTH, Aachen, and a member of Mitola's doctoral committee organized the first international workshop on cognitive wireless networks at Dagstuhl, Germany. In addition, the EU's E2R and E3 programs developed cognitive network theory under the rubric of self* - self organizing networks, self-aware networks, and so forth. One of the attempts to define the concept of cognitive network was made in 2005 by Thomas et al. and is based on an older idea of the Knowledge Plane described by Clark et al. in 2003 . B.S. Manoj et al. proposed a Cognitive Complete Knowledge Network System in 2008. Since then, several research activities in the area have emerged. A survey and an edited book reveal some of these efforts.

The Knowledge Plane is "a pervasive system within the network that builds and maintains high level models of what the network is supposed to do, in order to provide services and advice to other elements of the network" .

The concept of large scale cognitive network was further made in 2008 by Song, where such Knowledge Plan is clearly defined for large scale wireless networks as the knowledge about the availability of radio spectrum and wireless stations.

== Definition ==
Thomas et al. define the CN as a network with a cognitive process that can perceive current network conditions, plan, decide, act on those conditions, learn from the consequences of its actions, all while following end-to-end goals. This loop, the cognition loop, senses the environment, plans actions according to input from sensors and network policies, decides which scenario fits best its end-to-end purpose using a reasoning engine, and finally acts on the chosen scenario as discussed in the previous section. The system learns from the past (situations, plans, decisions, actions) and uses this knowledge to improve the decisions in the future.

This definition of CN does not explicitly mention the knowledge of the network; it only describes the cognitive loop and adds end-to-end goals that would distinguish it from CR or so called cognitive layers. This definition of CN seems to be incomplete since it lacks knowledge which is an important component of a cognitive system as discussed in, and.

Balamuralidhar and Prasad give an interesting view of the role of ontological knowledge representation: “The persistent nature of this ontology enables proactiveness and robustness to ‘ignorable events’ while the unitary nature enables end-to-end adaptations.”

In, CN is seen as a communication network augmented by a knowledge plane that can span vertically over layers (making use of cross-layer design) and/or horizontally across technologies and nodes (covering a heterogeneous environment). The knowledge plane needs at least two elements: (1) a representation of relevant knowledge about the scope (device, homogeneous network, heterogeneous network, etc.); (2) a cognition loop which uses artificial intelligence techniques inside its states (learning techniques, decision making techniques, etc.).

Furthermore, in and, a detailed cross-layer network architecture was proposed for CNs, where CN is interpreted as a network that can utilize both radio spectrum and wireless station resources opportunistically, based upon the knowledge of such resource availability. Since CR has been developed as a radio transceiver that can utilize spectrum channels opportunistically (dynamic spectrum access), the CN is therefore a network that can opportunistically organize CRs.

== Network architecture ==
The cross-layer network architecture of CN in is also named as Embedded Wireless Interconnection (EWI) as opposed to Open System Interconnection (OSI) protocol stack. The CN architecture is based on a new definition of wireless linkage. The new abstract wireless links are redefined as arbitrary mutual co-operations among a set of neighboring (proximity) wireless nodes. In comparison, traditional wireless networking relies on point-to-point "virtual wired-links" with a predetermined pair of wireless nodes and allotted spectrum.

This network architecture also has the following three primary principles:

- Functional Linkage Abstraction: Based on the definition of abstract wireless linkage, wireless link modules are implemented in individual wireless nodes, which can set up different types of abstract wireless links. According to the functional abstractions, categories of wireless link modules can include: broadcast, unicast, multicast, and data aggregation, etc. Therefore, network functionality can be integrated in the design of wireless link modules. This also results in two hierarchical layers as the architectural basics, including the system layer and the wireless link layer, respectively. The bottom wireless link layer supplies a library of wireless link modules to the upper system layer; the system layer organizes the wireless link modules to achieve effective application programming.
- Opportunistic Wireless Links: In realizing the cognitive wireless networking concept, both the occupied spectrum and the participating nodes of an abstract wireless link are opportunistically determined by their instantaneous availabilities. This principle decides the design of wireless link modules in the wireless link layer. The system performance can improve with larger network scale, since higher network density introduces extra diversity in the opportunistic formation of any abstract wireless links.
- Global QoS Decoupling: Global application or network QoS (Quality of Service) is decoupled into local requirements of co-operations in neighboring wireless nodes, i.e., wireless link QoS. More specifically, by decoupling global application-level QoS, it allows the system layer to better organize the wireless link modules that are provided by the wireless link layer. For example, by decoupling global network-level QoS, such as throughput, end-to-end delay, and delay jitter, the wireless link module design can achieve the global QoS requirements. Based on the provided wireless link modules, the complexity at individual nodes can be independent of the network scale.

Wireless link modules provide system designers with reusable open network abstractions, where the modules can be individually updated, or new modules may be added into the wireless link layer. High modularity and flexibility could be essential for middleware or application developments.

EWI is also an organizing-style architecture, where the system layer organizes the wireless link modules (at the wireless link layer); and peer wireless link modules can exchange module management information by padding packet headers to the system-layer information units.

Five types of wireless link modules were proposed, including broadcast, peer-to-peer unicast, multicast, to-sink unicast, and data aggregation, respectively. Other arbitrary types of modules may be added, establishing other types of abstract wireless links without limitation. For example, the broadcast module simply disseminates data packets to surrounding nodes. The peer-to-peer unicast module can deliver data packets from source to destination over multiple wireless hops. The multicast module sends data packets to multiple destinations, as compared to peer-to-peer unicast. The to-sink unicast module can be especially useful in wireless sensor networks, which utilizes higher capabilities of data collectors (or sinks), so as to achieve better data delivery. The data-aggregation module opportunistically collects and aggregates the context related data from a set of proximity wireless nodes.

Two service access points (SAP) are defined on the interface between the system layer and the wireless link layer, which are WL_SAP (Wireless Link SAP) and WLME_SAP (Wireless Link Management Entity SAP), respectively. WL_SAP is used for the data plane, whereas WLME_SAP is used for the management plane. The SAPs are utilized by the system layer in controlling the QoS of wireless link modules.

== See also ==
- Cross-layer optimization
- End-to-end principle
- Opportunistic Mesh

== Sources ==
- Kanter, Theo (2001), "Adaptive Personal Mobile Communication, Service Architecture and Protocols.", Trita-It. Avh. (Ph.D. Dissertation), Kista, Sweden: KTH Royal Institute of Technology, ISSN 1403-5286
- Clark, David D.; Partridge, Craig; Ramming, J. Christopher; Wroclawski, John T. (2003), "A knowledge plane for the internet", Proceedings of the 2003 Conference on Applications, Technologies, Architectures, and Protocols for Computer Communications - SIGCOMM '03, p. 3, doi:10.1145/863955.863957, ISBN 1581137354, S2CID 207627798
- Mitola, Joseph (2000), "Cognitive Radio – An Integrated Agent Architecture for Software Defined Radio", Trita-It. Avh. (Ph.D. Dissertation), Kista, Sweden: KTH Royal Institute of Technology, ISSN 1403-5286
- Thomas, R.W.; Dasilva, L.A.; MacKenzie, A.B. (2005), "Cognitive networks", First IEEE International Symposium on New Frontiers in Dynamic Spectrum Access Networks, 2005. DySPAN 2005, pp. 352–360, doi:10.1109/DYSPAN.2005.1542652, ISBN 1-4244-0013-9
- Manoj, B.; Rao, Ramesh; Zorzi, Michele (2008), "CogNet: A cognitive complete knowledge network system", IEEE Wireless Communications, 15 (6): 81–88, Bibcode:2008IWC....15f..81M, doi:10.1109/MWC.2008.4749751, S2CID 1511248
