= Painful Easter =

The Painful Easter is the name given by the Paraguayan press to the repression of several farmers groups accused of participating in the clandestine movement Organización Primero de Marzo (OPM) by the police of the Alfredo Stroessner regime. The persecution reached many regions of the country and destroyed any attempt of building any kind of organization between agriculture workers.

== Agrarian organizations ==
In 1976, Alfredo Stroessner had been ruling the country for over 22 years. Even though he was periodically elected representing the Colorado Party and maintained the façade of a democracy, Stroessner was an authoritarian dictator that heavily repressed the political opposition and Social Movements. The 1970s was characterized for the national economic increase thanks to the construction of the Itaipú dam over the Paraná River, in the border with Brazil. Nevertheless, it was a time of politic asphyxiation and the fact that in other countries of the region existed many social movements arising led many young Paraguayans to take some radical decisions to offer some resistance to the government.

Since 1973, a clandestine organization, later known as the OPM, was operating in the country throughout students groups that moved in the urban area of Asunción. Most of the leaders of the organization were Paraguayans student that had gone to Argentina to study, where they had met some guerrilla organization members such as the Montoneros.

Because the working class in Paraguay was practically non-existent and even more, disorganized, the foundations of a revolutionary movement that wanted to have a popular approval, had to be around the agrarians movements and more specifically the agrarian sector. The agrarian organizations were going through one of its crucial moments. For over a decade then, in several regions of the country, one of the most important attempts of agrarian organization with a Catholic ideology in Latin-America was developing: the Agrarian Christian Leagues.

With a strong Christian expression in its beginnings, the leagues grew as an answer to the old problem of the land and its exploitation. The activities that the leagues were linked to centered in the communitarian work like "mingas" and in the instruction and formation of the agrarian workers. They also had "communitarian schools" that used the popular education method of Paulo Freire.

The intimidation acts of the government grew as the Leagues expanded. One of the historical leaders of the organization was Constantino Coronel. Since 1972 a sector of his followers begun to argue the need of starting a political fight against the dictatorship and even though the idea of a strong opposition was still vague, they started to organize discreetly. The Catholic Church, that first supported the Agrarian Christian Leagues begun to drift apart from the organization sensing that the control had gone over hand.

== The First of March organization ==
The meeting of the Agrarian Christian Leagues with an armed movement was inevitable and begun in 1973. With the leadership of Juan Carlos Da Costa, the OPM managed to establish a poor clandestine structure. In November 1974, a few activist of the Argentine armed group Montoneros came to Asunción to military and political train a few of the OPM members. In 1975, the leader Constantino Coronel had integrated the National Conduction.

== The repression ==
In April 1976, the police discovered by chance the existence of the organization and managed to capture its main leaders, killing several of its bosses, between them, Juan Carlos Da Costa. In the next days the repression limited itself to the capital, but during the Easter, the police found evidence that linked the OPM to the Agrarian Christian Leagues leaders. The so-called “Painful Easter” begun in San Juan Bautista de las Misiones, where the commissioner Camilo Almada Morel, alias Sapriza, was sent to, with the powers of detain any suspect. Hundreds of farmers that lived in the surroundings were imprisoned in the jail Abraham Cué. Eight farmers were executed and many more were brought to Asunción in vans.

During that time, the prisoners in the capital were so many that they barely fitted the Investigations Department and Asuncion's police stations. In September 1976, most of the prisoners were moved to the prison of Emboscada, 20 km from Asunción.
