= Netgear WNR3500L =

WiFi router

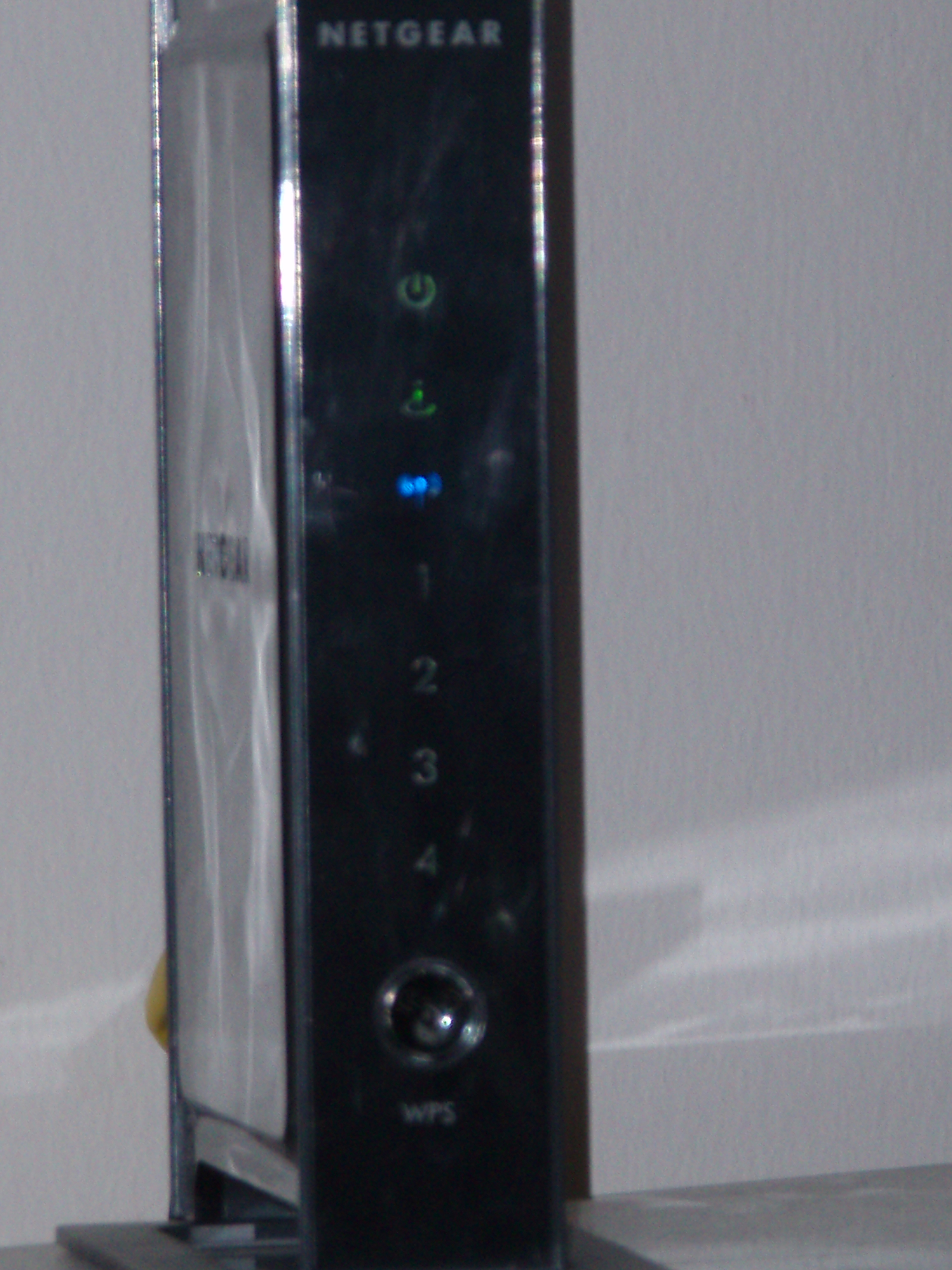
Netgear WNR3500L router

The WNR3500L (also known as the WNR3500U) is an 802.11b/g/n Wi-Fi router created by Netgear. It was officially launched in the autumn of 2009. The WNR3500L runs open-source Linux firmware and supports the installation of third party packages such as DD-WRT and Tomato.

== Hardware ==
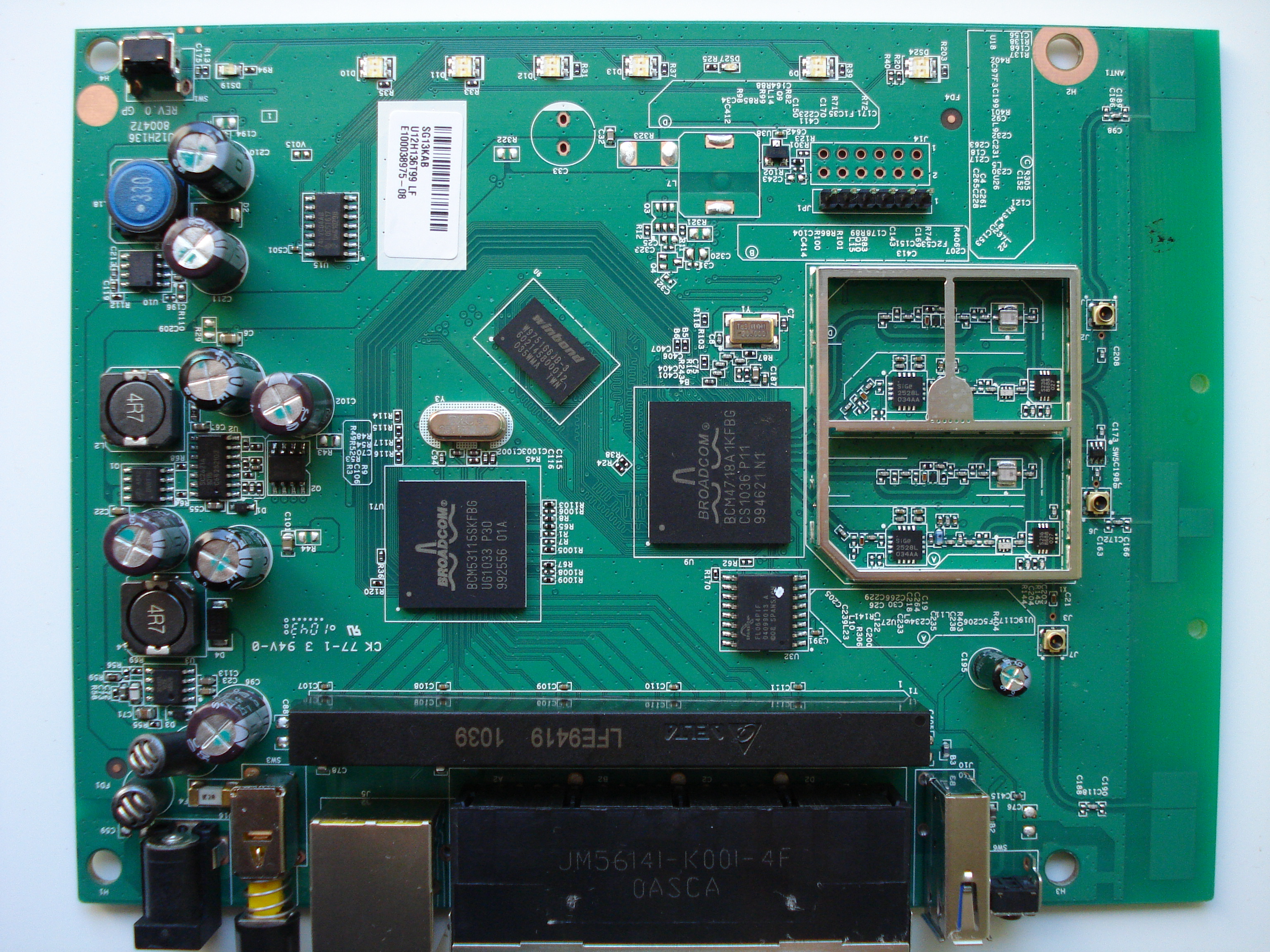
Printed circuit board (PCB)

Version 1:

- Broadcom BCM4718 453 MHz SoC
- 8 MB Flash memory
- 64 MB RAM
- 32 kB instruction cache
- 32 kB data cache
- Three internal antennas
- 802.11 b/g/n wireless support
- One 10/100/1000 Mbit/s WAN port
- Four 10/100/1000 Mbit/s switched LAN ports
- Integrated USB 2.0 EHCI host port
- Compatible with Windows 7

Version 2:

- Broadcom BCM47186 500 MHz SoC
- 128 MB flash memory
- 128 MB RAM
- 32 kB instruction cache
- 32 kB data cache
- Two internal antennas
- 802.11 b/g/n wireless support
- One 10/100/1000 Mbit/s WAN port
- Four 10/100/1000 Mbit/s switched LAN ports
- Integrated USB 2.0 EHCI host port
- Compatible with Windows 7

== Features ==
There are several ways to identify the version, including a v2 label on version 2.

Version 1:

- Supports installation of Tomato firmware and DD-WRT; the manufacturer has a custom version of OpenWrt while the mainline version works partially
- Supports Wi-Fi Protected Setup (WPS)
- Automatically detects ISP type, exposed host (DMZ), MAC address authentication, URL content filtering, logs and email alerts of internet activity
- Static & dynamic routing with TCP/IP, VPN pass-through (IPsec, L2TP), NAT, PPTP, PPPoE, DHCP (client & server)
- Supports IPv6, including automatic 6to4 tunnel (since firmware 1.2.2.30)

Version 2:

- Supports installation of Tomato firmware (Shibby and Toastman varieties) and DD-WRT

=== Open source features ===
According to one analysis, installing DD-WRT reduced performance.
