= Adaptive quality of service multi-hop routing =

In multi-hop networks, Adaptive Quality of Service routing (AQoS or AQR) protocols have become increasingly popular and have numerous applications. One application in which it may be useful is in Mobile ad hoc networking (MANET).

Adaptive QoS routing is a cross-layer optimization adaptive routing mechanism. The cross-layer mechanism provides up-to-date local QoS information for the adaptive routing algorithm, by considering the impacts of node mobility and lower-layer link performance. The multiple QoS requirements are satisfied by adaptively using forward error correction and multipath routing mechanisms, based on the current network status. The complete routing mechanism includes three parts: (1) a modified dynamic source routing algorithm that handles route discovery and the collection of QoS related parameters; (2) a local statistical computation and link monitoring function located in each node; and (3) an integrated decision-making system to calculate the number of routing paths, coding parity length, and traffic distribution rates.

== Introduction ==
A wireless ad hoc network consists of a collection of mobile nodes interconnected by multihop wireless paths with wireless transmitters and receivers. Such networks can be spontaneously created and operated in a self-organized manner, because they do not rely upon any preexisting network infrastructure.

The emergence of multimedia applications in communications has generated the need to provide mobile quality-of-service (QoS) support in ad hoc networks, and such applications require a stable path to guarantee QoS requirements. However, the topology of ad hoc networks is highly dynamic due to the unpredictable node mobility. In addition, wireless channel bandwidth is limited. So, QoS provisioning in such networks is complex and challenging.

QoS routing usually involves two tasks: collecting and maintaining up-to-date state information about the network and finding feasible paths for a connection based on its QoS requirements. Many approaches currently exist to perform QoS routing, most of which consist of routing across the Network layer of the OSI model only. Some approaches utilize both the Network and Data link layer but do not consider the cross layer behaviors. This makes quantifying the QoS parameters difficult and leads to considerations of QoS but does not guarantee QoS.

To address this problem, appropriate cross-layer cooperation is required. Adaptive QoS schemes provide QoS information by factoring the impacts of node mobility and lower-layer link parameters into QoS performance.

=== Traditional QoS approaches ===
Most QoS approaches tend to focus on only one QoS parameter (e.g., packet loss, end-to-end delay, and bandwidth). For example, while many of the QoS-related schemes are successful in reducing packet loss by adding redundancy in the packet, they do this at the expense of end-to-end delay. Because packet loss and end-to-end delay are inversely related, it may not be possible to find a path that simultaneously satisfies the delay, packet loss, and bandwidth constraints. Some proposed QoS routing algorithms do consider multiple metrics, but without considering cross-layer cooperation. Multipath routing is another type of QoS routing that has received much attention, since it can provide load balancing, fault tolerance, and higher aggregate bandwidth. Although this approach decreases packet loss and end-to-end delay, it is only efficient and reliable if a relationship can be found between the number of paths and QoS constraints.

== Adaptive QoS scheme overview ==
To implement an adaptive multipath routing scheme, three functions distributed in different parts of the network are needed. First, a modified dynamic source routing function is needed. It handles route discovery and collecting the local QoS-related information along the selected routes. Second, there is a local statistical computation and link monitoring function located in each node. This function is used to support the above routing function. It will manage and build the local routing information in each node, which includes a QoS-related table. The third function will be in charge of the final decision-making process. The adaptive routing parameters are derived from the decision-making algorithm based on the QoS constraints. They are the number N of selected paths, parity length k of the FEC, code and the set {R} of the traffic distribution rates on each path. With these functions, adaptive multipath QoS routing is implemented.

QoS requirements can be based on either a delay or a delay and bandwidth requirement, or a packet loss requirement. FEC parity length is derived from the difference between the QoS delay requirement and the average delay on selected paths under the packet-loss constraint. Average packet loss under this FEC scheme is achieved by using multiple routing paths. At the same time, the packet distribution rate on each path is determined under fair packet-loss and load-balance principles. Routing maintenance under the same QoS guarantees is achieved without increasing its computational complexity. This required to be understand.

== Adaptive QoS performance ==
Three functions (routing function, local statistic computation and monitoring function, and integrated decisionmaking function) are implemented in the different parts of the mobile network. Due to the distributed structure, the computation and implementation complexity of the routing scheme are reduced. Also, since routes are discovered based on the up-to-date local information and selected by the optimization computation, routing parameters (e.g., number of paths, FEC parity length, and traffic distribution rate) are dynamic and optimized. In addition to supporting multiple QoS requirements, traffic balancing and bandwidth resources are factored into our decisionmaking process. The distributed structure of the local QoS statistics used in the routing enables this QoS support mechanism to be scalable in mobile networks. Simulation results indicate that the performance (i.e., packet loss and end-to-end delay) are much better and less susceptible to the state changes (i.e., node mobility, transmission power, channel characteristics, and the traffic pattern) of the network, compared to a nonadaptive routing strategy.

== See also ==
- List of ad hoc routing protocols
