= Netgear SC101 =

The SC101 was a home computer networking storage product manufactured and distributed by Netgear under the Storage Central brand from around 2005 through 2010. The devices shared data stored on one or two internal disks via Ethernet links.

== Description ==
The two models in the Storage Central line were the Netgear SC101 and SC101T.

The original SC101 model could hold one or two disks (sold separately) using Parallel ATA (known as "IDE" at the time) and had a 100 Mbit/sec Ethernet over twisted pair interface.

The later Netgear SC101T model could hold one or two Serial ATA disks and had a Gigabit Ethernet interface.

The ZSAN technology was licensed in 2005 from Zetera Corporation.

Reviews praised the low price and ease of installation, but noted limited software support and passive cooling.

At least one reviewer encountered an incompatible disk drive.

By January 2010 the Storage Central series was replaced by Netgear storage products using the ReadyNAS name.

=== Software ===
The SC101 provided a block-level storage area network (SAN) interface, as opposed to file-level network-attached storage (NAS). Thus, like any SAN device, specific drivers and software must be installed on any client PC wishing to access the device. Only the Microsoft Windows family of operating systems were supported.

=== Linux drivers ===
There was discussion of a driver for Linux in 2008. An open source driver for Linux on Google Code used the network block device technology, but because this is a block level device, the OS is responsible for creating a filesystem. Consequently, a filesystem created by Linux will not be compatible with one created by Windows.

However, a 2006 post on kerneltrap.org suggested it may be possible to use NTFS-3g on Linux. If possible, this would allow access from both Windows and Linux machines, at the expense of losing features that the proprietary file system offers, such as sharing the device access across multiple machines, as well as mirroring support.
