= Juan Carlos Da Costa =

Paraguayan politician (1944–1976)

- Born: 1944; Asunción, Paraguay
- Died: 5 April 1976 (aged 31–32); Asunción, Paraguay
- Occupations: Politician, writer

Juan Carlos Da Costa (1944—1976) was a Paraguayan writer, politician, activist, and leader of the clandestine Political Military Organization (OPM), created in the mid 1970s against Alfredo Stroessner's military dictatorship. He died fighting the police on 5 April 1976.

== Youth and studies ==
Da Costa was born in Asunción in 1944, the son of a Bolivian mother and a Paraguayan father, Juan Da Costa, who took her to Asunción to live with him. He studied in the Colegio Nacional de la Capital, from which he was expelled in 1956. During his youth, he had was briefly active in the Liberal Party, and contributed to cultural magazines including Pendulum and Criterion.

He was imprisoned for the first time in August 1967, due to his resistance to the regime of President Alfredo Stroessner, who had taken power of the Republic of Paraguay in 1954 through a coup d'état. Da Costa was tortured in prison, and remained there until 1971 when he was deported to Argentina. Once in Argentina, he continued his attempts to create an organization to lead a revolution in Paraguay.

== Exile ==
In Argentina, Da Costa established relations with many socialist organizations, mostly Montoneros. In 1973, he travelled to Salvador Allende's Chile and met with leaders of the Unidad Popular and the Revolutionary Left Movement. During those years, he began living with Nidia González Talavera, who would be his companion during the rest of the revolutionary struggle. In 1974 he entered Paraguay in secret, and began contacting and organising the first members of the organization that would become the OPM. The movement defined its political views as "revolutionary nationalism", a euphemism for a Leninist movement, which was willing to use guerrilla warfare to fight the dictatorship.

== Death ==
In the early morning of 5 April 1976 the police found Da Costa and other leaders of the OPM at a house in the Herrera neighbourhood of Asunción and killed Da Costa in the ensuing fight.

== Painful Easter ==
His killing was followed by violent repression known as the Painful Easter in which the Stroessner dictatorship arrested and tortured approximately 1,500 peasants and 200 students, many of whom were killed in prison, between April and June of 1976.
