= Interruptible spectrum =

Radio or Wireless systems use radio frequencies or spectrum as the medium for transmitting information from one location to the other. Traditionally each user is given dedicated frequencies on a long term basis. For example, broadcast stations and public safety organizations have dedicated full-time frequencies. Similarly, cellular carriers also have dedicated full-time frequencies that they assign to individual users for the duration of a call.

Interruptible spectrum is a concept for sharing spectrum among multiple prioritized users. It is based on interruptible concepts in other public utilities, mainly the electric power industry, where the commodity is made available at a low price provided that it can be preempted under stated circumstances by other users. The application of this concept to spectrum was first proposed in a conference paper by Federal Communications Commission(FCC) staffers Mark Bykowsky and Michael Marcus in 2002.

In 2003, FCC proposed in Docket 03-108 to use interruptible spectrum for sharing public safety spectrum that has low average use but high peak use with commercial users subject to immediate interruption. In 2004 it decided to implement this proposal by in the narrow context of public safety users sharing with only other local and state government users.

In 2006, FCC proposed in Docket 06-229 that then could be used for sharing public safety spectrum with commercial users in former UHF-TV spectrum after the transition to digital television. In its August 2007 Docket 06-229 decision, FCC voted to implement the 700 MHz Public/Private Partnership, an implementation of interruptible spectrum concepts in the 700 MHz band subject to a minimum bid of $1.4 billion in the band auction. It later designated the Public Safety Spectrum Trust to represent public safety interests in this band and negotiate with the auction winner for a mutual agreement on band use and public and private access to it.
