= Organización Primero de Marzo =

Clandestine organization in Paraguay

The Organizacion Primero de Marzo (abbr. OPM; transl. First of March Organization) was a clandestine movement created in Paraguay in the mid 70s to fight General Alfredo Stroessner's dictatorship. It was the most serious attempt at creating an armed resistance to the dictator's repressive government. Even though the organization was discovered before it was capable of attacking in the government in any way, the wave of repression which followed the discovery was enormous. During that period of repression, several leaders of the organization were captured, tortured and then executed, but the violence also extended to many regions of the country, affecting several agrarian movements and agrarian workers that had nothing to do with the OPM.

== Historical context ==
Ruling the country since 1954, Stroessner had already avoided the few attempts of assassinate him in the past and had dealt with every single one of the opposition who represented a menace to him. During the 70's, the country was in a period of economic growth, due to the construction of the hydroelectric Itaipu dam, on the Paraná River, on the border with Brazil, and also thanks to the exportation of soya and cotton.

== Da Costa, the leader ==
Juan Carlos Da Costa, who had been active in student movements and had collaborated in some literary magazines, was the main leader and the one who came up with the idea of creating a revolutionary clandestine movement.

Da Costa was used to moving around, having visited Santiago de Chile and Corrientes where he met several leaders of the Argentine movement Montoneros. More than a thousand Paraguayans were studying in Corrientes at the time. Da Costa began making contact with some of the student"s leaders that were anxious to return to Paraguay to make the revolution through the means of violence due to the lack of political rights and the apathy of the traditional parties of the opposition.

== The development of the organization ==
In Asunción, the organization grew quickly through the student movements in the university, mainly through the Independent Movement. Most of the students of the Independent Movement would join the OPM later on. The Student Group, a clandestine organization of college students and high school students, with a similar structure of the Montoneros, was created by the OPM.

Later on, the organization would extend to the rural areas, where the Agrarian Christian Leagues were the main agrarian organizations of the country. In 1975, the National Conduction of the OPM was integrated by Juan Carlos Da Costa, his couple, Nidia González Talavera and the agrarian leader Constantino Coronel.

The political proposition of the organization was based in a mutual cooperation between the proletariat and the agrarian workers, and the construction of a party with a Marxist–Leninist ideology, but the definition of the political view of the organization was too unclear yet.

In fact, the OPM never reached the level of organization that Da Costa desired. The military training was far too poor and the level of security too. Actually, the OPM had, approximately 400 members in 1976. Most of these members didn"t have a political or military background and just a few of them had the power to make decisions.

== Carlos Brañas ==
On April 3, 1976, Carlos Brañas, a Paraguayan medicine student of Corrientes, is caught when he enters Paraguay through the Paraná River in a boat. He brought with him a bunch of the organization"s papers, including the clandestine magazine of the organization. Through his detention, the police found out the existence of the clandestine organization and began the investigation that would lead to the imprisonment and the execution of most of the OPM members, including Juan Carlos Da Costa.

The night of April 4, a police brigade broke into Mario Schaerer Prono's house, an OPM member. After a brief shooting where Juan Carlos Da Costa first shot Alberto Cantero, the police chief and a powerful man at the time, and then the police killed Da Costa. Mario Schaerer Prono and his wife Guillermina Kannonnikoff managed to escape through the backyard of the house and hid in the school San Cristóbal, where they both taught. A short time after, the police found both of them. Mario was tortured to death.

== Painful Easter ==
The repression continued and in the next days the police would imprison hundreds of agrarian workers. Some of the victims of the repression had nothing to do with the OPM, but lived near the areas where the OPM worked. The press call the repression, "the Painful Easter", due to the time where it took place, Easter.

The repression did not affect only the OPM. The police took advantage of the episode to hit persons and institutions that were not linked to the organization but that were considered to be hostile by the regime. Most of the prisoners the police took during the repression were liberated in the days, weeks or following months. Almost all of them suffered torture. This is undoubtedly the most important repressive episode of Stroessner's dictatorship.
