= Dynamic spectrum management =

Dynamic spectrum management (DSM), also referred to as dynamic spectrum access (DSA), is a set of techniques based on theoretical concepts in network information theory and game theory that is being researched and developed to improve the performance of a communication network as a whole. The concept of DSM also draws principles from the fields of cross-layer optimization, artificial intelligence, machine learning, etc. It has been recently made possible by the availability of software-defined radio due to development of fast enough processors both at servers and at terminals. These are techniques for cooperative optimization. This can also be compared or related to optimization of one link in the network on the account of losing performance on many links negatively affected by this single optimization.

It is most commonly applied to optimize digital subscriber line (DSL) performance of a network. Another potential application of DSM is for cognitive radio.

Important and common principles of DSM include:

- Link adaptation
- Bandwidth management
- Multi-user MIMO
- Pre-cancellation of estimated interference
- Combining unused channels (not pre-allocated) for a single user or bonding

== DSM in Digital Subscribers Loop ==
DSM can be achieved over ordinary copper phone lines' network by reducing or eliminating crosstalk, interference and near–far problem within a DSL network especially affecting the DSL phone lines that are close together in a binder.

The technique involves multiple methods:

- Continuously monitoring the status of interfering signal levels using current bit-loading compared to maximum achievable bit rate, number of errored seconds, number of severely errored seconds, number of forward error corrections (FEC) and making decisions about the underperforming scenario's cause and forcing the link to train in a specific way.
- Identifying the neighborhood cables in the binders that may be causing unwanted cross-talk and lowering their upstream transmission power until bit-rates are optimized for the network.
- Increasing or decreasing the amount of forward error correction overhead applied to the signal propagating on the cable in response to the severity of the correlated interferers or jammers.
- Modifying the limits on the power levels allowed on cable, the masks of the tones on which bits can be loaded or the masks for power spectral density to allow for minimization of the interference caused due to excess signal-to-noise ratio (SNR) causing degradation of SNR on other lines.
- Modem hardware (consumer premises equipment) adjusting transmission settings in order to achieve the optimized discrete multitone modulation (DMT) signal (this is not exactly DSM and can be achieved even without DSM). This hardware adjustment being forced from a central monitoring location and applied to a network of consumer premises equipment, on the whole, to optimize the network performance as a whole.

== DSM in Wireless Networks ==
An important application of dynamic spectrum access is in wireless networks. Spectrum, as the key resource for wireless communications, plays a major role in network key performance indicators like coverage, quality of service, energy efficiency, and reliability. Most wireless communication services are provided under a fixed spectrum allocation predefined by regulators and assigned by auctions to the operators. This spectrum allocation process is highly inefficient, leading to significant spectrum underutilization. Despite the increasing improvements in the spectral efficiency of wireless technologies, the demand for bandwidth exceeds the availability of spectrum for new communication services and networks. Paradoxically, several spectrum surveys demonstrate that the spatial and temporal use of the sub-3 GHz spectrum is less than 20% world wide and less than 11% in rural areas. In this context, Dynamic Spectrum Access (DSA) networks enable the opportunistic use of unused or underutilized spectrum in specific areas or at particular times. By leveraging licensed but unused spectrum or by better distributing spectrum according to the dynamic demand of services, higher spectrum efficiency can be achieved.

Some dynamic spectrum access and management techniques and methods include:

- Collaborative spectrum sensing where multiple cognitive radio nodes leverage AI models to detect unused spectrum by jointly identifying primary user signals and self-detecting hidden nodes, thereby avoiding interference.
- Spectrum prediction, where machine learning models forecast future spectrum availability using historical usage data, enhancing spectrum utilization efficiency.
- Spectrum decision and allocation is where the optimal spectrum band is dynamically selected for a certain service, area, and period of time based on current availability, user needs, network conditions, and spectrum quality.
- Real-time interference management by reinforcement learning algorithms enabling cognitive radios to adaptively manage and mitigate interference from other devices in real-time.

== See also ==
- Interruptible spectrum
