= Organizational project management =

Organizational Project Management is defined as the execution of an organization's strategies through projects by combining the systems of portfolio management, program management, and project management. This definition was approved by a team of hundreds of professionals from 35 countries and was published as part of the Project Management Institute's (PMI's) Organizational Project Management Maturity Model standard in 2003 and updated later to a second edition in 2008 when it also became an ANSI standard. The standard was updated to a third edition in 2013. The term "Organizational Project Management" should be capitalized because the term is a conventional designation for exactly the systems of processes elaborated in ANSI/PMI 08-004-2008, because it is a proper name for that system and that system is definitive and regimented in its application, and because it does not denote generically any project management that is done in organizations.

== Definition ==
According to PMI (2003, 2008, 2013)

Organizational Project Management is the systematic management of projects, programs, and portfolios in alignment with the achievement of strategic goals. The concept of organizational project management is based on the idea that there is a correlation between an organization's capabilities in project management, program management, and portfolio management and the organization's effectiveness in implementing strategy.

== See also ==
- Organizational Project Management Maturity Model
- Program management
- Project Management Institute
- Project management
- Portfolio management
- Systems thinking
