= Netgear =

American multinational technology company

Netgear, Inc.
- Type: Public
- Traded as: Nasdaq: NTGR
- Industry: Networking equipment
- Founded: January 8, 1996; 30 years ago
- Founders: Patrick Lo; Mark G. Merrill
- Headquarters: San Jose, California, U.S.
- Key people: Charles Prober (CEO); Bryan Murray (CFO)
- Products: Routers; DSL/cable gateways; Switches; Wireless access points; Network attached storage; Surveillance IP cameras
- Revenue: ▼US$674 million (2024)
- Operating income: ▲US$12.2 million (2024)
- Net income: ▲US$12.4 million (2024)
- Total assets: ▲US$850 million (2024)
- Total equity: ▲US$541 million (2024)
- Number of employees: 655 (2024)
- Website: netgear.com

Netgear, Inc. (stylized as NETGEAR in all caps) is an American computer networking company based in San Jose, California, with offices in about 22 other countries. It produces networking hardware for consumers, businesses, and service providers. The company operates in three business segments: retail, commercial, and as a service provider.

Netgear's products cover a variety of widely used technologies such as wireless (Wi-Fi, LTE and 5G), Ethernet and powerline, with a focus on reliability and ease-of-use. The products include wired and wireless devices for broadband access and network connectivity, and are available in multiple configurations to address the needs of the end-users in each geographic region and sector in which the company's products are sold.

As of 2020, Netgear products are sold in approximately 24,000 retail locations around the globe, and through approximately 19,000 value-added resellers, as well as multiple major cable, mobile and wireline service providers around the world.

== History ==
Netgear was founded by Patrick Lo in 1996. On January 31, 2024, NETGEAR announced Patrick Lo's retirement from CEO and the Board of Directors, and CJ Prober became CEO.

The company was listed on the NASDAQ stock exchange in 2003.

== Product range ==
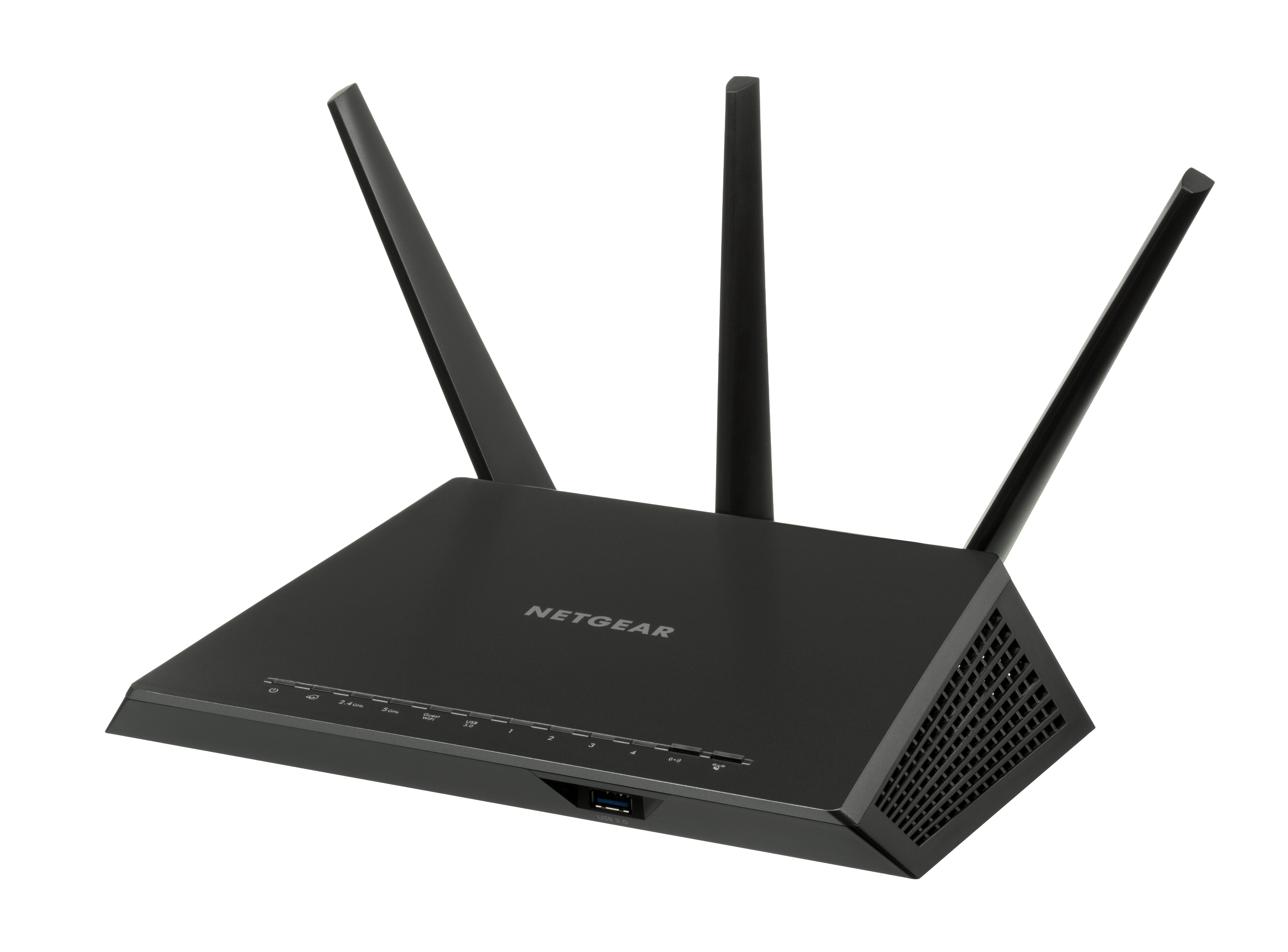
The AC1900 dual band, wireless router

=== Consumer Products ===
Netgear creates products that deliver networking technology through a range of products that deliver streaming and storage solutions. These products include Home WiFi, Mobile Wifi, and Wired Networking.

Products targeted at Consumers includes the Orbi and Nighthawk product lines, which deliver products including Mesh WiFi systems, cable modems and routers, WiFi range extenders, gaming routers, mobile WiFi, Mobile Hotspots, and Switches and Powerlines.

=== Business products ===
Netgear provides networking, storage, and security solutions to small to mid-sized businesses. Products that serve businesses include wireless and wired networking, mobile Wi-Fi, routers, software, and applications.

Products offered include Ethernet switches, wireless access points, routers, insight remote management, and audio-visual solutions.

Netgear's focus is primarily on the networking market, with products for home and business use, as well as pro-gaming, including wired and wireless technology. Netgear also has a wide range of Wi-Fi range extenders

=== ProSAFE switches ===
Netgear markets network products for the business sector, most notably the ProSAFE switch range. As of May 2007, Netgear provides limited lifetime warranties for ProSAFE products for as long as the original buyer owns the product. Currently focusing on multimedia segment and business product.

=== Network appliances ===
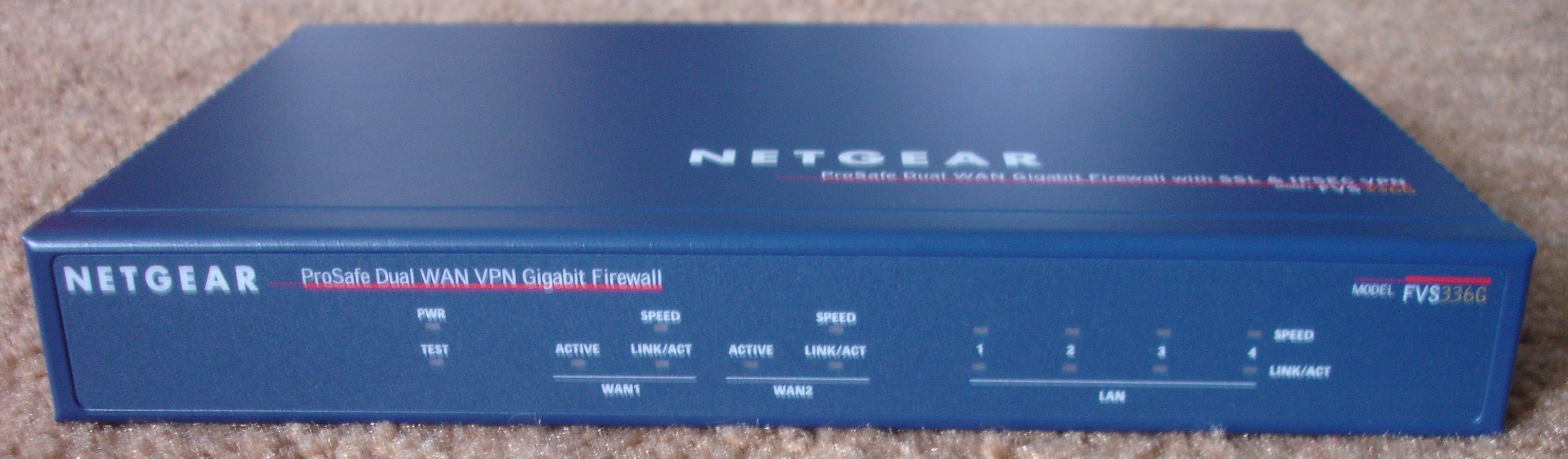
Dual WAN Gigabit VPN Firewall FVS336G

Netgear also markets network appliances for the business sector, including managed switches and wired and wireless VPN firewalls. In 2016, Netgear released its Orbi mesh Wi-Fi system, with models for business as well as household use. The system uses a tri-band architecture, similar to the traditional dual-band, but with a dedicated 5 GHz connection between the router and a provided satellite. The addition of a second 5 GHz channel allows the network to distribute its traffic, easing congestion caused by the increasing number of 5 GHz compatible wireless devices present in many household networks. In September 2017, Netgear exited the VPN firewall product category. At CES 2021, the company unveiled the world's first WiFi 6E router that takes advantage of the 6 GHz frequency band in addition to the 5 GHz and 2.4 GHz bands. The 6 GHz frequency increases network capacity where there is high utilization of the 5 GHz and 2.4 GHz bands.

=== Network-attached storage ===
Netgear sells NAS devices to small businesses and consumers under the product name ReadyNAS. With this storage hardware line, Netgear vies with competitors like Buffalo, Zyxel and HP. Netgear entered the storage market in May 2007 when it acquired Infrant (originator of the ReadyNAS line). In March 2009, Netgear began to offer an integrated online backup solution called the ReadyNAS Vault. In June 2022 all ReadyNAS product pages was removed and replaced with a link to warranty and support information. Netgear has not yet (August 2022) confirmed that it has withdrawn from the network-connected storage market and discontinued the ReadyNAS product line.

=== Network surveillance cameras ===
Netgear created home surveillance camera brand Arlo, which was spun out into a separate company in August 2018. Arlo is now publicly traded on the New York Stock Exchange.

=== Netgear chipsets ===
Netgear uses Realtek chipsets, which can run in monitor mode and perform wireless injection. For this function, a special driver is needed.

== Manufacturing ==
NETGEAR’s primary manufacturers are Cloud Network Technology (more commonly known as Hon Hai Precision or Foxconn Corporation), Delta Electronics Incorporated, Senao Networks, Inc., and Pegatron Corporation, all of which are headquartered in Taiwan. They distribute their manufacturing among a limited number of key suppliers and seek to avoid excessive concentration with any one single supplier.

Manufacturing occurs primarily in Vietnam, Thailand, Indonesia, and Taiwan.

To maintain quality standards, Netgear has established its own product quality organization, based in Singapore and Taiwan, that is responsible for auditing and inspecting process and product quality on the premises of ODMs and JDMs (Joint Development Manufacturers).

Netgear was unaffected by US President Donald Trump's 25% tariffs on Chinese imports. Because all manufacturing is outsourced, the company was able to shift its production lines from China to Vietnam, Thailand and Indonesia.

== Product security concerns ==
In 2014, various Netgear products that were manufactured by SerComm were found to contain a backdoor that allowed unauthorized remote access to the affected devices. Netgear, along with other companies with products manufactured by SerComm that were affected by the aforementioned backdoor, issued firmware updates for some affected products. However, it was shortly found that the updates merely hid the backdoor but did not remove it.

A backdoor also existed on the DG834 series. Any person who can access the router using a web browser, can enable "debug" mode using [IP_ADDR]/setup.cgi?todo=debug and then connect via Telnet directly to the router's embedded Linux system as 'root', which gives unfettered access to the router's operating system via its Busybox functionality.

In January 2017, various Netgear products were found to be vulnerable to an exploit that allows third-party access to the router and the internal network and to turn the router into a botnet.

This vulnerability occurs when an attacker can access the internal network or when remote management is enabled on the router. Remote management is turned off by default; users can turn on remote management through advanced settings. Firmware fixes are currently available for the affected devices.

In 2020, a vulnerability was discovered that affected many Netgear home WiFi routers. The problem was in a web server built into the router's firmware. When launching the administration interface, the owner had to enter their password, which was not protected by security. The exploit was posted on GitHub. Netgear issued a security advisory and firmware update to address the issue.

== See also ==
- Bay Networks § Acquisition by Nortel
- Netgear DG834
- Netgear Switch Discovery Protocol
- Netgear SC101
- Netgear WGR614L
- Netgear WNR3500L
