= Optical performance monitoring =

Optical performance monitoring (OPM) is used for managing high capacity dense wavelength-division multiplexing (DWDM) optical transmission and switching systems in next-generation networks (NGNs). OPM involves assessing the quality of data channel by measuring its optical characteristics without directly looking at the transmitted sequence of bits. It is a potential mechanism to improve control of transmission and physical layer fault management in optical transmission systems.

In optical communications, typical roles for optical performance monitoring include ensuring correct switching in reconfigurable optical add-drop multiplexers, setting levels for dynamic equalization of the gain of optical amplifiers, and providing system alarms and error warning for lost or out of specification optical channels.

The optical component used for this purpose in DWDM networks is known as optical performance monitor (OPM) or optical channel monitor (OCM), which measures channel power, wavelength, and optical signal-to-noise ratio (OSNR) for each channel.
