= Cross-layer optimization =

Cross-layer optimization is an escape from the pure waterfall-like concept of the OSI communications model with virtually strict boundaries between layers. The cross layer approach transports feedback dynamically via the layer boundaries to enable the compensation for overload, latency or other mismatch of requirements and resources by any control input to another layer, but that layer directly affected by the detected deficiency.

Strict boundaries between layers are enforced in the original OSI networking model, where functional data is kept strictly within a given layer. Cross‑layer optimization removes such strict boundaries to allow functional communication between layers by permitting one layer to access the data of another layer to exchange information and enable interaction. For example, having knowledge of the current physical state will help a channel allocation scheme or automatic repeat request (ARQ) strategy at the MAC layer in optimizing tradeoffs and achieving throughput maximization.

Especially in information routing with concurrent demand for limited capacity of channels there may be a need for a concept of intervention to balance between e.g. the needs of intelligible speech transmission and of sufficiently dynamic control commands. Any fixed allocation of resources will lead to a mismatch under special conditions of operations. Any highly dynamic change of resource allocation might affect the intelligibility of voice, the steadiness of videos or - more generally - might disrupt data flows. However, as with other optimizing strategies, the algorithm consumes time as well.

== Principles ==
There are principles that a cross-layer design must adhere to:

- Interactions and the Law of Unintended Consequences
- Dependency Graph
- Timescale Separation and Stability
- The Chaos of Unbridled Cross-Layer Design

Unlike a traditional architectural design approach, where designers can focus on a single problem without worrying about the rest of the protocol stack, one must be careful to prevent unintended effects on other parts of the system. Dependency graphs are helpful for adaptation loops that occur using cross-layer design.

== Applications ==
Cross-layer optimization can be used for

- adaptation
- scheduling
- resource allocation
- power control
- congestion control
- multihop routing

Its advantages include high adaptivity in a Wireless sensor network and a larger optimization space.

== Adjusting quality of service ==
Cross-layer optimization shall contribute to an improvement of quality of services under various operational conditions. Such adaptive quality of service management is currently subject of various patent applications, as e.g. The cross-layer control mechanism provides a feedback on concurrent quality information for the adaptive setting of control parameters. The control scheme apply

- the observed quality parameters
- a fuzzy logic based reasoning about applying the appropriate control strategy
- the statistically computed control input to parameter settings and mode switches

== Tailoring to resource efficiency of cross-layer ==
The quality aspect is not the only approach to tailor the cross-layer optimization strategy. The control adjusted to availability of limited resources is the first mandatory step to achieve at least a minimum level of quality. Respective studies have been performed and will continue.

== Adapting MAC scheduling based on PHY parameters ==
Communication systems that need to operate over media with non stationary background noise and interference may benefit from having a close coordination between the MAC layer (which is responsible for scheduling transmissions) and the PHY layer (which manages actual transmission and reception of data over the media).

In some communications channels (for example, in power lines), noise and interference may be non-stationary and might vary synchronously with the 50 or 60 Hz alternating current cycle. In scenarios like this, the overall system performance can be improved if the MAC can get information from the PHY regarding when and how the noise and interference level is changing, so that the MAC can schedule transmission during the periods of time in which noise and interference levels are lower.

An example of a communications system that allows this kind of Cross-layer optimization is the ITU-T G.hn standard, which provides high-speed local area networking over existing home wiring (power lines, phone lines and coaxial cables).

== Issues ==
Some issues may arise with cross-layer design and optimization by creating unwanted effects as explained in. Cross-layer design solutions that allow optimized operation for mobile devices in the modern heterogeneous wireless environment are described in, where in addition the major open technical challenges in the cross-layer design research area are pointed out.

== See also ==
- Cognitive networks
- OSI model
