= Public Safety Spectrum Trust =

The Public Safety Spectrum Trust Corporation (PSST) was a non-profit organization which represents the radio spectrum needs of police, fire and ambulance agencies in the United States.

The PSST was selected by the Federal Communications Commission (FCC) as the Public Safety Broadband Licensee (PSBL) for the 10 MHz of 700 MHz public safety nationwide broadband spectrum.

In 2006, the FCC proposed in Docket 06-229 that they could be used for sharing public safety spectrum with commercial users in former UHF-TV spectrum after the transition to digital television. In its August 2007 Docket 06-229 decision, the FCC voted to implement the 700 MHz Public/Private Partnership, an implementation of interoperable spectrum concepts in the 700 MHz band subject to a minimum bid of $1.4 billion in the band auction. It later designated the Public Safety Spectrum Trust to represent public safety interests in this band and negotiate with the auction winner for a mutual agreement on band use and public and private access to it.

The block which was auctioned is commonly referred to as the D Block. Conditions of the auction would have required the winning bidder to fund the build-out of a nationwide broadband interoperable communications system for public safety use in the PSST's 10 MHz of spectrum. The auction was not successful in attracting a bidder to meet the minimum bid threshold. In addition, the winning bidder would have been required to allow public safety use to preempt commercial use on the D Block during emergencies.

== PSST Member Organizations ==
The board of directors of the PSST is made up of representatives of the following organizations:

- American Association of State Highway and Transportation Officials (AASHTO)
- American Hospital Association (AHA)
- Association of Public-Safety Communications Officials-International (APCO)
- Forestry Conservation Communications Association (FCCA)
- International Association of Chiefs of Police (IACP)
- International Association of Fire Chiefs (IAFC)
- International City/County Management Association (ICMA)
- International Municipal Signal Association (IMSA)
- National Association of State Emergency Medical Services Officials (NASEMSO)
- National Association of State 9-1-1 Administrators (NASNA)
- National Emergency Management Association (NEMA)
- National Emergency Number Association (NENA)
- National Fraternal Order of Police (NFOP)
- National Governors Association (NGA)
- National Sheriffs' Association (NSA)

== PSST Executives ==
- Harlin McEwen (chairman), IACP
- Kevin McGinnis (Vice-chairman), NASEMSO
- Alan Caldwell (Secretary-Treasurer), IAFC

== PSST Board of Directors ==
FINAL MEMBERS

- William Brownlow, AASHTO
- John T. Collins, AHA
- Chris Fischer, APCO
- Paul Leary, FCCA
- Harlin McEwen (chairman), IACP
- Alan Caldwell (Secretary-Treasurer), IAFC
- Mark Ryckman, ICMA
- Douglas Aiken, IMSA
- Kevin McGinnis (Vice-chairman), NASEMSO
- Richard Taylor, NASNA
- Michael Cline, NEMA
- Rick Galway, NENA
- David Hiller, NFOP
- Ray Lehr, NGA
- Paul Fitzgerald, NSA

PAST MEMBERS

- Jason Barbour, NENA
- John Contestabile, NGA
- Craig Jorgenson, APCO
