= Disappointment Peak (California) =

Mountain in the state of California

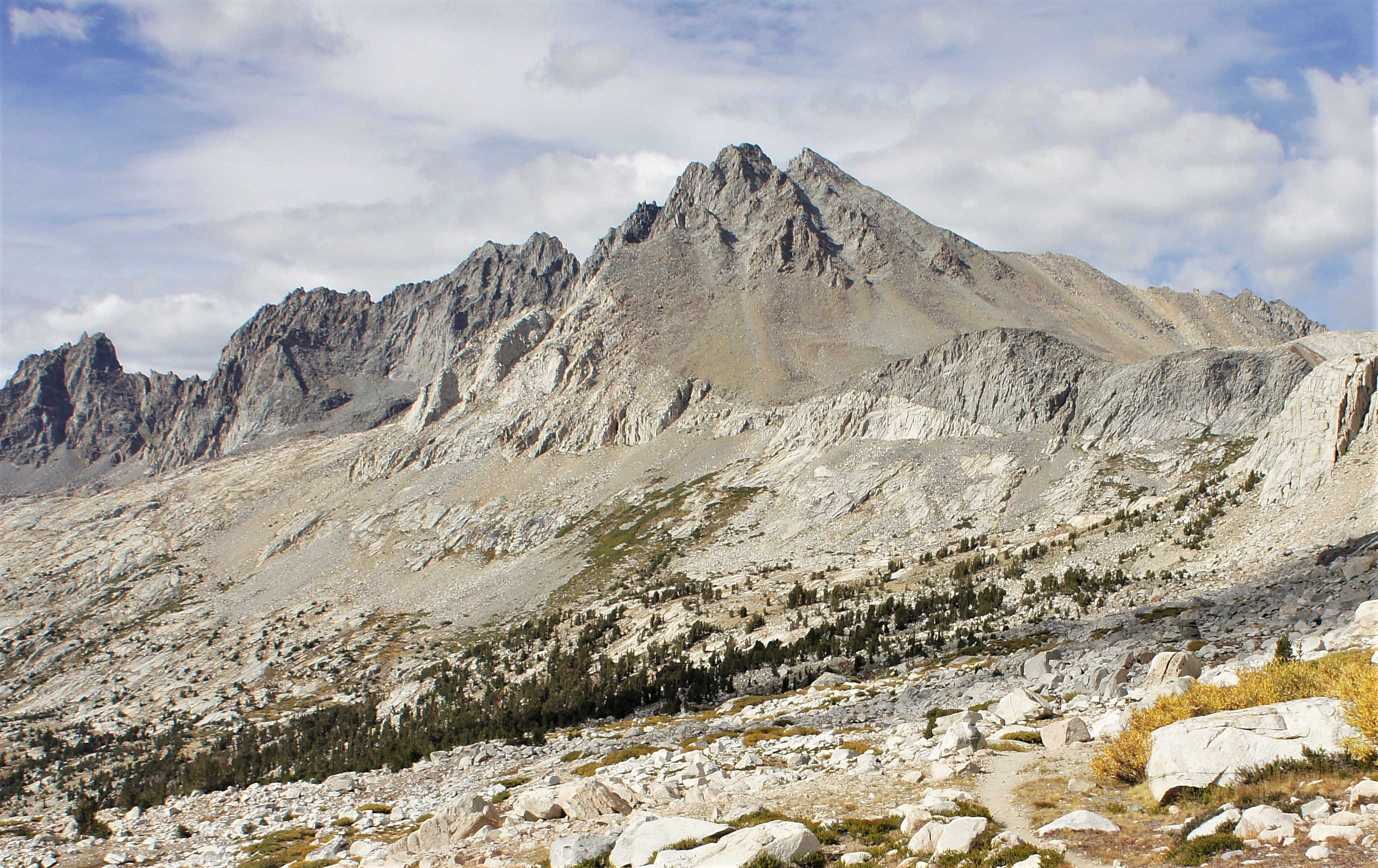
- South aspect, seen from JMT

Highest point
- Elevation: 13,917 ft (4,242 m)
- Prominence: 137 ft (42 m)
- Parent peak: Middle Palisade (14,018 ft)
- Isolation: 0.19 mi (0.31 km)
- Listing: Sierra Peaks Section; Vagmarken Club Sierra Crest List
- Coordinates: 37°04′04″N 118°28′03″W

Geography
- Location within California Location within the United States
- Location: Kings Canyon National Park; Fresno / Inyo Counties; California, U.S.
- Parent range: Sierra Nevada
- Topo map: USGS Split Mountain

Geology
- Rock age: Cretaceous
- Mountain type: Fault block
- Rock type: Granodiorite

Climbing
- First ascent: 1919
- Easiest route: class 4+

Disappointment Peak is a 13,917-foot-elevation (4,242-meter) summit located on the shared boundary of Fresno County and Inyo County in California, United States.

== Description ==
The peak is set on the crest of the Sierra Nevada mountain range in the Palisades area. It also straddles the border shared by Kings Canyon National Park and John Muir Wilderness. It is situated 0.2 miles (0.32 km) southeast of line parent Middle Palisade, and 1.2 miles (1.9 km) west of The Thumb. Topographic relief is significant as the summit rises 3,300 feet (1,000 meters) above Palisades Lakes in approximately one mile. Precipitation runoff from this mountain drains north to Big Pine Creek, as well as south and west into Palisade Creek which is a tributary of the Middle Fork Kings River. The John Muir Trail, which passes below the south base of the peak, provides an approach option.

== History ==
The first ascent of the summit was made July 20, 1919, by J. M. Davies, A. L. Jordan, and H. H. Bliss via the Southwest Chute, and the Northeast Couloir was first climbed by Norman Clyde on June 20, 1930. The West Face (class 5.10) was first climbed in September 1986 by Galen Rowell and Dan Frankl. This mountain's toponym has been officially adopted by the United States Board on Geographic Names. The toponym recognizes the "disappointment" the first ascent party felt when finding themselves on this summit instead of Middle Palisade, which they thought they were climbing. They left a note in a can which stated: "The undersigned made a first ascent of this peak this day and were disappointed not to find it the highest point of the Middle Palisade. We hereby christen this summit 'Peak Disappointment'". It would be exactly twenty years to the day after the disappointing first ascent, that the difficult traverse from Disappointment Peak to Middle Palisade would first be accomplished by David Brower, Bruce Meyer, and Keith Taylor.

== Climate ==
Disappointment Peak is located in an alpine climate zone. Most weather fronts originate in the Pacific Ocean, and travel east toward the Sierra Nevada mountains. As fronts approach, they are forced upward by the peaks (orographic lift), causing them to drop their moisture in the form of rain or snowfall onto the range. This climate supports the Middle Palisade Glacier on the north slope below the summit.

== Gallery ==
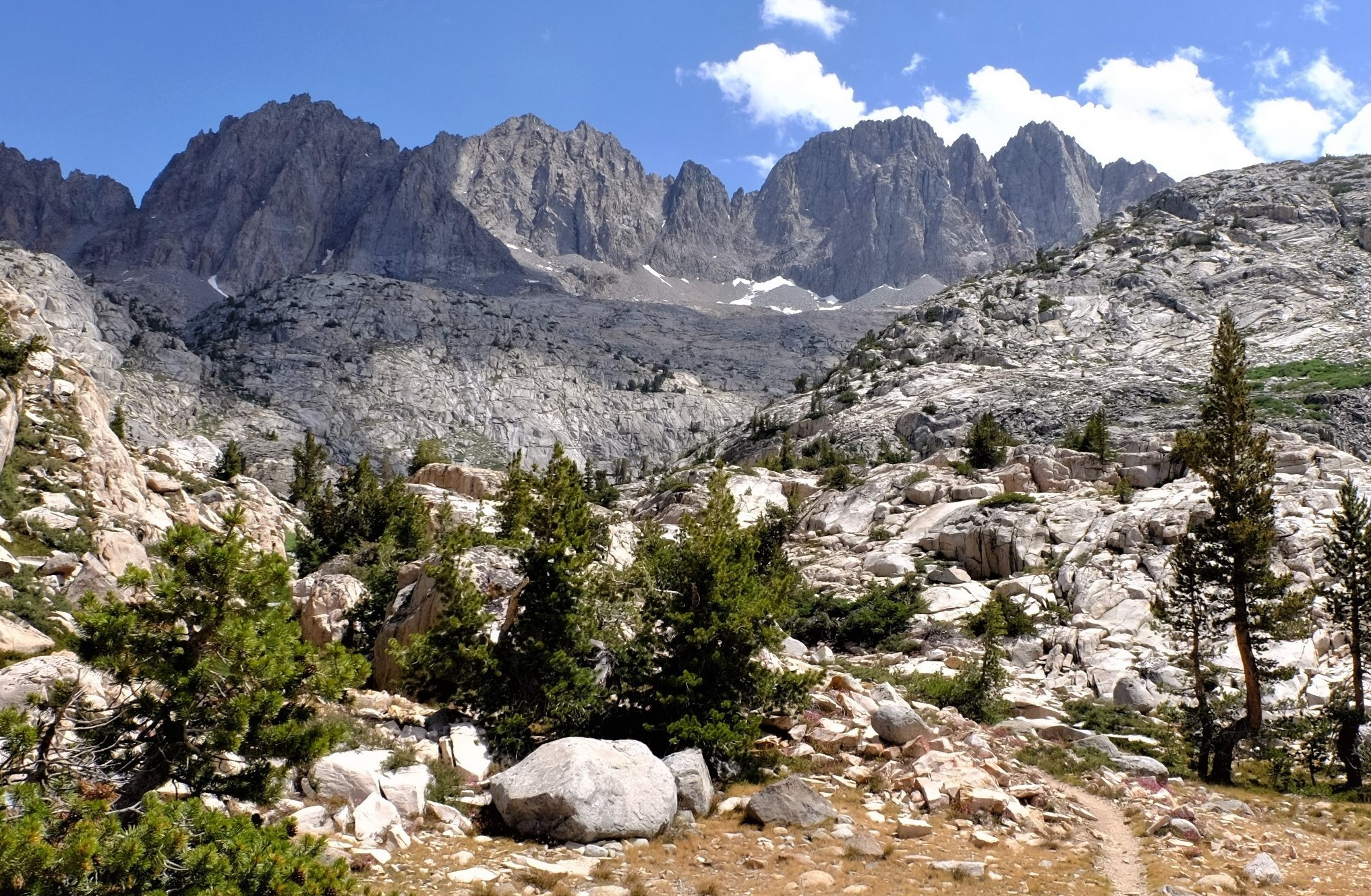
Southwest aspects of Norman Clyde Peak, Middle Palisade, and Disappointment Peak (furthest right)

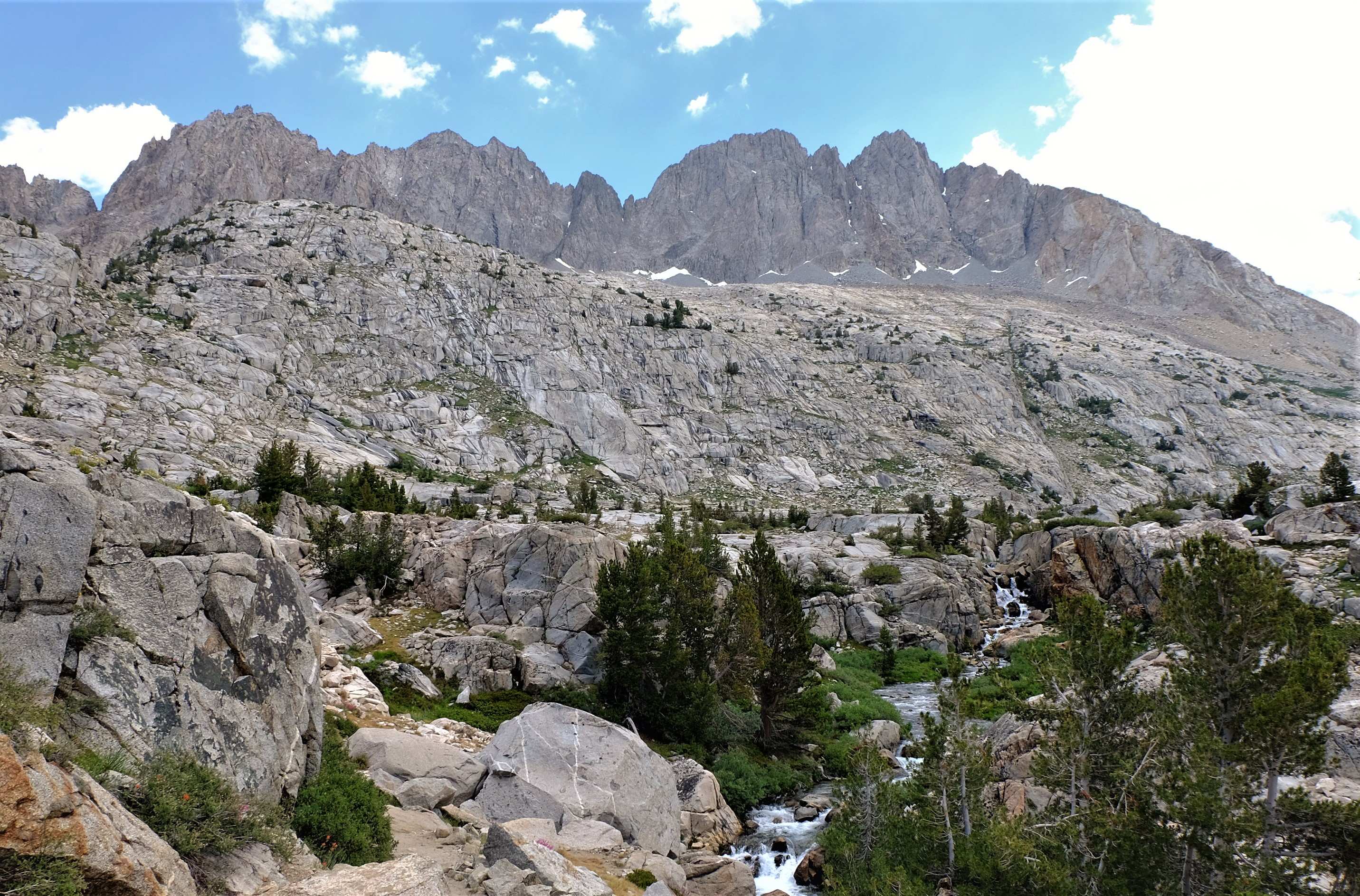
Looking up at southwest aspects of Norman Clyde Peak, Middle Palisade, and Disappointment Peak (furthest right).

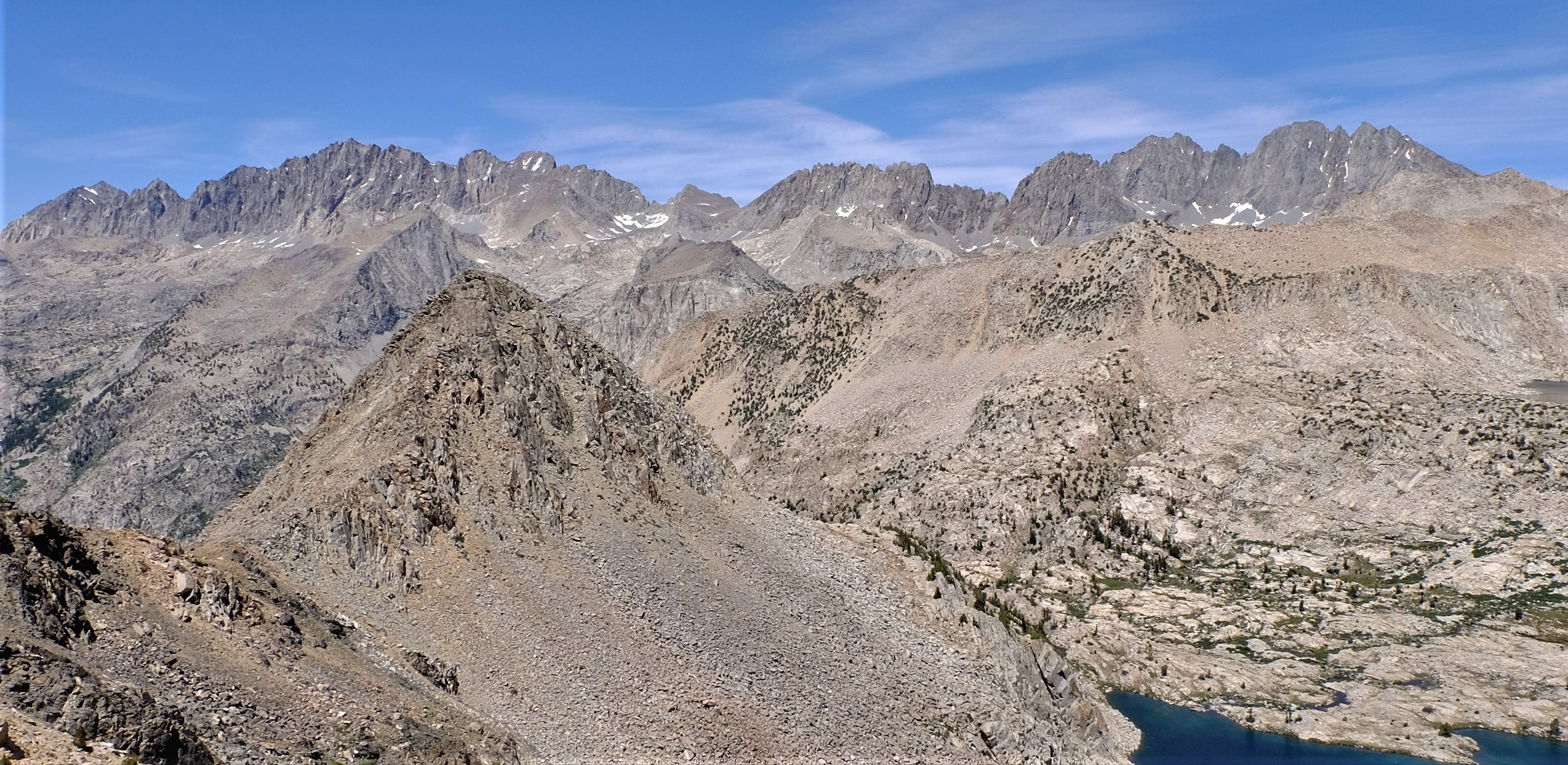
North Palisade to left and Middle Palisade to right. Disappointment Peak is last summit to the right. Camera is pointed north from the east side of Observation Peak.

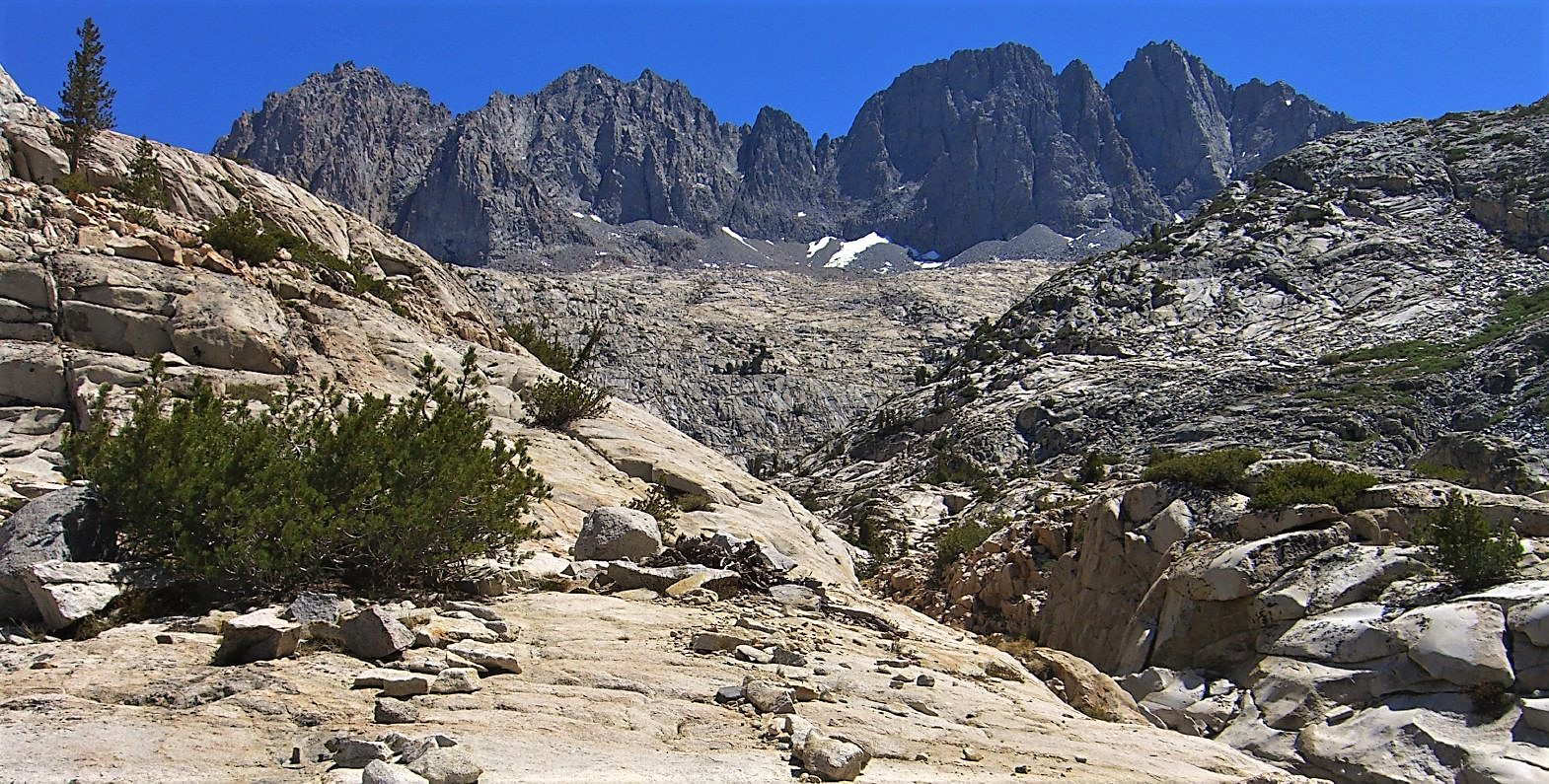
Looking up at southwest aspects of Norman Clyde Peak, Middle Palisade, and Disappointment Peak (furthest right).

== See also ==
- Sequoia-Kings Canyon Wilderness
