= The Thumb (California) =

Mountain in the American state of California

- East Palisade
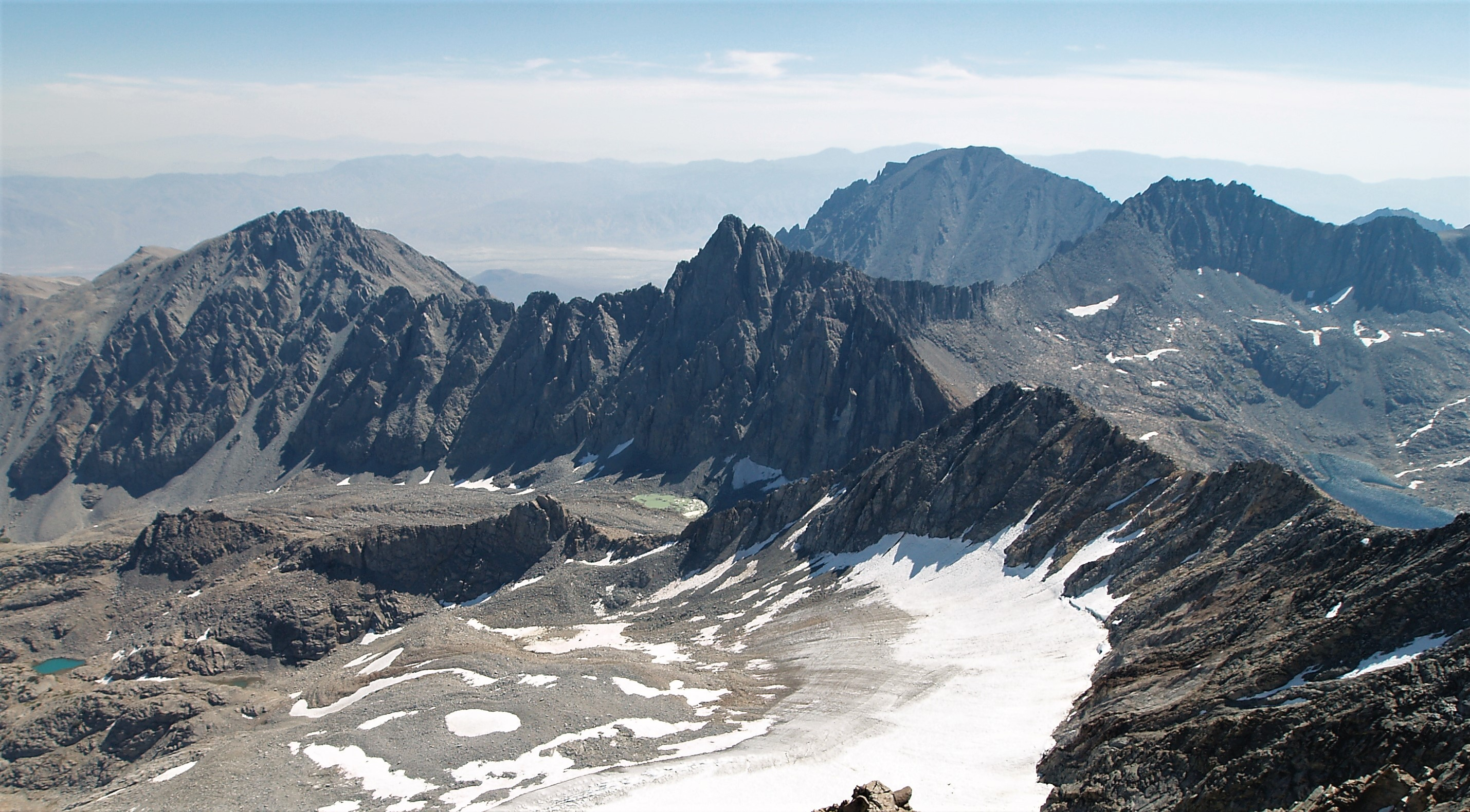
- The Thumb centered, west aspect

Highest point
- Elevation: 13,356 ft (4,071 m)
- Prominence: 594 ft (181 m)
- Parent peak: Ed Lane Peak (13,577 ft)
- Isolation: 0.93 mi (1.50 km)
- Listing: Sierra Peaks Section
- Coordinates: 37°04′17″N 118°26′46″W

Geography
- Location within California Location within the United States
- Location: Inyo County, California, U.S.
- Parent range: Sierra Nevada; Palisades
- Topo map: USGS Split Mountain

Geology
- Rock age: Cretaceous
- Mountain type: Fault block
- Rock type: granitic

Climbing
- First ascent: 1921
- Easiest route: class 2 Southeast slope

The Thumb is a 13,356-foot-elevation (4,071-meter) mountain summit located on the crest of the Sierra Nevada mountain range, in Inyo County of northern California. It is situated in the Palisades area of the John Muir Wilderness, on land managed by Inyo National Forest. It is 1.3 miles (2.1 km) east of Middle Palisade, 1.6 miles (2.6 km) west-northwest of Birch Mountain, and 1.8 miles (2.9 km) north of Mount Bolton Brown. The Thumb ranks as the 83rd-highest summit in California. Topographic relief is significant as the east aspect rises over 2,500 feet (760 meters) above Birch Lake in approximately one mile. The John Muir Trail traverses below the southwest aspect of the mountain, providing an optional approach access.

== History ==
The first ascent of the summit was made December 12, 1921, by Windsor B. Putnam via the southeast slope and an approach from Birch Creek. The class 4 northwest face was first climbed June 5, 1930, by Norman Clyde. This mountain's name was submitted for consideration by Windsor B. Putnam, and officially adopted in 1926 by the U.S. Board on Geographic Names. This peak has in the past been called "East Palisade" and "Thumb Peak".

== Climate ==
The Thumb has an alpine climate which supports the Middle Palisade Glacier below the western cliffs. Most weather fronts originate in the Pacific Ocean, and travel east toward the Sierra Nevada mountains. As fronts approach, they are forced upward by the peaks, causing them to drop their moisture in the form of rain or snowfall onto the range (orographic lift). Precipitation runoff from this mountain drains to Owens Valley via Big Pine and Birch Creeks.

== Gallery ==
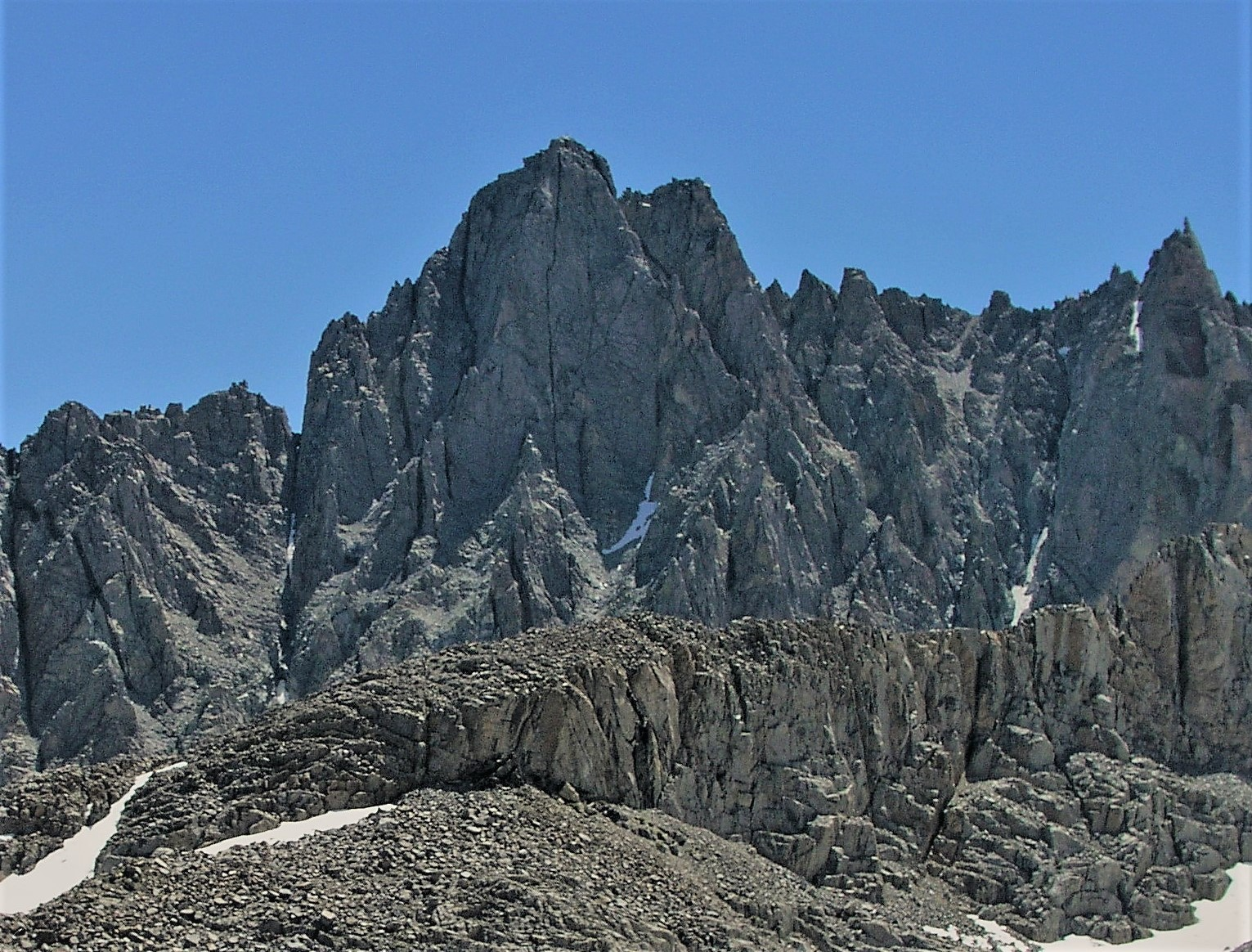
Northwest aspect

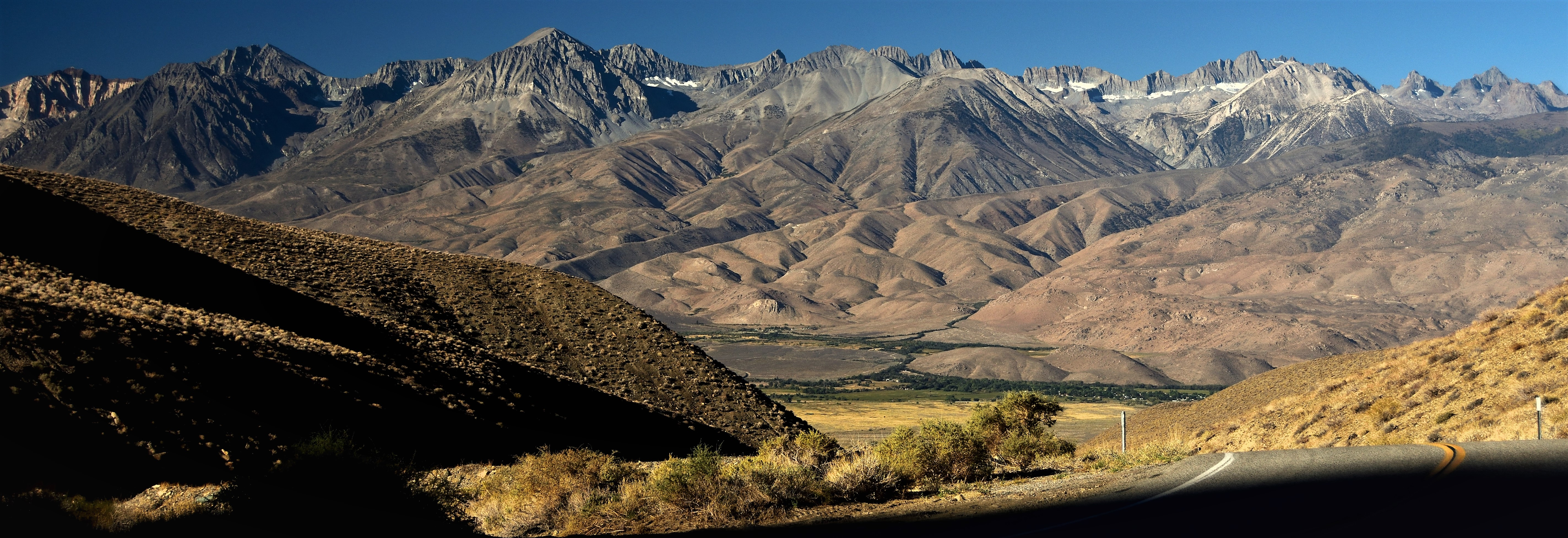
Eastern Sierra Nevada from Hwy 168 with The Thumb centered.

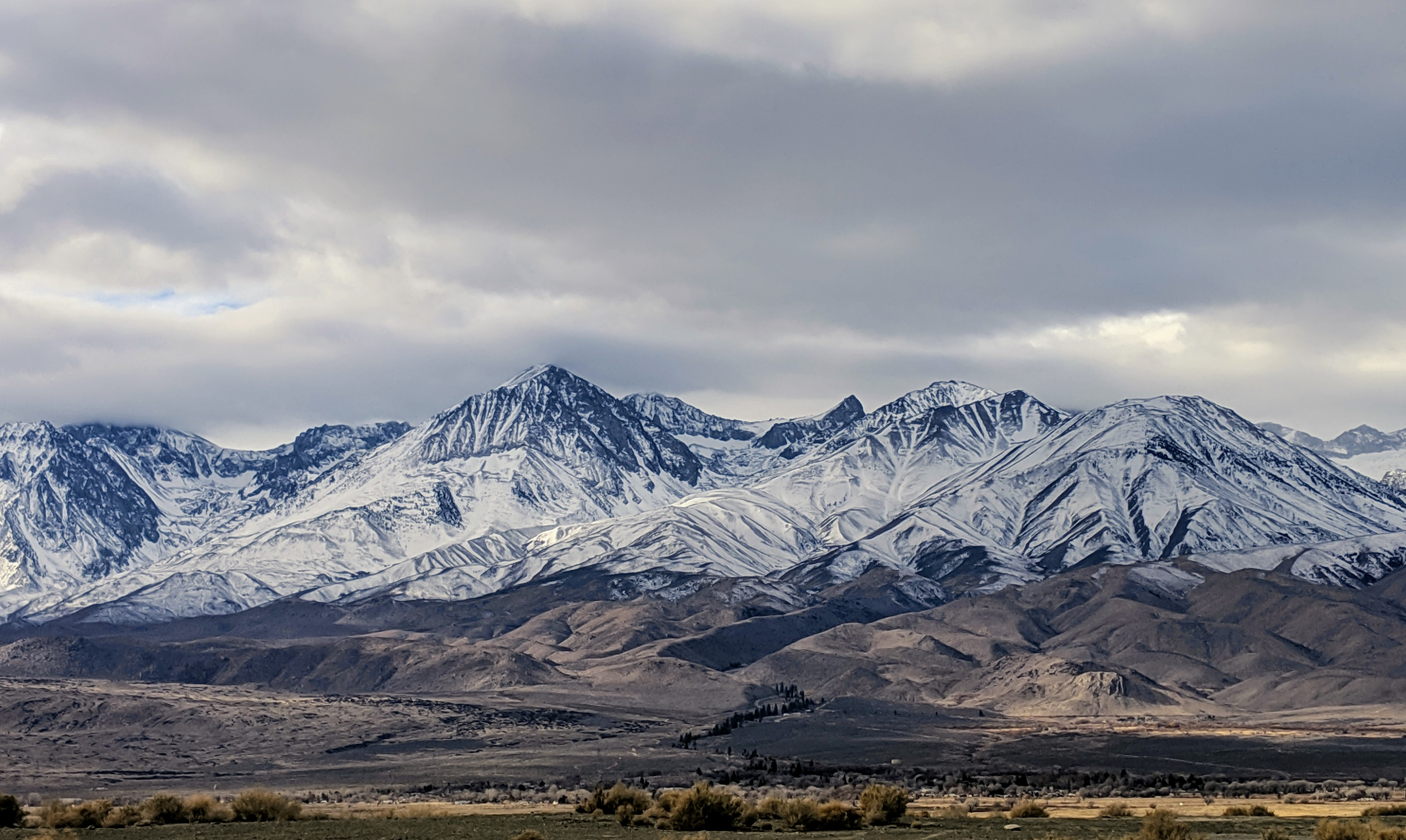
The Thumb visible to right of center

== See also ==
- List of the major 4000-meter summits of California
