= Mount Jepson =

Mountain in the state of California

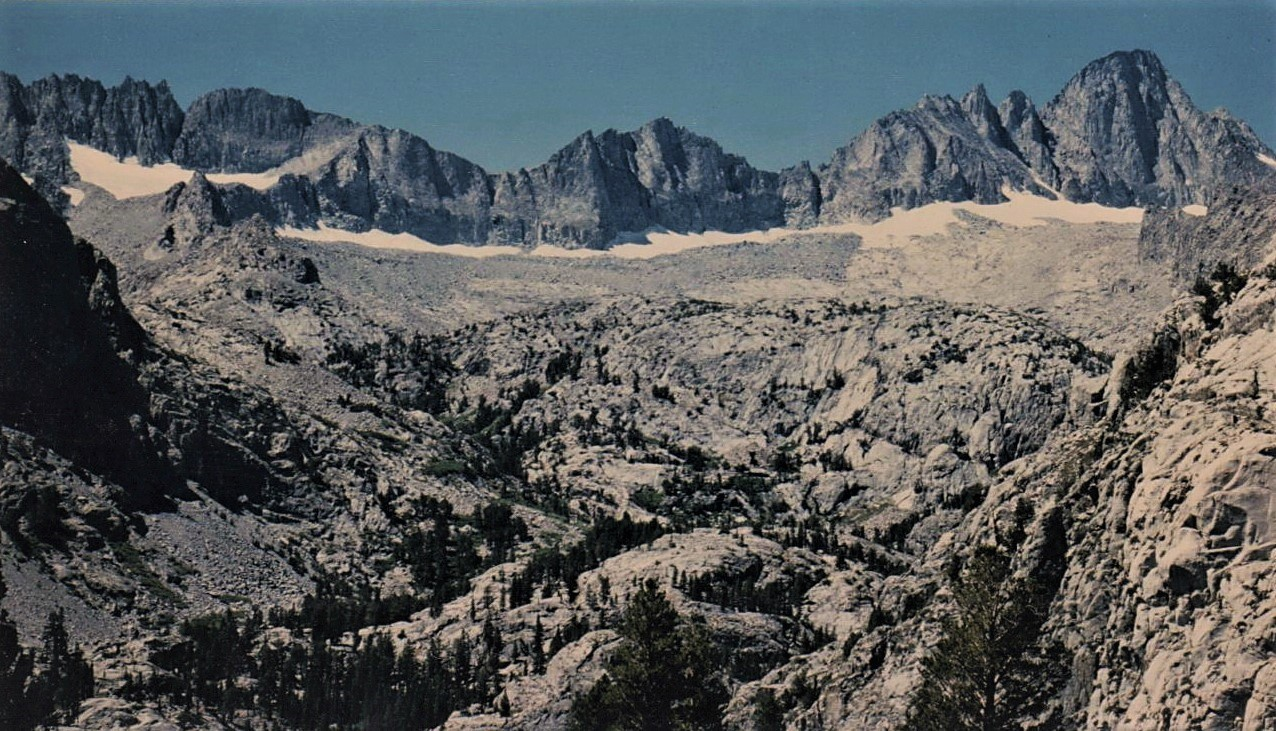
- Northeast aspect, centered at top

Highest point
- Elevation: 13,390 ft (4,081 m)
- Prominence: 334 ft (102 m)
- Parent peak: Mount Sill (14,159 ft)
- Isolation: 0.60 mi (0.97 km)
- Coordinates: 37°05′20″N 118°29′43″W

Naming
- Etymology: Willis Linn Jepson

Geography
- Location within California Location within the United States
- Location: Kings Canyon National Park; Fresno / Inyo Counties; California, U.S.
- Parent range: Sierra Nevada
- Topo map: USGS Split Mountain

Geology
- Rock age: Cretaceous
- Mountain type: Fault block
- Rock type: Granodiorite

Climbing
- First ascent: 1939
- Easiest route: class 2

Mount Jepson is a 13,390-foot (4,080-meter) summit in the Sierra Nevada of California located on the shared boundary of Fresno County and Inyo County in California, United States.

== Description ==
The peak is set on the crest of the Sierra Nevada mountain range in the Palisades area. It straddles the border shared by Kings Canyon National Park and John Muir Wilderness. It is situated 12 miles (19 km) southwest of Big Pine, 0.66 miles (1.06 km) southeast of line parent Mount Sill, and 0.6 miles (0.97 km) northwest of proximate parent Palisade Crest. Mount Jepson ranks as the 74th-highest peak in California, and topographic relief is significant as the summit rises 2,400 feet (730 meters) above Elinore Lake in approximately one mile. The John Muir Trail passes below the south base of the peak, providing an approach option.

== History ==
The first ascent of the summit was made July 3, 1939, by Don McGeein, and Chet and Evelyn Errett.

This mountain's toponym was officially adopted in 1971 by the United States Board on Geographic Names to honor Willis Linn Jepson (1867–1946), Professor of Botany, University of California at Berkeley, conservationist, writer, and charter member of the Sierra Club. Dr. Lawrence R. Heckard, president of the California Botanical Society, submitted the name to the board for consideration for permanent official status. "Pine Marten Peak" had been a variant name.

== Climate ==
Mount Jepson is located in an alpine climate zone. Most weather fronts originate in the Pacific Ocean, and travel east toward the Sierra Nevada mountains. As fronts approach, they are forced upward by the peaks (orographic lift), causing them to drop their moisture in the form of rain or snowfall onto the range. Precipitation runoff from this mountain drains northeast to South Fork Big Pine Creek, as well as south into Palisade Creek which is a tributary of the Middle Fork Kings River.

== Gallery ==
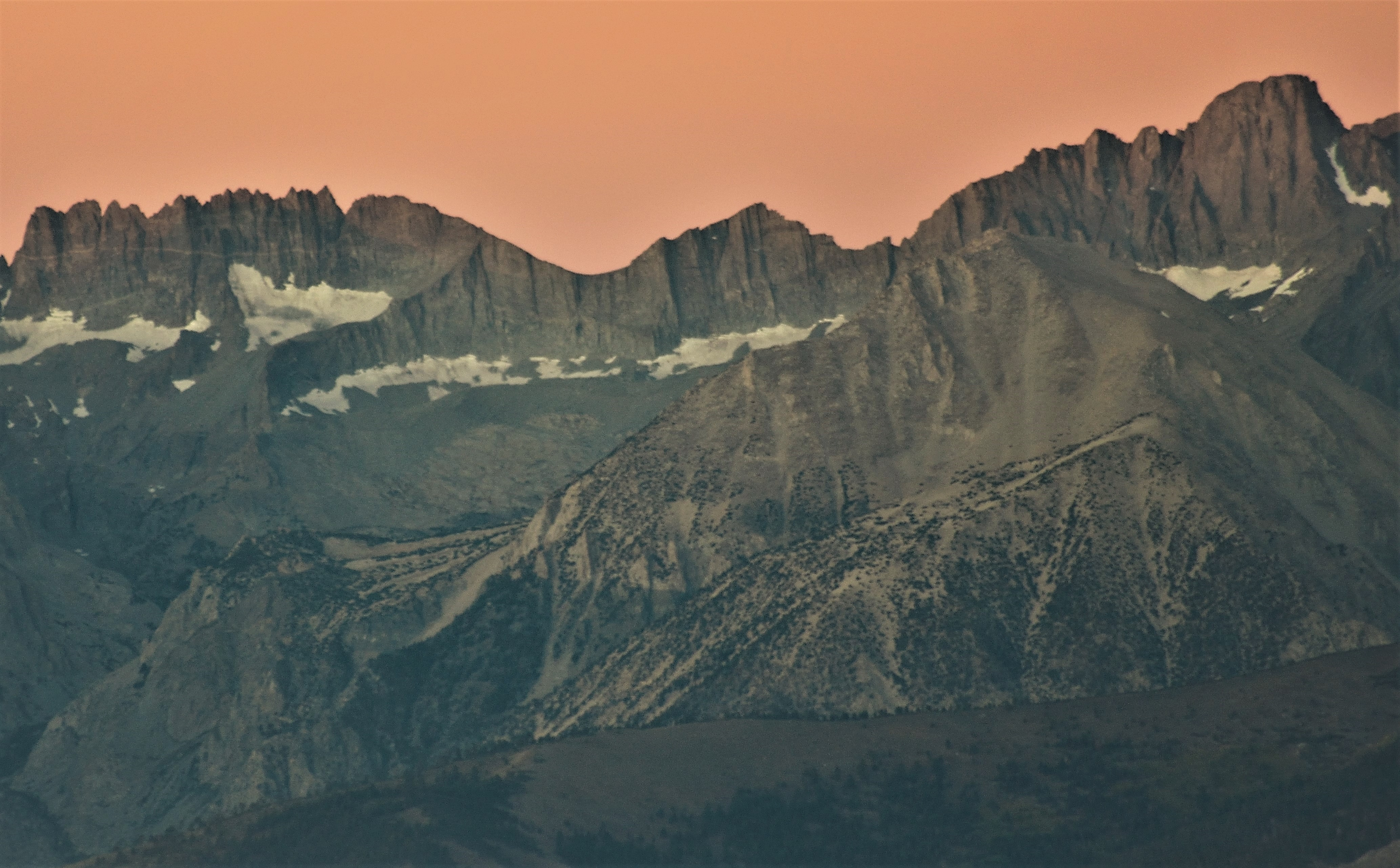
Palisade Crest (left), Mount Jepson (middle), Mount Sill (right) at dawn.

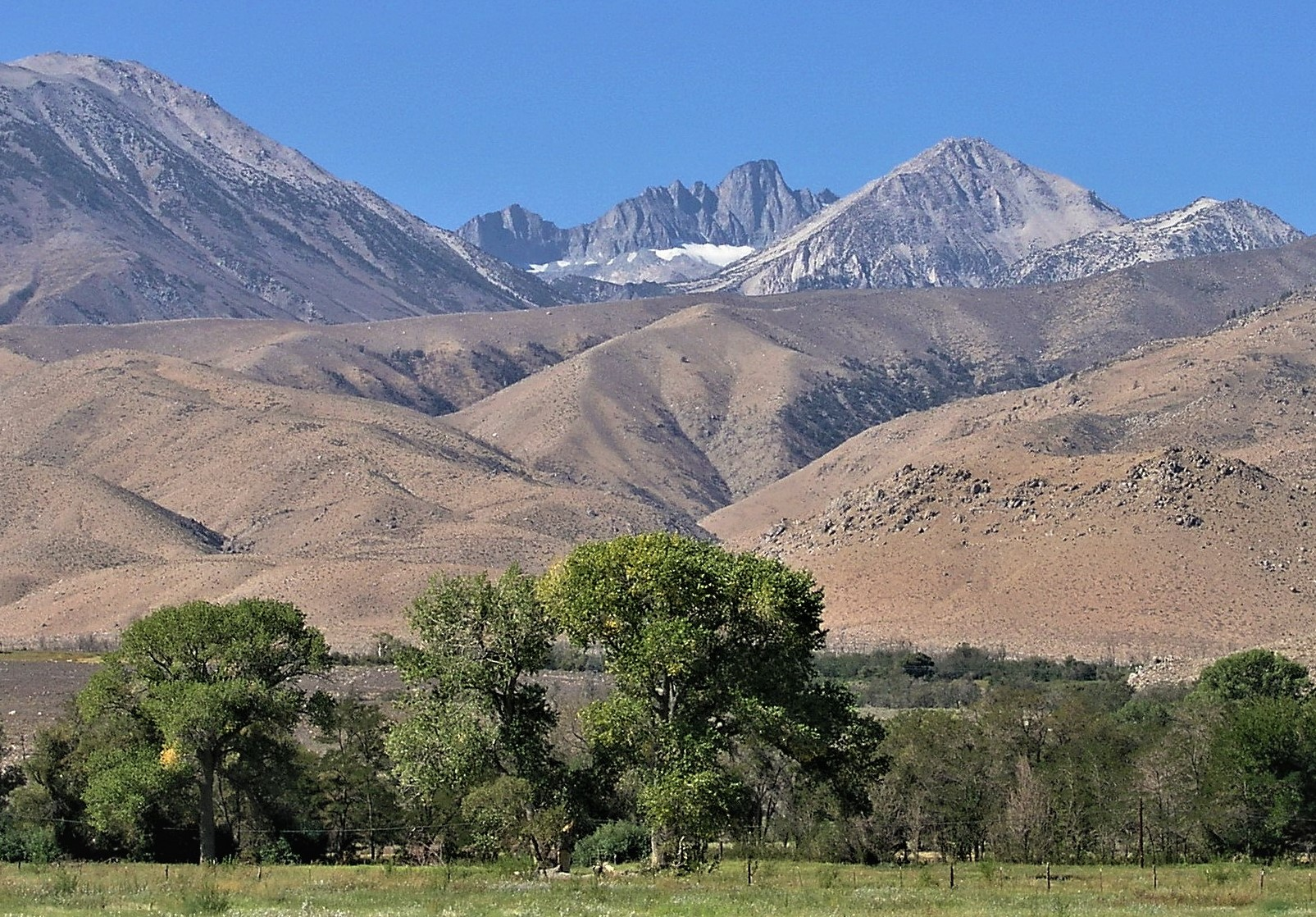
The view from Big Pine. Mount Jepson and Mount Sill centered in the distance with snow lingering below the summits.

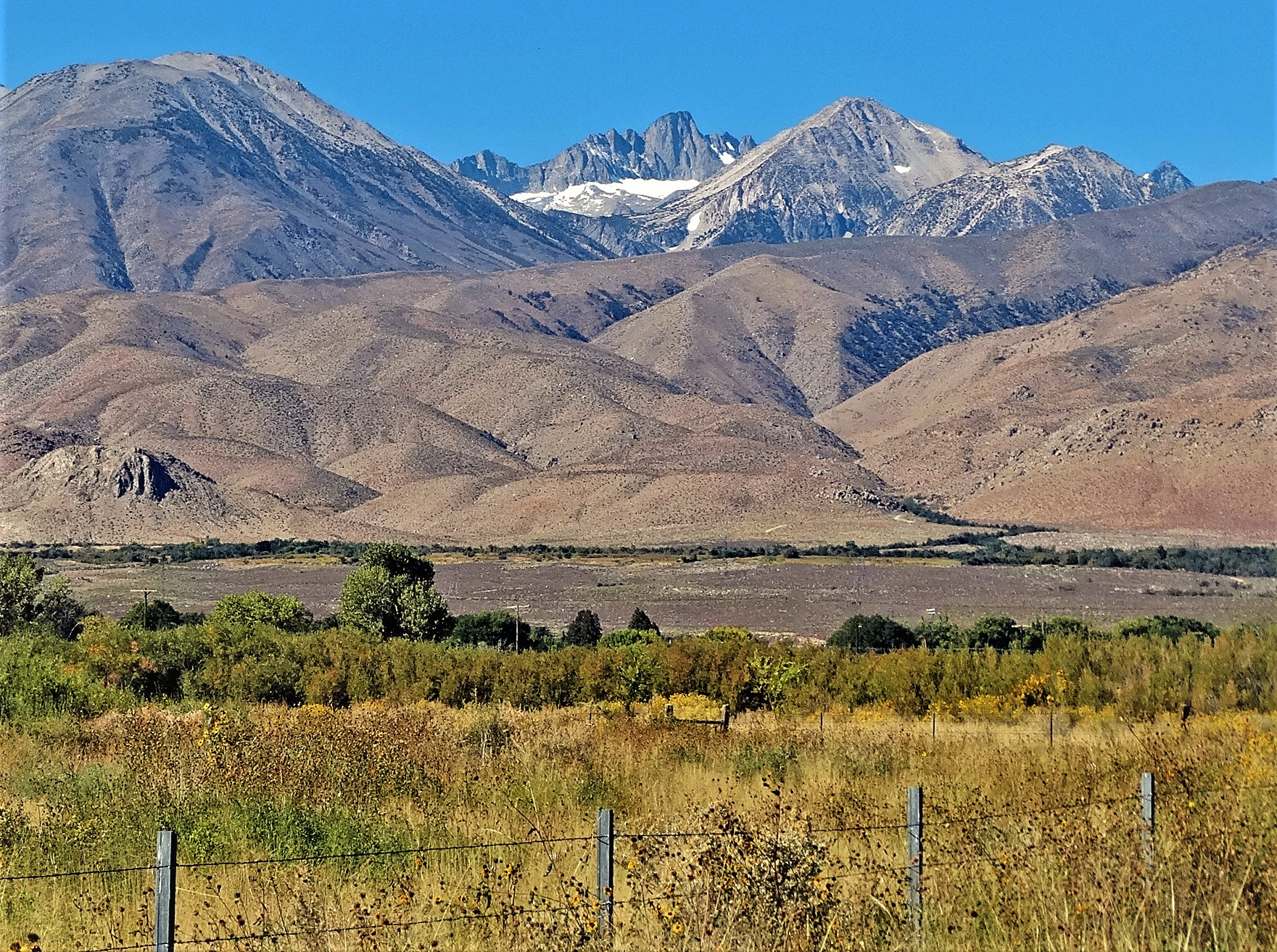
Mts. Jepson and Sill centered in the distance. From Owens Valley with camera pointed west-southwest.

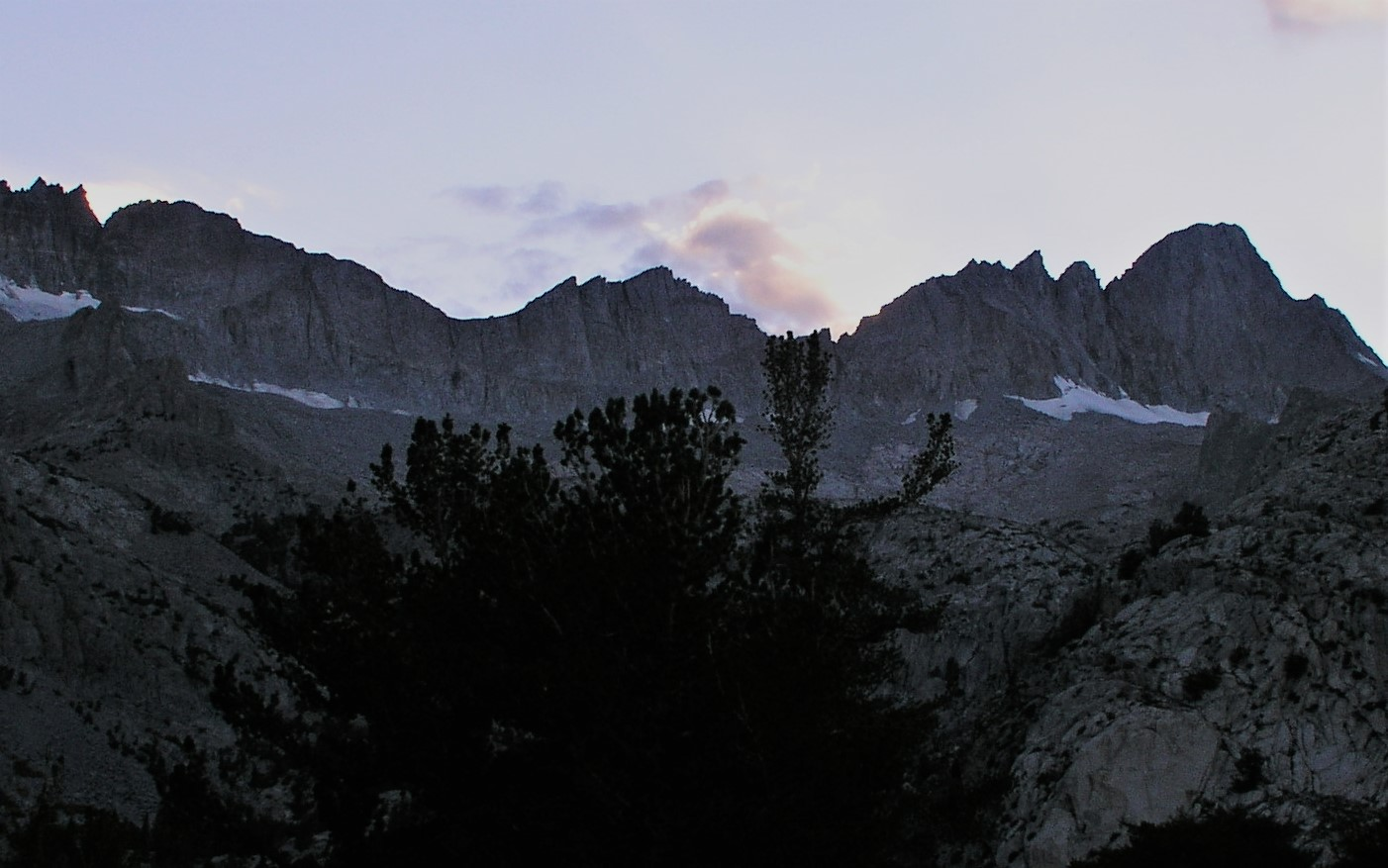
Mount Jepson centered, and Mt. Sill (right)

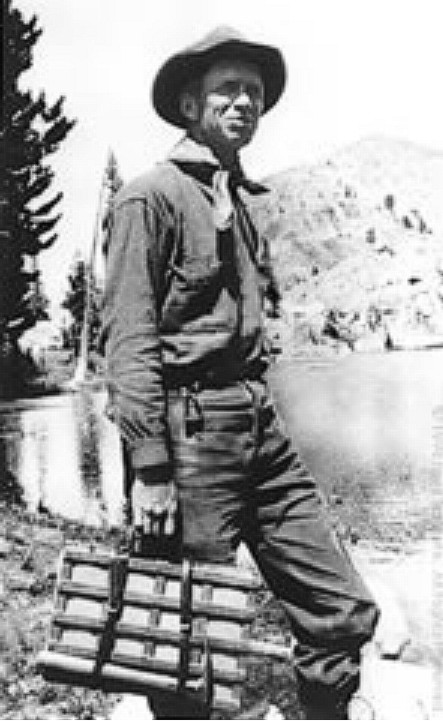
Willis Linn Jepson in 1911

== See also ==
- Sequoia-Kings Canyon Wilderness
- Thirteener
