= Norman Clyde Peak =

Mountain in the state of California

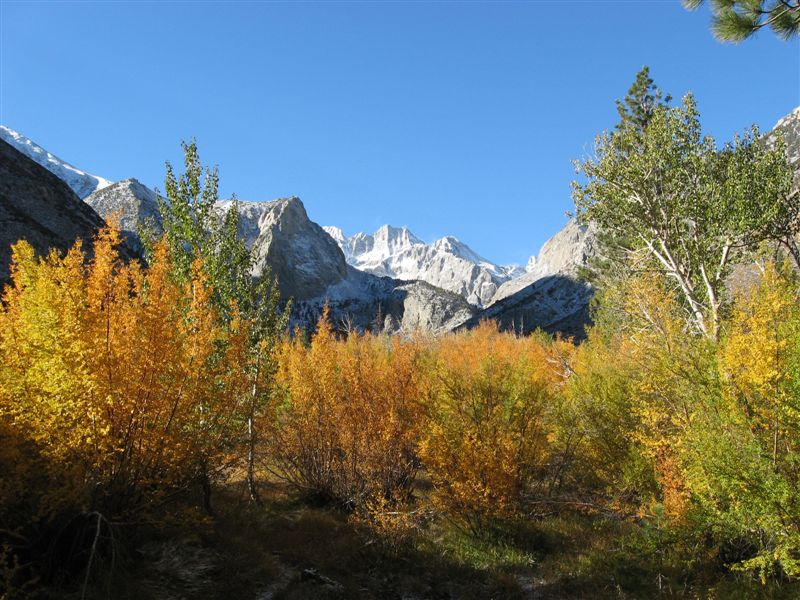
- Norman Clyde Peak from the northeast, seen over the autumn colors on Big Pine Creek near Glacier Lodge, October 2007.

Highest point
- Elevation: 13,970 ft (4,260 m) NAVD 88
- Prominence: 430 ft (130 m)
- Parent peak: Middle Palisade
- Listing: SPS Mountaineers peak; Western States Climbers Star peak
- Coordinates: 37°04′30″N 118°28′22″W

Geography
- Location within California Location within the United States
- Location: Fresno and Inyo counties, California, U.S.
- Parent range: Sierra Nevada
- Topo map: USGS Split Mountain

Climbing
- First ascent: 1930 by Norman Clyde
- Easiest route: Exposed climb, class 4

Norman Clyde Peak, standing 13,970 feet (4,258 m) tall, is in natural company among the high peaks of the Palisades region of the Sierra Nevada in California. It raises on the main ridge of the Palisades', between Middle Palisade and Palisade Crest. Norman Clyde Glacier on its north face, and Middle Palisade Glacier on its east both feed the headwaters of the South Fork of Big Pine Creek. It is named posthumously for mountaineer Norman Clyde, who first climbed it by way of the Norman Clyde Glacier in 1930.

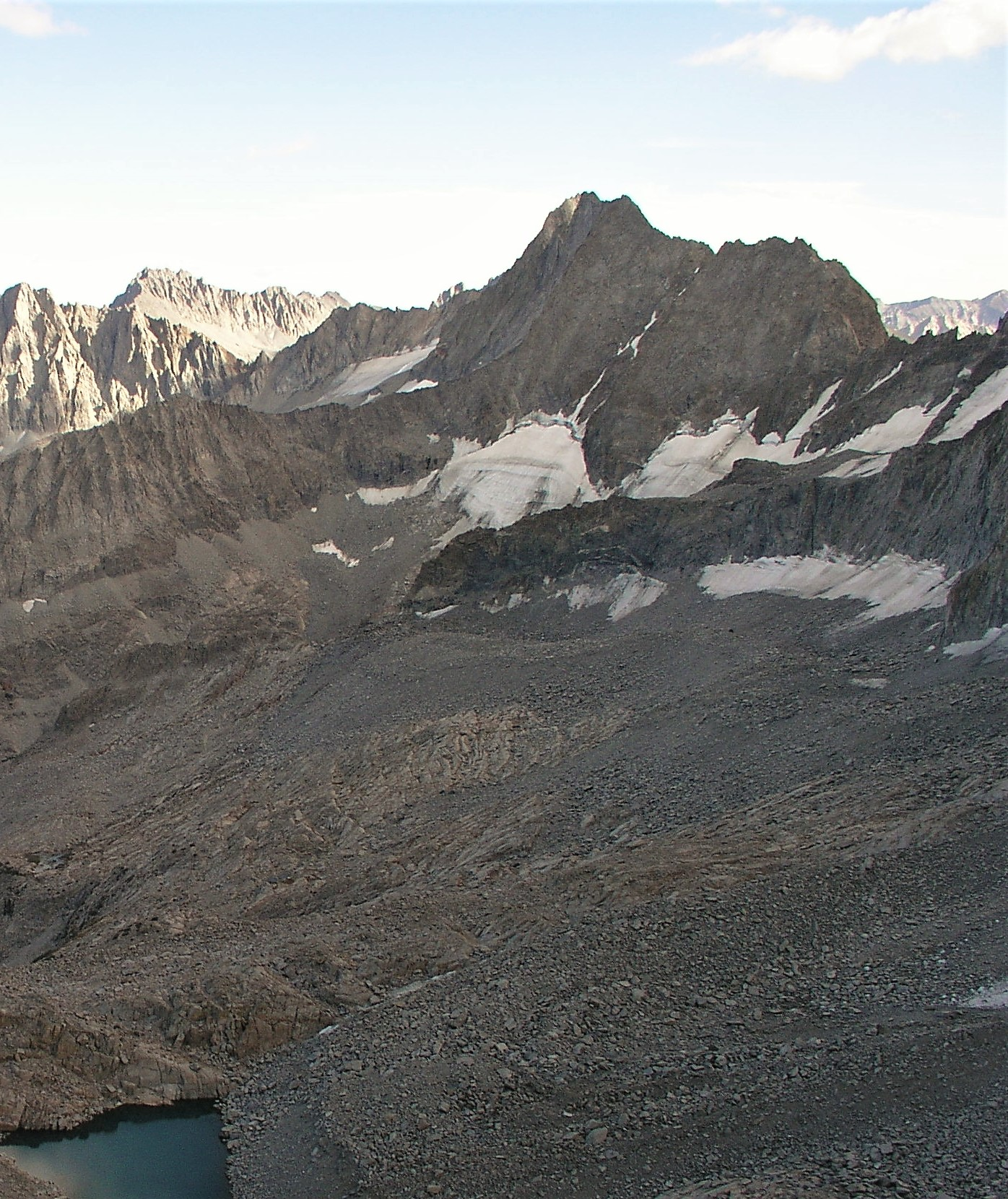
Northwest aspect seen from Mount Gayley

== See also ==
- Mountain peaks of California
- Palisades of the Sierra Nevada
