= Norman Clyde Glacier =

Glacier in California, United States

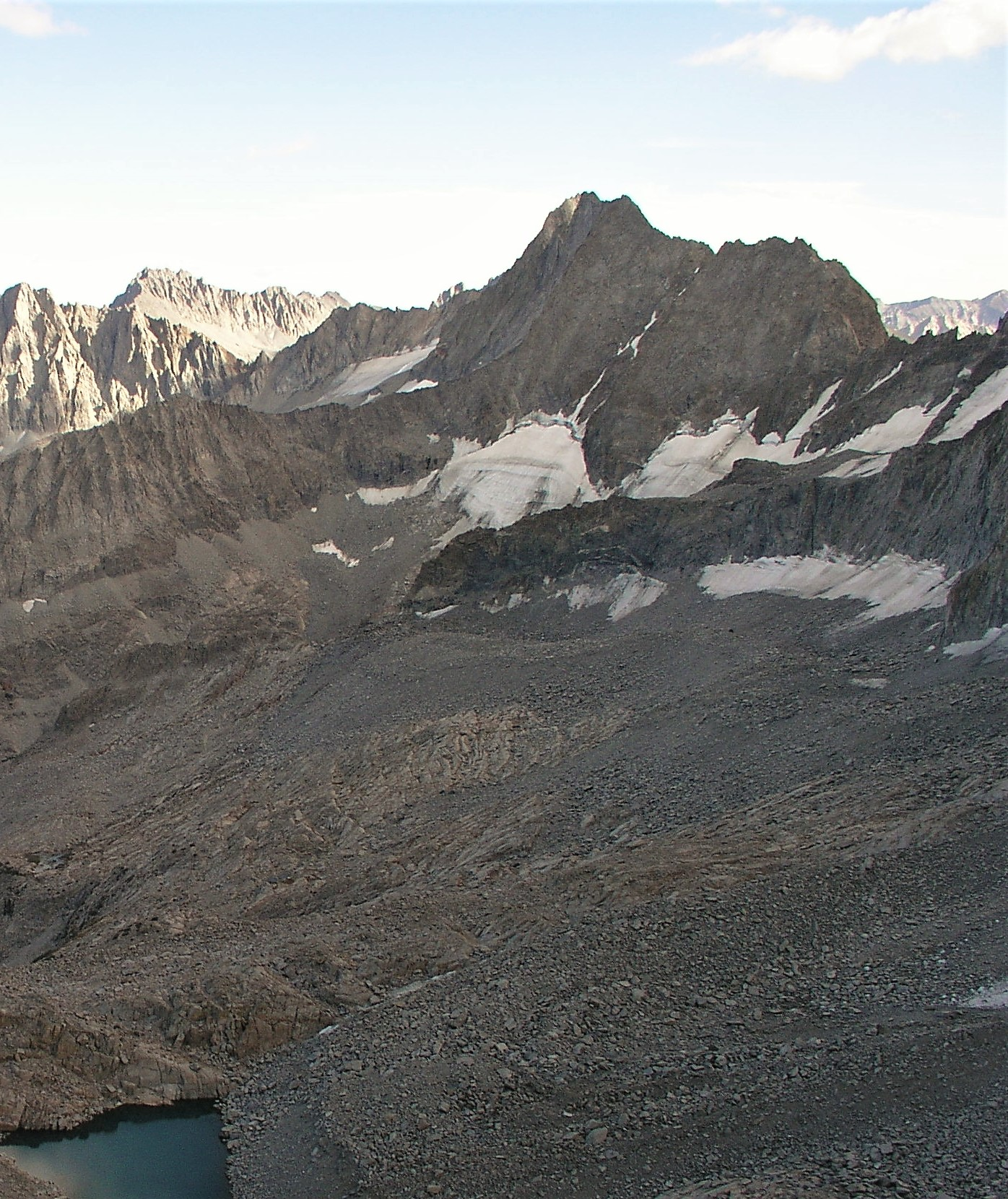
- Norman Clyde Glacier seen below Norman Clyde Peak, from Mount Gayley to the northwest

- Location within California
- Type: Mountain glacier
- Location: Norman Clyde Peak, Inyo County, California, U.S.
- Coordinates: 37°04′45″N 118°28′43″W
- Length: .25 mi (0.40 km)
- Terminus: Talus
- Status: Retreating

Norman Clyde Glacier is a small glacier located in the crest of the Sierra Nevada Range in the John Muir Wilderness of Inyo National Forest in Inyo County, California. The glacier is northwest of Norman Clyde Peak (13,861 ft (4,225 m) NAVD 88) and both are named after California mountaineer Norman Clyde. A small ridge separates the glacier from the adjacent but larger Middle Palisade Glacier located less than .25 mi (0.40 km) to the southeast.

== See also ==
- List of glaciers in the United States
