= Willis Linn Jepson =

American botanist (1867–1946)

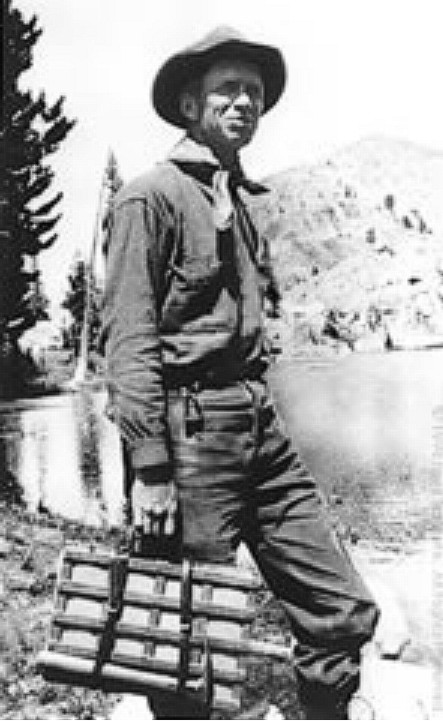
- Jepson in 1911
- Born: August 19, 1867; Vacaville, California, U.S.
- Died: November 7, 1946 (aged 79); Berkeley, California, U.S.
- Education: University of California, Berkeley
- Occupations: Botanist, conservationist
- Notable work: A Flora of California (1909)

Willis Linn Jepson (August 19, 1867 – November 7, 1946) was a late-19th and 20th century California botanist, professor, conservationist, and writer. A co-founder of the Sierra Club in 1892, he was much honored in later life for his research and impact on his fields.

== Career ==
Jepson was born at Little Oak Ranch near Vacaville, California. He became interested in botany as a boy and explored the adjacent San Francisco Bay Area, coming into contact with various botanists before he entered college.

In 1892, at the age of 25, Jepson, John Muir, and Warren Olney formed the Sierra Club, in Olney's San Francisco law office. From 1895 to 1898, Jepson served as instructor in Botany and carried on research at the University of California, Berkeley, Cornell University (1895), and Harvard University (1896–1897). He received his Ph.D. at Berkeley in 1899. He also created the botanical journal Erythea, of which he was the editor from 1893 to 1922.

He was made assistant professor in 1899, associate professor in 1911, professor in 1918, and professor emeritus in 1937. He was a professor of botany at UC Berkeley for four decades, thus his entire career was identified with the University of California. Jepson founded the California Botanical Society and served as its president from 1913 to 1915; he also worked as councilor of the Rancho Santa Ana Botanic Garden.

== Legacy ==
Many honors and commemorations came to Jepson during his lifetime and as well as posthumously:

- He was granted a fellowship to the California Academy of Sciences, American Academy of Arts and Sciences, and American Geographical Society
- Member of the American Genetic Association, American Society of Plant Taxonomists, Botanical Society of America, Society of American Foresters, Washington Academy of Sciences, Western Society of Naturalists, Phi Beta Kappa, and Sigma Xi
- Foreign member of the Royal Society of Arts, Société linnéenne de Lyon, and Czechoslovak Botanical Society
- Colleagues at UC Berkeley honored him with the Faculty Research Lectureship in 1934
- The Saxifragaceae genus Jepsonia and its species are named after him
- The Jepson Herbarium at UC Berkeley is named for him
- The Jepson Manual, a flora of the vascular plants of California, is named in his honor
- California's Jepson Peak, Mount Jepson, and Jepson Prairie are named after him
- The oldest known living laurel tree in California is named after him.

=== Publications ===
Jepson wrote at least 11 books during his lifetime, with two focused on California's trees. His works include A Flora of California (1909), The Trees of California (1909); and the major A Manual of the Flowering Plants of California (1925), predecessor of The Jepson Manual (1993).

- A Flora of California – Volume I. San Francisco: Cunningham, Curtiss & Welch. 1909a. OCLC 755039635.
- A Flora of California – Volume II. San Francisco: Cunningham, Curtiss & Welch. 1909b. OCLC 755039635.
