= Palisade Crest =

Mountain in the American state of California

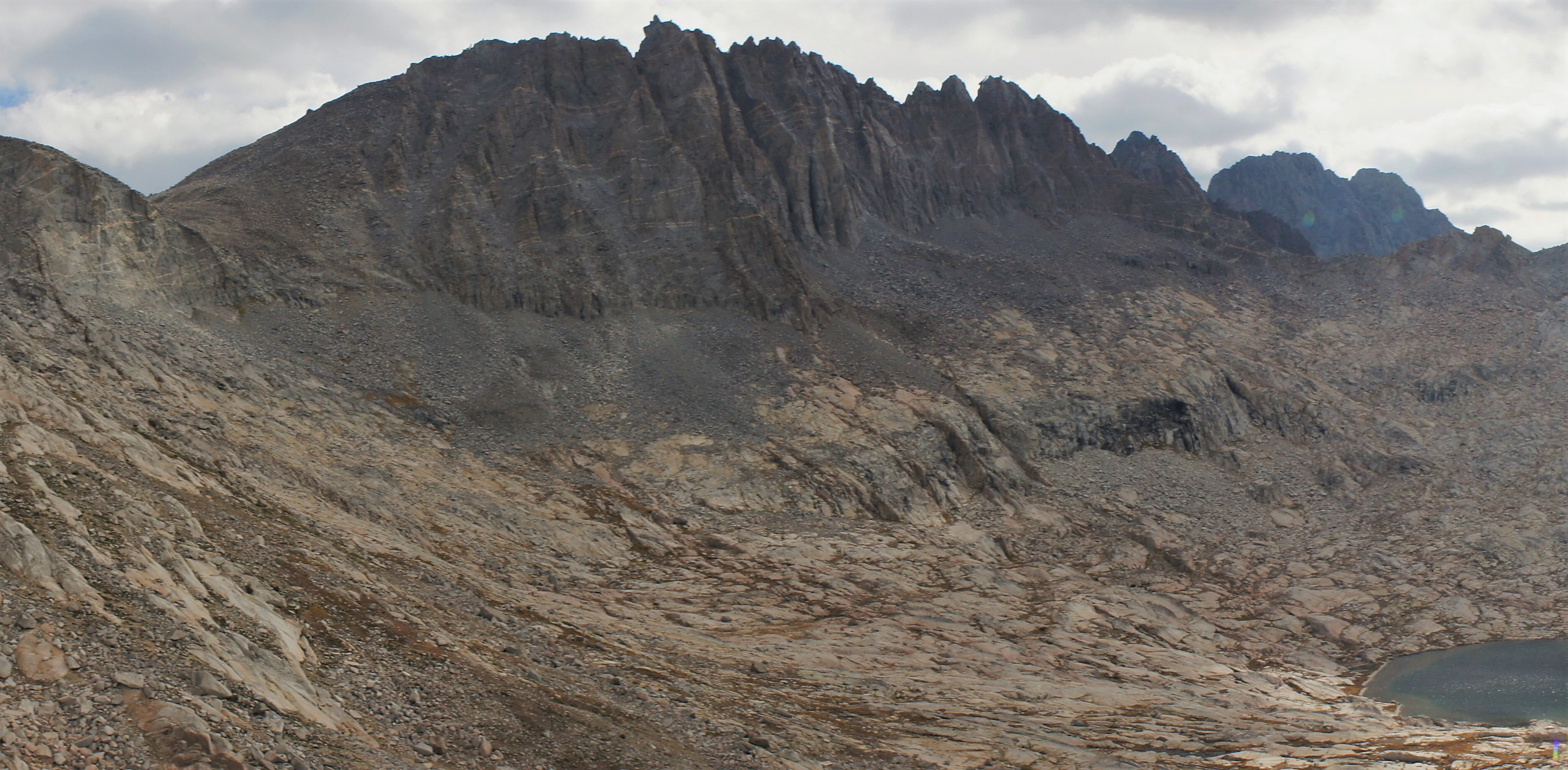
- West aspect, from Potluck Pass

Highest point
- Elevation: 13,559 ft (4,133 m) NAVD 88
- Prominence: 561 ft (171 m)
- Parent peak: North Palisade
- Listing: Sierra Peaks Section; Vagmarken Club Sierra Crest List
- Coordinates: 37°04′53″N 118°29′22″W

Geography
- Location within California
- Location: Kings Canyon National Park; John Muir Wilderness Area; Fresno / Inyo counties, California, U.S.
- Parent range: Sierra Nevada
- Topo map: USGS Split Mountain

Climbing
- First ascent: 1969 by Don Jensen, Joan Jensen and Rex Post
- Easiest route: Northwest ridge (rock climb, class 4)

Palisade Crest is a jagged ridge in the Palisades region of the Sierra Nevada mountain rage in the United States, southeast of Mount Sill and northwest of Middle Palisade. Its twelve pinnacles are unofficially named for characters from The Lord of the Rings by J. R. R. Tolkien. The highest pinnacle, at 13,559 feet (4,133 m), is called Gandalf Peak.

The ridge marks the boundary between Kings Canyon National Park and the John Muir Wilderness.

== Climate ==
According to the Köppen climate classification system, Palisade Crest is located in an alpine climate zone. Most weather fronts originate in the Pacific Ocean, and travel east toward the Sierra Nevada mountains. As fronts approach, they are forced upward by the peaks (orographic lift), causing them to drop their moisture in the form of rain or snowfall onto the range.

== Gallery ==
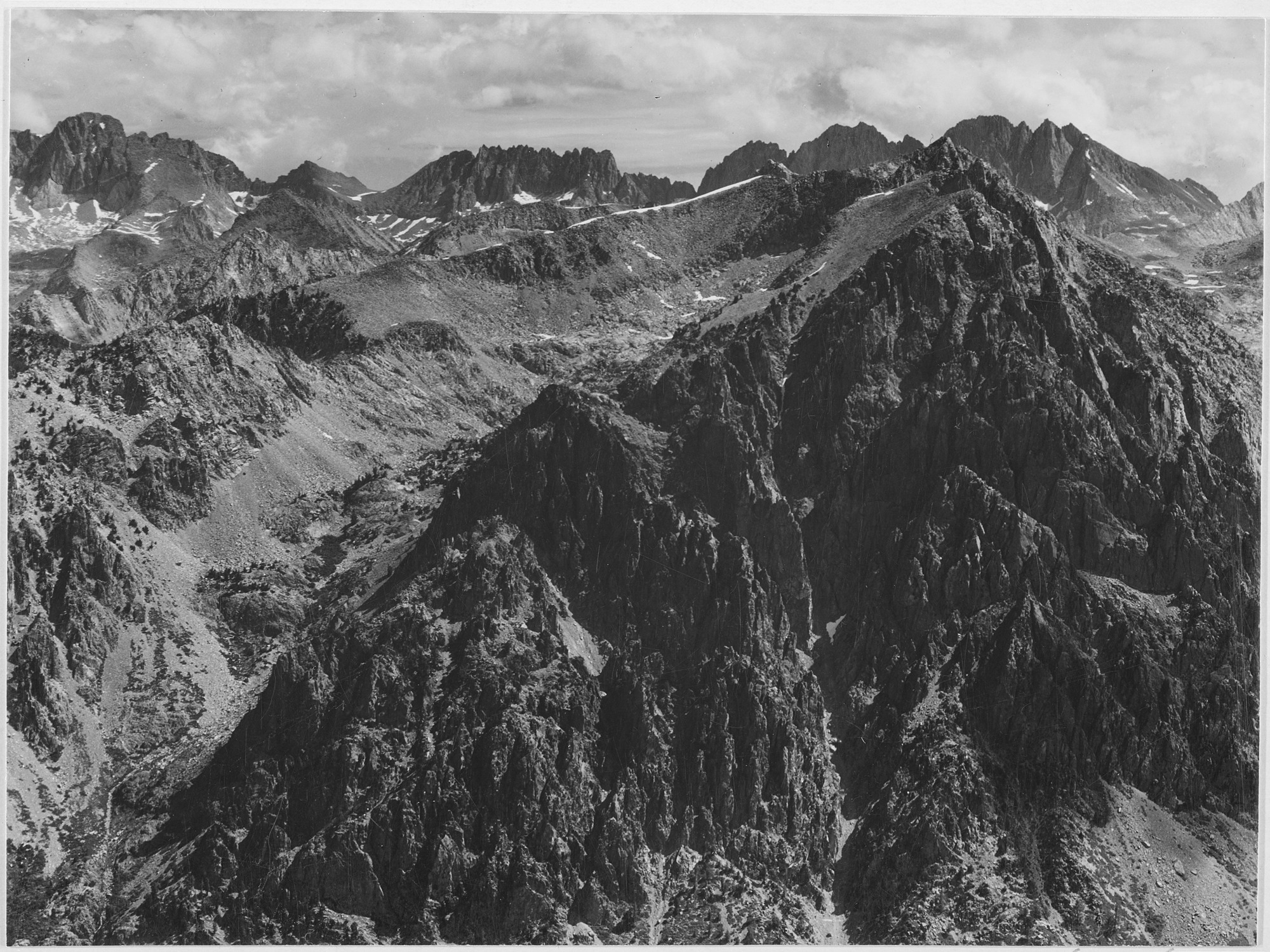
Southwest aspect of Palisade Crest centered at top
Photo by Ansel Adams circa 1936
(Mt. Sill upper left, Middle Palisade upper right)

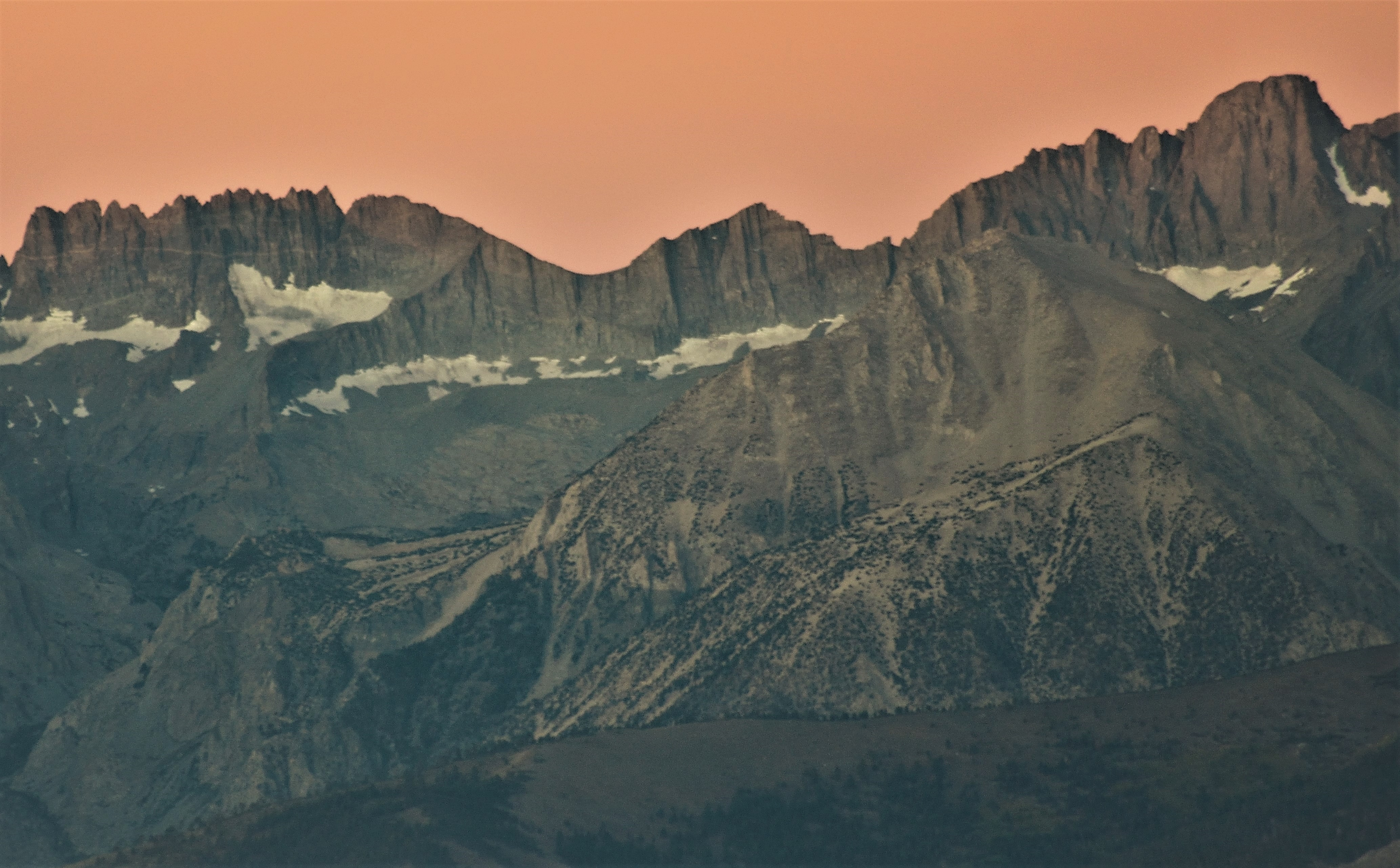
Palisade Crest (left), Mount Jepson (middle), Mount Sill (right).

== See also ==
- Palisades of the Sierra Nevada
