= Middle Palisade Glacier =

Glacier in California, United States

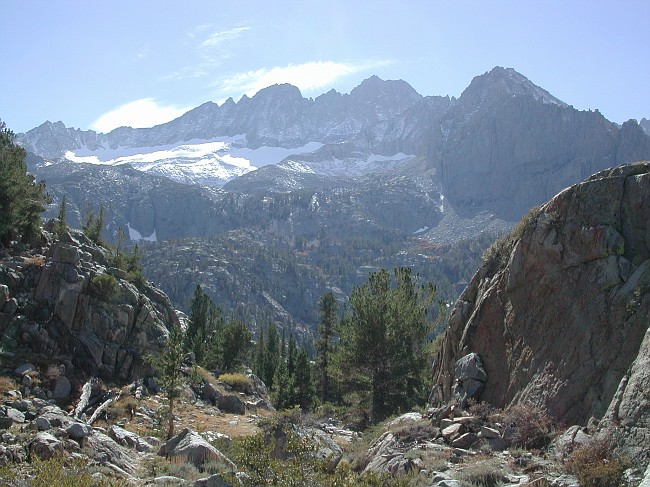
- Middle Palisade Glacier at upper left of image below Middle Palisade

- Location within California
- Type: Mountain glacier
- Location: Inyo National Forest, Inyo County, California, U.S.
- Coordinates: 37°04′16″N 118°27′52″W
- Length: .20 mi (0.32 km)
- Terminus: Talus
- Status: Retreating

Middle Palisade Glacier consists of two glaciers in the Sierra Nevada mountains, in the U.S. state of California. Less than .25-mile (0.40 km) southeast of Norman Clyde Glacier and situated at an altitude of 12,700 feet (3,900 m), Middle Palisade Glacier is in the John Muir Wilderness of Inyo National Forest. 14,012-foot (4,271 m) Middle Palisade and Disappointment Peak are immediately west of the glacier.

== See also ==
- List of glaciers in the United States
