= Mount Gayley =

Mountain in the Sierra Nevada mountain range

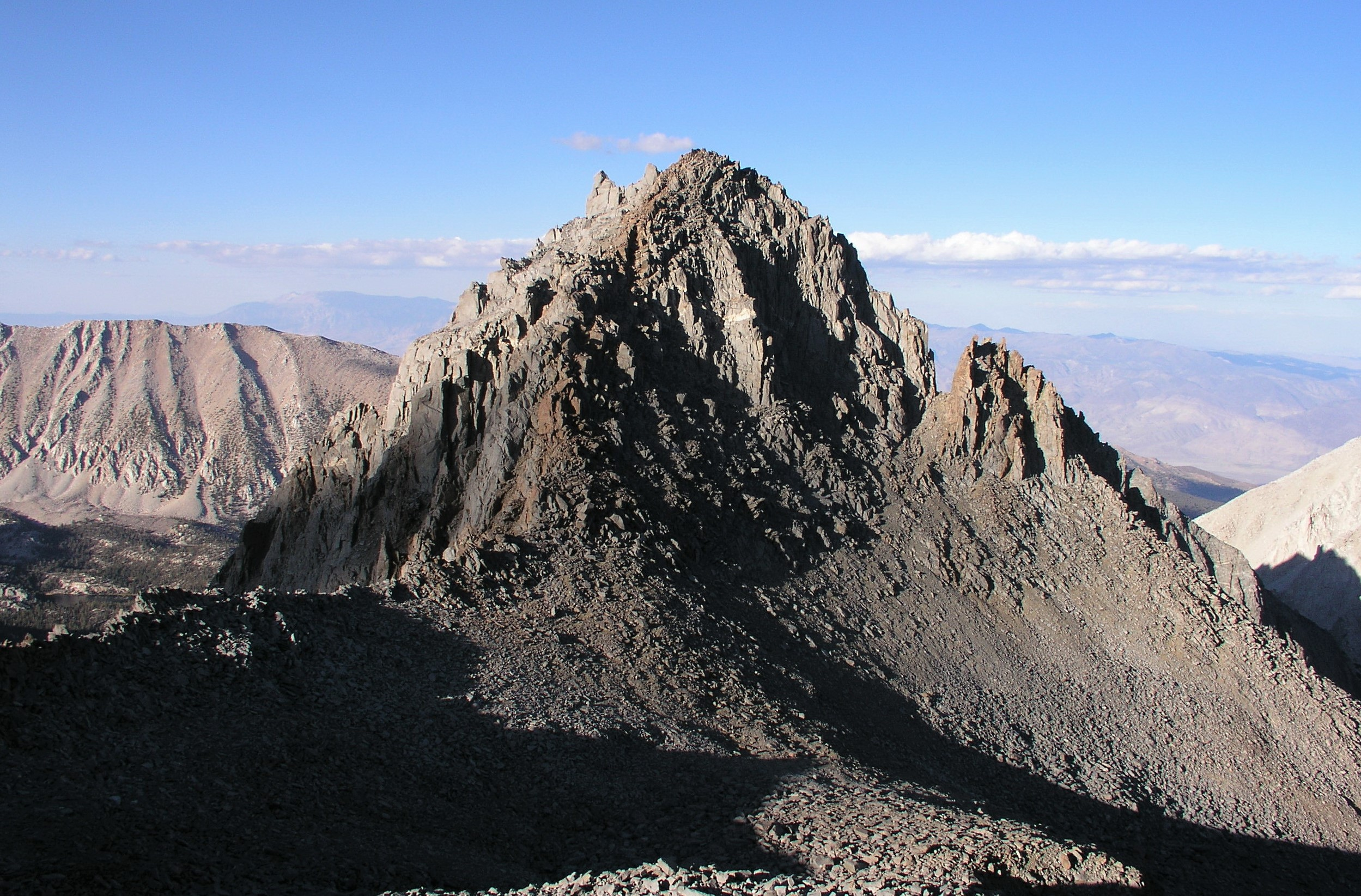
- Southwest aspect

Highest point
- Elevation: 13,516 ft (4,120 m)
- Prominence: 430 ft (130 m)
- Parent peak: Mount Sill
- Coordinates: 37°06′11″N 118°29′59″W

Naming
- Etymology: Charles Mills Gayley

Geography
- Location within California Location within the United States
- Country: United States
- State: California
- County: Inyo
- Protected area: John Muir Wilderness
- Parent range: Sierra Nevada
- Topo map: USGS Split Mountain

Climbing
- First ascent: 1927 by Norman Clyde
- Easiest route: Exposed scramble, class 3

Mount Gayley is a 13,510-foot-elevation (4,120-meter) mountain summit located one mile east of the crest of the Sierra Nevada mountain range in Inyo County, California, United States. It is situated in the Palisades area of the John Muir Wilderness, on land managed by Inyo National Forest. It is approximately 13 miles (21 km) west-southwest of the community of Big Pine, 0.67 miles (1.08 km) southwest of Temple Crag, and 0.5 miles (0.80 km) north-northeast of parent Mount Sill. Mount Gayley ranks as the 59th highest summit in California.

== History ==
The name commemorates Charles Mills Gayley (1858–1932), beloved English professor and Academic Dean of the University of California, Berkeley. This mountain's name was officially adopted prior to 1939 by the U.S. Board on Geographic Names based on a recommendation by the Sierra Club. Mount Sill and nearby Mount Jepson were also named for University of California professors. The first ascent of the summit was made June 10, 1927, by Norman Clyde, who is credited with 130 first ascents, most of which were in the Sierra Nevada.

== Climbing ==
Established climbing routes on Mount Gayley:

- Southwest Ridge (aka Yellow Brick Road) – class 3 – First ascent 1927
- South Face – class 3 – Several possible routes
- West Face – class 3 – FA June 1950 by Robert Cogburn and Ed Robbins

Access from Big Pine: Glacier Lodge Road, North Fork Big Pine Creek Trail, then Glacier Trail.

== Climate ==
According to the Köppen climate classification system, Mount Gayley is located in an alpine climate zone. Most weather fronts originate in the Pacific Ocean, and travel east toward the Sierra Nevada mountains. As fronts approach, they are forced upward by the peaks, causing them to drop their moisture in the form of rain or snowfall onto the range (orographic lift). This climate supports the Palisade Glacier below the west slope. Precipitation runoff from this mountain drains into Big Pine Creek.

== Gallery ==
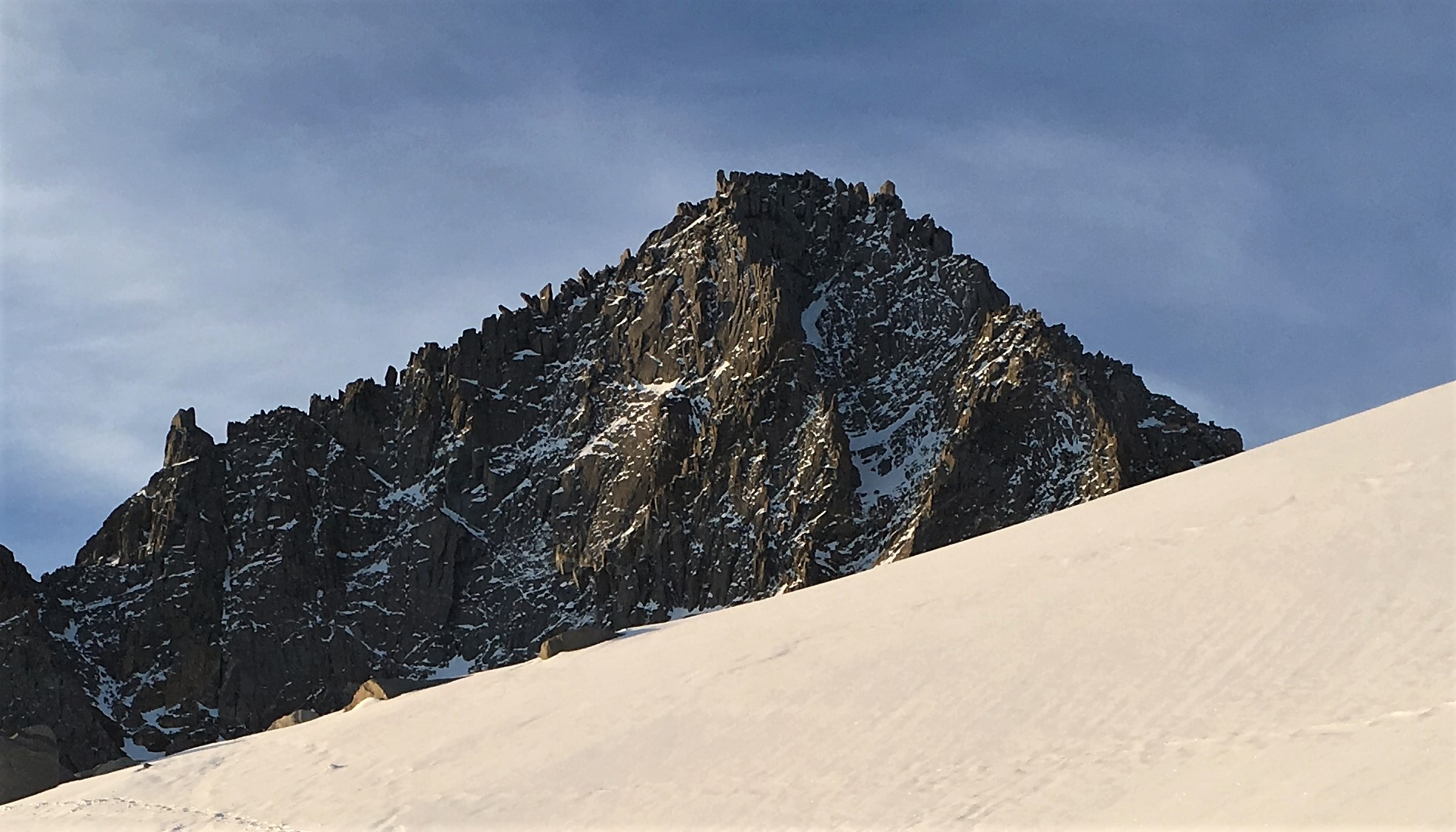
Mt. Gayley from the west

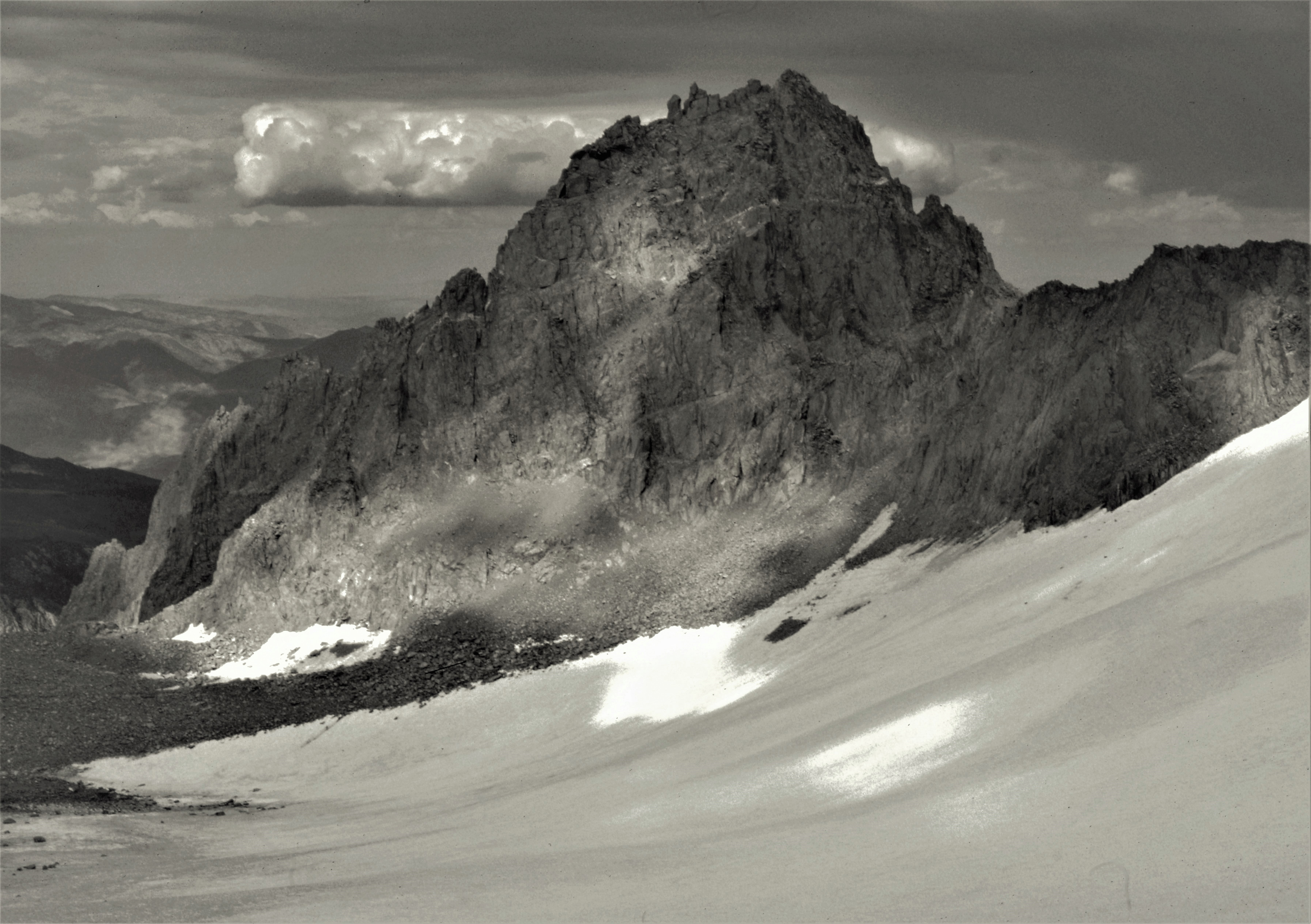
In 1984, with Palisade Glacier

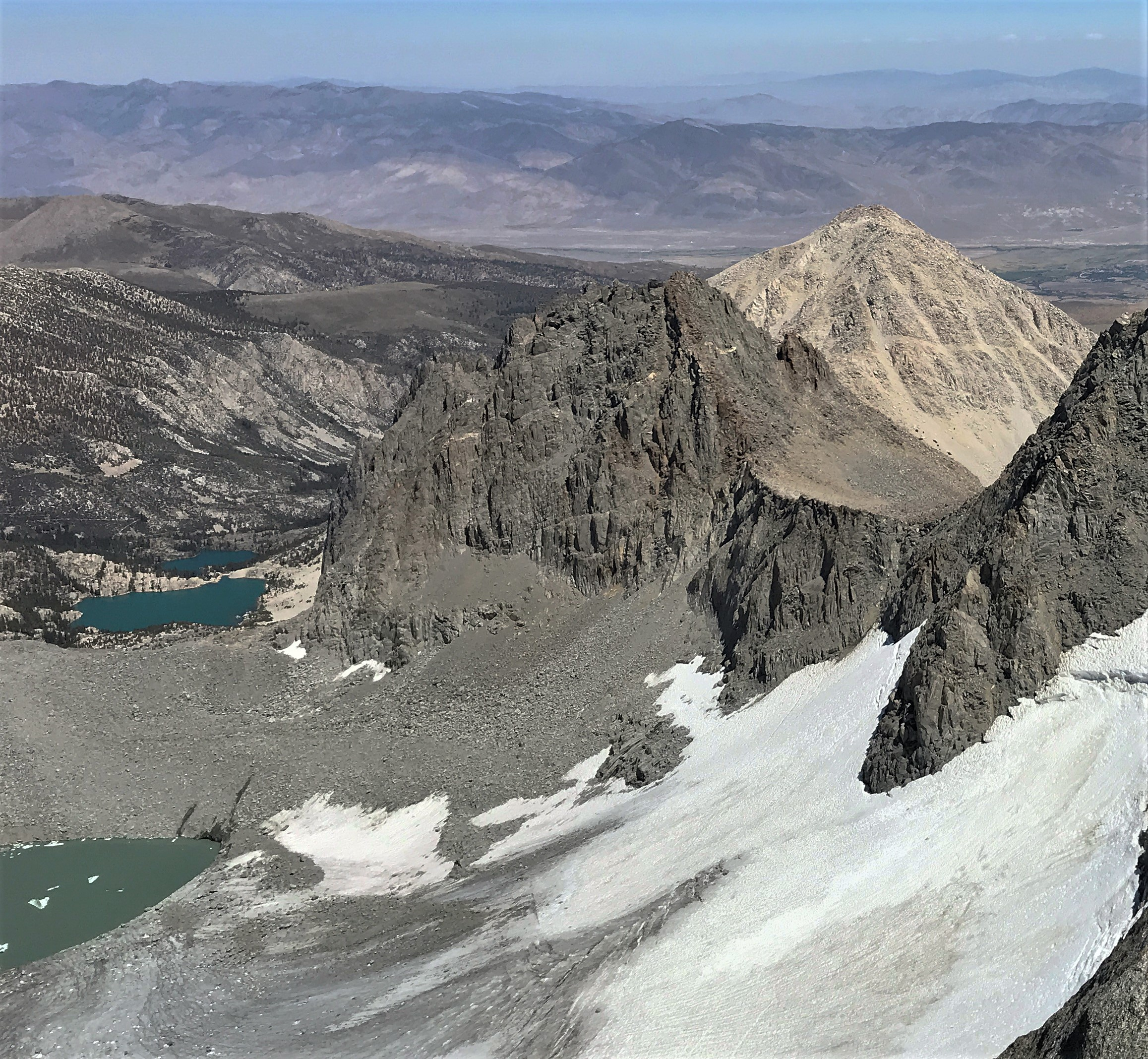
Mt. Gayley (centered) above Palisade Glacier as seen from North Palisade.
"Buck Mountain" (aka Contact Peak) beyond Gayley.

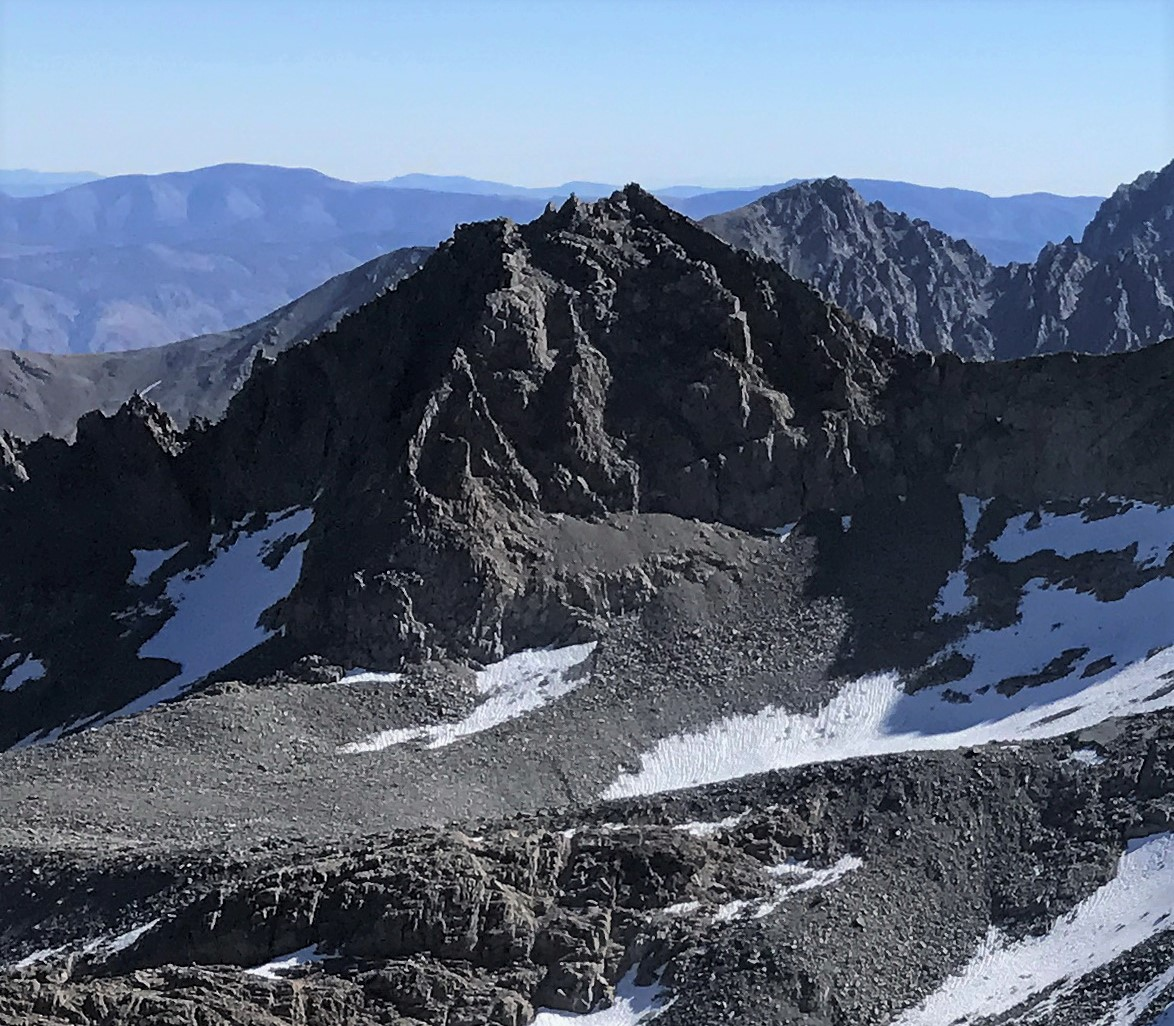
Mt. Gayley from the west

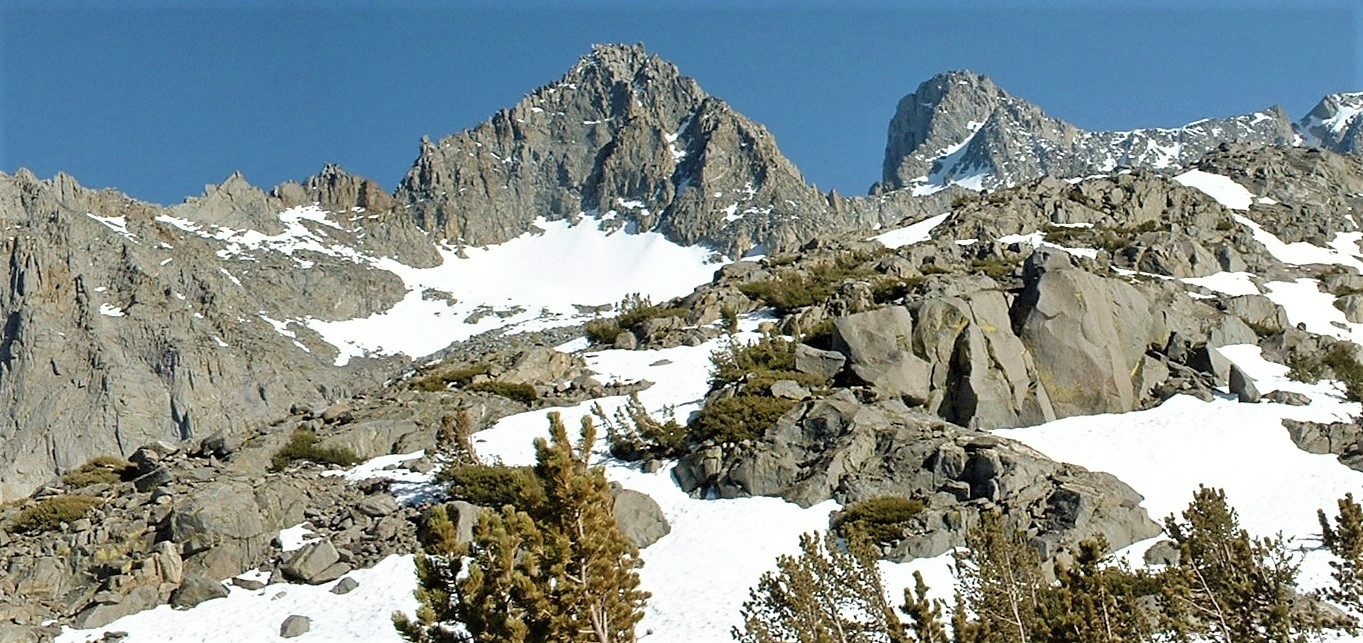
Gayley from the north. (Mt. Sill to right)

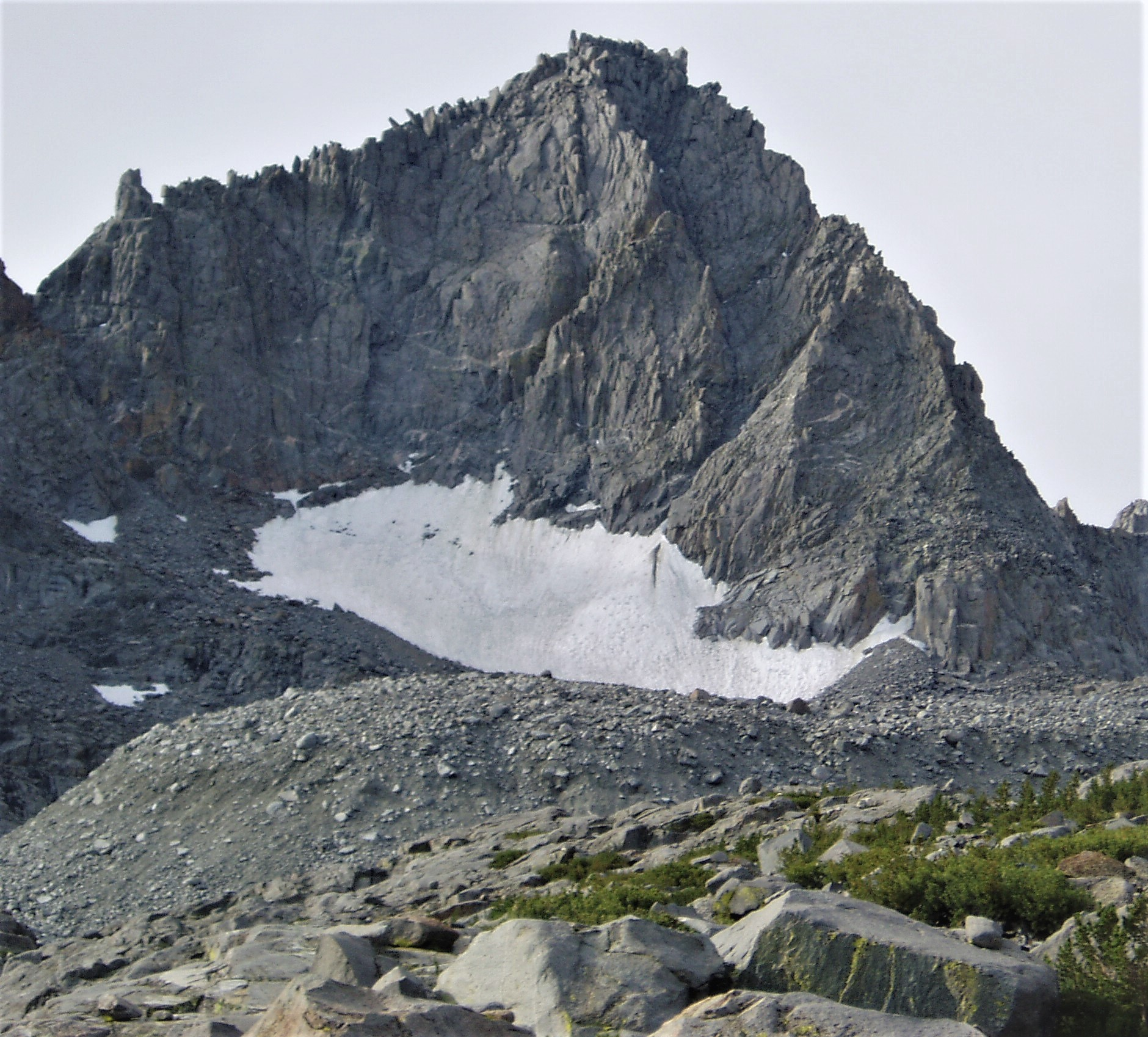

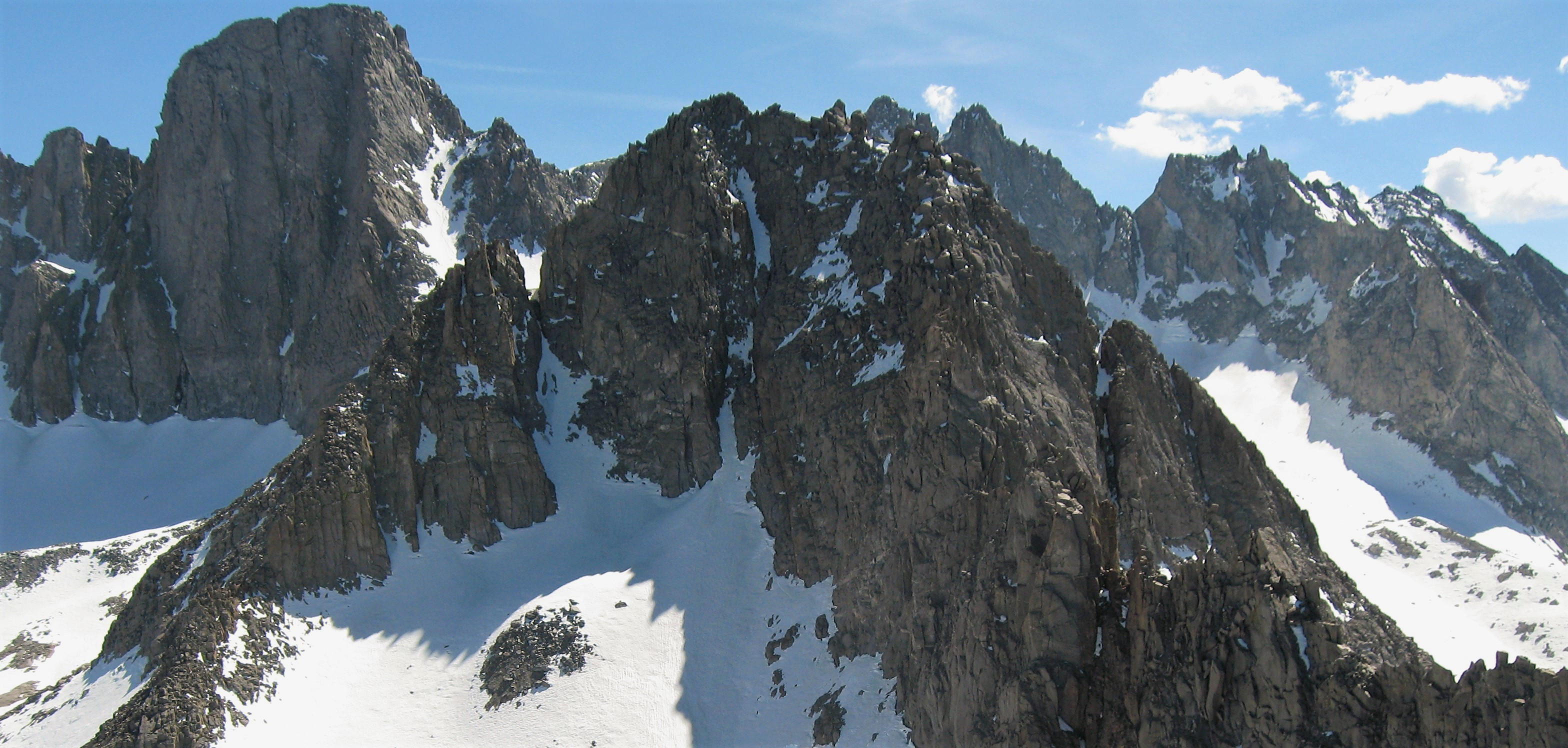
Mount Gayley (centered) seen from Temple Crag, with Mt. Sill behind (left).

== See also ==
- List of the major 4000-meter summits of California
