= Birch Mountain =

Mountain in Sierra Nevada range, California, United States

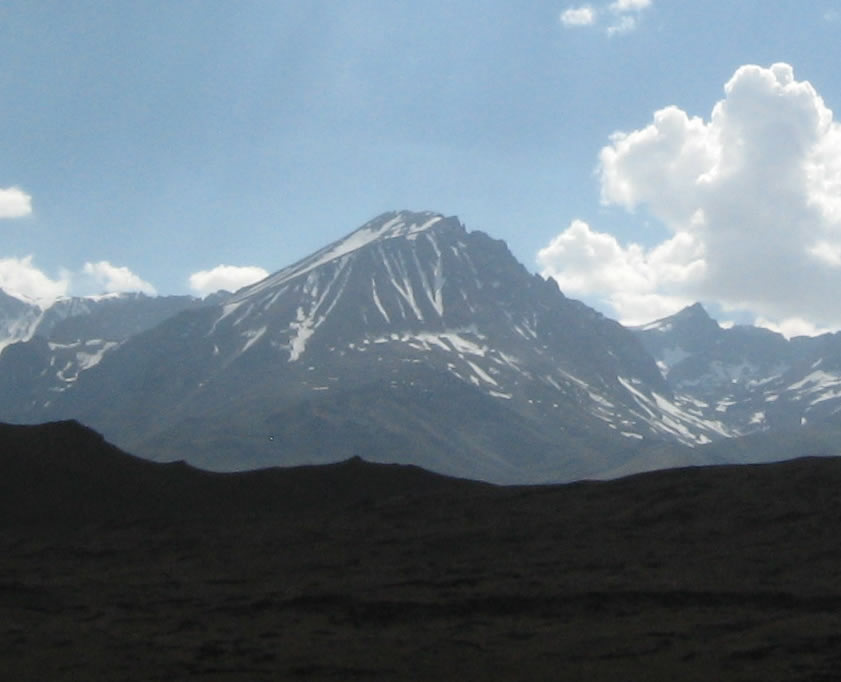
- Birch Mountain's east side from route 395, May 2009.

Highest point
- Elevation: 13,608 ft (4,148 m) NAVD 88
- Prominence: 938 ft (286 m)
- Listing: Sierra Peaks Section; Western States Climbers Emblem peak
- Coordinates: 37°03′46″N 118°25′07″W

Geography
- Location within California Location within the United States
- Location: Inyo County, California, U.S.
- Parent range: Sierra Nevada
- Topo map: USGS Split Mountain

Climbing
- First ascent: 1887 by J.W. Bledsoe
- Easiest route: Scramble by southwest ridge or south slope, class 2

Birch Mountain, or Paokrung (Northern Paiute for "Mountain of Stone"), is one of the fifty highest peaks of California. Of the major peaks of the Palisades, it stands farthest from the Sierra Crest.

Judging by its few summit register entries, it is climbed far less than its nearby fourteener neighbors on the crest. But its placement on the Sierra Peaks Section list adds to its appeal to peak baggers, and its low technical demand makes it a rewarding ski mountaineering destination.

== See also ==
- Mountain peaks of California
- Palisades of the Sierra Nevada
- Thirteener

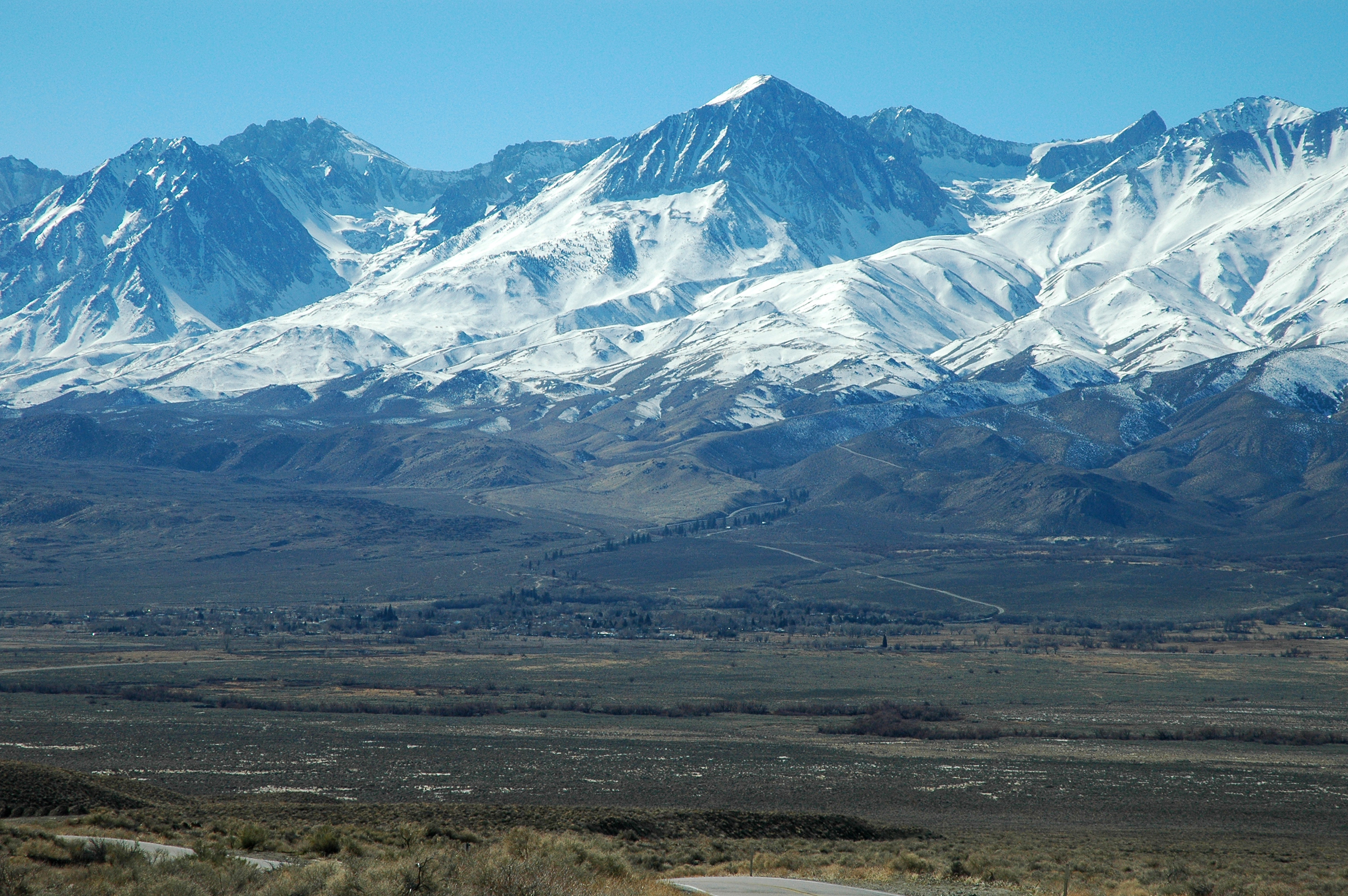
Birch Mountain centered, from the northeast across Owens Valley.
