= Middle Palisade =

Mountain of the Sierra Nevada in California, United States

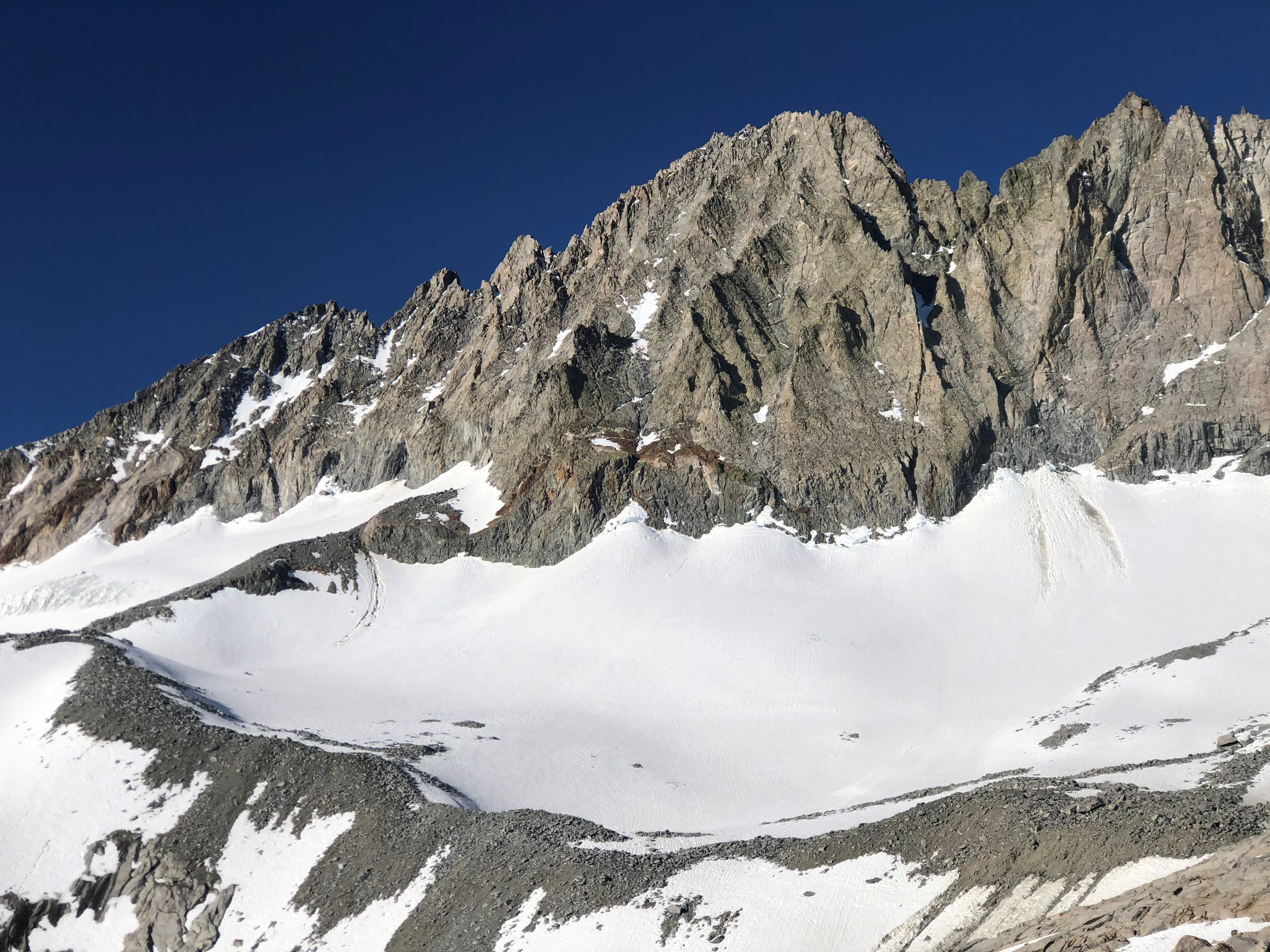
- Middle Palisade's eastern aspect, above Middle Palisade Glacier, in June 2020

Highest point
- Elevation: 14,018 ft (4,273 m) NAVD 88
- Prominence: 1,085 ft (331 m)
- Parent peak: North Palisade
- Listing: California fourteeners 11th; SPS Mountaineers peak; Western States Climbers Star peak
- Coordinates: 37°04′13″N 118°28′09″W

Geography
- Location within California
- Parent range: Sierra Nevada
- Topo map: USGS Split Mountain

Climbing
- First ascent: August 26, 1921 by Francis Farquhar and Ansel Hall
- Easiest route: East Face: Exposed scramble, class 3

Middle Palisade is a 14,018-foot (4,273-meter) peak in the central Sierra Nevada mountain range in the U.S. state of California. It is a fourteener, and lies on the Sierra Crest as part of the Palisades group, a group of prominent Sierra Nevada mountain summits that includes multiple other fourteeners, approximately 12 miles (19 km) southwest of the town of Big Pine. Middle Palisade is the twelfth highest peak in California.

Middle Palisade's eastern flank hosts the Middle Palisade Glacier, lying above the South Fork of Big Pine Creek. To Middle Palisade's west lie the Palisade Lakes, Palisade Creek, and the John Muir Trail as it ascends south towards Mather Pass.

Several routes involving exposed scrambling class 3 and/or easy technical rock climbing (class 4) exist on the various flanks of Middle Palisade. Some routes involve travel on the Middle Palisade Glacier. The easiest route involves scrambling (class 3) up a chute on the east face of the peak.

== See also ==
- List of California fourteeners
- The Palisades of the Sierra Nevada
- Disappointment Peak
