= Palisades (California Sierra) =

Group of mountains within the Sierra Nevada of California, United States

The Palisades
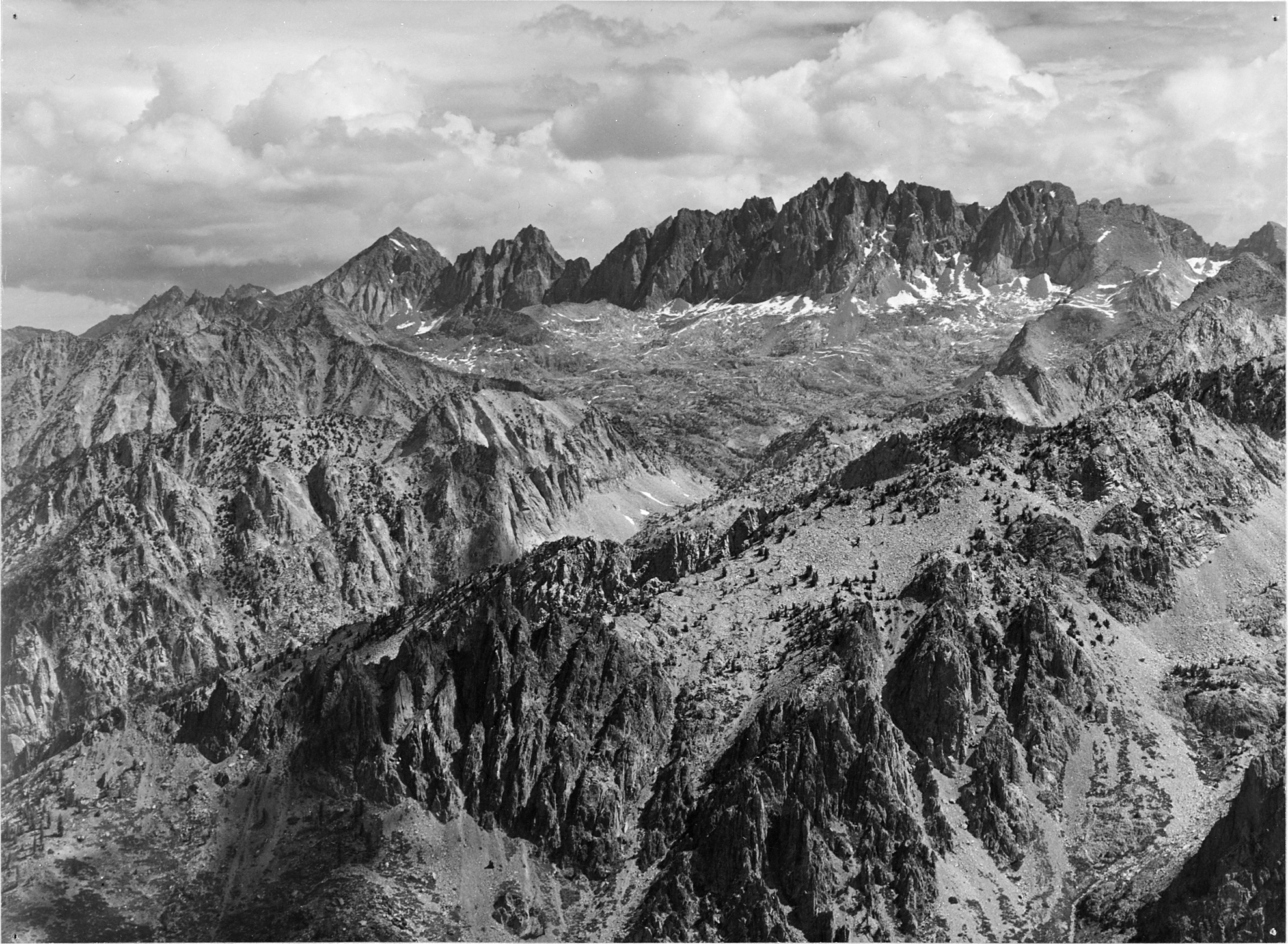
- North Palisade from Windy Point (by Ansel Adams, 1936)

Highest point
- Peak: North Palisade
- Elevation: 14,248 ft (4,343 m) NAVD 88
- Coordinates: 37°05′39″N 118°30′52″W

Dimensions
- Length: 30 mi (48 km) North-South
- Width: 21 mi (34 km) East-West

Geography
- Location within California
- Country: United States
- State: California
- Counties: Fresno and Inyo

The Palisades (or the Palisade Group) are a group of peaks in the central part of the Sierra Nevada in the U.S. state of California. They are located about 12 miles (19 km) southwest of the town of Big Pine, California. The peaks in the group are particularly steep, rugged peaks and "contain the finest alpine climbing in California." The group makes up about 6 miles (10 km) of the Sierra Crest, which divides the Central Valley watershed from the Owens Valley, and which runs generally northwest to southeast.

== Situation ==
Josiah Whitney in his book Geology, Volume 1 writes:

"At the head of the north fork, along the main crest of the Sierra, is a range of peaks, from 13,500 to 14,000 feet high, which we called 'the Palisades.' These were unlike the rest of the crest in outline and color, and were doubtless volcanic; they were very grand and fantastic in shape."

Although referred to by early geologists as "volcanic", the Palisades are a dark granitic rock. On the northeast side of the group lie the Palisade Glacier and the Middle Palisade Glacier, the largest glaciers in the Sierra Nevada. These glaciers feed Big Pine Creek.

Notable peaks of the group include four independent fourteeners:

- North Palisade, 14,248 ft (4,343 m)
- Mount Sill, 14,159 ft (4,316 m)
- Split Mountain, 14,064 ft (4,287 m)
- Middle Palisade, 14,018 ft (4,273 m)

and the following mountains in addition:

- Mount Agassiz, 13,899 ft (4,236 m), the northwesternmost peak of the group before Bishop Pass.
- Birch Mountain, 13,608 ft (4,148 m), which juts out further towards the Owens Valley than the rest of the group.
- Norman Clyde Peak, 13,861 ft (4,225 m)
- Palisade Crest, 13,559 ft (4,133 m)
- Mount Gayley, 13,510 ft (4,118 m)
- Temple Crag, 12,982 ft (3,957 m), known for its many rock climbing routes.
- Mount Winchell, 13,781 ft (4,200 m)
- The Thumb, 13,356 ft (4,071 m), also known as "East Palisade."

North Palisade has some additional subpeaks over 14,000 feet (4,267 m); see the North Palisade article for those summits.

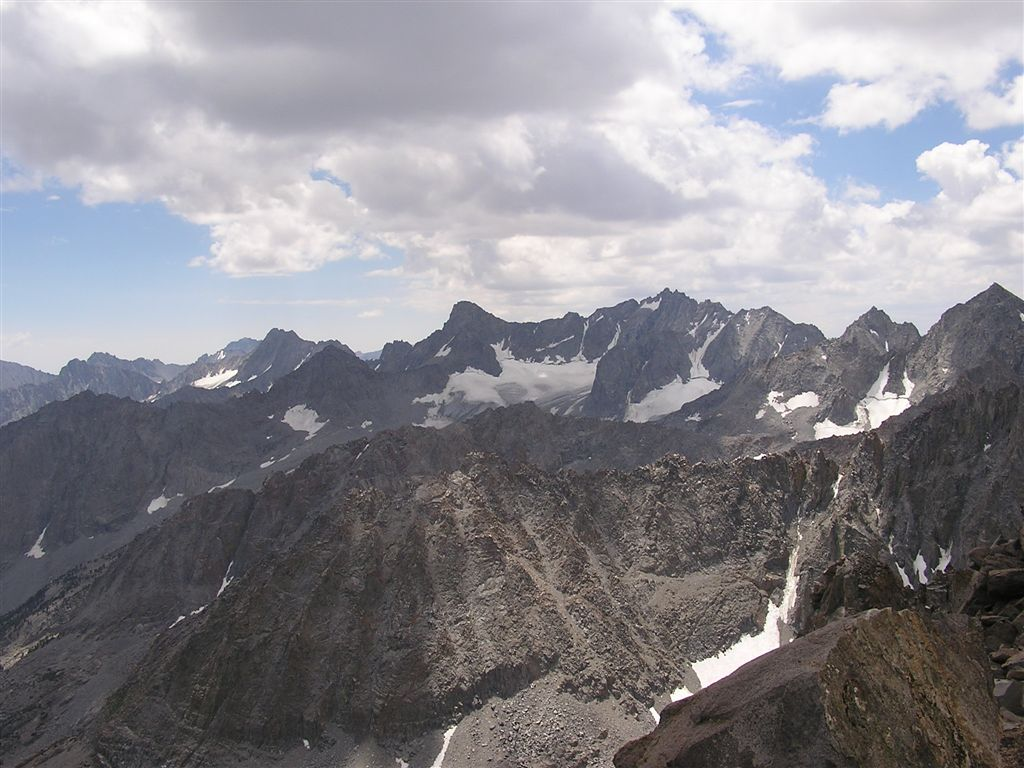
The Palisades' north faces, from Cloudripper, July 2007

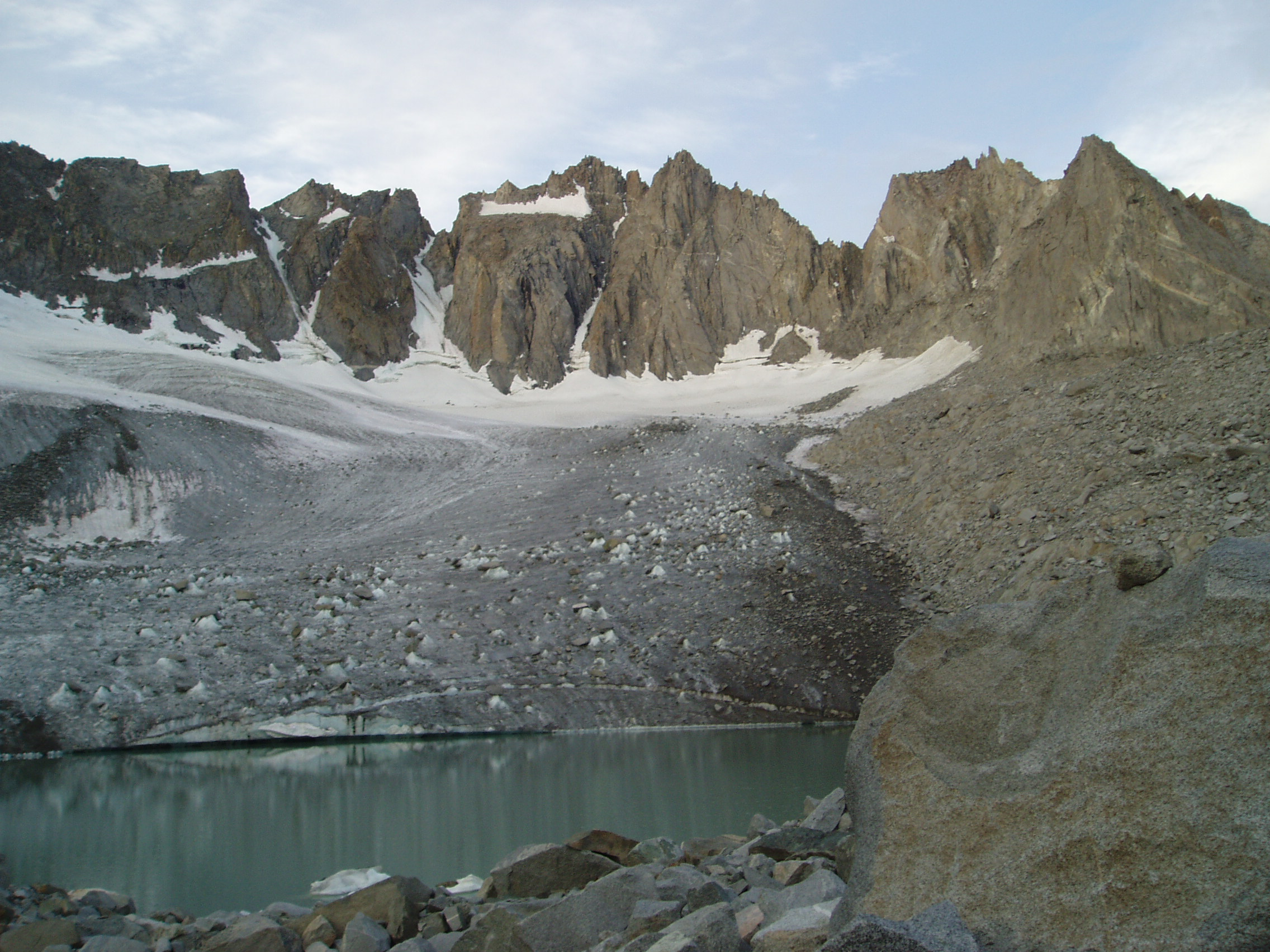
North Palisade and Thunderbolt Peak, from the Palisade Glacier
