= Big Pine Creek (California) =

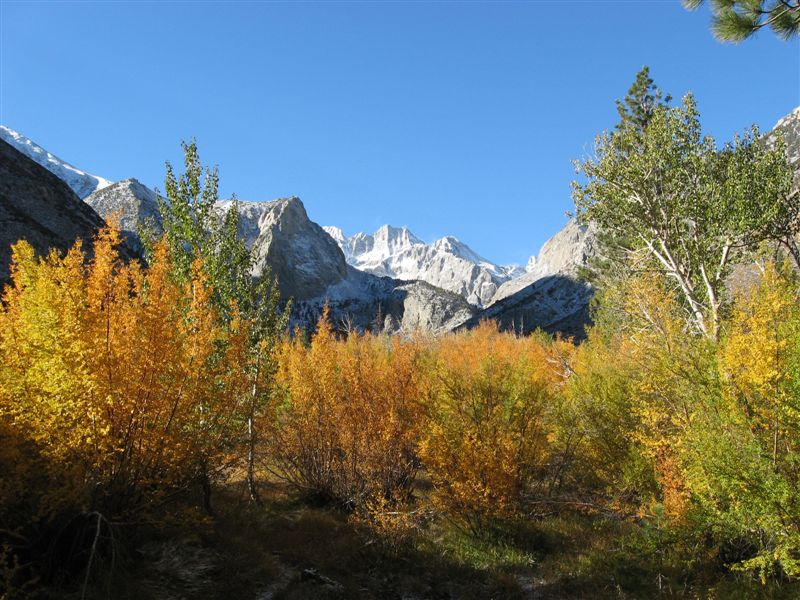
- View of Norman Clyde Peak from Big Pine Creek, autumn

- Location of mouth in CA

Location
- Country: United States
- State: California
- Region: Inyo County
- District: Inyo National Forest

Physical characteristics
- Source: Sierra Nevada
  - coordinates: 37°07′29″N 118°26′13″W
- Mouth: Owens River
  - coordinates: 37°10′22″N 118°15′34″W

Big Pine Creek is a 12.1-mile-long (19.5 km) stream in Inyo County of eastern California, in the western United States. It flows from the eastern Sierra Nevada down to the Owens Valley, where it is a major tributary of the Owens River near Big Pine.

== Course ==
The headwaters of Big Pine Creek are in the eastern slopes of the Sierra Nevada, near the border with Fresno County. The creek begins at the confluence of its North and South Forks, below the Palisades.

From there, the creek flows east-northeast, passing Crater Mountain of the Big Pine volcanic field and intersecting Big Pine Canal before joining the Owens River near the town of Big Pine. The total average runoff from the watershed is 52,000 acre-feet (64,000,000 m^{3}), mostly from Big Pine Creek itself.

== Uses ==
Despite its name, Big Pine Canal does not divert water from Big Pine Creek, it comes from the Owens River upstream. The canal provides water to the Big Pine area for irrigation, recreation and groundwater recharge. There are no storage dams or reservoirs, but the Los Angeles Department of Water and Power operates a 3.2 MW hydroelectric plant on the creek, which dewaters it. Also, some water is diverted for domestic use and irrigation on nearby Indian reservations.

== Historic landmark ==
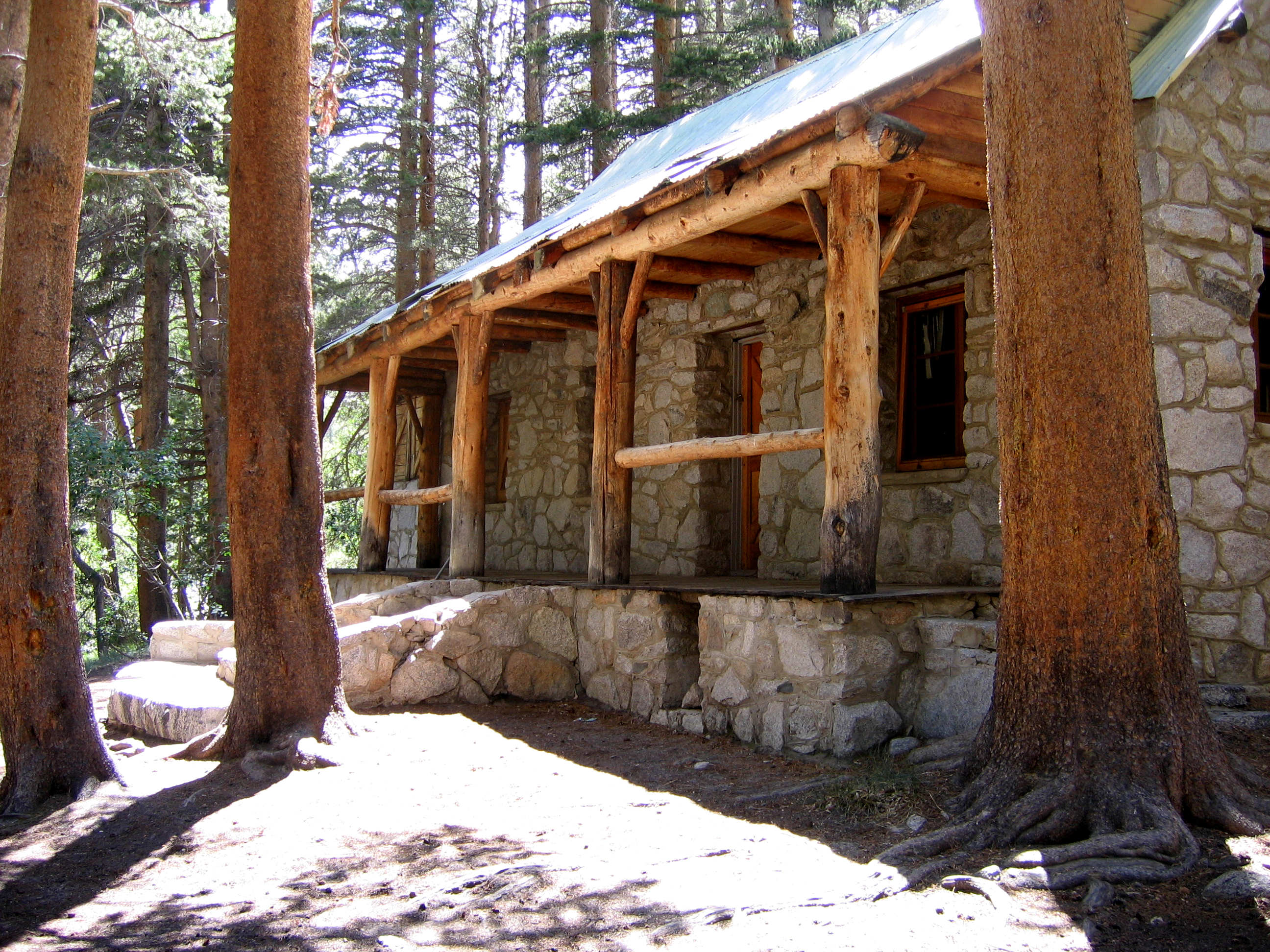
The historic landmark Lon Chaney—Paul Williams cabin on the North Fork Big Pine Creek.

The actor Lon Chaney had a stone cabin built on the North Fork of Big Pine Creek, as a personal retreat. The cabin was designed in 1929 by renowned Southern California architect Paul Williams. It still stands, preserved in the Inyo National Forest, and listed on the National Register of Historic Places.

High above the cabin are numerous lakes, some which are of greenish hue due to glacial melt.
