= Jules Eichorn =

American mountaineer and music teacher (1912–2000)

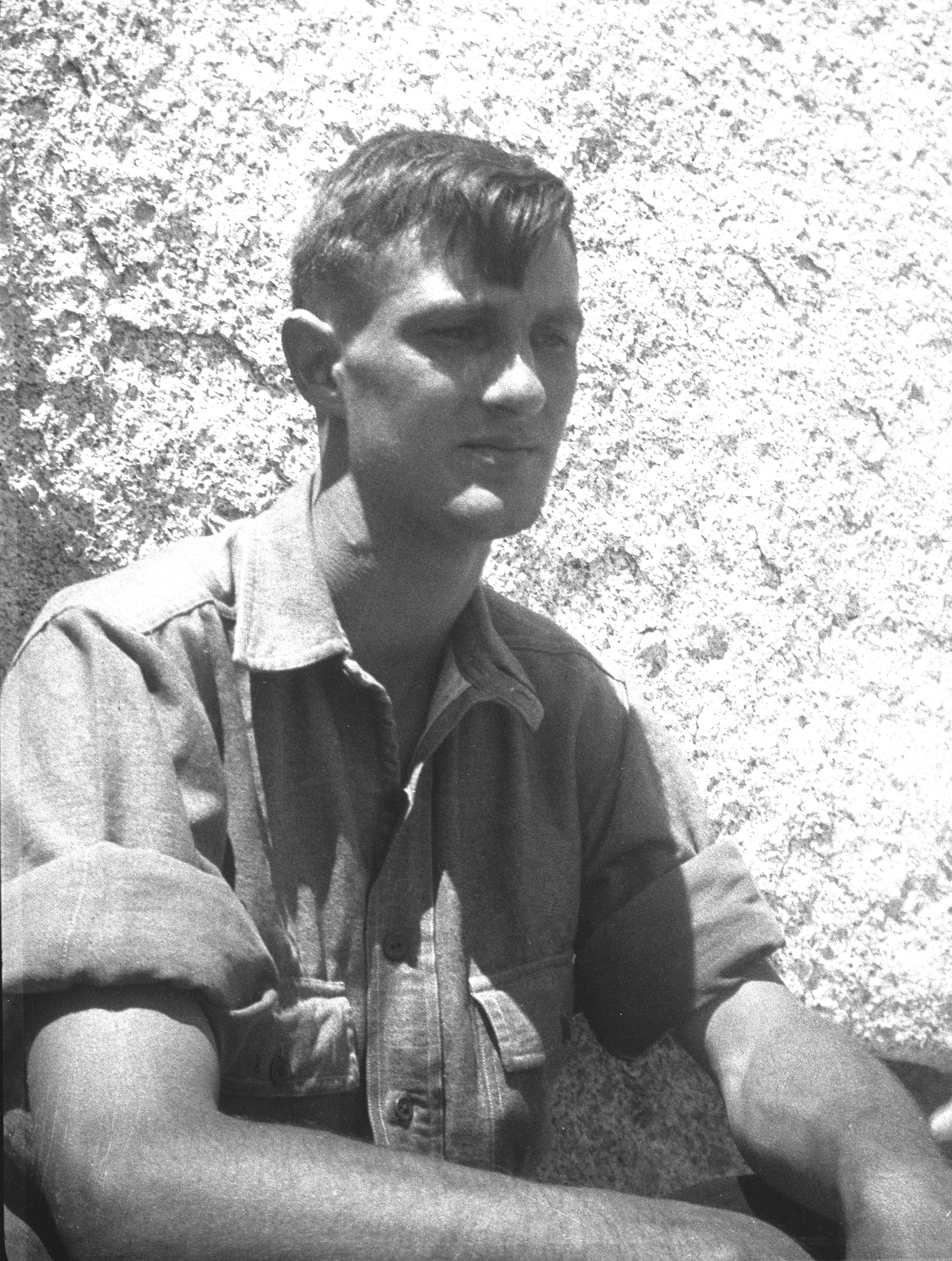
- Eichorn in the Sierra Nevada in 1931
- Born: Jules Marquard Eichorn; 7 February 1912; San Francisco, California, U.S.
- Died: 15 February 2000 (aged 88); Redwood City, California, U.S.
- Education: University of California, Berkeley (1938)
- Occupations: Mountaineer; Music teacher Environmentalist
- Years active: 1927–1970s
- Known for: Pioneer of technical rock climbing in the Sierra Nevada; first ascent of the East Face of Mount Whitney
- Notable work: First ascent of: Higher Cathedral Spire (1934); The East Face of Mt. Whitney (1931); Thunderbolt Peak (1931); Eichorn Minaret (1931)
- Relatives: Parents: Hilmar and Frieda Eichorn; Friend/Mentor: Ansel Adams
- Awards: Francis P. Farquhar Mountaineering Award (1972); Director of the Sierra Club (1961–1967)

Jules Marquard Eichorn (February 7, 1912 – February 15, 2000) was an American mountaineer, environmentalist, and music teacher.

== Early years ==
Jules Marquard Eichorn was born in San Francisco on February 7, 1912, to Hilmar and Frieda Eichorn, who were immigrants from Germany. As a youngster, he often hiked on the slopes of Mount Tamalpais in Marin County, California with his parents and siblings. He showed musical talent and began studying violin at a young age. In 1927, he began piano lessons, and his first instructor was Ansel Adams. Eichorn was also Adams's first piano student. That summer, Eichorn joined Adams on the Sierra Club annual High Trip, which included a climb of Alta Peak in Sequoia National Park. That climb sparked the 15-year-old Eichorn's love of mountaineering.

Eichorn worked for Ansel Adams washing photographic prints and hauling photographic equipment in exchange for piano lessons, and their friendship lasted until Adams's death in 1984. After graduating from Lick-Wilmerding High School in San Francisco in 1929, Eichorn traveled to the Teton Range of Wyoming in 1930 for a summer climbing trip.

== Mountaineering achievements ==
On July 6, 1930, during the Sierra Club's annual High Trip, he first teamed up with Glen Dawson to make the third ascent of Red and White Mountain in the Sierra. They continued at a fast pace to climb Mount Abbot, Bear Creek Spire, Mount Dade, Turret Peak, Mount Darwin, The Hermit, Mount McGee, a first ascent of the (later named) Mount Mendel, Mount Goddard, Devils Crags, Mount Woodworth, Middle Palisade, Mount Sill, North Palisade, Polemonium Peak, Mount Winchell and Mount Agassiz. All of these climbs were completed in 24 days. Sierra Club Secretary Will Colby wrote, "Some youthful enthusiasts, including Glen Dawson, Jules Eichorn and John Olmstead, swarmed over everything that looked formidable in the way of a mountain peak."

In 1931, Sierra Club leader Francis P. Farquhar invited Harvard philosophy professor and Appalachian Mountain Club member Robert L. M. Underhill to come to the Sierra Nevada to teach the latest techniques of roped climbing. Underhill had learned these techniques in the Alps, and had used them earlier that summer in the Tetons and the Canadian Rockies. Jules Eichorn was among the first group of Californians who practiced these techniques on Mount Ritter and Banner Peak in the Ritter Range. After the basic course was completed, the more advanced students, including Eichorn, his climbing partner Glen Dawson, Norman Clyde, Lewis Clark, and Bestor Robinson traveled south to the Palisades, the most rugged and alpine part of the Sierra Nevada. There, on August 13, 1931, the party completed the first ascent of the last unclimbed 14,000+ foot peak in California, which remained unnamed due to its remote location above the Palisade Glaciers. After a challenging ascent to the summit, the climbers were caught in an intense lightning storm, and Eichorn barely escaped electrocution when "a thunderbolt whizzed right by my ear". The mountain was named Thunderbolt Peak to commemorate that close call. Underhill called Dawson and Eichorn "young natural-born rock climbers of the first water."

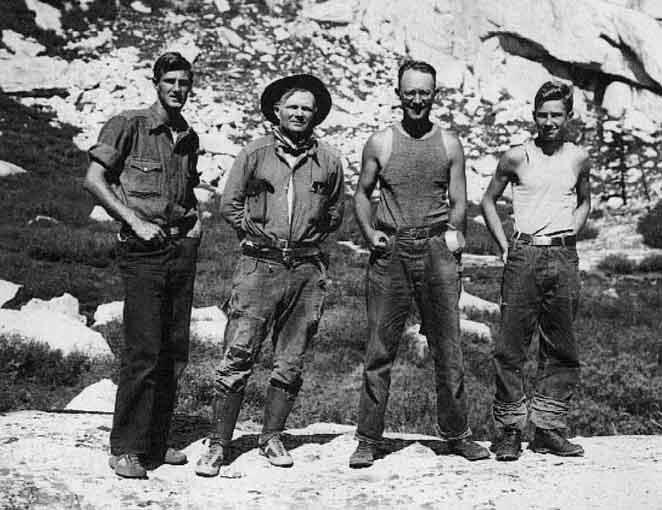
Photo of Jules Eichorn, Norman Clyde, Robert L. M. Underhill and Glen Dawson taken the day after the first ascent of the East Face of Mount Whitney.

Three days later on August 16, Eichorn, Clyde, Underhill and Dawson completed the first ascent of the East Face of Mount Whitney, the highest peak in the contiguous United States. The route was extremely exposed, especially the famous Fresh Air Traverse. Eichorn was just 19 years old. Steve Roper called this route "one of the classic routes of the Sierra, partly because of its spectacular location and partly because it was the first really big wall to be climbed in the range." Porcella & Burns wrote that "the climb heralded a new standard of technical competence in Californian rock climbing . . ." Eichorn's 1931 experiences led to a lifelong friendship with Norman Clyde, who was, by most accounts, California's greatest mountaineer of the first half of the 20th century.

These two classic climbs were among at least 26 first ascents that Eichorn completed in the High Sierra between 1930 and 1952. His other first ascents included the Dragtooth, Finger Peaks, Matthes crest, Eichorn Minaret, Waller Minaret, Clyde Spires, Mt. McGee, Frustration Turret, Pyramidal Pinnacle, and Red Spur. His first ascents of new routes on previously climbed peaks include Matterhorn Peak, Mount Hoffmann, Cathedral Peak, Banner Peak, Michael Minaret, Mount Winchell, Temple Crag, Middle Palisade, the ridge traverse from North Palisade to Starlight Peak, Deerhorn Mountain, Mt. Ericsson, Mount Russell and three routes on the Devil's Crags.

In early August 1933, young solo climber and guidebook author Walter A. Starr, Jr., nicknamed "Pete", disappeared in the Minarets. Beginning on August 15, a dozen skilled climbers including Eichorn, Clyde and Dawson spent four days searching unsuccessfully for Pete Starr. Norman Clyde continued to search alone, and discovered Starr's body on Michael Minaret on August 25, where he had fallen to his death. Eichorn and Clyde later climbed back to the location of the body, and interred the remains in a mountain tomb that they built on the ledge. Eichorn handled the body as Clyde had an aversion to touching corpses. Starr's grateful (and wealthy) parents rewarded Eichorn with a scholarship to the University of California, Berkeley, where he majored in music and earned a teaching credential.

In 1934, Eichorn, Robinson and Dick Leonard of the Cragmont Climbing Club assembled the most advanced set of climbing gear then in use in North America, much of which they had obtained from Germany, and successfully climbed Higher Cathedral Spire in Yosemite Valley. This was the first major technical ascent in the valley that later became a mecca of rock climbing. This was the first climb in California to utilize pitons. Writing about this climb, Bestor Robinson described Eichorn's "remarkable sense of balance and ability to stick to next to nothing."

In the late 1930s, Eichorn contracted Coccidioidomycosis, also called Valley Fever, a potentially fatal fungal disease that affects the lungs. This infection kept him out of the military during World War II. Instead, he spent the war years teaching mountaineering skills to rangers in Yosemite National Park.

== Environmental leader ==
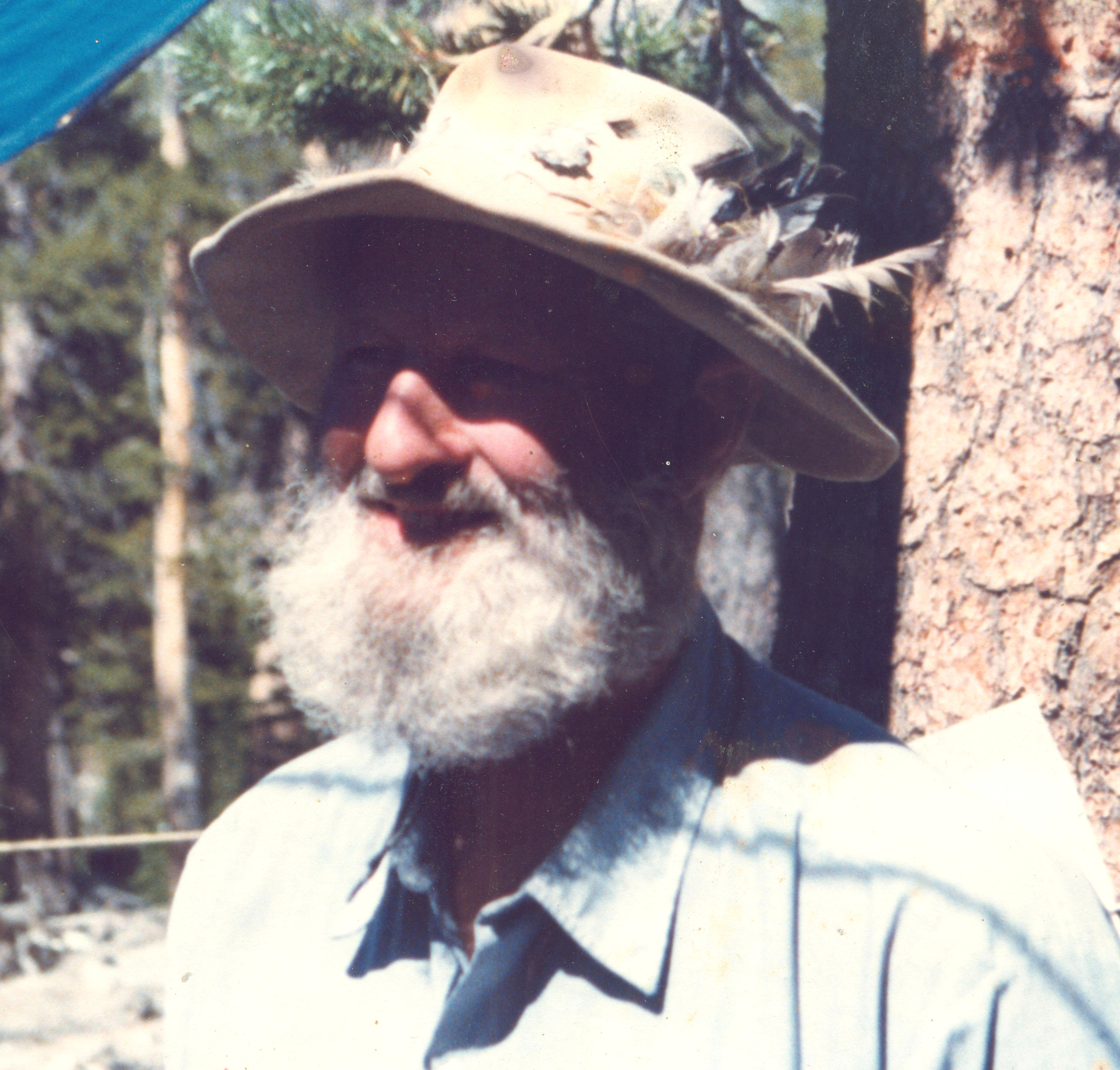
Jules Eichorn at a Sierra Club Mountaineering Base Camp in the Minarets Range of the Sierra Nevada in the late 1970s

Eichorn taught instrumental, orchestral and choral music in the Woodside High School for several decades. In the 1950s, he led month-long "cache and carry" youth hikes in the Sierra Nevada and also served as a volunteer on Sierra Club mountaineering base camp trips through the 1970s. He collaborated with Sierra mule packer Charley Robinson on several of these trips, moving supplies to hikers and climbers using a mule train.

He became a political activist, opposing development and wetland filling along the San Mateo County, California coast of San Francisco Bay. He was an active member of the Loma Prieta chapter of the Sierra Club for many years. In 1961, he was elected to the national board of directors of the Sierra Club, and served from 1961 to 1967. Among his colleagues on the board in those years was Supreme Court Justice William O. Douglas, photographer Ansel Adams and Pulitzer Prize-winning novelist Wallace Stegner.

Eichorn died in his sleep at his home in Redwood City, California on February 15, 2000, eight days after his 88th birthday.

== Legacy ==
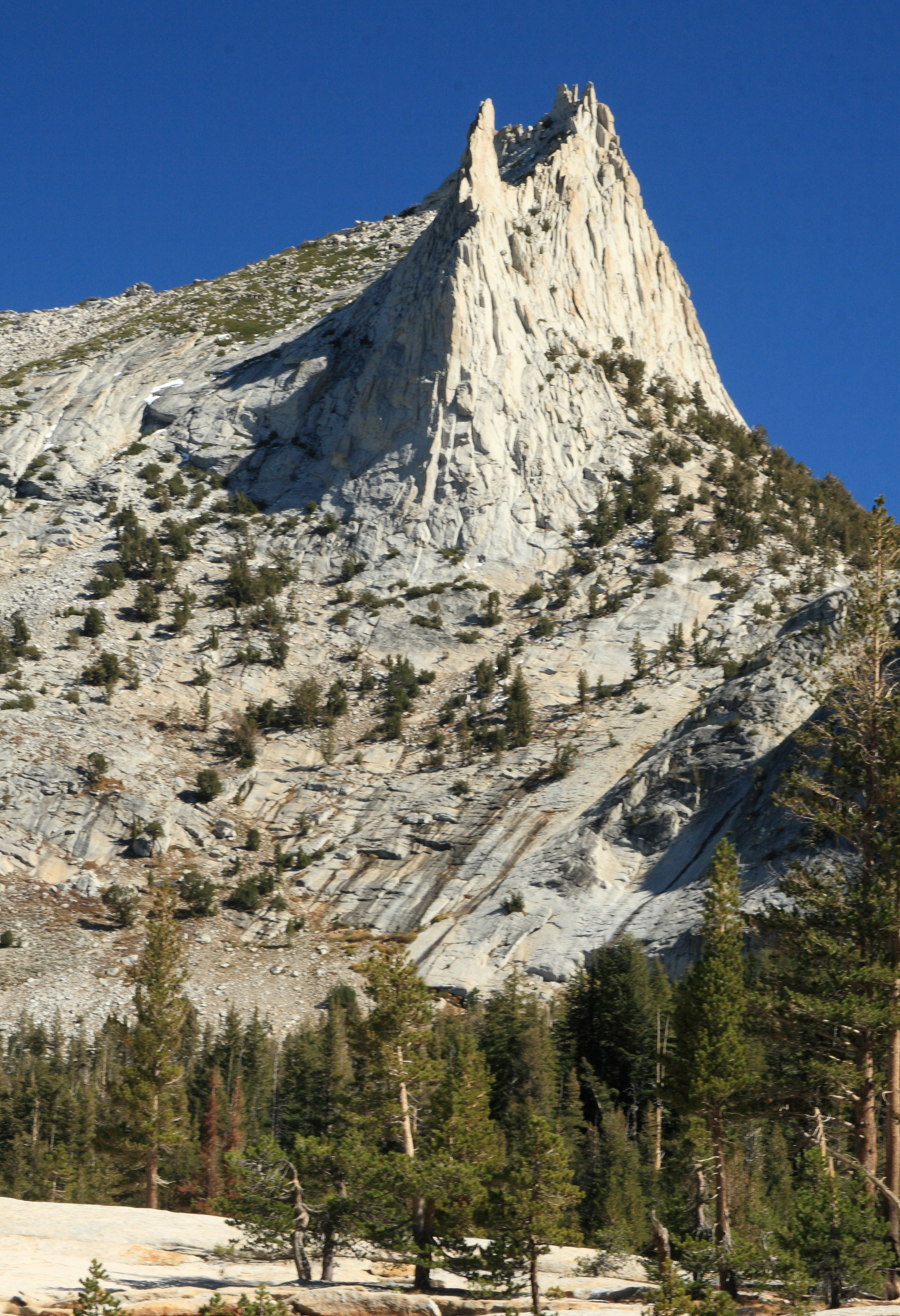
Eichorn Pinnacle on Cathedral Peak

Two Sierra Nevada peaks are named after Jules Eichorn. Eichorn Pinnacle (~10,940 feet) is the spectacular west summit of Cathedral Peak near Tuolumne Meadows in Yosemite National Park. Jules Eichorn climbed this pinnacle in 1931.

Eichorn Minaret (12,255 feet) is one of the Minarets in the Ritter Range, located in the Ansel Adams Wilderness.

The Jules Eichorn Memorial Grove is located in Big Basin Redwoods State Park in Santa Cruz County, California.

Eichorn was the winner of the Sierra Club's Francis P. Farquhar Mountaineering Award for 1972.

His personal slogan was "Music and the mountains; they're the greatest."
