= Glen Dawson (climber) =

American mountain climber (1912–2016)

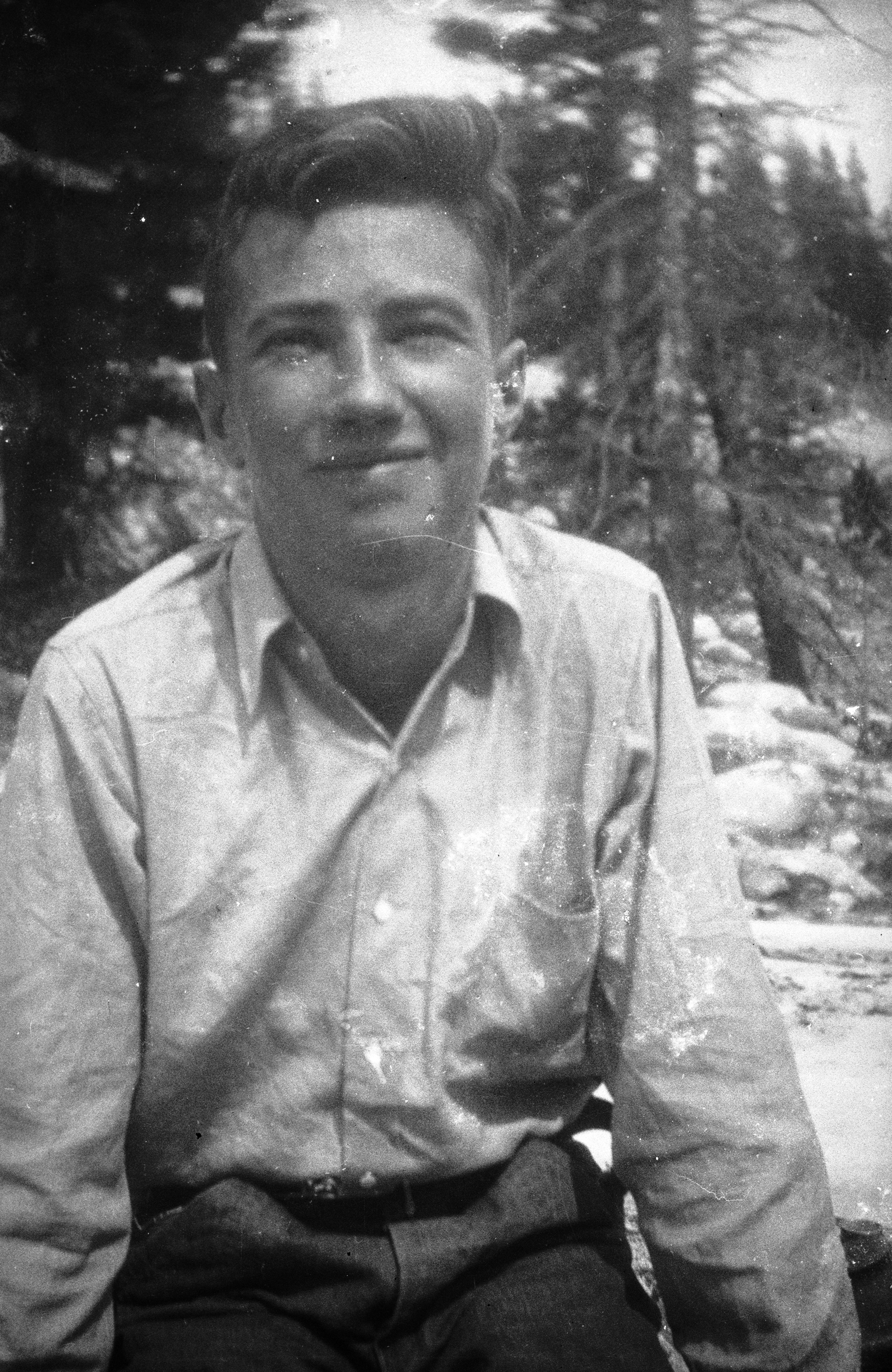
Glen Dawson in the Sierra Nevada in 1931

Glen Dawson (June 3, 1912 – March 22, 2016) was an American rock climber, mountaineer, antiquarian bookseller, publisher and environmentalist.

== Early life ==
His father, Ernest Dawson (1882–1947), was also a climber, antiquarian bookseller, and Sierra Club leader, who served as Sierra Club president from 1934 - 1937. Glen climbed White Mountain Peak in 1927. In 1928, Glen and his father climbed the Matterhorn with two Swiss guides.

== Climbing career ==
=== 1929–1930 ===
In 1929, Dawson began serious mountaineering in the Sierra Nevada. With John Nixon and experienced climber Bill Horsfall, he climbed Mount Abbot, Mount Mills, Mount Hooper, Mount Humphreys, and the (later named) Clyde Minaret.

On July 6, 1930, during the Sierra Club's annual High Trip, he first teamed up with Jules Eichorn to make the third ascent of Red-and-White Mountain in the Sierra. They continued at a fast pace to climb Mount Abbot, Bear Creek Spire, Mount Dade, Turret Peak, Mount Darwin, The Hermit, Mount McGee, a first ascent of the (later named) Mount Mendel, Mount Goddard, Devils Crags, Mount Woodworth, Middle Palisade, Mount Sill, North Palisade, Polemonium Peak, Mount Winchell and Mount Agassiz. All of these climbs were completed in 24 days. Sierra Club Secretary Will Colby wrote, "Some youthful enthusiasts, including Glen Dawson, Jules Eichorn and John Olmstead, swarmed over everything that looked formidable in the way of a mountain peak."

=== 1931 season ===
On July 12, 1931, Francis P. Farquhar led a Sierra Club climbing school on Unicorn Peak near Yosemite National Park's Tuolumne Meadows. Dawson and Eichorn completed the first traverse of Unicorn Peak that day, and continued on to make the second ascent of Cockscomb Peak. They then joined up with young climber Walter (Bubs) Brem, hiked to Sawtooth Ridge and made a first ascent of Finger Peaks, a new route on the northwest face of Matterhorn Peak, and the first ascent of (later named) The Dragtooth. Returning to Tuolumne Meadows, Dawson and Eichorn climbed Cathedral Peak on July 24, and made the first ascent of its prominent west pinnacle, later named Eichorn Pinnacle. Joined by Brem, the trio then made the first ascent of Echo Ridge, later renamed Matthes Crest.

The trio then moved south to the Minarets Range, and in a 14-hour effort, climbed Michael Minaret, Clyde Minaret, and the first ascent of Third Minaret (later renamed Eichorn Minaret). These are the three highest peaks in the Minarets.

Sierra Club leader Farquhar had invited Harvard philosophy professor and Appalachian Mountain Club member Robert L. M. Underhill to come to the Sierra Nevada to teach the latest techniques of roped climbing. Underhill had learned these techniques in the Alps, and had used them earlier that summer in the Tetons and the Canadian Rockies. After the basic course was completed, the more advanced students, including Dawson, Eichorn, Norman Clyde, Lewis Clark, and Bestor Robinson, traveled south to the Palisades, the most rugged and alpine part of the Sierra Nevada. There, on August 13, 1931, the party completed the first ascent of the last unclimbed 14,000+ foot peak in California, which remained unnamed due to its remote location above the Palisade Glaciers. After a challenging ascent to the summit, the climbers were caught in an intense lightning storm, and Eichorn barely escaped electrocution when "a thunderbolt whizzed right by my ear". The mountain was named Thunderbolt Peak to commemorate that close call. Underhill called Dawson and Eichorn "young natural-born rock climbers of the first water."

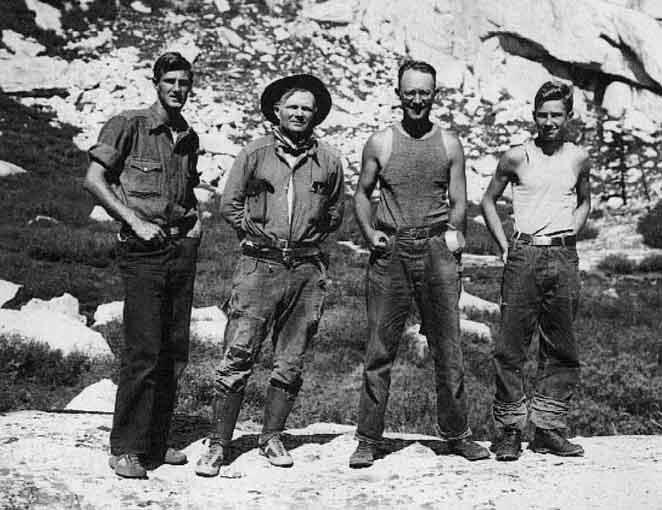
Photo of Jules Eichorn, Norman Clyde, Robert L. M. Underhill and Glen Dawson taken the day after the first ascent of the East Face of Mount Whitney.

Three days later on August 16, Dawson, Eichorn, Clyde, and Underhill completed the first ascent of the East Face of Mount Whitney, the highest peak in the contiguous United States. The route was extremely exposed, especially the famous Fresh Air Traverse. Dawson was just 19 years old. Steve Roper called this route "one of the classic routes of the Sierra, partly because of its spectacular location and partly because it was the first really big wall to be climbed in the range." Porcella & Burns wrote that "the climb heralded a new standard of technical competence in Californian rock climbing . . ." In Dawson's opinion, this was his most famous climb. At age 19, Dawson was already among the most accomplished mountaineers in California. Many years later, Dawson modestly wrote, "I am notable only as an historical curiosity or perhaps as a living fossil. My career as a rock climber spanned the years 1927 to about 1938. During my lifetime I have been an antiquarian bookseller and publisher but that one event of August 16, 1931 is my footnote in climbing history"

That fall, Dawson began his freshman year at UCLA as a history major.

=== 1932 season ===
After four days of climbing, on June 15, 1932, Dawson, along with Clyde, Brem, Bestor Robinson and Dick Jones, reached the summit of El Picacho del Diablo, the highest peak in Baja California. They had thought that this was the first ascent, but they discovered a cairn on the summit. They later learned that mapmaker Donald McLain had made the first ascent in 1911.

Returning to the Sierra Nevada, Dawson, Eichorn and Clyde joined the Sierra Club High Trip with 199 participants plus 25 mules with wranglers and horses. Dawson led a group to the summit of what was later named Mount Farquhar. Along with Thomas Rawles and Hans Helmut Leschke, he climbed the most difficult (#8) of the Kearsarge Pinnacles. A party of 16, including Dawson, Clyde, Farquhar and Eichorn then climbed Junction Peak. Dawson, Eichorn, Brem and Leschke then climbed a new route on Mount Russell, by way of the south face, west chute. Dawson then climbed the Red Kaweah and the Black Kaweah.

Over the Labor Day weekend of 1932, Dawson and Dick Jones climbed Mount McAdie. Dawson served as Mountaineering Notes Editor for the Sierra Club Bulletin for 1932.

=== 1933 season ===
On February 22, 1933, Dawson made the first ski ascent of Telegraph Peak in the San Gabriel Mountains.

In 1933, Dawson, Eichorn and Dick Jones made the first ascent of what was later named Dawson Minaret in the Minarets. On the Sierra Club's annual High Trip, Dawson, along with Neil Ruge and Alfred Weiler, made a first ascent of the highest peak in The Pinnacles, two miles (3 km) west of Hutchison Meadow. With his sister Fern Dawson, he climbed Pilot Knob. With Bahlah Ballantine and Neil Ruge, he made a first ascent of unnamed Peak 13,332 near Mount Darwin. On July 25, 1933, he again surveyed the forbidding Devils Crags. In the days that followed, Dawson and other Sierra Club members made several successful ascents of the various summits. Later, he made a possible first ascent of Rambaud Peak, bringing his younger brother, Muir Dawson, along on the climb. With Eichorn, he pioneered a new route to Middle Palisade, climbing the (later named) Norman Clyde Peak along the way.."

Along with several other climbers, Dawson participated in the search for missing solo climber Walter A. Starr, Jr. in the Minarets in August, 1933, but was unsuccessful. This search was the last time that Dawson climbed on the same rope with Jules Eichorn. Norman Clyde later found Starr's body. Dawson wrote the foreword to the definitive book about this episode.

Dawson was among the founders of the Rock Climbing Section of the Southern California Chapter of the Sierra Club which began on November 5, 1933, with practice climbing at Eagle Rock. In December, 1933, the group completed challenging climbs on Castle Dome 20 miles north of Yuma, Arizona on the California side of the Colorado River. They also climbed Picacho Peak in Arizona.

=== 1934–35 season ===
On the 4th of July weekend of 1934, Dawson along with Ted Waller completed the second ascent of the East Face of Mount Whitney, which he had first climbed in 1931. On July 11, 1934, Dawson, Jack Riegelhuth and Neil Ruge completed the first ascent of the Sierra Nevada peak later named Mount Ansel Adams. He also made the second ascent of Eichorn Pinnacle on that trip. In the Sawtooth Ridge area, he completed the first east to west traverse of The Three Teeth. With Riegelhuth and Ansel Adams, he made the first ascent of Blacksmith Peak, and then led a traverse from South Whorl to Whorl Peak.

Heading north with Tony Charlton of the New Zealand Alpine Club, they climbed Mount Shasta, and in Oregon, Mount Thielsen, Three-Fingered Jack and Mount Washington. Continuing to Washington, they climbed Mount Rainier. They proceeded to the Canadian Rockies, where they climbed Mount Hungabee and Mount Temple in Banff National Park.

On November 7, 1934, Dawson was part of the founding of the Ski Mountaineers of California. UCLA professor Walt Mosauer was the first president of the group, which later became the Ski Mountaineers Section of the Angeles Chapter of the Sierra Club..."

In February, 1935 Dawson, Mosauer and several others attempted a number of winter ascents in the Bridgeport and Mammoth areas of the Sierra Nevada, but were turned back by storms. They finally succeeded in a ski ascent of Mammoth Mountain. This was many years before the downhill ski resort was established there.

=== 1935 – 1936 World Climbing Tour ===
In June 1935, after graduating from UCLA, Dawson set off on a long journey. Heading east by Greyhound bus, he visited Carlsbad Caverns and the Great Smoky Mountains National Park. From Boston, he sailed on an Italian freighter to Trieste and then climbed in the Dolomites, including an ascent of the south wall of the Marmolata. In the Wetterstein of southern Bavaria, he climbed the Kubanek-Spiondler route on the south face of the Musterstein. He also climbed the Schusselkarspitze-Sudwand, probably the first ascent by an American. In all, he completed about 30 different climbs in the Alps in a six-week period.

He continued to North Wales, where he climbed the Tennis Shoe route on the Idwal. He then traveled to the Soviet Union, where bad weather prevented a planned climb of Mount Elbrus. He crossed Siberia by train and arrived in Japan. There he completed several challenging climbs in the Mount Yari and Hodaka regions, and traversed Mount Fuji.

Upon his return to the United States in 1936 after 14 months of overseas travel, he wrote, "After having climbed in a dozen different countries I can agree with John Muir and Clarence King that our own High Sierra is the finest and most friendly of all."

=== 1937 season ===
In 1937, Dawson and Dick Jones led a first ascent of The Mechanic's Route on Tahquitz Rock, one of the first YDS 5.8 routes in the country and a daring feat due to the shortage of protection and the primitive gear of the time. The route was the original standard used to define 5.8 in the YDS. Tahquitz was then a new location for top Southern California rock climbers, since it is far closer to the Los Angeles area than Yosemite Valley.

On September 5, 1937, Dawson, along with his brother Muir Dawson, Dick Jones, Bob Brinton and Howard Koster put up a new route on Mount Whitney, to the right of his 1931 East face route. This route, called the East Buttress route is rated YDS III 5.7, and is nicknamed the "Peewee Route".

== Later life ==
Dawson served as a director of the Sierra Club from 1937 to 1951. His club service was interrupted from 1944 to 1947 because of military service. During World War II, Dawson served as a rock climbing and skiing instructor in the Tenth Mountain Division at Camp Hale, Colorado, and in Italy. He earned a Bronze Star in combat in Northern Italy.

Dawson had a long career succeeding his father Ernest as proprietor of Dawson's Book Shop in Los Angeles, an antiquarian bookstore in business since 1905. His brother Muir also participated in the business. He has also published 370 collectible books, including miniatures. The business is still in operation and is now run by Michael, the third generation. In 1990, Dawson was among a group of rare book experts who worked as consultants to the FBI on the case of Stephen Blumberg, a convicted thief who compulsively stole rare books. He helped determine the ownership of the books, which Blumberg had stolen from at least 327 libraries. He testified as an expert witness for the U. S. Government at Blumberg's trial, attesting for example that 271 items taken from the Connecticut State Library were worth $225,280.

In 1973, Dawson was the winner of the Sierra Club's Francis P. Farquhar Mountaineering Award, and in 2011, won the organization's Walter A. Starr Award for support of the club by a former director. Dawson stayed active in the mountaineering community, and willingly participated as a historical resource. In 2008, as the last surviving member of the climbing party that made the first ascent on Whitney's East Face in 1931, Glen wrote the foreword to the book, Climbing Mt. Whitney. In 2009, at the age of 97, he gave two public lectures on the occasion of the opening of an exhibit on the life of mountaineer Norman Clyde at the Eastern California Museum in Independence, California. On September 18, 2009, Dawson was awarded an honorary Doctor of Humane Letters degree from Azusa Pacific University for his accomplishments as a rare book expert, publisher and mountaineer. He was a resident of Pasadena, California, and turned 100 in June 2012.

At the time of his death, aged 103, Dawson had the longest tenure as a Sierra Club member, having been a club member for over 94 years.

== See also ==
- List of centenarians (miscellaneous)
