= Smoke Blanchard =

American mountain climber (1915–1989)

William Earl "Smoke" Blanchard
- Born: March 3, 1915; Montana
- Died: June 23, 1989 (aged 74); California
- Resting place: Big Pine Canyon, California
- Known for: Mountaineering

William Earl "Smoke" Blanchard (March 3, 1915 – June 23, 1989) was an American mountaineer, climber, trekking leader, guide, world traveler, writer, Buddhist, and a truck driver. He was born in Montana and moved to Portland, Oregon in his early childhood and discovered a love for mountains in the shadow of Mount Hood. He spent his formative mountaineering years on Mount Hood during the mid to late 1930s. He was present during the "Golden Age" of climbing on Mount Hood, and under the tutelage of Gary Leech became a proponent of climbing solo and establishing new routes on the mountain.

== Personal life ==
Smoke made his first trip to the Yosemite Valley in 1937 and later that summer stumbled into the Eastern Sierra town of Bishop. He relocated there from Portland before 1942. By 1943 he had "discovered" the Buttermilks, an area of rocks that became his playground, and the training ground for young climbers such as Doug Robinson, Galen Rowell, and Don Jenson.

In 1967, he married Su Ahlstrom after proposing to her on the top of Mount Hood. She had two children from a previous marriage, Glen and Lorelle, and Smoke had one son, Robert, from a previous marriage. Su died in 1976.

== Trekking in the Himalayas and Japan ==
He was widely known in the Himalayas by porters, cooks, trekking Sirdars, and fellow guides. He was so accepted into this small fraternal group that he became acquainted with both Edmund Hillary (who reviewed Smoke's 1984 book) and Tenzing Norgay. His relationship with Tenzing was both personal and professional, with the two leading treks in Bhutan together and sharing meals and time in Tenzing's home in Darjeeling.

Smoke's first association with nationally and internationally renowned climbers had started years earlier while still climbing the slopes of Mount Hood and continued after his move to Bishop. His friendship with uber-climber and California mountaineering legend Norman Clyde is well documented. Smoke was one of Clyde's last great friends in life and saw to the man's needs during the illness and decline that led to his death. In 1972, Smoke led a group that included his son Robert and Jules Eichorn to the top of Clyde Peak to scatter Clyde's ashes from that summit.

== Death ==
By 1989, Smoke was splitting his time between a home in Japan and his small apartment above a house he still owned in Bishop. He was in a relationship with a young Japanese woman named Keiko Ishikawa. Early that summer, they traveled from Japan to Italy to lead a walk in the Dolomites. He and Keiko then flew back to the U.S. to spend some time in Bishop. During the drive home from Los Angeles International Airport, Smoke relinquished the wheel to Keiko and crawled in the back of his small truck to sleep under the camper shell. Somewhere near the town of Mojave, Keiko lost control of the vehicle; it slipped from the road and rolled. She was relatively unhurt but Smoke suffered massive head trauma and after spending more than a week in intensive care, he died of his injuries on June 23, 1989.

His friends held a memorial service for him in the Buttermilk Rocks near Bishop as the summer climbing season wound down and before the Asian trekking season started, allowing all of his friends, fellow guides, and loved ones to be there. There was a light dusting of snow on the ground that day and the air was crisp during the service attended by more than two hundred people celebrating the man's life and retelling stories of times shared with Smoke through tears and laughter. Smoke Blanchard was cremated and his remains were scattered up in Big Pine Canyon, California between the fourth and fifth lakes in the Eastern Sierra that he so loved.

== Miscellaneous details ==
- Suffered severe frostbite in his feet in 1955 while climbing.
- In the summer of 1967 he walked across the state of California, from White Mountain Peak to the Pacific Ocean. The hike was to commemorate his thirty years in California and he called it "the best trip I ever made."
- In 1968, he led a group of friends and trekkers on an Anderson Pass walk, which took them through the shadows of Mount Huntington and Denali in Alaska. Less than a year later he completed his almost solo walk of the Oregon and Washington coasts (most of Oregon in 1962, part of Washington in 1963, and the 1968 link up that involved the rest of Oregon and Washington).
- Was a professed Buddhist and had trekked Gaya to Sarnath to visit two of India's Buddhist holy sites in the mid-1960s. he and Laurie Engel made a pilgrimage trip to all five of the most prominent Buddhist holy sites in early 1968. The pair rented two blue bicycles for the trip.
- Was asked to be a member of the 1963 American Everest Expedition. In those days there was no such thing as a The North Face sponsorship deal and Smoke made his living driving a truck. He had to turn down the Everest offer because it would have been impossible on a trucker's salary.
- Caught malaria in Kenya in 1973.
- In the early 1970s was the director of the Palisades School of Mountaineering.
- Wrote an autobiography of his unconventional life. After some prodding he authored Walking Up and Down in the World: Memories of a Mountain Rambler. The book was published in 1984 by Sierra Club Books and is a collection of Mr. Blanchard's tales of old-school climbing, trekking and mountaineering. The book goes into detail concerning his walks, climbs, and bicycle rides in the Sierras, The Western US, Alaska, India, Japan, and Nepal.
- A climbing route on the Middle Palisade, named in honor of Smoke, The Smoke Buttress (IV, 5.9) put up by Steve Porcella and Cameron Burns in 1990.
- Galen Rowell and Doug Robinson developed a hard climbing route on the face of Wheeler Peak in 1972 that they named Smokestack (IV, 5.10a) for Mr. Blanchard.
- Member (Grandfathered) of the American Mountain Guides Association – AMGA
- A direct influence on every major guide currently working in the Sierra or is linked to them by a single degree of separation.
