= Bestor Robinson =

American mountaineer, environmentalist, attorney and inventor

Bestor Robinson (February 9, 1898 – December 9, 1987) was an American mountaineer, environmentalist, attorney and inventor. He was a law partner of Earl Warren, later governor of California and Chief Justice of the Supreme Court of the United States. Robinson was a long-time leader of the Sierra Club.

== Early life ==
Bestor Robinson was the son of Edward Constant Robinson (originally from Oregon) and Sarah T. Merritt (daughter of James Bestor Merritt). He was born and raised in Oakland, California, at 552 Montclair Street. He attended the University of California, Berkeley (1914–1918) and went on to both Boalt School of Law (1919–1921) and then to Harvard Law (1921–1922) where he received his JD. His father was a prominent attorney and later a Superior Court Judge of Alameda County. After law school he joined his father's law firm. Bestor went on to marry Florence Breed, daughter of powerful Republican State Senator Arthur Hastings Breed of Piedmont, CA. They had four children, Ned, Merritt, Warren and Carolyn.

== Mountaineer ==
In 1931, Sierra Club leader Francis P. Farquhar had invited Harvard philosophy professor and Appalachian Mountain Club member Robert L. M. Underhill to come to the Sierra Nevada to teach the latest techniques of roped climbing. Underhill had learned these techniques in the Alps, and had used them earlier that summer in the Tetons and the Canadian Rockies. After the basic course was completed, the more advanced students, including Robinson, Glen Dawson, Jules Eichorn, Norman Clyde, and Lewis Clark traveled south to the Palisades, the most rugged and alpine part of the Sierra Nevada. There, on August 13, 1931, the party completed the first ascent of the last unclimbed 14,000+ foot peak in California, which remained unnamed due to its remote location above the Palisade Glacier. After a challenging ascent to the summit, the climbers were caught in an intense lightning storm, and Eichorn barely escaped electrocution when "a thunderbolt whizzed right by my ear". The mountain was named Thunderbolt Peak to commemorate that close call.

On April 15, 1934, Robinson, Jules Eichorn and Dick Leonard of the Cragmont Climbing Club assembled the most advanced set of climbing gear then in use in North America, much of which they had obtained from Germany, and successfully climbed Higher Cathedral Spire on Cathedral Peak in Yosemite National Park. This was the first major technical ascent in the famous scenic valley that became a mecca of rock climbing.

From October 9 to 12, 1939 a Sierra Club climbing team including Robinson, David Brower, Raffi Bedayn, and John Dyer, completed the first ascent of Shiprock, the erosional remnant of the throat of a volcano with nearly vertical walls on the Navajo reservation in northwestern New Mexico. This climb, rated YDS III, 5.7 A2, was the first in the United States to use expansion bolts for protection.

== Environmentalist and outdoorsman ==
Robinson served as a director of the Sierra Club from 1935 to 1966. He was the president of the Sierra Club from 1946 to 1948. He also served as a member of the Advisory Committee on Conservation to the Secretary of the Interior. In 1942, he served as chairman of the Committee on Uniform Touring Tests of the National Ski Association, now known as the United States Ski and Snowboard Association.

== Attorney ==
Early in his legal career, he was a partner in the firm of Robinson & Robinson. From the 1940s through the 1960s, he was a partner in the law firm of Breed, Robinson & Stewart in Oakland, CA. He specialized in housing and property law.

== Wartime Inventor ==
During the Second World War Robinson served in the United States Army and was assigned to the Office of the Quartermaster general, where he worked on the development of improved equipment and clothing for the army's mountain divisions. He joined a skilled wartime team led by Robert Bates that included mountaineers William P. House, H. Adams Carter, Terris Moore, Bradford Washburn and Australian arctic explorer Hubert Wilkins. On July 27, 1943, he was awarded a U. S. patent for his design of M-1942 (later, M-1942-MOD PW-1-45), a lightweight folding stove for military use. His invention was used in combat by members of the 10th Mountain Division, and was described as an "ingenious little gasoline-powered stove that Bestor Robinson and the Quartermaster General's office had developed". He was promoted to Lt. Colonel in the U.S. Army.
