= Francis P. Farquhar Mountaineering Award =

American sports award

The Francis P. Farquhar Mountaineering Award is given by the Sierra Club, and is named after club leader, historian and mountaineer Francis P. Farquhar. According to the Sierra Club, this award "honors an individual's contribution to mountaineering and enhancement of the Club's prestige in this field". It was first given in 1970.

Award winners

- 1970: Norman Clyde and Allen Steck
- 1971: Richard Leonard
- 1972: Jules Eichorn
- 1973: Glen Dawson
- 1974: Nicholas Clinch and Marjorie Farquhar
- 1977: Galen Rowell
- 1978: John and Ruth Mendenhall
- 1979: William E. Siri
- 1981: Sam Fink
- 1982: Arlene Blum
- 1983: Steve Roper
- 1985: Richard Hechtel
- 1987: Lotte Kramer
- 1988: Gordon Benner
- 1994: Randy Danta and Doug Mantle
- 2001: Andrew J. Smatko
- 2003: Barbara Lilley
- 2005: Gerry Roach
- 2010: Greg Vernon
- 2011: Royal Robbins
- 2012: Tina Bowman
- 2013: R. J. Secor
