= East Face =

East Face may refer to:

- East Face (Mount Whitney), California, United States
- Kangshung Face, of Mount Everest
