= Mount Winchell =

Mountain in the American state of California

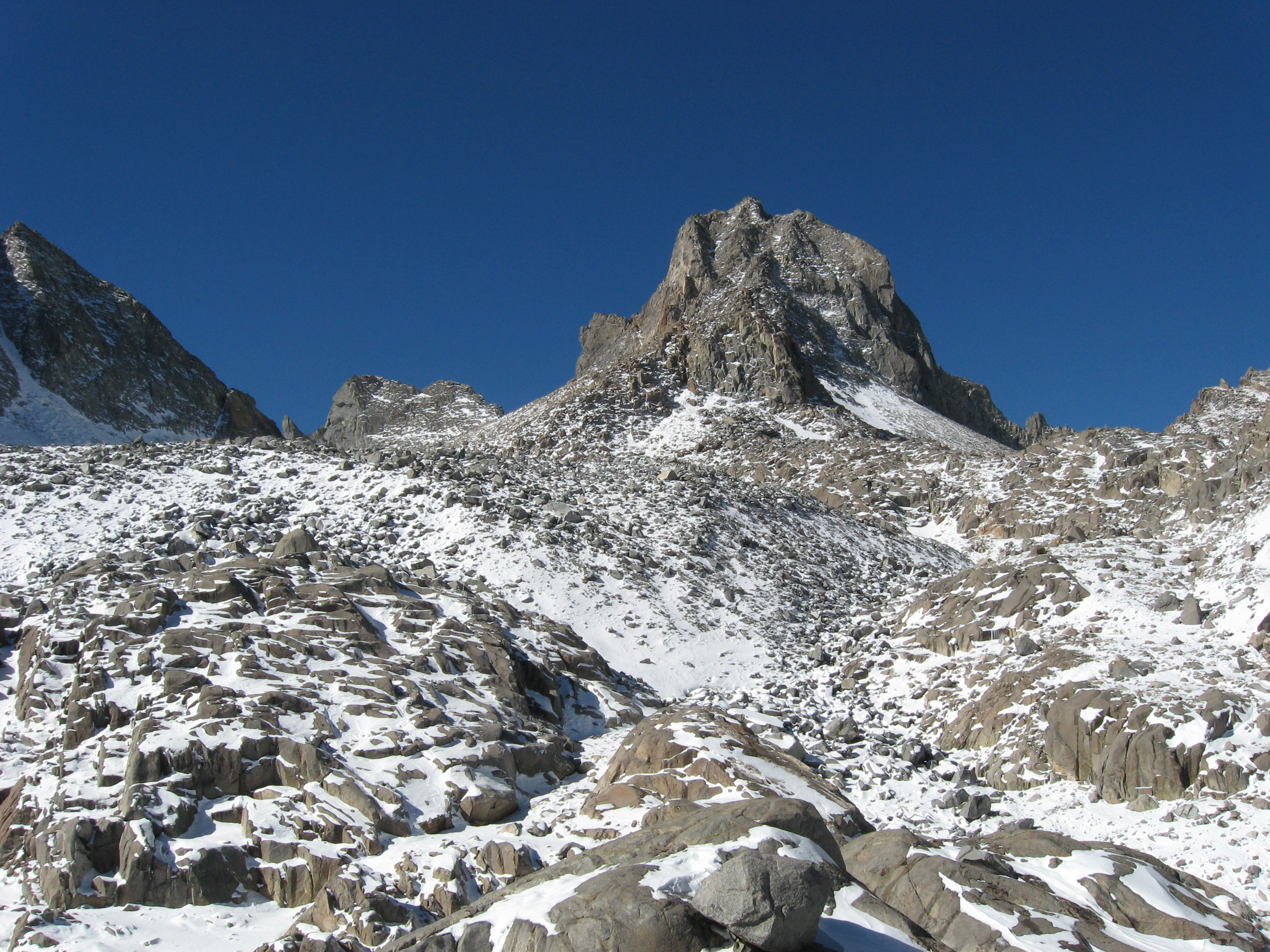
- Mount Winchell's East Arête route, October 2007.

Highest point
- Elevation: 13,781 ft (4,200 m) NAVD 88
- Prominence: 655 ft (200 m)
- Parent peak: Mount Agassiz
- Listing: Sierra Peaks Section
- Coordinates: 37°06′16″N 118°31′33″W

Geography
- Location within California Location within the United States
- Location: Fresno and Inyo counties, California, U.S.
- Parent range: Sierra Nevada
- Topo map: USGS North Palisade

Climbing
- First ascent: June 10, 1923 by Harvey C. Mansfield, John M. Newell, and Windsor B. Putnam
- Easiest route: East Arête, class 3 scramble

Mount Winchell, a thirteener, is among the thirty highest peaks of California. It is in the Palisades region of the Sierra Nevada, on the Sierra Crest between Mount Agassiz and Thunderbolt Peak.

== Geography ==
The Inyo-Kern County line follows Winchell's northwest-southeast ridges. Hydrologically, this same boundary divides the Big Pine Creek drainage from Dusy Basin, part of the Kings River's headwaters. Its west slopes fall within Kings Canyon National Park, while its east slopes are in the John Muir Wilderness of the Inyo National Forest.

== History ==
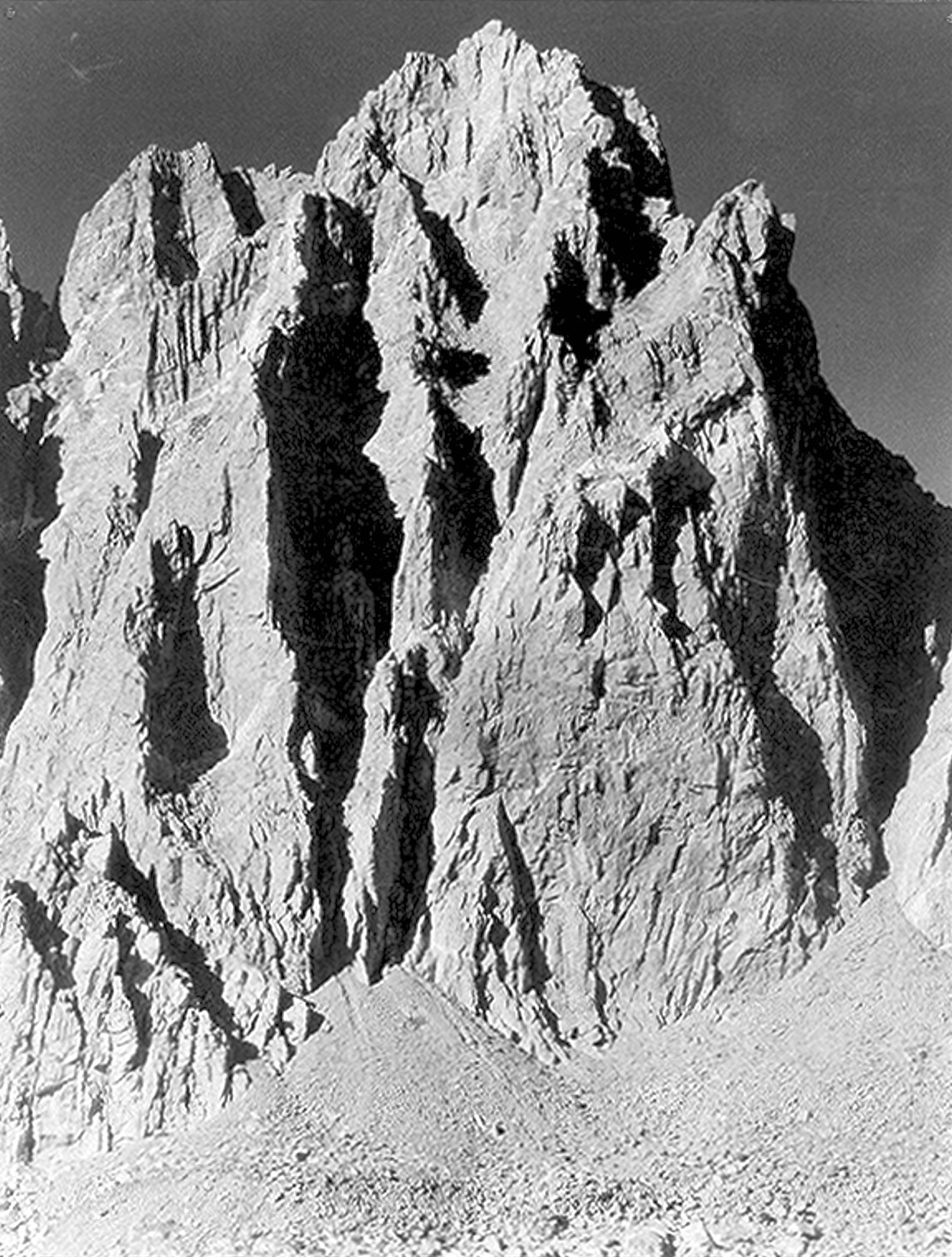
"Mt. Winchell" by Ansel Adams, circa 1930s.

Two mountain peaks in the vicinity were christened Mount Winchell during the 1870s, but neither of them were present day Mount Winchell. The United States Geological Survey applied the name to the present peak. The name's original application was made by Elisha Winchell for his cousin, Alexander Witchell, who was a founding member of the Geological Society of America.

The first recorded climb of Mount Winchell was by Harvey C. Mansfield, Sr., John M. Newell, and Windsor B. Putnam, in June 1923. Their route, a class 3 scramble up the east arête, is the least technical route. The first known winter climb by Norman Clyde, Morgan Harris, and David Brower used this same route in January 1938.

== See also ==
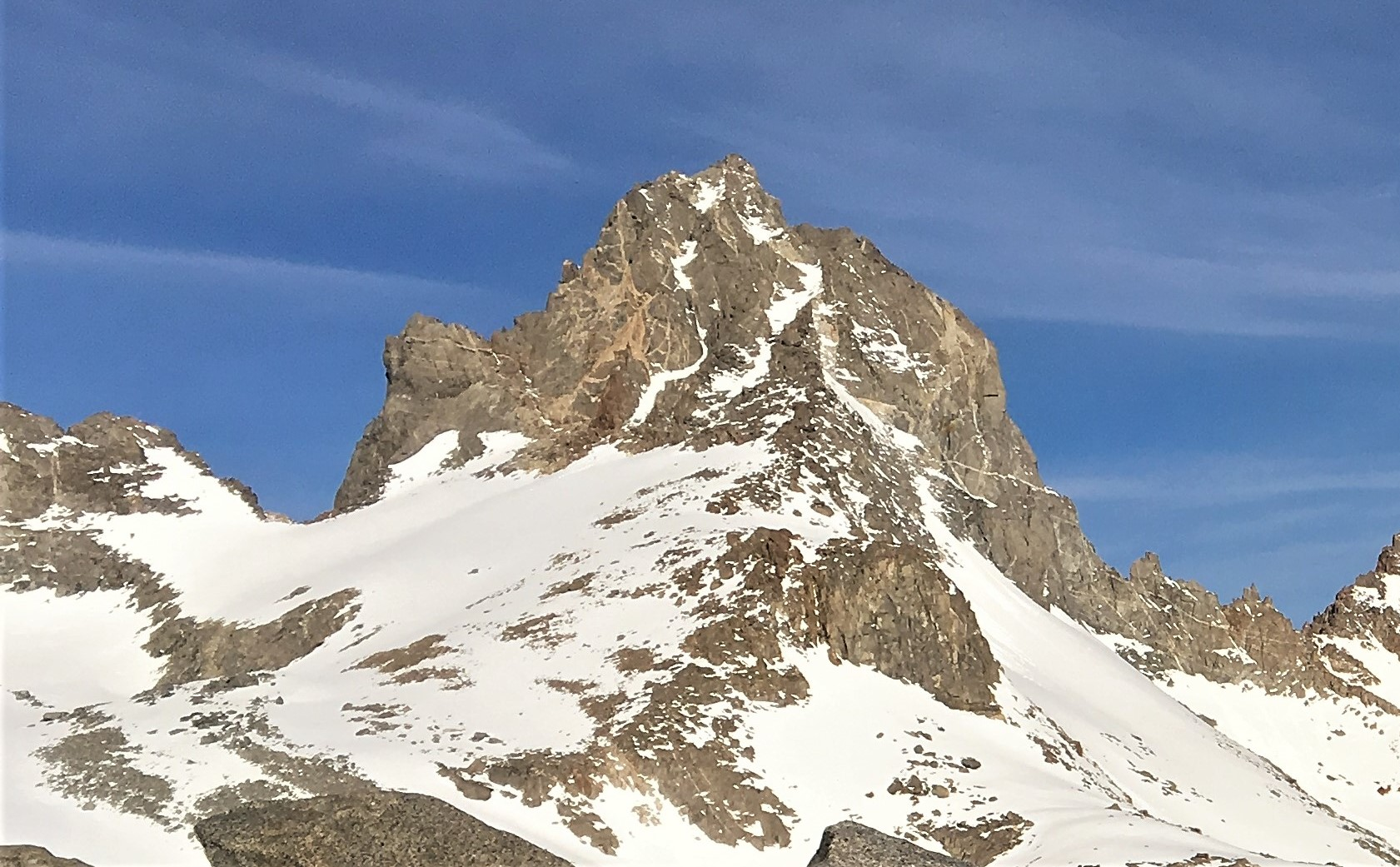
Mt. Winchell

- Mountain peaks of California
- Palisades of the Sierra Nevada
- Thirteener
