= Finger Peaks =

Mountain in the state of California

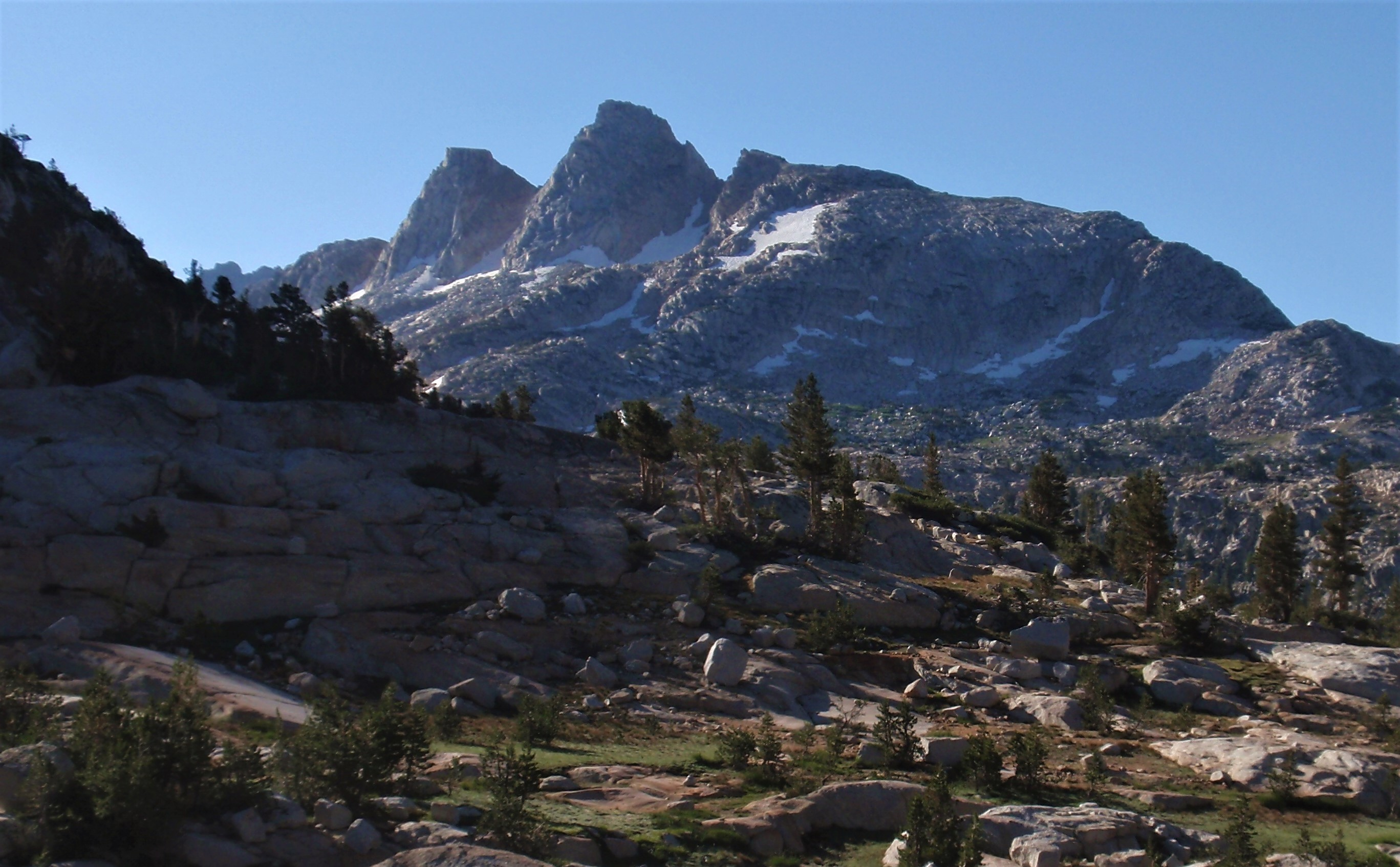
- Northwest aspect

Highest point
- Elevation: 11,498 ft (3,505 m)
- Prominence: 818 ft (249 m)
- Parent peak: Sawtooth Ridge (11,780 ft)
- Isolation: 1.39 mi (2.24 km)
- Coordinates: 38°05′14″N 119°24′26″W

Geography
- Location within California Location within the United States
- Location: Yosemite National Park; Tuolumne County, California, U.S.
- Parent range: Sierra Nevada
- Topo map: USGS Matterhorn Peak

Geology
- Rock age: Cretaceous
- Mountain type: Fault block
- Rock type: Granodiorite

Climbing
- First ascent: 1931
- Easiest route: class 4 scrambling

Finger Peaks is a granitic mountain summit with an elevation of 11,498 feet (3,505 m) located in the Sierra Nevada mountain range, in northern California, United States. The three peaks are situated in Yosemite National Park and Tuolumne County. The landform is set immediately west of Burro Pass, 1.5 mile south of Eocene Peak, and 1.4 mile southwest of Matterhorn Peak. Topographic relief is significant as the summit rises 1,700 feet (520 meters) above Piute Creek in one-half mile. The first ascent of the summit was made July 19, 1931, by Jules Eichorn, Glen Dawson, and Walter Brem. This landform's toponym has been in publications since at least 1925, and was officially adopted by the U.S. Board on Geographic Names in 1932.

== Climate ==
According to the Köppen climate classification system, Finger Peaks is located in an alpine climate zone. Most weather fronts originate in the Pacific Ocean, and travel east toward the Sierra Nevada mountains. As fronts approach, they are forced upward by the peaks (orographic lift), causing moisture in the form of rain or snowfall to drop onto the range. Precipitation runoff from this landform drains north into Piute Creek which is a tributary of the Tuolumne River, and south into Matterhorn Creek which is also part of the Tuolumne drainage basin.

== See also ==
- Geology of the Yosemite area
- Tuolumne Intrusive Suite

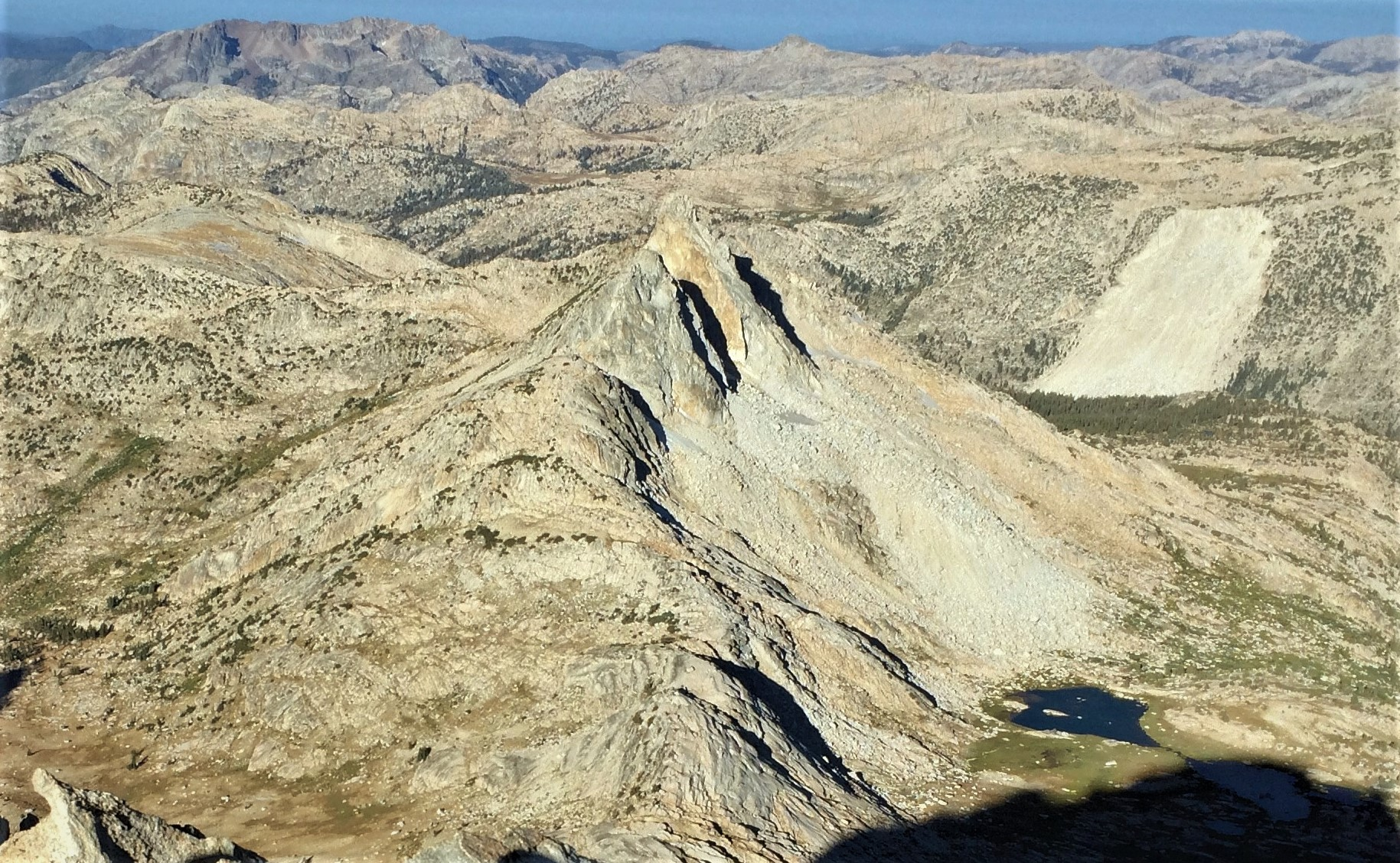
Finger Peaks seen from Matterhorn Peak
