= Miriam O'Brien Underhill =

American mountain climber (1898-1976)

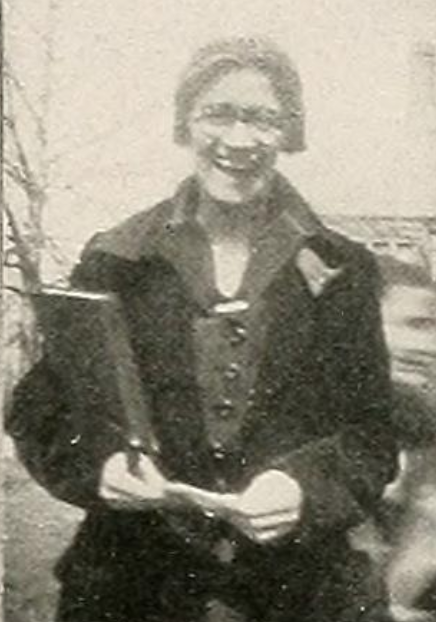
- Miriam O'Brien, from the 1920 yearbook of Bryn Mawr College
- Born: Miriam Eliot O'Brien; July 22, 1898, Forest Glen, Maryland
- Died: January 7, 1976 (aged 77); Lancaster, New Hampshire
- Education: Johns Hopkins University
- Known for: Mountaineering
- Spouse: Robert L. M. Underhill
- Children: 2

Miriam O'Brien Underhill (July 22, 1898 – January 7, 1976) was an American mountaineer, environmentalist and feminist, best known for the concept of "manless climbing" – organizing all-women's ascents of challenging climbs, mostly in the Alps.

== Early life ==
Miriam Eliot O'Brien was born in Forest Glen, Maryland on July 22, 1898. Her father was a newspaper editor and government official, and her mother was a physician. With her parents, she first visited the Alps in 1914, and completed an introductory climb near Chamonix. She earned a bachelor's degree in mathematics and physics from Bryn Mawr College in 1920, and a master's degree in psychology from the same university in 1921. She visited the Alps during several summers after World War I and dabbled with mountaineering. She studied physics at Johns Hopkins University from 1923 to 1925. She was an active member of the Appalachian Mountain Club her entire adult life. She joined the Ladies' Alpine Club in 1926, was vice-president 1931-1970 and was made an honorary member in 1970.

== Mountaineering ==
Miriam O'Brien began serious rock climbing in the Alps in May 1926, completing a first ascent on Torre Grande in the Dolomites by a route now known as the "Via Miriam" in her honor. She also completed the first ascent of the Aiguille de Roc on August 6, 1927 with Alfred Couttet also known as Couttet Champion and Georges Cachat in the massif of Mont Blanc.

On August 4, 1928 O'Brien, accompanied by Robert L. M. Underhill and guides Armand Charlet and G. Cachat, completed the first ascent of the traverse from the Aiguilles du Diable to Mont Blanc du Tacul in the Alps. This route involves "climbing five outstanding summits over 4000 meters in superb surroundings."

In 1929, she completed a climb of the Aiguille du Grépon with French climber Alice Damesme. This achievement by two women led mountaineer Étienne Bruhl to complain "The Grépon has disappeared. Now that it has been done by two women alone, no self-respecting man can undertake it. A pity, too, because it used to be a very good climb".

On September 3, 1930, she climbed the most difficult route on the Finsteraarhorn, the north-east face, with guides A. and F. Rubi. This peak is the highest in the Bernese Alps. Her climb was the third ascent, and the route had only been climbed twice in the preceding 24 years.

In 1931, she climbed the Mönch and the Jungfrau in the Bernese Alps with Micheline Morin.

In 1932, she completed the first all-women's ascent of the Matterhorn with Alice Damesme.

She married mountaineer and Harvard professor Robert L. M. Underhill in 1932. They had two sons, born in 1936 and 1939. After World War II, she climbed with her husband in the Wind River Range of Wyoming, the Mission, Swan and Beartooth ranges of Montana, and the Sawtooth range of Idaho.

She climbed the Matterhorn for her third and final time in 1952.

She, along with her husband, were charter members of the Four Thousand Footer Club, a section of the Appalachian Mountain Club. The only membership requirement was climbing all 48 four thousand foot peaks of the White Mountains of New Hampshire. They were the first to climb all of those peaks during the winter, completing the quest with their ascent of Mount Jefferson on December 31, 1960. At that time the list consisted of just 46 peaks.

== Writer and editor ==
She wrote an essay titled Manless Alpine Climbing: The First Woman to Scale the Grépon, the Matterhorn and Other Famous Peaks Without Masculine Support, which was published by the National Geographic Society in 1934. This essay, or excerpts from it, has been republished in several compendia of mountaineering literature. In this essay, she explained her mountaineering philosophy this way: "Very early, I realized that the person who invariably climbs behind a good leader...may never really learn mountaineering at all and in any case enjoys only part of the varied delights and rewards of climbing." She went on to say, "I did realize that if women were really to lead, that is, to take the entire responsibility for the climb, there couldn't be any man at all in the party."

Her autobiography, Give Me the Hills, was published in London by Methuen Publishing in 1956. It was republished in the United States in 1971.

She edited Appalachia, the journal of the Appalachian Mountain Club, from 1956 - 1961, and also in 1968.

== Legacy ==
The Robert and Miriam Underhill Award is given annually by the American Alpine Club "to a person who, in the opinion of the selection committee, has demonstrated the highest level of skill in the mountaineering arts and who, through the application of this skill, courage, and perseverance, has achieved outstanding success in the various fields of mountaineering endeavor." In 2022, the American Alpine Club changed the name of the award to the Pinnacle award in light of Robert Underhill’s anti-Semitic and racist views. There is no evidence that Miriam held the views of her husband.

Miriam Peak in the Wind River Range of Wyoming is named after her.
