= Richard M. Leonard =

American environmentalist

- Leonard in 1965
- Born: October 22, 1908; Elyria, Ohio
- Died: July 31, 1993 (aged 84); Berkeley, California
- Education: University of California, Berkeley (B.A., J.D)
- Occupations: Rock climber, environmentalist, attorney

Richard Manning Leonard (October 22, 1908 – July 31, 1993) was an American rock climber, environmentalist and attorney. He served as president of the Sierra Club and the Save the Redwoods League, and was active in the Wilderness Society and the American Alpine Club. Leonard was born in Elyria, Ohio and graduated from the University of California, Berkeley and also received his Doctor of Jurisprudence degree from the University of California.

On March 13, 1932, Leonard formed the Cragmont Climbing Club in Berkeley, California with Jules Eichorn, Bestor Robinson and several others. Leonard took a systematic, experimental approach to rock climbing safety and technology, repeatedly testing climber falls and belaying techniques under carefully controlled conditions. Steve Roper called Leonard "the father of California rock climbing". In November, 1932, the Cragmont Climbing Club merged with the Sierra Club's new Rock Climbing Section.

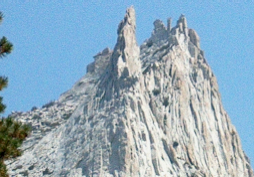
Eichorn Pinnacle on Cathedral Peak, which Leonard was one of the first to ascend.

In 1934, Leonard, along with Bestor Robinson and Jules Eichorn completed the first ascent of the Eichorn Pinnacle on Cathedral Peak, near Tuolumne Meadows in Yosemite National Park.

In 1934, Leonard, Eichorn and Robinson assembled the most advanced set of climbing gear then in use in North America, much of which they had obtained from Germany, and successfully climbed Higher Cathedral Spire in Yosemite Valley. This was the first major technical ascent in the famous scenic valley that became a mecca of rock climbing. The following year (1935), Leonard, Morgan Harris, and Jack Riegelhuth made the first climbing ascent of Washington Column by a route they called the Piton Traverse. Climbing historian Steve Roper later wrote that the precise line of the original route was no longer known.

During the Second World War Leonard served in the United States Army and was assigned to the Office of the Quartermaster general along with Bestor Robinson, where they worked on the development of improved equipment and clothing for the army's mountain divisions. They joined a skilled wartime team led by Robert Bates that included mountaineers William P. House, H. Adams Carter, Terris Moore, Bradford Washburn and Australian arctic explorer Hubert Wilkins. During the second half of the War, Leonard fought the Japanese in Burma. He was awarded the Bronze Star.

On April 20, 1948, Leonard became a founding director and general counsel for Varian Associates, a pioneering scientific instrument company in what later became known as Silicon Valley.

Leonard served on the board of directors of the Sierra Club from 1938 to 1972. He served as president of the Sierra Club from 1953 to 1955.
