= Thunderbolt Peak =

Mountain in the American state of California

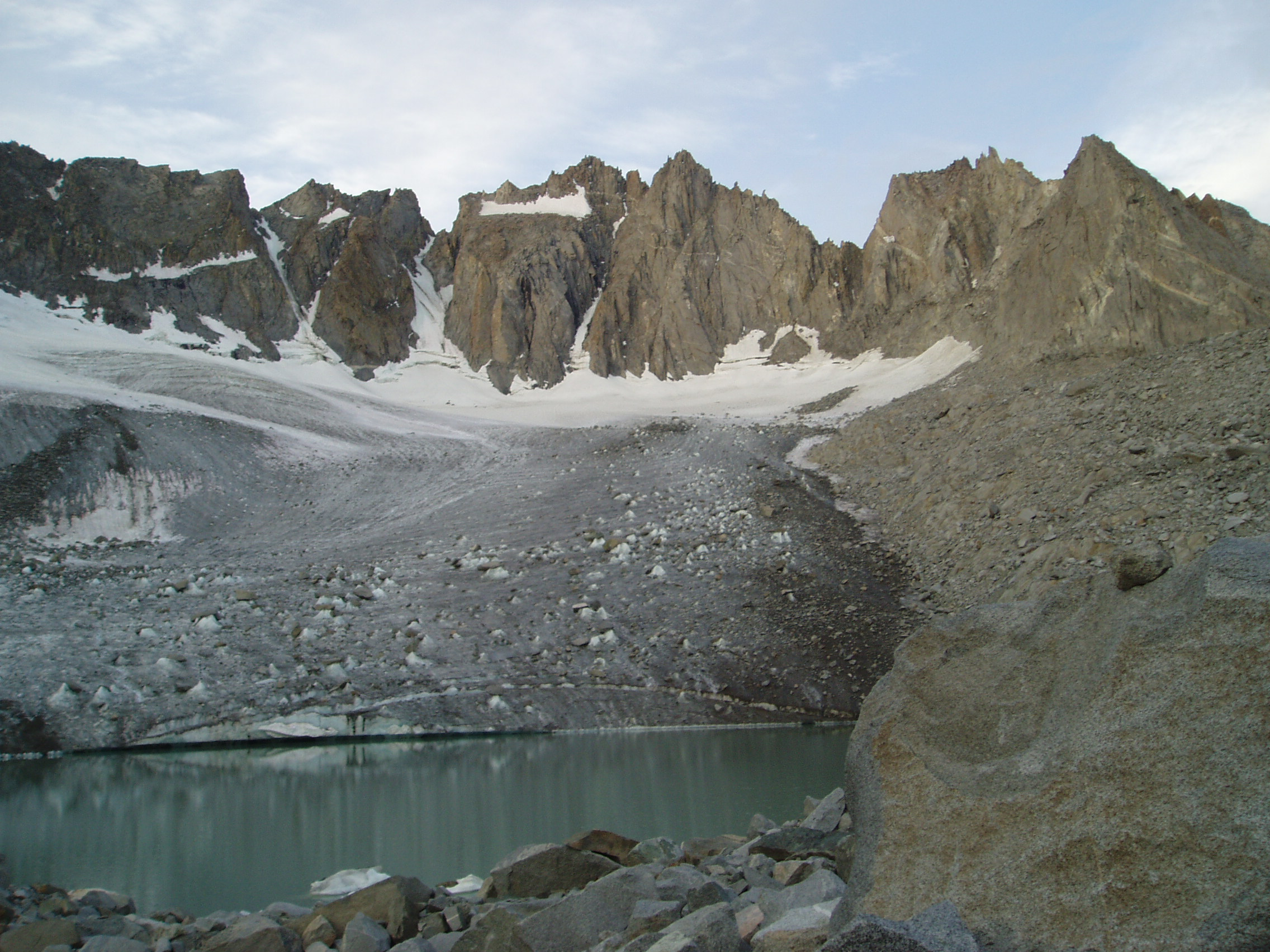
- Polemonium, North Palisade, Starlight, Thunderbolt Peaks

Highest point
- Elevation: 14,009 ft (4,270 m) NAVD 88
- Prominence: 203 ft (62 m)
- Parent peak: North Palisade
- Listing: SPS Mountaineers peak; Western Climbers Star peak
- Coordinates: 37°05′53″N 118°31′03″W

Geography
- Location within California
- Location: Fresno and Inyo counties, California, U.S.
- Parent range: Sierra Nevada
- Topo map: USGS North Palisade

Climbing
- First ascent: August 13, 1931 by Robert Underhill, Norman Clyde, Bestor Robinson, Francis Farbquar, Glen Dawson, Lewis Clark and Jules Eichorn
- Easiest route: Technical climb, class 4, by several routes

Thunderbolt Peak is a peak in the Palisades group located in the Sierra Nevada of California. It rises to 14,009 feet (4,270 m) and could be considered the thirteenth-highest peak in the state, but since the peak has less than 300 feet (91 m) of prominence it is usually considered a subsidiary peak of North Palisade. But if it is considered a separate mountain peak, Thunderbolt Peak is the northernmost fourteener in the Sierra Nevada.

The first ascent was attempted by a party of very well-known climbers. During the climb, a lightning bolt struck very close to Jules Eichorn, breaking his concentration. The mountain was named in commemoration of this event.

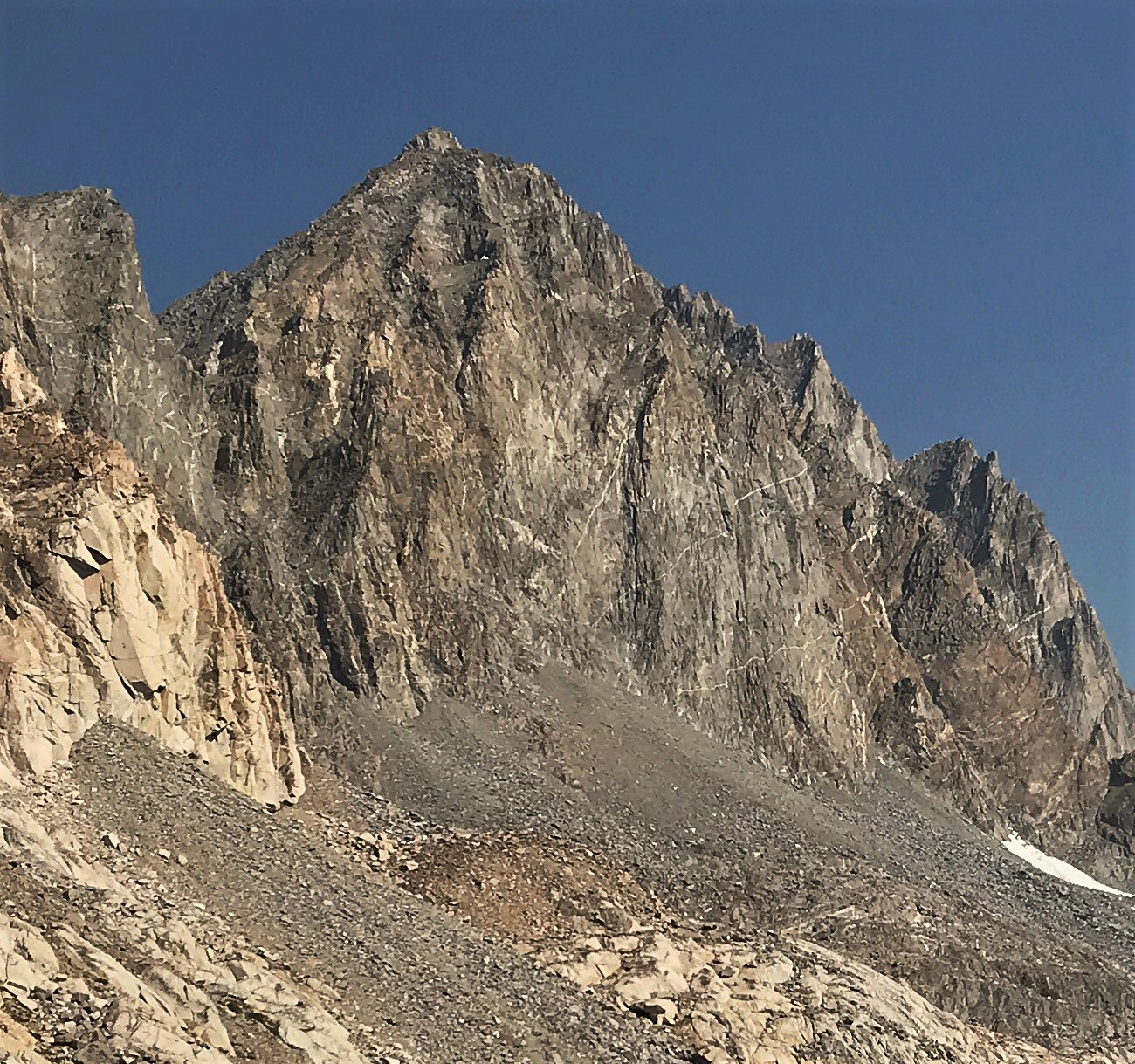
Thunderbolt Peak, west aspect

== See also ==
- The Palisades of the Sierra Nevada
- Beinn a' Bheithir (A Scottish hill whose Gaelic name translates as Thunderbolt Peak)
