= East Face (Mount Whitney) =

East Face of Mount Whitney
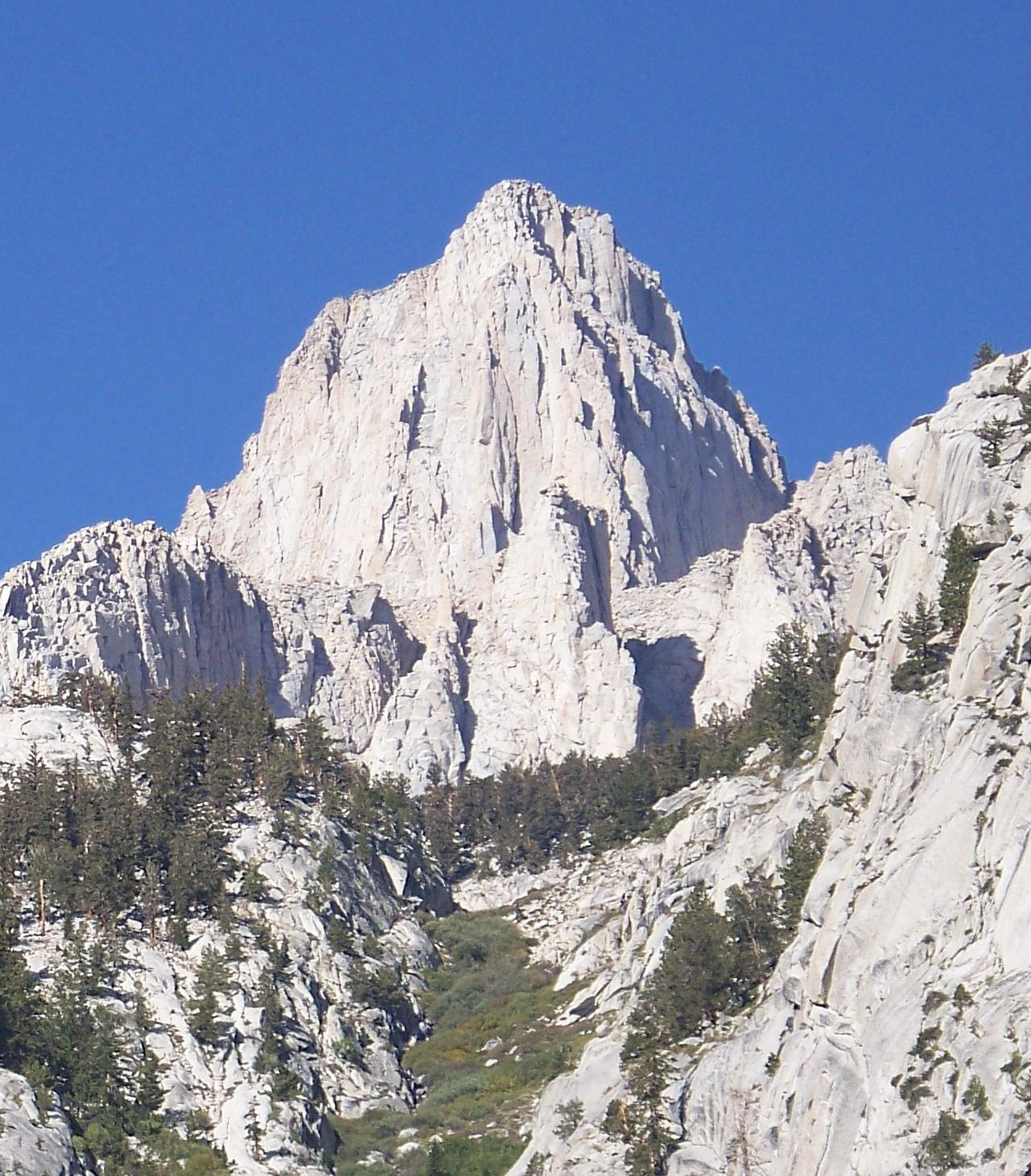
- East Face of Mount Whitney seen from the Whitney Portal.
- Location: Sierra Nevada, California, United States
- Coordinates: 36.57860°N 118.293°W
- Climbing area: Mount Whitney
- Route type: Trad/Alpine
- Vertical gain: 1,000 feet
- Pitches: 13
- Technical grade: 5.7
- NCCS grade: III
- First ascent: Robert L. M. Underhill, Glen Dawson, Jules Eichorn, & Norman Clyde, 1931.

The East Face of Mount Whitney is a technical alpine rock climbing route and is featured in Fifty Classic Climbs of North America. Mount Whitney is the highest peak in the contiguous United States.

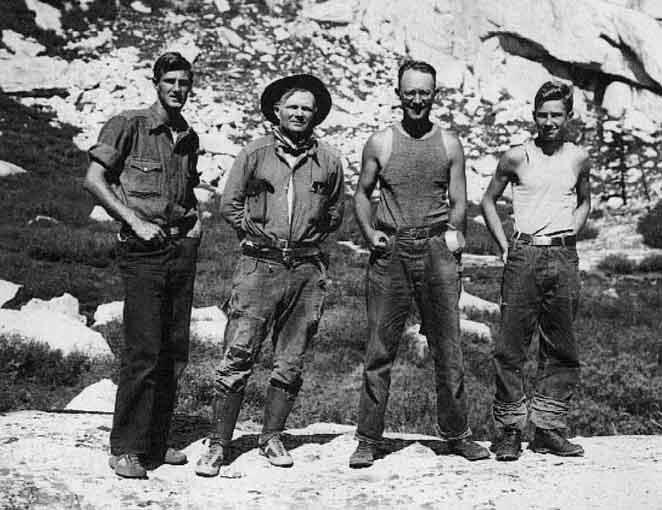
Photo of Jules Eichorn, Norman Clyde, Robert L. M. Underhill and Glen Dawson taken the day after the first ascent.

The first ascent was on August 16, 1931, by Robert L. M. Underhill of the Appalachian Mountain Club, and Sierra Club climbers Norman Clyde, Jules Eichorn, and Glen Dawson. By the standards of climbing in California at that time, the route was considered very exposed, especially the famous Fresh Air Traverse. Steve Roper called this route "one of the classic routes of the Sierra, partly because of its spectacular location and partly because it was the first really big wall to be climbed in the range". Porcella & Burns wrote that "the climb heralded a new standard of technical competence in Californian rock climbing". Underhill himself commented that "the beauty of the climb lies chiefly in its unexpected possibility, up the apparent precipice, and in the intimate contact it affords with the features that lend Mount Whitney its real impressiveness".
