= Norman Clyde =

American mountain climber (1885–1972)

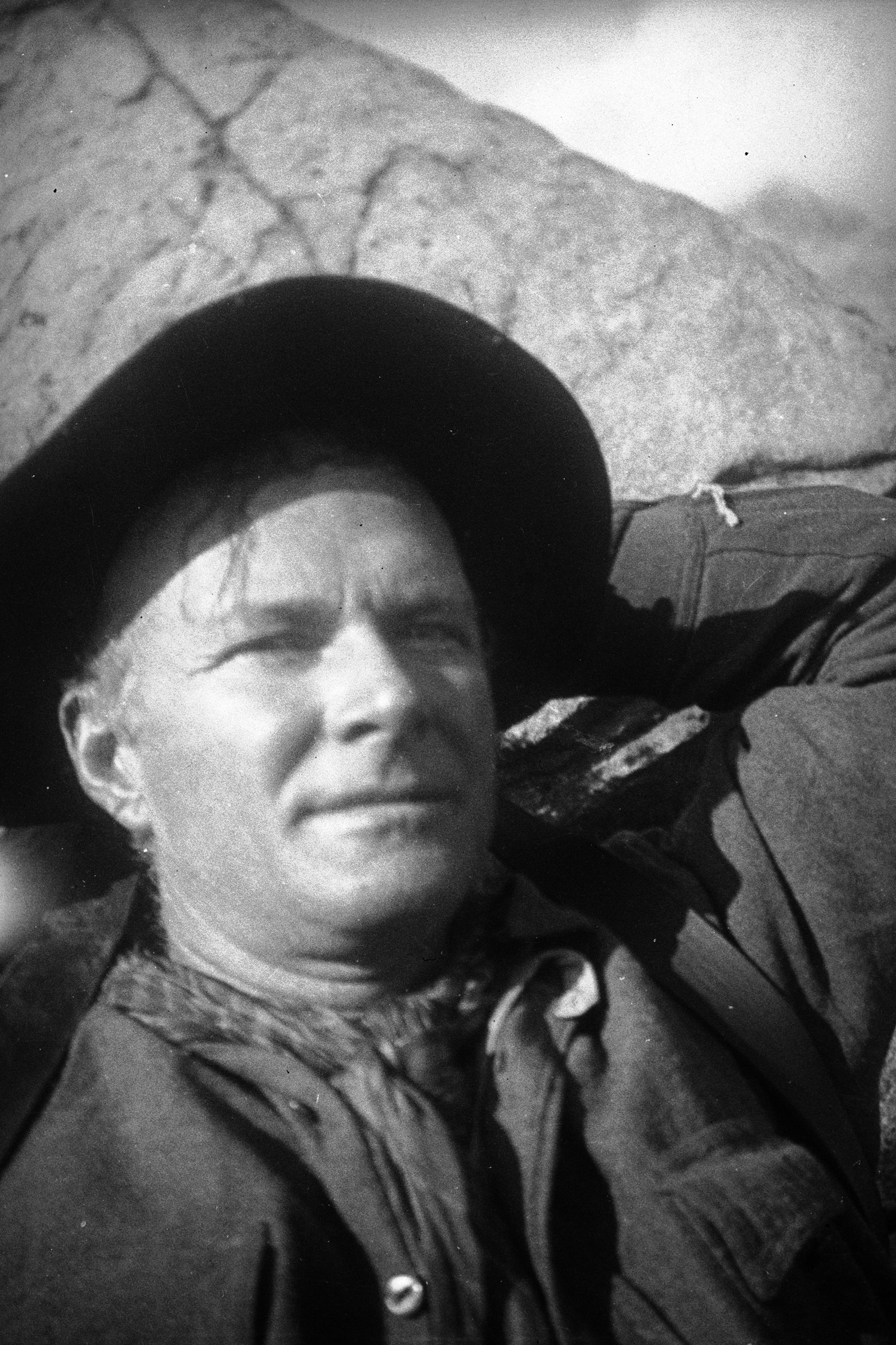
- Norman Clyde in the Sierra Nevada in 1931
- Born: April 8, 1885; Philadelphia, Pennsylvania
- Died: December 23, 1972 (aged 87); Big Pine, California
- Resting place: Norman Clyde Peak; 37°04′30″N 118°28′22″W
- Known for: Mountaineering first ascents in the Sierra Nevada

Norman Clyde (April 8, 1885 – December 23, 1972) was a mountaineer, mountain guide, freelance writer, nature photographer, and self-trained naturalist. He is well known for achieving over 130 first ascents, many in California's Sierra Nevada and Montana's Glacier National Park. He also set a speed climbing record on California's Mount Shasta in 1923. The Bancroft Library at the University of California, Berkeley has 1467 articles written by Clyde in its archives.

== Biography ==
=== Early life, marriage and work ===
Clyde was born in Philadelphia, the son of a Reformed Presbyterian minister. His parents were Charles and Isabel Purvis Clyde. He attended Geneva College graduating in the Classics in June 1909. After teaching at several rural schools, including schools in Fargo, North Dakota and Mount Pleasant, Utah, he enrolled at the University of California, Berkeley in 1911. After two years of graduate work he returned to teaching, mostly in northern California, including the towns of McCloud and Weaverville. He taught history, science, and Latin. He continued graduate studies at the University of California, Berkeley in 1923–24.

On June 15, 1915, Norman Clyde married Winifred May Bolster in Pasadena, California. She was a nurse at a tuberculosis hospital and contracted the disease herself at approximately the time of their marriage. After four years of suffering from the disease she died at age 28 in 1919. His wife's death appears to have profoundly affected him, as he moved to the Eastern Sierra to spend much of his latter life alone in the mountains.

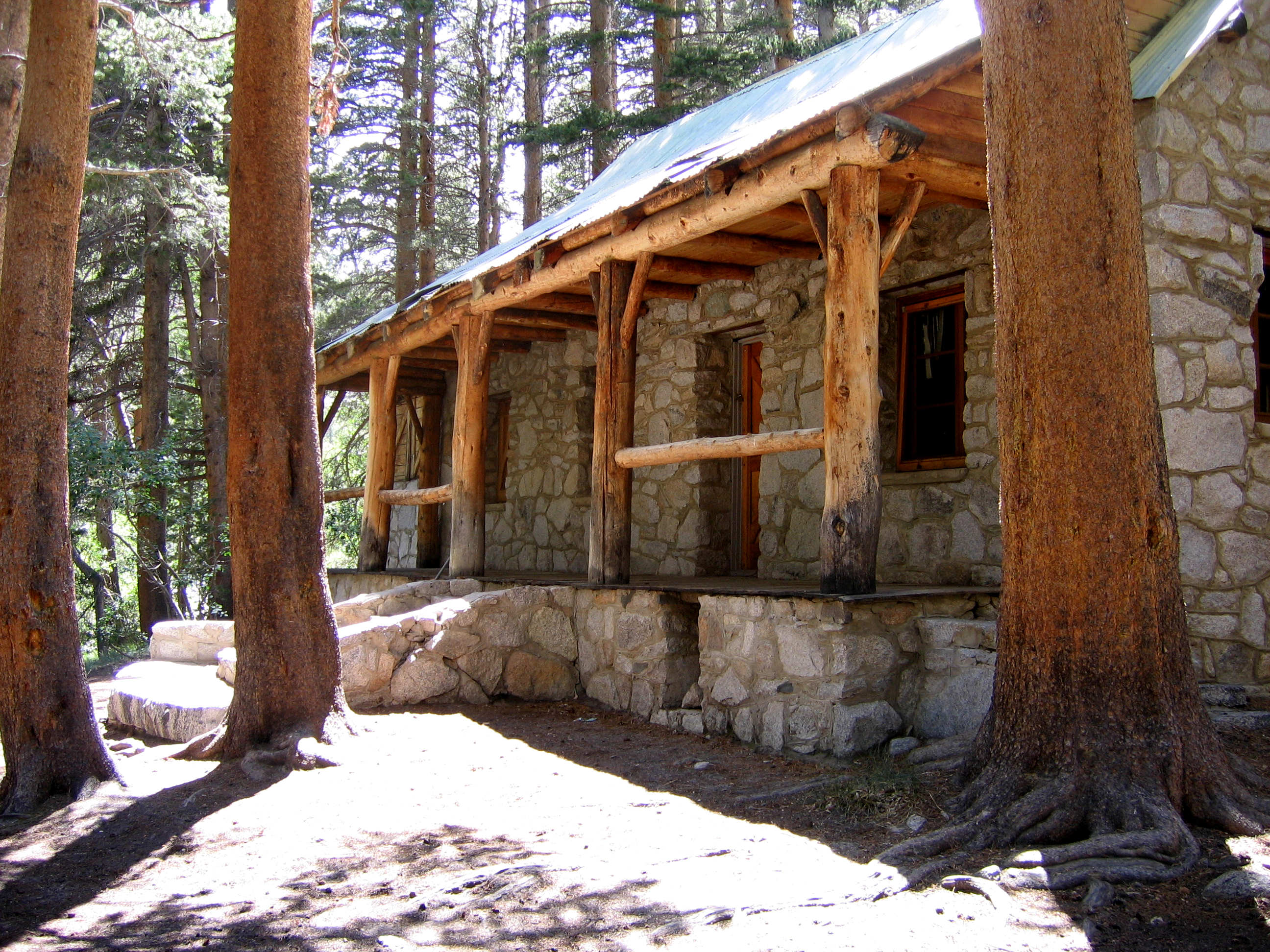
The Chaney cabin where Clyde was winter caretaker

He became principal of the high school in Independence, California in 1924, but resigned in 1928. He admitted firing a pistol during a confrontation with some students who allegedly came to vandalize the school on Halloween night. One bullet hit the side of a car carrying eight high school students; there were no injuries. Clyde said that considerable damage had been done to the school grounds the previous Halloween. He had been issued a license to carry a concealed firearm on February 2, 1928. The episode marked the end of his career as a schoolteacher and principal, as he resigned in exchange for an agreement by the District Attorney not to press charges.

Subsequently, he spent his winters as the caretaker of the local lodges, including Glacier Lodge on Big Pine Creek, and Lon Chaney Cabin, a fishing cabin that belonged to Lon Chaney, Sr. He earned some sporadic income as a mountain guide and freelance writer.

=== Life in the mountains ===
Clyde began climbing in the Sierra Nevada in 1910, when he visited Yosemite and Sequoia National Parks, writing to his mother that "I climbed the highest mountains in the region". He also visited McCloud, near Mount Shasta, that summer. He began a regimented program of mountaineering in the Sierra Nevada in 1914, including the first of his first ascents. He joined the Sierra Club in 1914. He first climbed Mount Shasta in 1916, and climbed that peak a total of twelve times. While living in Southern California during his wife's illness, he climbed Mount San Jacinto in 1917. Following his wife's death in 1919, he climbed extensively in the Kings-Kern Divide region of the southern Sierra.

In 1920, Clyde journeyed with a Sierra Club group from Yosemite Valley to the Evolution Basin, completing many climbs along the way. He set a speed climbing record on Mount Shasta in 1923, ascending from Horse Camp at approximately 8,000 feet (2,400 m) to the summit at 14,162 feet (4,317 m) in 3 hours and 17 minutes. That year, he also spent 36 days in Glacier National Park, Montana, where he climbed 36 mountains, including 11 first ascents, one of which bears his name (Clyde Peak). The National Park Service issued a press release praising his accomplishments in Glacier National Park. He returned to climb in Glacier National Park in 1924 and 1937.

In 1925, he completed 53 climbs in the Sierra Nevada, and told Francis Farquhar that "I sometimes think I climbed enough peaks this summer to render me a candidate for a padded cell — at least some people look at the matter in that way. However, I get a lot of enjoyment from this rather strenuous form of diversion." In 1926, he climbed in Yellowstone National Park, Grand Teton National Park, the Beartooth Mountains and Absaroka Range of Montana, and the Sawtooth Range of Idaho. He made several additional first ascents in California that year.

In 1928, he was a leader of the High Trip to the Canadian Rockies organized by the Sierra Club, the Mazamas of Oregon, and The Mountaineers of the State of Washington. During this trip, he encountered professional mountain guides, and probably decided on this as his own career path. He spent six weeks traversing the San Gabriels of Southern California, probably in 1929. In 1930, he wrote an article describing his trip from the summit of Mount Whitney to the lowest point in Death Valley between sunrise and sunset.

Clyde's first published works appeared as a series of articles entitled "Close Ups of the High Sierra" in 1928, in the Automobile Club of Southern California's magazine, Touring Topics, and were later republished as a perfect-bound edition in 1962 by La Siesta Press (Glendale, California), edited by Walt Wheelock.

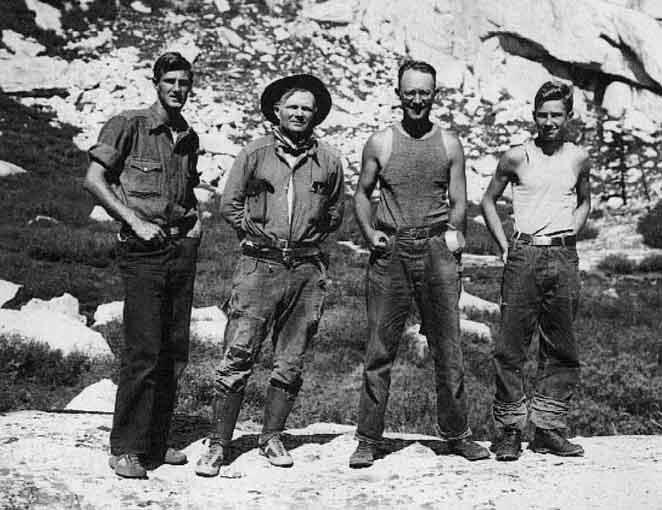
Photo of Jules Eichorn, Norman Clyde, Robert L. M. Underhill and Glen Dawson taken the day after the first ascent of the East Face of Mount Whitney

1931 was a seminal year in the history of mountaineering in the Sierra Nevada, and Norman Clyde was in the thick of it. Sierra Club leader Francis P. Farquhar invited Harvard philosophy professor and Appalachian Mountain Club member Robert L. M. Underhill to come to the Sierra Nevada to teach the latest techniques of roped climbing. Underhill had learned these techniques in the Alps, and had practiced them himself earlier that summer in the Tetons and the Canadian Rockies. After some young climbers were instructed in the techniques, a group including Clyde, Jules Eichorn, Lewis Clark, Bestor Robinson and Glen Dawson traveled south to the Palisades, the most rugged and alpine part of the Sierra Nevada. There, on August 13, 1931, the party completed the first ascent of the last unclimbed 14,000+ foot peak in California, which remained unnamed due to its remote location above the Palisade Glaciers. After a challenging ascent to the summit, the climbers were caught in an intense lightning storm, and Eichorn barely escaped electrocution when "a thunderbolt whizzed right by my ear". The mountain was named Thunderbolt Peak to commemorate that close call.

Three days later on August 16, Eichorn, Clyde, Underhill and Dawson completed the first ascent of the East Face of Mount Whitney, the highest peak in the contiguous United States. The route was extremely exposed, especially the famous Fresh Air Traverse. Steve Roper called this route "one of the classic routes of the Sierra, partly because of its spectacular location and partly because it was the first really big wall to be climbed in the range." Porcella & Burns wrote that "the climb heralded a new standard of technical competence in Californian rock climbing…" These events led to a lifelong friendship between Clyde and Jules Eichorn.

In 1932, he climbed El Picacho del Diablo in Baja California, Mexico, and climbed it again in 1937. He met David Brower in the Sierra Nevada in 1933, and in 1934 spent time with Brower and Hervey Voge as the younger men bagged 32 first ascents in ten weeks traveling through the High Sierra. From June 23–26, the trio climbed 10 of the 12 major pinnacles of the Devils Crags.

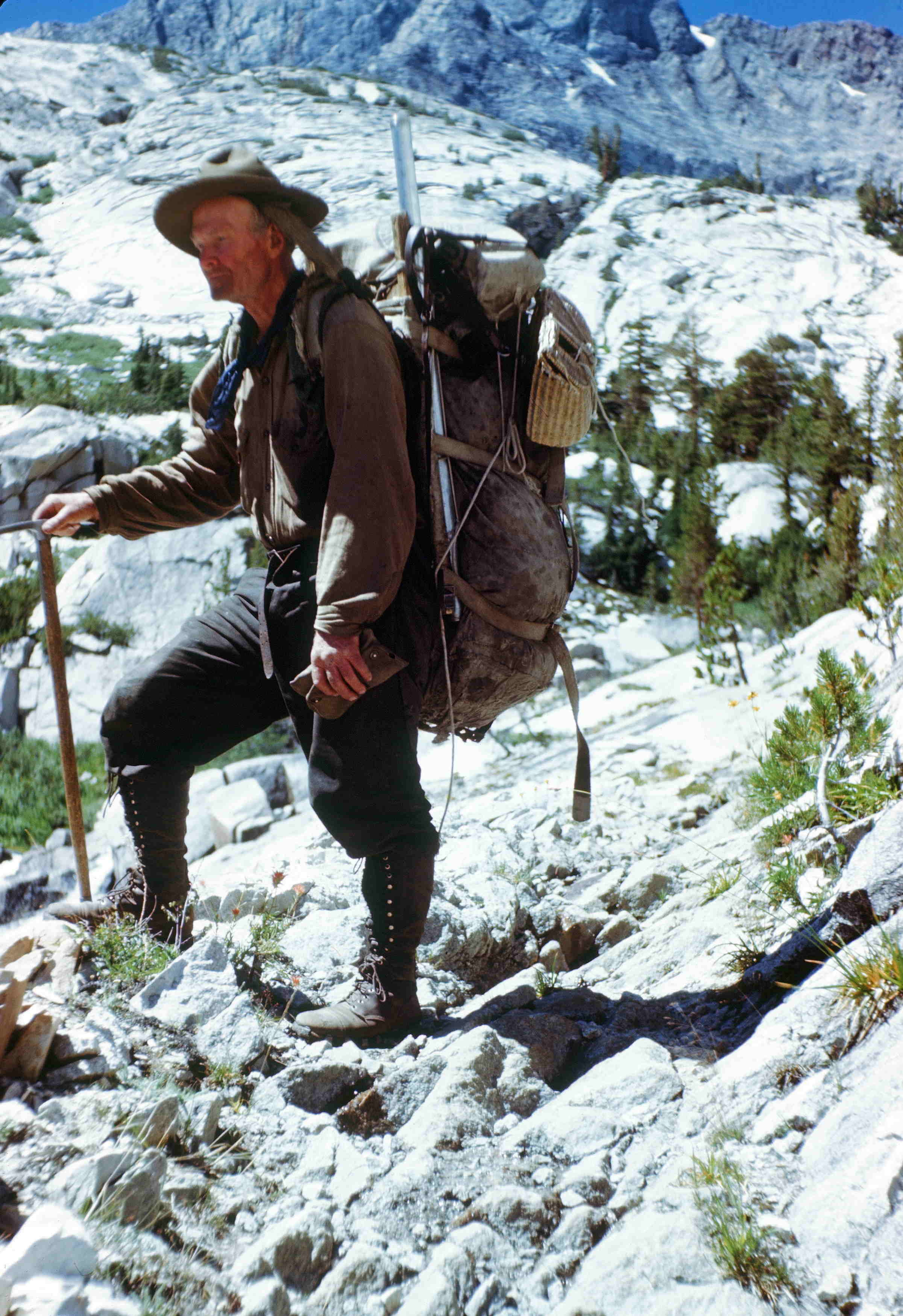
Norman Clyde in Le Conte Canyon 1945

He served as climbing leader on many High Trips sponsored by the Sierra Club and became known as "the pack that walks like a man" because of the huge backpacks he carried. In addition to as many as five cameras, he carried a hammer and cobbler's anvil in order to make field repairs to client's boots. In 1931, Underhill wrote that Clyde's backpack was an "especially picturesque enormity of skyscraper architecture". Clyde was also well known for wearing a campaign hat.

Clyde led or participated in many mountain rescues and is credited with saving a number of lives. He also helped in many recoveries of dead climbers, such as 18-year-old Howard Lamel, killed in a fall on Mount Whitney in 1930. He is remembered for discovering Pete Starr's body in the Minarets, in 1933, after all other searchers gave up. Clyde later returned to the site with Jules Eichorn, and they buried Starr's body where Clyde had found it on Michael Minaret.

=== Later life and death ===
Norman Clyde still guided parties into the Sierra into the 1960s, when he was in his seventies. In the 1950s and 1960s, he lived by himself at the old Baker ranch-house on Baker Creek near Big Pine.

Clyde suffered from a series of ailments in his final decade. In 1962, he suffered a mastoid infection in his ear, which made it painful to experience high altitudes. In 1969, his cancerous left eye was removed at Cottage Hospital in Santa Barbara. Around 1970, Clyde permanently relocated to the Inyo County Sanatorium in Big Pine due to his advancing age, health issues (including an enlarged heart and hernia), and lack of savings.

Norman Clyde died at the Inyo County Sanatorium in Big Pine on December 23, 1972 at 12:45am at the age of 87. The cause of death was "metastatic melanoma – primary in eye." Clyde's death certificate erroneously reported that his remains had been interred at a Tonopah, Nevada cemetery. In actuality, Clyde was cremated and his ashes were scattered from the peak that would eventually be known as Norman Clyde Peak (near Middle Palisade).

Walt Wheelock, in an introduction to an updated edition of Clyde's Close Ups of the High Sierra, wrote about scattering the mountaineer's ashes: "a small party of mountaineers, namely Jules Eichorn, Smoke Blanchard with son Bob, and Nort Benner, quietly carried Clyde's ashes up Big Pine Creek to the peak that Norman Clyde looked out upon from his ranch window in Baker Creek. It was on the jagged crest of that peak, which would later bear his name, that Clyde's ashes were scattered in full view of the magnificent Sierra Nevada."

== Legacy ==
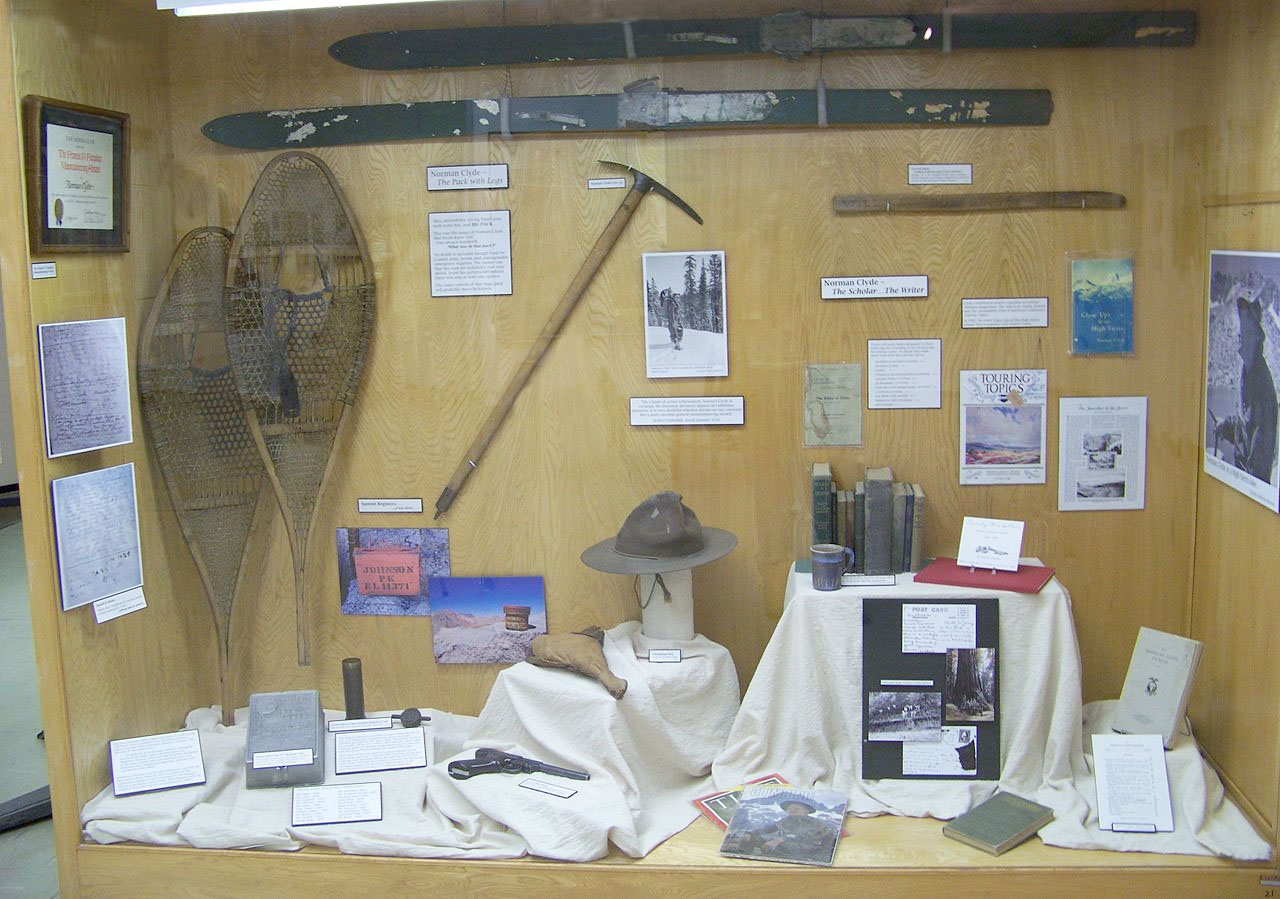
The Norman Clyde exhibit at the Eastern California Museum in Independence, California

Norman Clyde received an honorary Doctor of Science degree from his alma mater, Geneva College, in 1939. He received the college's Distinguished Service Award in 1962.

In 1947, the Sierra Club Handbook praised Clyde's mountaineering accomplishments:

Outstanding among members who have helped others gain mountain experience is Norman Clyde, whose amazing achievements in scaling practically all the peaks in the High Sierra are well known to mountaineers. More than one climber has exulted in a supposedly first ascent, only to find later that Clyde went up that "unclimbed peak" in the winter of, say, 1920! There are many seasoned climbers who can look back on their early days as novices in the mountains and remember with gratitude what they learned from Clyde.

Jointly with Allen Steck, he was the first recipient of the Sierra Club's Francis P. Farquhar Mountaineering Award in 1970.

Clyde Minaret, Clyde Spires, Clyde's Ledge, Clyde's Meadow along the Mountaineer's Route on Mount Whitney, and Norman Clyde Peak bear his name.

The Eastern California Museum in Independence has an extensive collection of memorabilia, documents and photos pertaining to Clyde's life on display. Wall Street Journal extreme sports correspondent Michael J. Ybarra described this exhibit as "absorbing".

Norman Clyde's life and mountaineering achievements were documented in the book, Close Ups of the High Sierra, published by La Siesta Press (Glendale, California) in 1962. In 1998, Spotted Dog Press published an expanded edition of the book, Norman Clyde: Close Up of the High Sierra, edited by Wynne Benti. The foreword to the 1998 edition of Close Ups of the High Sierra included a brief biography of Clyde, written by Benti, which contained the first in-depth information published about Clyde's wife, Winifred Bolster.

Clyde's life and mountaineering achievements were later documented in a biography written by Robert C. Pavlik and published in 2008, titled Norman Clyde: Legendary Mountaineer of California's Sierra Nevada.

== Bibliography ==
- Clyde, Norman (1971). Norman Clyde of the Sierra Nevada; Rambles Through the Range of Light. Scrimshaw Press. ISBN 0-912020-19-9.
