= Mount Dade =

Mountain in California, United States

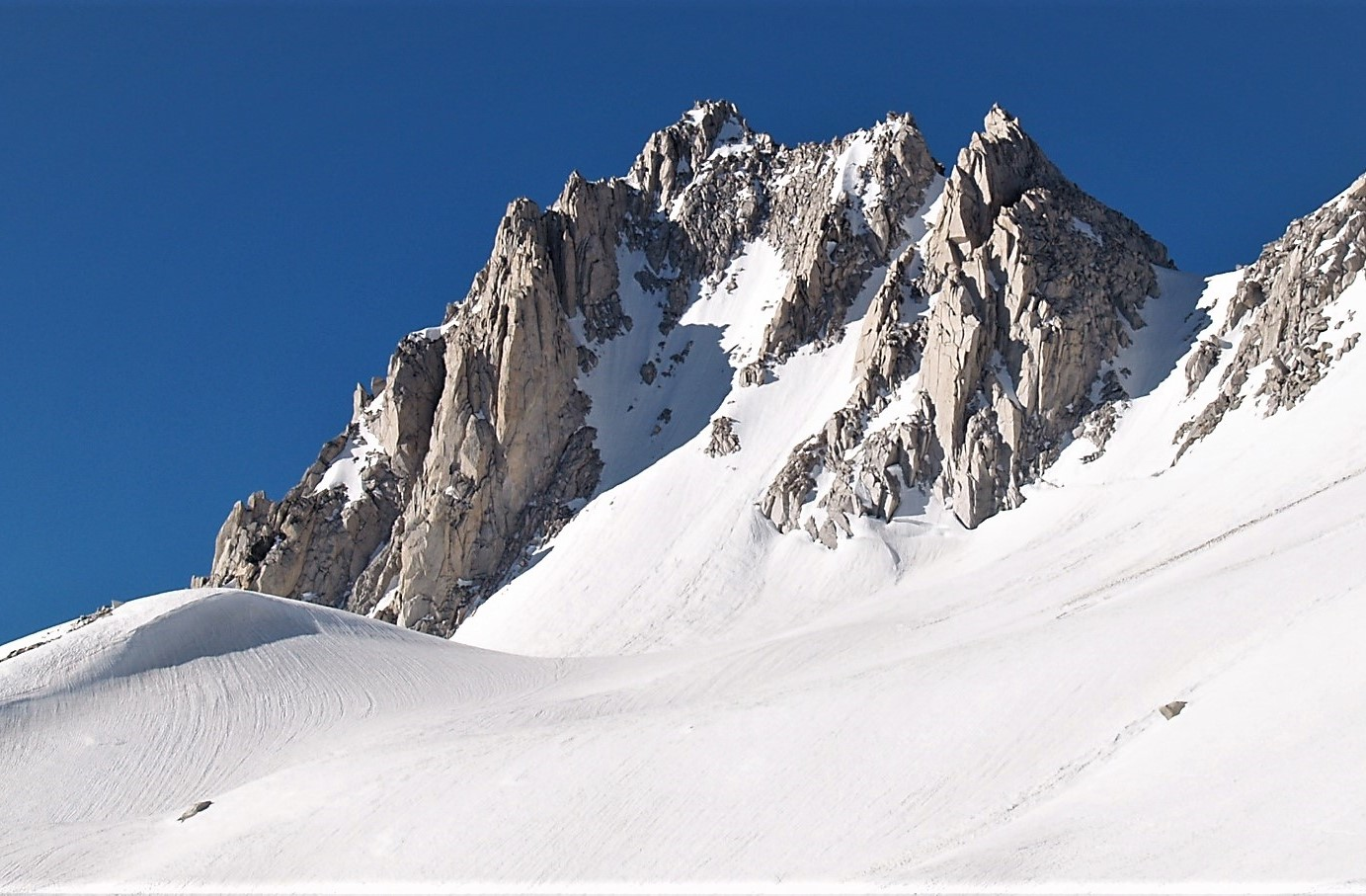
- North aspect

Highest point
- Elevation: 13,600+ ft (4,150+ m)
- Prominence: 200 ft (61 m)
- Parent peak: Mount Abbot (13,710 ft)
- Listing: Sierra Peaks Section
- Coordinates: 37°22′55″N 118°46′46″W

Geography
- Location within California Location within the United States
- Location: Fresno / Inyo counties, California U.S.
- Parent range: Sierra Nevada
- Topo map: USGS Mount Abbot

Geology
- Rock type: granite

Climbing
- First ascent: August 19, 1911 by Liston and McKeen
- Easiest route: class 2

Mount Dade is a 13,606 feet (4,147 m) mountain located on the crest of the Sierra Nevada mountain range in northern California, United States. It is situated in the John Muir Wilderness on the boundary between Sierra National Forest and Inyo National Forest, and along the common border of Fresno County with Inyo County. It is one mile west of Dade Lake, and approximately 22 miles (35 km) west of the community of Bishop. Nearby neighbors include Mount Abbot, 0.4 mile to the northwest, and Bear Creek Spire 1.2 mile to the southeast. The USGS probably named this peak during a 1907–09 survey, and the first ascent was made August 19, 1911, by Liston and McKeen, of Fresno.

== Climate ==
According to the Köppen climate classification system, Mount Dade is located in an alpine climate zone. Most weather fronts originate in the Pacific Ocean, and travel east toward the Sierra Nevada mountains. As fronts approach, they are forced upward by the peaks, causing them to drop their moisture in the form of rain or snowfall onto the range (orographic lift). Precipitation runoff from the west side of this mountain drains into Lake Italy, and from the east side into headwaters of Rock Creek.

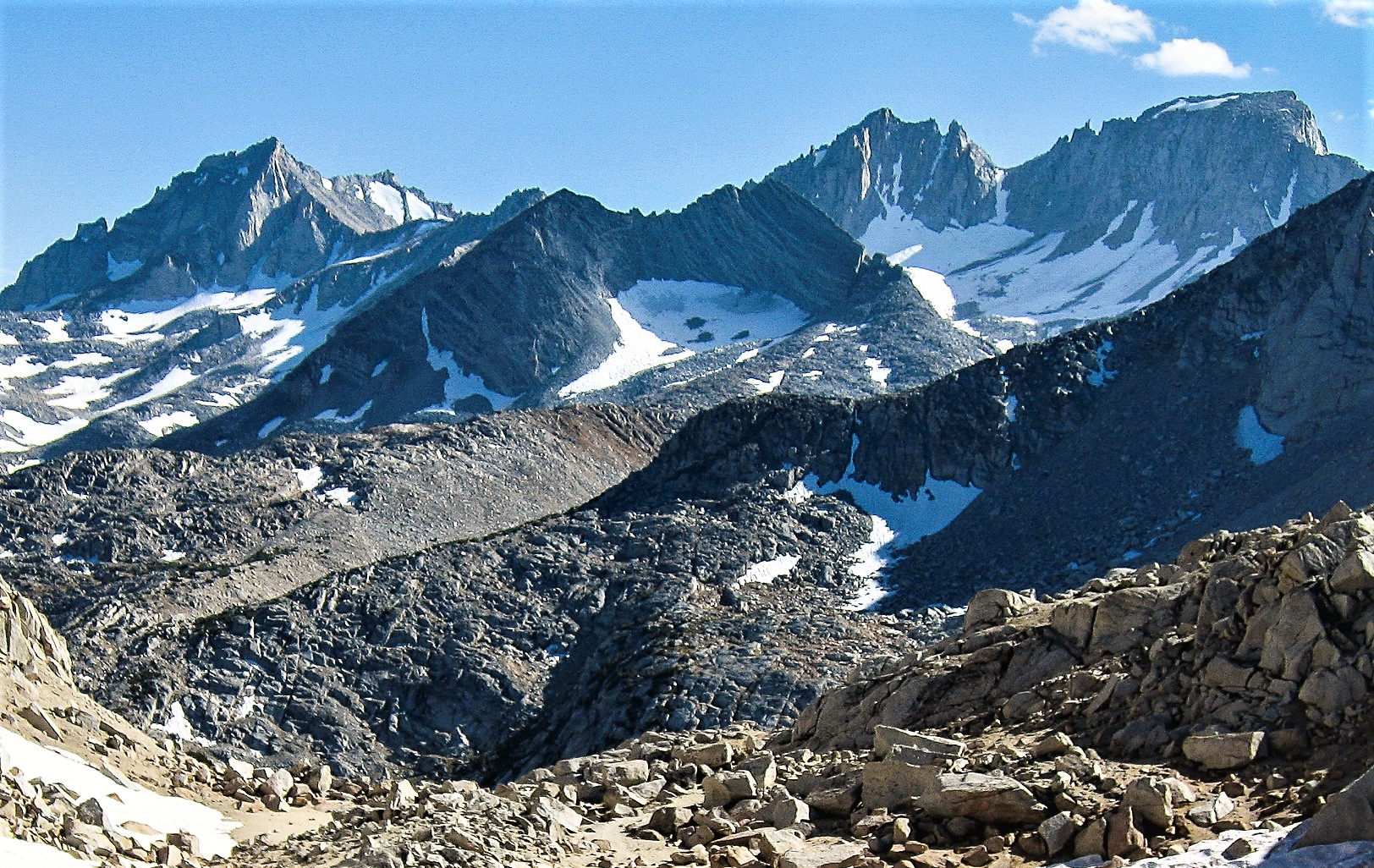
View from Mono Pass, left to rightː Bear Creek Spire, "Treasure Peak", Mount Dade, and Mount Abbot

== Climbing ==
Established rock climbing routes on Mount Dade:

- South Slope – class 2
- West Chute – class 2 – First Ascent 1911
- The Hourglass – class 2 – 1934
- Northwest Chute – class 3 – FA 1951
- Northeast Face – class 4 – FA 1956
- East Face – class 4 – FA 1960
- North Pillar – class 5.10 – FA 1995
- North Face - class 5

== See also ==
- List of the major 4000-meter summits of California
