= Palisade Glacier =

Glacier in California, United States

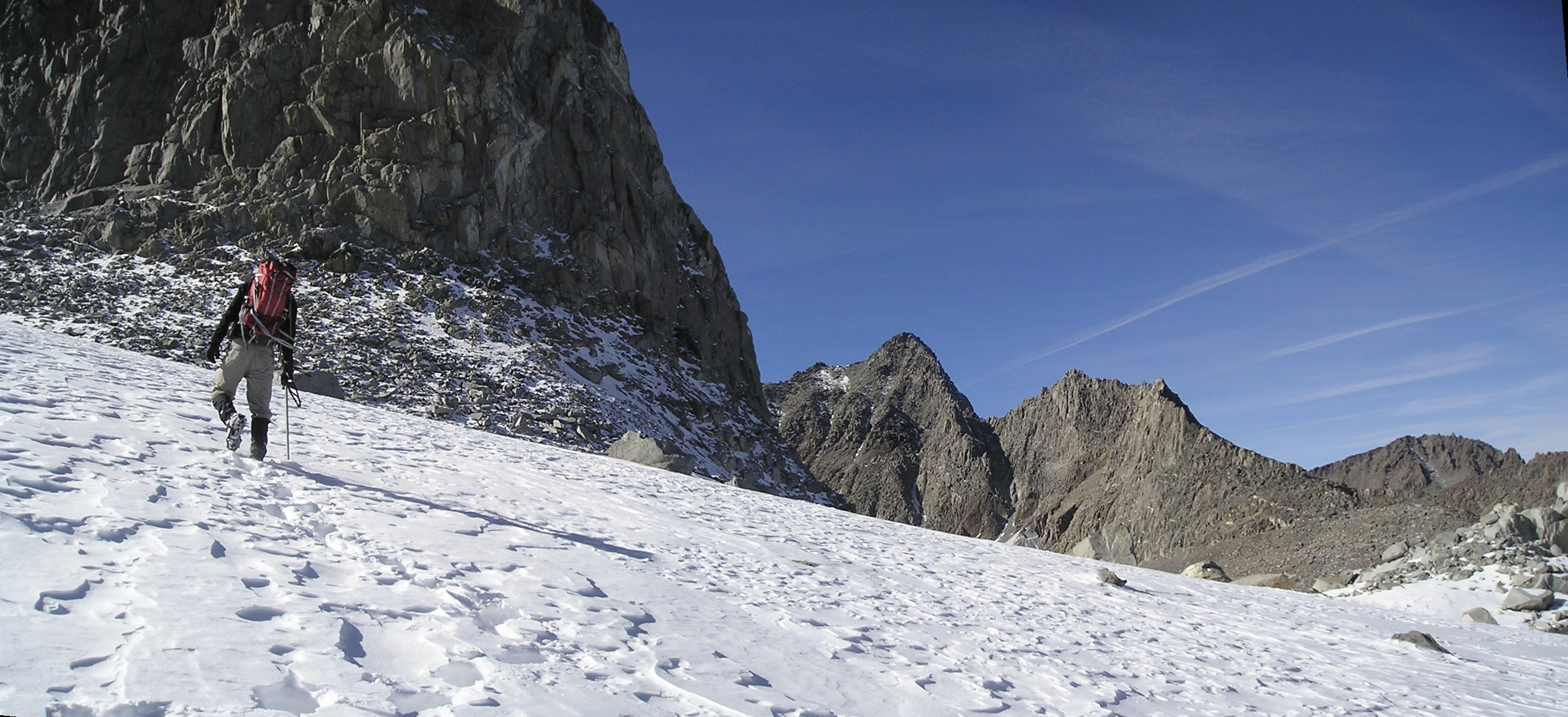
- Climbing the Palisade Glacier

- Location within California Location within the United States
- Type: Mountain glacier
- Location: Palisades, Inyo County, California, U.S.
- Coordinates: 37°06′00″N 118°30′37″W
- Area: .31 sq mi (0.80 km^{2})
- Length: .81 mi (1.30 km)

The Palisade Glacier is a glacier located on the northeast side of the Palisades within the John Muir Wilderness in the central Sierra Nevada of California.

== Description and history ==
The glacier descends from the flanks of four fourteeners, or mountain peaks over 14,000 ft (4,300 m) in elevation, including North Palisade (14,242 ft (4,341 m)), the highest peak of the Palisades group and the third highest peak in the Sierra Nevada overall. These glaciers are in Kings Canyon National Park.

The cirque containing the Palisade Glacier has a history of thousands of years of glaciation. The modern glacier attained its last maximum extent during the Little Ice Age, between 250 and 170 years ago (a period also known as the Matthes glaciation in the Sierra Nevada). As of 2000, it has an area of .31 sq mi (0.80 km^{2}) and the glacier is .81 mi (1.30 km) long and .50 mi (0.80 km) wide. It is located between 13,400 and 12,000 ft (4,100 and 3,700 m) and moves at a rate of 20 ft (6.1 m) per year, although it is also retreating. Palisade Glacier is one of the few glaciers in California that terminates in a proglacial lake dammed by its former moraine, turquoise-colored from the glacial powder suspended in the water. The Big Pine Lakes below the glacier are also the same color. Another feature of the glacier is a moulin, which was formed in a drought during 1977, and a bergschrund.

== Future ==
The last of the Palisade Glacier is expected to be gone by the year 2085. The majority of the glaciers in the Western United States are expected to disappear by the year 2100. The last Ice Age was 11,700 years ago. We are now in an interglacial period. It is possible for glaciers to retreat occasionally during interglacial periods. However, the Palisade Glacier, and the other glaciers in the Palisade group, persisted entirely through the Holocene (last 11,700 yrs). This means that the expected full retreat of the glacier can be linked to global warming from the emission of greenhouse gases.

== Chemical contamination ==
VOCs (acetone, naphlathene, benzene) and traces of metals (cadmium, chromium, arsenic) have been found in the Palisade Glacier. These chemicals have potentially harmful effects, if they melt downstream, on aquatic environments. The concentration of these VOCs and trace metals are higher in more recently formed ice. This is linked to a few sources, such as increased human agriculture and trans pacific volcanic eruptions. Both pesticides and ash/particulates can become airborne and get carried into weather systems. That weather becomes snowfall over the glacier, contaminating the snow and ice.

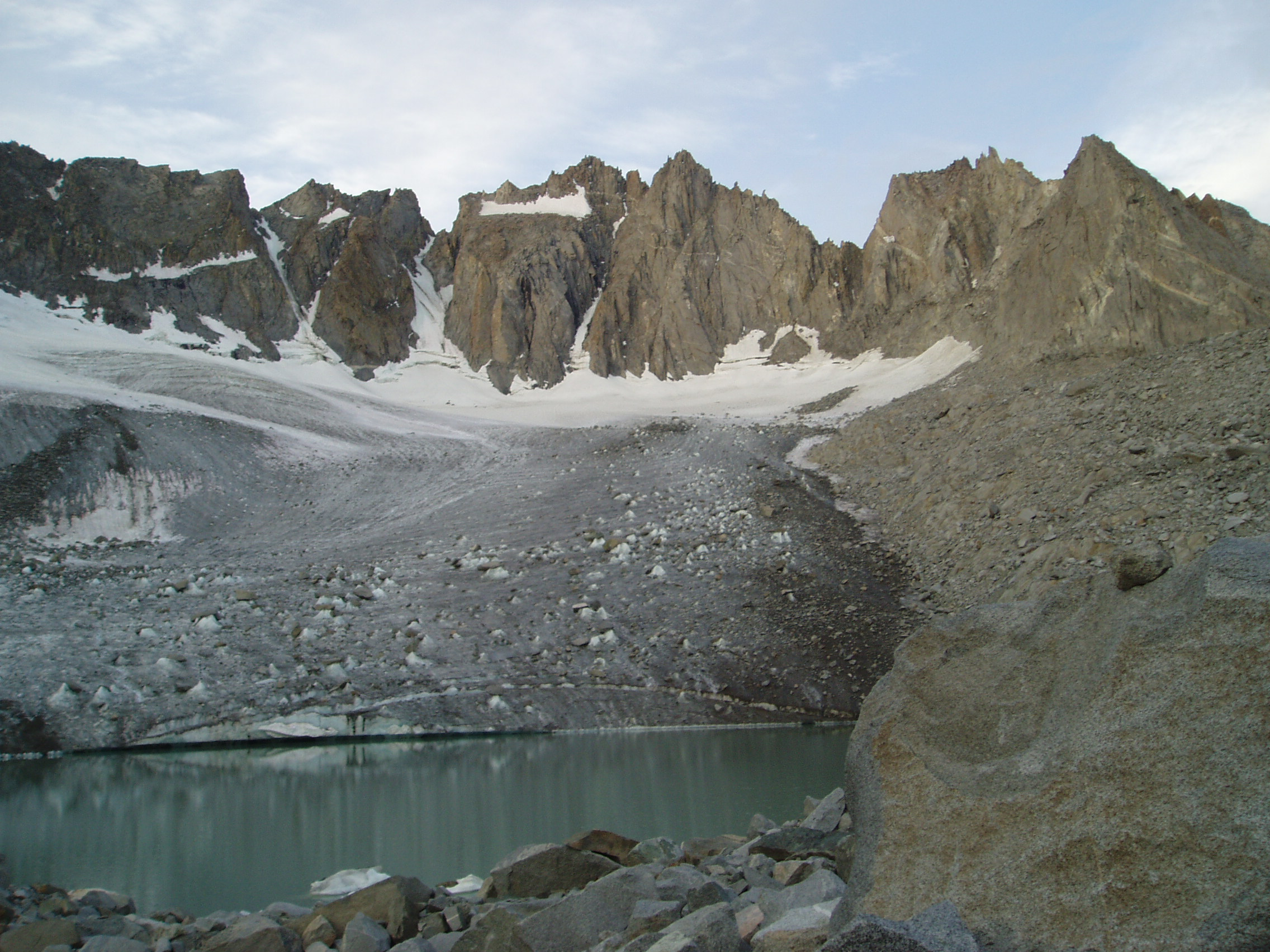
The Palisade Glacier and its proglacial lake

== See also in the United States ==
- List of glaciers in the United States
