= List of first ascents in the Sierra Nevada (U.S.) =

This list of first ascents in the Sierra Nevada can be sorted by any listed characteristic. The route taken and its Yosemite Decimal System rating are given where known. The only criterion for inclusion is the historic notability of the climb when it was completed. Both first ascents of summits by any route, and first ascents of technical non-summit routes, are listed.

| Peak | Height (ft) | Height (m) | Route | YDS class | Climbers | Date | Source |
|---|---|---|---|---|---|---|---|
| Red Lake Peak | 10,068 | 3,069 | | | John C. Fremont and Charles Preuss | February 1844 | Farquhar 1965 |
| Mount Langley | 14,032 | 4,277 | South Slopes | 1 | William Bellows | 1864 | Secor |
| Red Slate Mountain | 13,156 | 4,010 | | 1 | James Gardiner * disputed by Farquhar 1926 | 1864 | Secor |
| Mount Brewer | 13,576 | 4,138 | South Ridge | 2 | William Brewer, Charles Hoffmann | July 2, 1864 | Secor |
| Mount Tyndall | 14,025 | 4,275 | North Rib | 3 | Clarence King, Richard Cotter | July 6, 1864 | Secor |
| Mount Clark | 11,527 | 3,513 | Southeast Arête | 4 | Clarence King, James Gardiner | July 12, 1866 | Secor |
| Cathedral Peak | 10,911 | 3,326 | West Face | 4 | John Muir | September 1869 | Secor |
| Mount Lyell | 13,120 | 4,000 | Lyell Glacier | 2-3 | John B. Tilestone | August 29, 1871 | Secor |
| Mount Whitney | 14,505 | 4,421 | West Slope | 2 | "The Fishermen" Charles Begole, Albert Johnson, John Lucas | August 18, 1873 | Secor |
| Half Dome | 8,836 | 2,693 | Cables Route | 6 | George Anderson | October 12, 1875 | Farquhar |
| Mount Starr King | 9,096 | 2,772 | Northeast Side | 5.2 | George Bailey, E. S. Schuyler | August 1876 | Secor |
| Mount Maclure | 12,886 | 3,928 | Southeast Ridge | 3 | Willard Johnson | 1883 | Secor |
| Mount Williamson | 14,389 | 4,386 | Southeast ridge from George Creek | 2 | W.L. Hunter, C. Mulholland | 1884 | Secor |
| Split Mountain | 14,064 | 4,287 | | 1 | Frank Salque and party | July 1887 | Secor |
| Junction Peak | 13,888 | 4,233 | South Ridge | 3 | Edwin Copeland, E.N. Henderson | August 8, 1899 | Secor |
| Mount Sill | 14,159 | 4,316 | Southwest slope | 2-3 | Joseph N. LeConte, James Moffit, James Hutchinson, Robert Pike (Sierra Club) | July 24, 1903 | Secor |
| North Palisade | 14,248 | 4,343 | The LeConte Route | 4 | James S. Hutchinson, Joseph N. LeConte, James K. Moffitt | July 25, 1903 | Secor |
| Table Mountain | 13,627 | 4,154 | West Ridge, South Side | 3 | Gilbert Hassel, Fred Shoup & Paul Shoup | August 25, 1908 | Secor |
| Temple Crag | 12,982 | 3,957 | Southeast face | 3 | United States Geological Survey | 1909 | Secor |
| Milestone Mountain | 13,641 | 4,158 | Southwest Ridge | 3 | William E. Colby, Francis Farquhar & Robert Price | July 14, 1912 | Secor |
| Mount Muir | 14,018 | 4,273 | West face | 3 | LeRoy Jeffers | 1919 | Secor |
| Mount Humphreys | 13,992 | 4,265 | Southwest Slope and Northwest Face | 4 | George Bunn and party | August 3, 1919 | Secor |
| Black Kaweah | 13,680 | 4,170 | West Ridge | 3 | Onis Brown, James Hutchinson, Duncan McDuffie | August 11, 1920 | Secor |
| Triple Divide Peak | 12,634 | 3,851 | East Ridge | 2-3 | James Hutchinson, Charles Noble | 1920 | Secor |
| Middle Palisade | 14,018 | 4,273 | Farquhar Route | 4 | Francis Farquhar, Ansel Hall | August 26, 1921 | Secor |
| Mount Agassiz | 13,899 | 4,236 | | | Norman Clyde | August 30, 1925 | Secor |
| Mount Russell | 14,094 | 4,296 | East ridge | 3 | Norman Clyde | June 24, 1926 | Secor |
| Mount Morrison | 12,366 | 3,769 | East Slope | 2 | John Mendenhall or Norman Clyde | 1928 | Secor |
| Clyde Minaret | 12,264 | 3,738 | Glacier Route | 4 | Norman Clyde | June 27, 1928 | Secor |
| Norman Clyde Peak | 13,861 | 4,225 | North face | 3 | Norman Clyde | June 9, 1930 | Secor |
| Thunderbolt Peak | 14,003 | 4,268 | Underhill Couloir | 4 | Lewis Clark, Norman Clyde, Glen Dawson, Jules Eichorn, Francis Farquhar, Bestor Robinson, Robert L. M. Underhill | August 13, 1931 | Secor |
| Mount Farquhar | 12,899 | 3,932 | South Ridge | 3 | Norman Clyde and party | July 17, 1932 | Secor |
| Polemonium Peak | 14,080 | 4,290 | U Notch | 5.2 | Lewis Clark, Julie Mortimer, Jack Riegelhuth, Ted Waller | August 2, 1933 | Secor |
| Mount Le Conte | 13,930 | 4,250 | | 3 | Norman Clyde | June 1935 | Secor |
| North Dome | 7,542 | 2,299 | Royal Arches Route | 5.10 | Adam, Harris, Davis | 1936 | Roper; Steck |
| Lost Arrow Spire | 6,930 | 2,110 | Spire Chimney | 5.10 | Ax Nelson, John Salathé | 1947 | Roper; Steck |
| Sentinel Rock | 7,038 | 2,145 | Steck-Salathe Route | 5.9 | John Salathé, Allen Steck | 1950 | Roper; Steck |
| Palisade Crest | 13,559 | 4,133 | Northwest ridge | 4 | Don Jensen, Joan Jensen, Rex Post | 1969 | Secor |
