= List of California 14,000-foot summits =

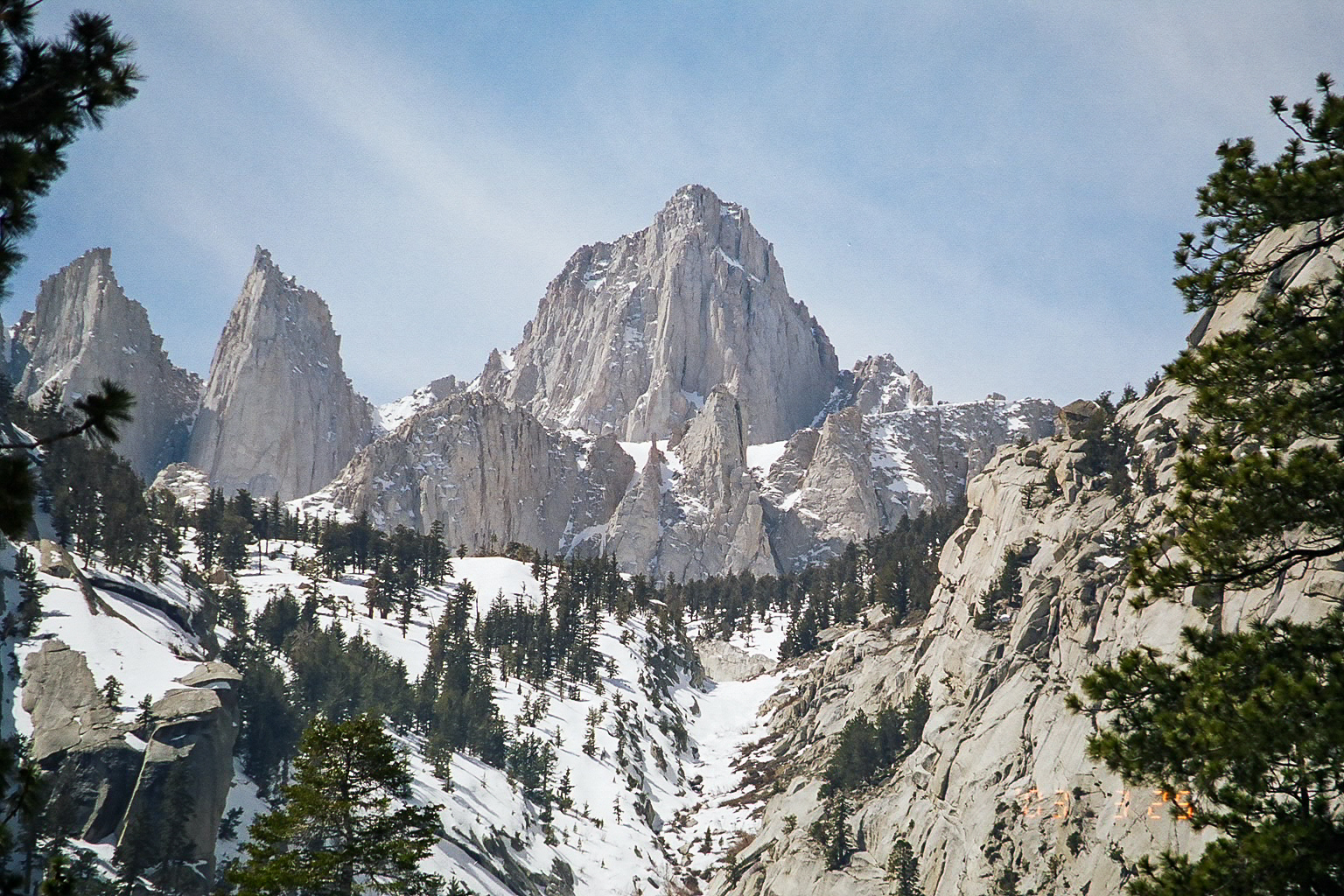
Mount Whitney is the highest summit of the Sierra Nevada, the State of California, and the contiguous United States.

There are 12 summits with elevation higher than 14,000 feet (4,267 m) in the U.S. state of California, with at least 300 feet (91.44 meters) of topographic prominence. (In mountaineering parlance, these peaks are known as fourteeners.)

The summit of a mountain or hill may be measured in three principal ways:

1. The topographic elevation of a summit measures the height of the summit above a geodetic sea level. (Note: All elevations in the 48 states of the contiguous United States include an elevation adjustment from the National Geodetic Vertical Datum of 1929 (NGVD 29) to the North American Vertical Datum of 1988 (NAVD 88). For further information, please see this United States National Geodetic Survey note.) (Note: If the elevation or prominence of a summit is calculated as a range of values, the arithmetic mean is shown.)
2. The topographic prominence of a summit is a measure of how high the summit rises above its surroundings. (Note: The topographic prominence of a summit is the topographic elevation difference between the summit and its highest or key col to a higher summit. The summit may be near its key col or quite far away. The key col for Denali in Alaska is the Isthmus of Rivas in Nicaragua, 7642 kilometers (4749 miles) away.)
3. The topographic isolation (or radius of dominance) of a summit measures how far the summit lies from its nearest point of equal elevation.

== Summits higher than 14,000 feet ==
Mountains in the following sortable table are the 12 California summits with at least 14,000 feet (4267 meters) of elevation and at least 300 feet (91.44 meters) of topographic prominence.

California summits higher than 14,000 feet
Rank	Mountain Peak	Mountain Range	Elevation	Prominence	Isolation	Location
1	Mount Whitney (Note: The summit of Mount Whitney is the highest point of the Sierra Nevada, the State of California, and the contiguous United States.)	Sierra Nevada	4421 m 14,505 ft	3072 m 10,080 ft	2,650.84	36.5786°N 118.2920°W
2	Mount Williamson (Note: The elevation of Mount Williamson includes an adjustment of +1.807 m (5.93 ft) from NGVD 29 to NAVD 88.)	Sierra Nevada	4383 m 14,379 ft	511 m 1,676 ft	8.75 km 5.44 mi	36.6559°N 118.3111°W
3	White Mountain Peak (Note: The summit of White Mountain Peak is the highest point of the White Mountains.)	White Mountains	4344 m 14,252 ft	2193 m 7,196 ft	108.7 km 67.5 mi	37.6341°N 118.2557°W
4	North Palisade (Note: The summit of North Palisade is the highest point of the Palisades.) (Note: The elevation of North Palisade includes an adjustment of +1.867 m (6.13 ft) from NGVD 29 to NAVD 88.)	Sierra Nevada	4343 m 14,248 ft	882 m 2,894 ft	51.9 km 32.3 mi	37.0943°N 118.5145°W
5	Mount Shasta (Note: The summit of Mount Shasta is the highest point of the southern Cascade Range.)	Cascade Range	4321.8 m 14,179 ft	2979 m 9,772 ft	539 km 335 mi	41.4092°N 122.1949°W
6	Mount Sill (Note: The elevation of Mount Sill includes an adjustment of +1.888 m (6.19 ft) from NGVD 29 to NAVD 88.)	Sierra Nevada	4316 m 14,159 ft	114 m 373 ft	1.02 km 0.63 mi	37.0960°N 118.5032°W
7	Mount Russell (Note: The elevation of Mount Russell includes an adjustment of +1.869 m (6.13 ft) from NGVD 29 to NAVD 88.)	Sierra Nevada	4296 m 14,094 ft	344 m 1,129 ft	1.29 km 0.8 mi	36.5901°N 118.2908°W
8	Split Mountain	Sierra Nevada	4286.6 m 14,064 ft	421 m 1,380 ft	9.92 km 6.16 mi	37.0209°N 118.4224°W
9	Mount Langley (Note: The elevation of Mount Langley includes an adjustment of +1.76 m (5.77 ft) from NGVD 29 to NAVD 88.)	Sierra Nevada	4277 m 14,032 ft	365 m 1,198 ft	7.05 km 4.38 mi	36.5234°N 118.2395°W
10	Mount Tyndall (Note: The elevation of Mount Tyndall includes an adjustment of +1.835 m (6.02 ft) from NGVD 29 to NAVD 88.)	Sierra Nevada	4275 m 14,025 ft	343 m 1,125 ft	2.31 km 1.44 mi	36.6556°N 118.3370°W
11	Mount Muir (Note: The elevation of Mount Muir includes an adjustment of +1.857 m (6.09 ft) from NGVD 29 to NAVD 88.)	Sierra Nevada	4273 m 14,018 ft	101 m 331 ft	0.83 km 0.52 mi	36.5647°N 118.2913°W
12	Middle Palisade (Note: The elevation of Middle Palisade includes an adjustment of +1.835 m (6.02 ft) from NGVD 29 to NAVD 88.)	Sierra Nevada	4273 m 14,018 ft	341 m 1,119 ft	4.17 km 2.59 mi	37.0702°N 118.4691°W

== See also ==
- Fourteener - includes a list of all of the fourteeners in the United States, as well as references, more information about how the list is determined, and caveats about accuracy
- List of mountain peaks of North America
  - List of mountain peaks of the United States
    - List of mountain peaks of California
      - List of the major 4000-meter summits of California
      - List of the major 3000-meter summits of California
      - List of California 14,000-foot summits
- List of mountain ranges of California
