= Fourteener =

Mountain peak of at least 14,000 feet

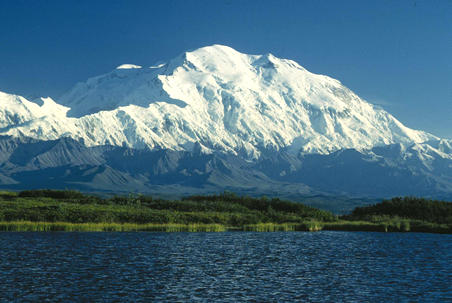
Denali, at 20,310 ft (6,190 m), is the highest mountain in the United States

In the mountaineering parlance of the Western United States, a fourteener (also spelled 14er) is a mountain peak with an elevation of at least 14,000 ft (4267 m). The 96 fourteeners in the United States are all west of the Mississippi River. Colorado has 53 fourteeners, the most of any single state. Alaska has 29, the second most of any single state. Many peak baggers try to climb all fourteeners in the contiguous United States, or in one particular state, or in another region.

== Qualification criteria ==
The summit of a mountain or hill may be measured in three principal ways:

1. Topographic elevation is the height of the summit above a geodetic sea level.
2. Topographic prominence is how high the summit rises above its surroundings.
3. Topographic isolation (or radius of dominance) is how far the summit lies from its nearest point of equal elevation.

Not all summits over 14,000 feet qualify as fourteeners. Summits that qualify are those considered by mountaineers to be independent. Objective standards for independence include topographic prominence and isolation (distance from a higher summit), or a combination of the two. However, fourteener lists do not always use such objective rules consistently.

A rule commonly used by mountaineers in the contiguous United States is that a peak must have at least 300 ft (91 m) of prominence to qualify. By this rule, Colorado has 53 fourteeners, California has 12, and Washington has 2.

According to the Mountaineering Club of Alaska, the standard in Alaska uses a 500-foot (150 m) prominence rule rather than a 300-foot (91 m) rule. By this rule, Alaska has at least 19 peaks over 14,000 ft (4,267 m) and is home to all 9 US peaks exceeding 15,000 ft (4,572 m).

== Fourteeners ==
The following table lists the 96 mountain peaks of the United States with at least 14,000 ft (4267 m) of topographic elevation and at least 300 ft (91.44 m) of topographic prominence. Of these, 53 rise in Colorado, 29 in Alaska, 12 in California and 2 in Washington. The 22 highest fourteeners are all found in Alaska.

Fourteeners of the United States
Rank	Mountain Peak	State	Mountain Range	Elevation	Prominence	Isolation	Location
1	Denali (Note: The summit of Denali is the highest point of the Alaska Range, the State of Alaska, the United States of America, and all of North America. Denali is the third-most topographically prominent and third-most topographically isolated summit on Earth after Mount Everest and Aconcagua.)	Alaska	Alaska Range	20,310 ft 6190.5 m	20,146 ft 6141 m	4,630 mi 7,451 km	63.0690°N 151.0063°W
2	Denali North Peak (Sourdough Peak)	Alaska	Alaska Range	19,470 ft 5934 m	1,320 ft 402 m	1.74 mi 2.8 km	63.0976°N 151.0063°W
3	Mount Saint Elias (Note: Mount Saint Elias is the second-highest major summit of both Canada and the United States.)	Alaska; Yukon	Saint Elias Mountains	18,009 ft 5489 m	11,250 ft 3429 m	25.6 mi 41.3 km	60.2927°N 140.9307°W
5	Mount Foraker	Alaska	Alaska Range	17,400 ft 5304 m	7,250 ft 2210 m	14.27 mi 23 km	62.9604°N 151.3998°W
6	Mount Bona (Note: The summit of Mount Bona is the highest point of the northwest Saint Elias Mountains.)	Alaska	Saint Elias Mountains	16,550 ft 5044 m	6,900 ft 2103 m	49.7 mi 80 km	61.3856°N 141.7495°W
8	Mount Blackburn (Note: The summit of Mount Blackburn is the highest point of the Wrangell Mountains.)	Alaska	Wrangell Mountains	16,390 ft 4996 m	11,640 ft 3548 m	60.7 mi 97.6 km	61.7305°N 143.4031°W
9	Mount Blackburn Southeast Peak	Alaska	Wrangell Mountains	16,286 ft 4964 m	536 ft 163 m	1.53 mi 2.47 km	61.7252°N 143.3925°W
10	Mount Sanford	Alaska	Wrangell Mountains	16,237 ft 4949 m	7,687 ft 2343 m	40.3 mi 64.8 km	62.2132°N 144.1292°W
11	South Buttress	Alaska	Alaska Range	15,885 ft 4842 m	315 ft 96 m	2.54 mi 4.09 km	63.0349°N 150.9768°W
13	Good Neighbor Peak (Boundary Peak 181)	Alaska; Yukon	Saint Elias Mountains	15,715 ft 4790 m	427 ft 130 m	1.63 mi 2.63 km	60.3354°N 139.6934°W
14	Mount Bona West Peak	Alaska	Saint Elias Mountains	15,660 ft 4773 m	360 ft 110 m	1.28 mi 2.06 km	61.3808°N 141.7867°W
15	Mount Churchill	Alaska	Saint Elias Mountains	15,638 ft 4766 m	1,138 ft 347 m	2.58 mi 4.16 km	61.4191°N 141.7152°W
16	Mount Fairweather (Note: Mount Fairweather on the international border of Alaska is the highest point the Canadian Province of British Columbia.) (Fairweather Mountain)	Alaska; British Columbia	Saint Elias Mountains	15,325 ft 4671 m	12,995 ft 3961 m	124.7 mi 201 km	58.9064°N 137.5265°W
17	Mount Hubbard	Alaska; Yukon	Saint Elias Mountains	14,951 ft 4557 m	8,061 ft 2457 m	21.3 mi 34.4 km	60.3194°N 139.0726°W
18	Mount Bear	Alaska	Saint Elias Mountains	14,831 ft 4520 m	5,054 ft 1540 m	20.1 mi 32.4 km	61.2834°N 141.1433°W
20	East Buttress	Alaska	Alaska Range	14,730 ft 4490 m	380 ft 116 m	1.49 mi 2.4 km	63.0603°N 150.9296°W
21	Peak 14630	Alaska	Alaska Range	14,630 ft 4459 m	580 ft 177 m	1.16 mi 1.86 km	63.0582°N 150.8931°W
22	Mount Hunter	Alaska	Alaska Range	14,573 ft 4442 m	4,653 ft 1418 m	6.88 mi 11.07 km	62.9504°N 151.0915°W
23	Mount Whitney (Note: The summit of Mount Whitney is the highest point of the Sierra Nevada, the State of California, and the contiguous United States.)	California	Sierra Nevada	14,505 ft 4421 m	10,080 ft 3072 m	1,647 mi 2,651 km	36.5786°N 118.2920°W
24	Mount Alverstone (Boundary Point 180)	Alaska; Yukon	Saint Elias Mountains	14,500 ft 4420 m	1,950 ft 594 m	2.25 mi 3.62 km	60.3518°N 139.0749°W
25	University Peak	Alaska	Saint Elias Mountains	14,470 ft 4410 m	3,210 ft 978 m	3.71 mi 5.97 km	61.3272°N 141.7867°W
26	Aello Peak (The Twaharpies)	Alaska	Saint Elias Mountains	14,445 ft 4403 m	1,445 ft 440 m	3.93 mi 6.32 km	61.3646°N 141.9001°W
27	Mount Elbert (Note: The summit of Mount Elbert is the highest point of the Rocky Mountains and the U.S. State of Colorado.)	Colorado	Sawatch Range	14,440 ft 4401.2 m	9,093 ft 2772 m	671 mi 1,079 km	39.1178°N 106.4454°W
28	Mount Massive (Note: Mount Massive is the second highest summit of the Rocky Mountains.) (Note: The elevation of Mount Massive includes an adjustment of +2.087 m (6.85 ft) from NGVD 29 to NAVD 88.)	Colorado	Sawatch Range	14,428 ft 4398 m	1,961 ft 598 m	5.06 mi 8.14 km	39.1875°N 106.4757°W
29	Mount Harvard (Note: The summit of Mount Harvard is the highest point of the Collegiate Peaks.)	Colorado	Sawatch Range	14,421 ft 4395.6 m	2,360 ft 719 m	14.93 mi 24 km	38.9244°N 106.3207°W
30	Mount Rainier (Note: The summit of Mount Rainier is the highest point of the Cascade Range and the U.S. State of Washington. Mount Rainier is the most prominent summit in the contiguous United States and the fourth-most prominent in North America.) (Note: The elevation of Mount Rainier includes an adjustment of +1.914 m (6.28 ft) from NGVD 29 to NAVD 88.)	Washington	Cascade Range	14,400 ft 4389 m	13,192 ft 4021 m	731 mi 1,177 km	46.8529°N 121.7604°W
31	Mount Williamson (Note: The elevation of Mount Williamson includes an adjustment of +1.807 m (5.93 ft) from NGVD 29 to NAVD 88.)	California	Sierra Nevada	14,379 ft 4383 m	1,676 ft 511 m	5.44 mi 8.75 km	36.6559°N 118.3111°W
32	Blanca Peak (Note: The summit of Blanca Peak is the highest point of the Sangre de Cristo Mountains.) (Note: The elevation of Blanca Peak includes an adjustment of +1.755 m (5.76 ft) from NGVD 29 to NAVD 88.)	Colorado	Sangre de Cristo Mountains	14,351 ft 4374 m	5,326 ft 1623 m	103.4 mi 166.4 km	37.5775°N 105.4856°W
33	La Plata Peak (Note: The elevation of La Plata Peak includes an adjustment of +1.983 m (6.51 ft) from NGVD 29 to NAVD 88.)	Colorado	Sawatch Range	14,343 ft 4372 m	1,836 ft 560 m	6.28 mi 10.11 km	39.0294°N 106.4729°W
34	Uncompahgre Peak (Note: The summit of Uncompahgre Peak is the highest point of the San Juan Mountains.)	Colorado	San Juan Mountains	14,321 ft 4365 m	4,277 ft 1304 m	85.1 mi 136.9 km	38.0717°N 107.4621°W
35	Crestone Peak (Note: The elevation of Crestone Peak includes an adjustment of +1.76 m (5.77 ft) from NGVD 29 to NAVD 88.)	Colorado	Sangre de Cristo Range	14,300 ft 4359 m	4,554 ft 1388 m	27.4 mi 44.1 km	37.9669°N 105.5855°W
36	Mount Lincoln (Note: The summit of Mount Lincoln is the highest point of the Mosquito Range.)	Colorado	Mosquito Range	14,293 ft 4356.5 m	3,862 ft 1177 m	22.6 mi 36.3 km	39.3515°N 106.1116°W
37	Castle Peak (Note: The summit of Castle Peak is the highest point of the Elk Mountains.)	Colorado	Elk Mountains	14,279 ft 4352.2 m	2,365 ft 721 m	20.9 mi 33.7 km	39.0097°N 106.8614°W
38	Grays Peak (Note: The summit of Grays Peak is the highest point of the Front Range and the Continental Divide of North America.)	Colorado	Front Range	14,278 ft 4352 m	2,770 ft 844 m	25 mi 40.3 km	39.6339°N 105.8176°W
39	Mount Antero (Note: The summit of Mount Antero is the highest point of the southern Sawatch Range.)	Colorado	Sawatch Range	14,276 ft 4351.4 m	2,503 ft 763 m	17.75 mi 28.6 km	38.6741°N 106.2462°W
40	Torreys Peak	Colorado	Front Range	14,275 ft 4351 m	560 ft 171 m	0.65 mi 1.05 km	39.6428°N 105.8212°W
41	Quandary Peak	Colorado	Mosquito Range	14,271 ft 4349.9 m	1,125 ft 343 m	3.16 mi 5.09 km	39.3973°N 106.1064°W
42	Mount Blue Sky (Note: The summit elevation of Mount Blue Sky includes a vertical offset of +1.798 m (5.9 ft) from the station benchmark.)	Colorado	Front Range	14,271 ft 4350 m	2,770 ft 844 m	9.79 mi 15.76 km	39.5883°N 105.6438°W
43	The Snave	Alaska	Wrangell Mountains	14,260 ft 4346 m	410 ft 125 m	2.13 mi 3.43 km	61.6953°N 143.3771°W
44	Longs Peak (Note: The summit of Longs Peak is the highest point of the northern Front Range.)	Colorado	Front Range	14,259 ft 4346 m	2,940 ft 896 m	43.6 mi 70.2 km	40.2550°N 105.6151°W
45	Mount Wilson (Note: The summit of Mount Wilson is the highest point of the San Miguel Mountains.) (Note: The elevation of Mount Wilson includes an adjustment of +1.899 m (6.23 ft) from NGVD 29 to NAVD 88.)	Colorado	San Miguel Mountains	14,252 ft 4344 m	4,024 ft 1227 m	33.1 mi 53.2 km	37.8391°N 107.9916°W
46	White Mountain Peak (Note: The summit of White Mountain Peak is the highest point of the White Mountains.)	California	White Mountains	14,252 ft 4344 m	7,196 ft 2193 m	67.5 mi 108.7 km	37.6341°N 118.2557°W
47	North Palisade (Note: The summit of North Palisade is the highest point of the Palisades.) (Note: The elevation of North Palisade includes an adjustment of +1.867 m (6.13 ft) from NGVD 29 to NAVD 88.)	California	Sierra Nevada	14,248 ft 4343 m	2,894 ft 882 m	32.3 mi 51.9 km	37.0943°N 118.5145°W
48	Mount Shavano	Colorado	Sawatch Range	14,231 ft 4337.7 m	1,619 ft 493 m	3.78 mi 6.09 km	38.6192°N 106.2393°W
49	Mount Princeton	Colorado	Sawatch Range	14,204 ft 4329.3 m	2,177 ft 664 m	5.19 mi 8.36 km	38.7492°N 106.2424°W
50	Mount Belford	Colorado	Sawatch Range	14,203 ft 4329.1 m	1,337 ft 408 m	3.3 mi 5.31 km	38.9607°N 106.3607°W
51	Crestone Needle (Note: The elevation of Crestone Needle includes an adjustment of +1.763 m (5.78 ft) from NGVD 29 to NAVD 88.)	Colorado	Sangre de Cristo Range	14,203 ft 4329 m	457 ft 139 m	0.45 mi 0.72 km	37.9647°N 105.5766°W
52	Mount Yale	Colorado	Sawatch Range	14,200 ft 4328.2 m	1,896 ft 578 m	5.55 mi 8.93 km	38.8442°N 106.3138°W
53	Mount Shasta (Note: The summit of Mount Shasta is the highest point of the southern Cascade Range.)	California	Cascade Range	14,179 ft 4321.8 m	9,772 ft 2979 m	335 mi 539 km	41.4092°N 122.1949°W
54	Mount Bross	Colorado	Mosquito Range	14,178 ft 4321.6 m	312 ft 95 m	0.99 mi 1.6 km	39.3354°N 106.1077°W
55	Kit Carson Mountain (Note: The elevation of Kit Carson Mountain includes an adjustment of +1.773 m (5.82 ft) from NGVD 29 to NAVD 88.)	Colorado	Sangre de Cristo Range	14,171 ft 4319 m	1,025 ft 312 m	1.27 mi 2.05 km	37.9797°N 105.6026°W
56	Maroon Peak	Colorado	Elk Mountains	14,163 ft 4317 m	2,336 ft 712 m	8.06 mi 12.97 km	39.0708°N 106.9890°W
57	Mount Wrangell	Alaska	Wrangell Mountains	14,163 ft 4317 m	5,613 ft 1711 m	14.79 mi 23.8 km	62.0059°N 144.0187°W
58	Tabeguache Peak	Colorado	Sawatch Range	14,162 ft 4316.7 m	455 ft 139 m	0.75 mi 1.21 km	38.6255°N 106.2509°W
59	Mount Oxford	Colorado	Collegiate Peaks	14,160 ft 4315.9 m	653 ft 199 m	1.22 mi 1.97 km	38.9648°N 106.3388°W
60	Mount Sill (Note: The elevation of Mount Sill includes an adjustment of +1.888 m (6.19 ft) from NGVD 29 to NAVD 88.)	California	Sierra Nevada	14,159 ft 4316 m	373 ft 114 m	0.63 mi 1.02 km	37.0960°N 118.5032°W
61	Mount Sneffels (Note: The summit of Mount Sneffels is the highest point of the Sneffels Range.)	Colorado	Sneffels Range	14,158 ft 4315.4 m	3,050 ft 930 m	15.73 mi 25.3 km	38.0038°N 107.7923°W
62	Mount Democrat	Colorado	Mosquito Range	14,155 ft 4314.5 m	768 ft 234 m	1.27 mi 2.04 km	39.3396°N 106.1400°W
63	Capitol Peak (Note: The elevation of Capitol Peak includes an adjustment of +1.991 m (6.53 ft) from NGVD 29 to NAVD 88.)	Colorado	Elk Mountains	14,137 ft 4309 m	1,750 ft 533 m	7.44 mi 11.98 km	39.1503°N 107.0829°W
64	Liberty Cap (Note: The elevation of Liberty Cap includes an adjustment of +1.758 m (5.77 ft) from NGVD 29 to NAVD 88.)	Washington	Cascade Range	14,118 ft 4303 m	492 ft 150 m	0.98 mi 1.57 km	46.8630°N 121.7749°W
65	Pikes Peak (Note: Pikes Peak is the easternmost 14,000-foot (4267.2 m) summit of the United States. Pikes Peak was the inspiration for the lyrics of America the Beautiful.)	Colorado	Front Range	14,115 ft 4302.31 m	5,530 ft 1686 m	60.8 mi 97.8 km	38.8405°N 105.0442°W
66	Snowmass Mountain	Colorado	Elk Mountains	14,099 ft 4297.3 m	1,152 ft 351 m	2.34 mi 3.77 km	39.1188°N 107.0665°W
67	Mount Russell (Note: The elevation of Mount Russell includes an adjustment of +1.869 m (6.13 ft) from NGVD 29 to NAVD 88.)	California	Sierra Nevada	14,094 ft 4296 m	1,129 ft 344 m	0.8 mi 1.29 km	36.5901°N 118.2908°W
68	Windom Peak (Note: The summit of Windom Peak is the highest point of the Needle Mountains and La Plata County, Colorado.) (Note: Mount Eolus may be higher than Windom Peak.) (Note: The elevation of Windom Peak includes an adjustment of +1.785 m (5.86 ft) from NGVD 29 to NAVD 88.)	Colorado	Needle Mountains	14,093 ft 4296 m	2,187 ft 667 m	26.4 mi 42.4 km	37.6212°N 107.5919°W
69	Mount Eolus (Note: The elevation of Mount Eolus includes an adjustment of +1.756 m (5.76 ft) from NGVD 29 to NAVD 88.)	Colorado	Needle Mountains	14,090 ft 4295 m	1,024 ft 312 m	1.69 mi 2.72 km	37.6218°N 107.6227°W
70	Challenger Point (Note: The elevation of Challenger Point includes an adjustment of +1.752 m (5.75 ft) from NGVD 29 to NAVD 88.)	Colorado	Sangre de Cristo Range	14,087 ft 4294 m	301 ft 92 m	0.22 mi 0.36 km	37.9804°N 105.6066°W
71	Mount Columbia	Colorado	Sawatch Range	14,077 ft 4290.8 m	893 ft 272 m	1.9 mi 3.05 km	38.9039°N 106.2975°W
72	Missouri Mountain	Colorado	Sawatch Range	14,074 ft 4289.8 m	847 ft 258 m	1.31 mi 2.11 km	38.9476°N 106.3785°W
73	Mount Augusta	Alaska; Yukon	Saint Elias Mountains	14,070 ft 4289 m	5,082 ft 1549 m	14.41 mi 23.2 km	60.3074°N 140.4584°W
74	Humboldt Peak (Note: The elevation of Humboldt Peak includes an adjustment of +1.79 m (5.87 ft) from NGVD 29 to NAVD 88.)	Colorado	Sangre de Cristo Range	14,070 ft 4289 m	1,204 ft 367 m	1.41 mi 2.27 km	37.9762°N 105.5552°W
75	Mount Bierstadt	Colorado	Front Range	14,065 ft 4287 m	720 ft 219 m	1.12 mi 1.8 km	39.5826°N 105.6688°W
76	Sunlight Peak (Note: The elevation of Sunlight Peak includes an adjustment of +1.804 m (5.92 ft) from NGVD 29 to NAVD 88.)	Colorado	Needle Mountains	14,065 ft 4287 m	399 ft 122 m	0.48 mi 0.77 km	37.6274°N 107.5959°W
77	Split Mountain	California	Sierra Nevada	14,064 ft 4286.6 m	1,380 ft 421 m	6.16 mi 9.92 km	37.0209°N 118.4224°W
78	Handies Peak	Colorado	San Juan Mountains	14,058 ft 4284.8 m	1,908 ft 582 m	11.18 mi 18 km	37.9130°N 107.5044°W
79	Culebra Peak (Note: The summit of Culebra Peak is the highest point of the Culebra Range.) (Note: The elevation of Culebra Peak includes an adjustment of +1.74 m (5.71 ft) from NGVD 29 to NAVD 88.)	Colorado	Culebra Range	14,053 ft 4283 m	4,827 ft 1471 m	35.5 mi 57.1 km	37.1224°N 105.1858°W
80	Ellingwood Point (Note: The elevation of Ellingwood Point includes an adjustment of +1.789 m (5.87 ft) from NGVD 29 to NAVD 88.)	Colorado	Sangre de Cristo Range	14,048 ft 4282 m	342 ft 104 m	0.52 mi 0.83 km	37.5826°N 105.4927°W
81	Mount Lindsey (Note: The elevation of Mount Lindsey includes an adjustment of +1.691 m (5.55 ft) from NGVD 29 to NAVD 88.)	Colorado	Sangre de Cristo Range	14,048 ft 4282 m	1,542 ft 470 m	2.26 mi 3.64 km	37.5837°N 105.4449°W
82	Little Bear Peak (Note: The elevation of Little Bear Peak includes an adjustment of +1.733 m (5.69 ft) from NGVD 29 to NAVD 88.)	Colorado	Sangre de Cristo Range	14,043 ft 4280 m	377 ft 115 m	0.98 mi 1.58 km	37.5666°N 105.4972°W
83	Mount Sherman (Note: The elevation of Mount Sherman includes an adjustment of +2.029 m (6.66 ft) from NGVD 29 to NAVD 88.)	Colorado	Mosquito Range	14,043 ft 4280 m	850 ft 259 m	8.06 mi 12.97 km	39.2250°N 106.1699°W
84	Redcloud Peak (Note: The elevation of Redcloud Peak includes an adjustment of +2.015 m (6.61 ft) from NGVD 29 to NAVD 88.)	Colorado	San Juan Mountains	14,041 ft 4280 m	1,436 ft 438 m	4.91 mi 7.9 km	37.9410°N 107.4219°W
85	Mount Langley (Note: The elevation of Mount Langley includes an adjustment of +1.76 m (5.77 ft) from NGVD 29 to NAVD 88.)	California	Sierra Nevada	14,032 ft 4277 m	1,198 ft 365 m	4.38 mi 7.05 km	36.5234°N 118.2395°W
86	Mount Tyndall (Note: The elevation of Mount Tyndall includes an adjustment of +1.835 m (6.02 ft) from NGVD 29 to NAVD 88.)	California	Sierra Nevada	14,025 ft 4275 m	1,125 ft 343 m	1.44 mi 2.31 km	36.6556°N 118.3370°W
87	Pyramid Peak	Colorado	Elk Mountains	14,025 ft 4274.7 m	1,638 ft 499 m	2.09 mi 3.36 km	39.0717°N 106.9502°W
88	Wilson Peak (Note: The elevation of Wilson Peak includes an adjustment of +1.877 m (6.16 ft) from NGVD 29 to NAVD 88.)	Colorado	San Juan Mountains	14,023 ft 4274 m	857 ft 261 m	1.51 mi 2.43 km	37.8603°N 107.9847°W
89	San Luis Peak (Note: The summit of San Luis Peak is the highest point of the La Garita Mountains.)	Colorado	La Garita Mountains	14,022 ft 4273.8 m	3,113 ft 949 m	27 mi 43.4 km	37.9868°N 106.9313°W
90	Wetterhorn Peak (Note: The elevation of Wetterhorn Peak includes an adjustment of +1.903 m (6.24 ft) from NGVD 29 to NAVD 88.)	Colorado	San Juan Mountains	14,021 ft 4274 m	1,635 ft 498 m	2.77 mi 4.45 km	38.0607°N 107.5109°W
91	Mount Muir (Note: The elevation of Mount Muir includes an adjustment of +1.857 m (6.09 ft) from NGVD 29 to NAVD 88.)	California	Sierra Nevada	14,018 ft 4273 m	331 ft 101 m	0.52 mi 0.83 km	36.5647°N 118.2913°W
92	Middle Palisade (Note: The elevation of Middle Palisade includes an adjustment of +1.835 m (6.02 ft) from NGVD 29 to NAVD 88.)	California	Sierra Nevada	14,018 ft 4273 m	1,119 ft 341 m	2.59 mi 4.17 km	37.0702°N 118.4691°W
93	Mount Wrangell West Peak	Alaska	Wrangell Mountains	14,013 ft 4271 m	563 ft 172 m	1.46 mi 2.35 km	62.0091°N 144.0630°W
94	Mount of the Holy Cross (Note: The summit of Mount of the Holy Cross is the highest point of the northern Sawatch Range.) (Note: The summit elevation of Mount of the Holy Cross includes a vertical offset of +0.61 m (2 ft) from the station benchmark.)	Colorado	Sawatch Range	14,011 ft 4270.5 m	2,113 ft 644 m	18.52 mi 29.8 km	39.4668°N 106.4817°W
95	Huron Peak	Colorado	Sawatch Range	14,010 ft 4270.2 m	1,423 ft 434 m	3.21 mi 5.16 km	38.9455°N 106.4381°W
96	Sunshine Peak (Note: The elevation of Sunshine Peak includes an adjustment of +1.969 m (6.46 ft) from NGVD 29 to NAVD 88.)	Colorado	San Juan Mountains	14,007 ft 4269 m	501 ft 153 m	1.27 mi 2.05 km	37.9228°N 107.4256°W

== Topographic prominence ==
The table above uses a minimum topographic prominence criterion of 300 ft (91.44 m) and includes 96 peaks. The number of peaks included depends upon the minimum topographic prominence criterion. A criterion of 100 m (328.1 ft) includes 90 peaks, 500 ft (152.4 m) includes 77 peaks, 1,000 ft (304.8 m) includes 63 peaks, and 500 m (1,640 ft) includes 46 peaks.

The following U.S. summits have 14,000 ft of elevation, but have less than 300 ft of topographic prominence:

- Denali, Browne Tower, 14,530, Alaska: Prominence = 25–125 feet (7.6–38.1 m). Why this became included on some fourteener lists is unclear.
- Mount Cameron, 14,238, Colorado: Prominence = 118 feet.
- El Diente Peak, 14,159, Colorado: Prominence = 239 feet. On many fourteener lists.
- Point Success, 14,158, Washington: Prominence = 118 feet.
- Polemonium Peak, 14,080+, California: Prominence = 160–240 feet.
- Starlight Peak, 14,080, California: Prominence = 80–160 feet.
- North Conundrum Peak, 14,040+, Colorado: Prominence = 200–280 feet.
- North Eolus, 14,039, Colorado: Prominence = 159–199 feet.
- North Maroon Peak, 14,014, Colorado: Official Prominence = 234 feet. On many fourteener lists, partially due to analysis with higher-resolution topographic data suggesting its true prominence is greater than 300 feet.
- Thunderbolt Peak, 14,003, California: Prominence = 223 feet.

== Gallery ==
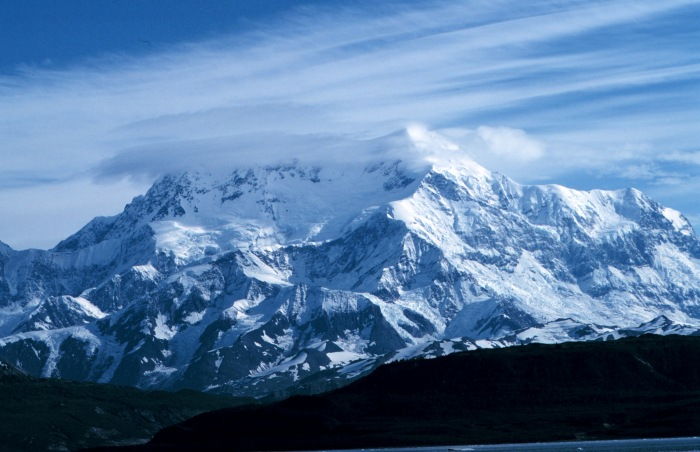
Mount Saint Elias, Alaska

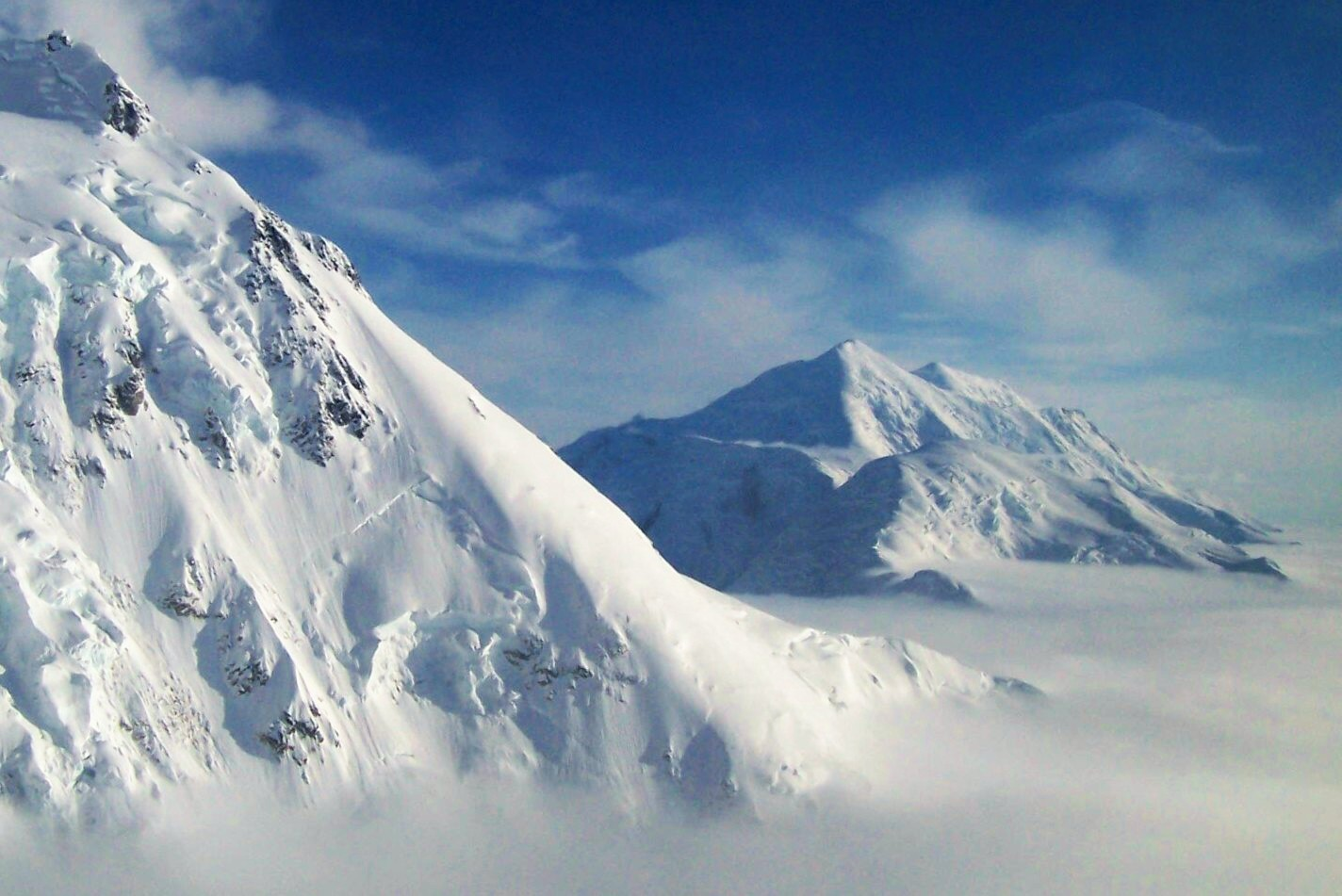
Mount Foraker, Alaska

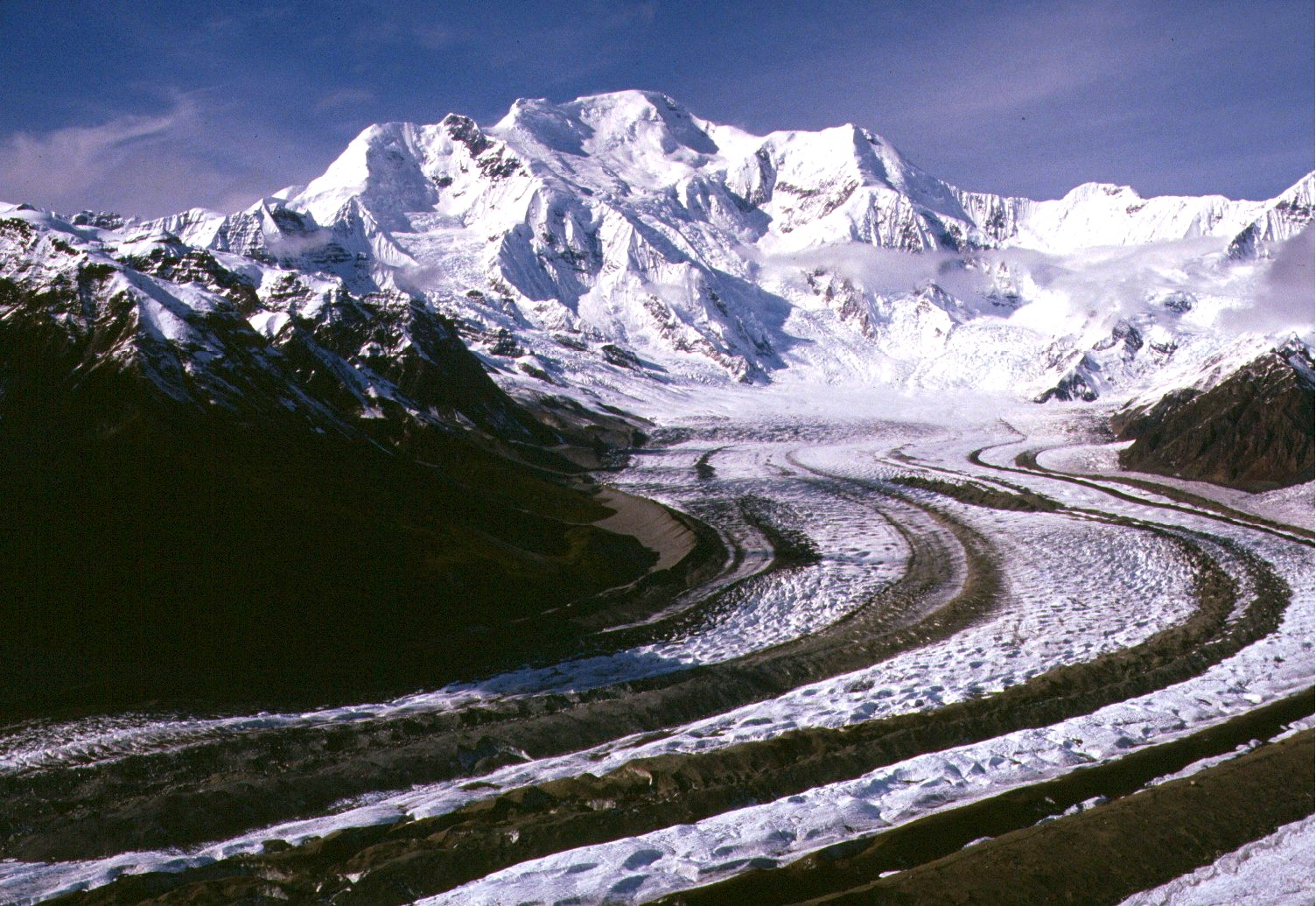
Mount Blackburn, Alaska

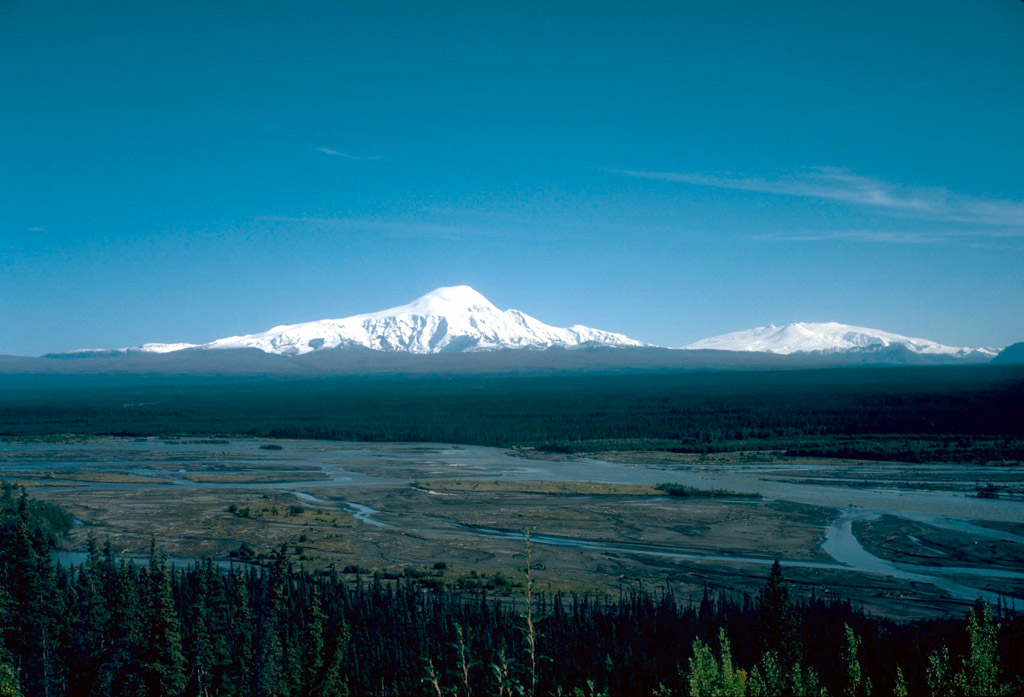
Mount Sanford and Mount Wrangell, Alaska

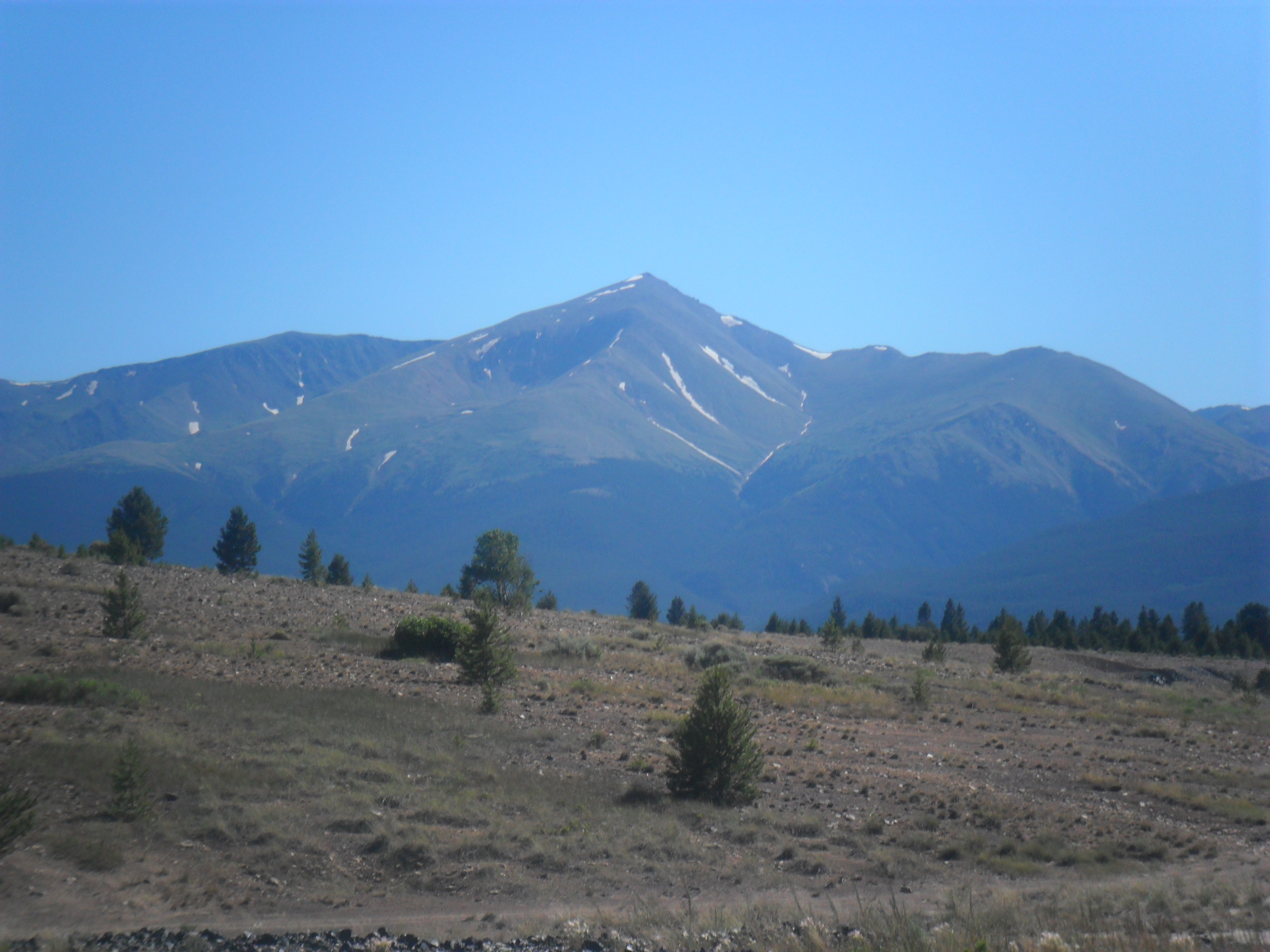
Mount Elbert, Colorado

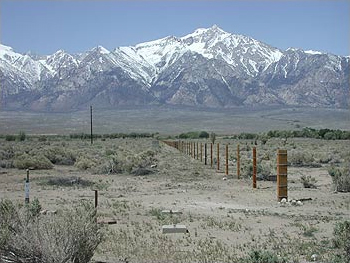
Mount Williamson, California

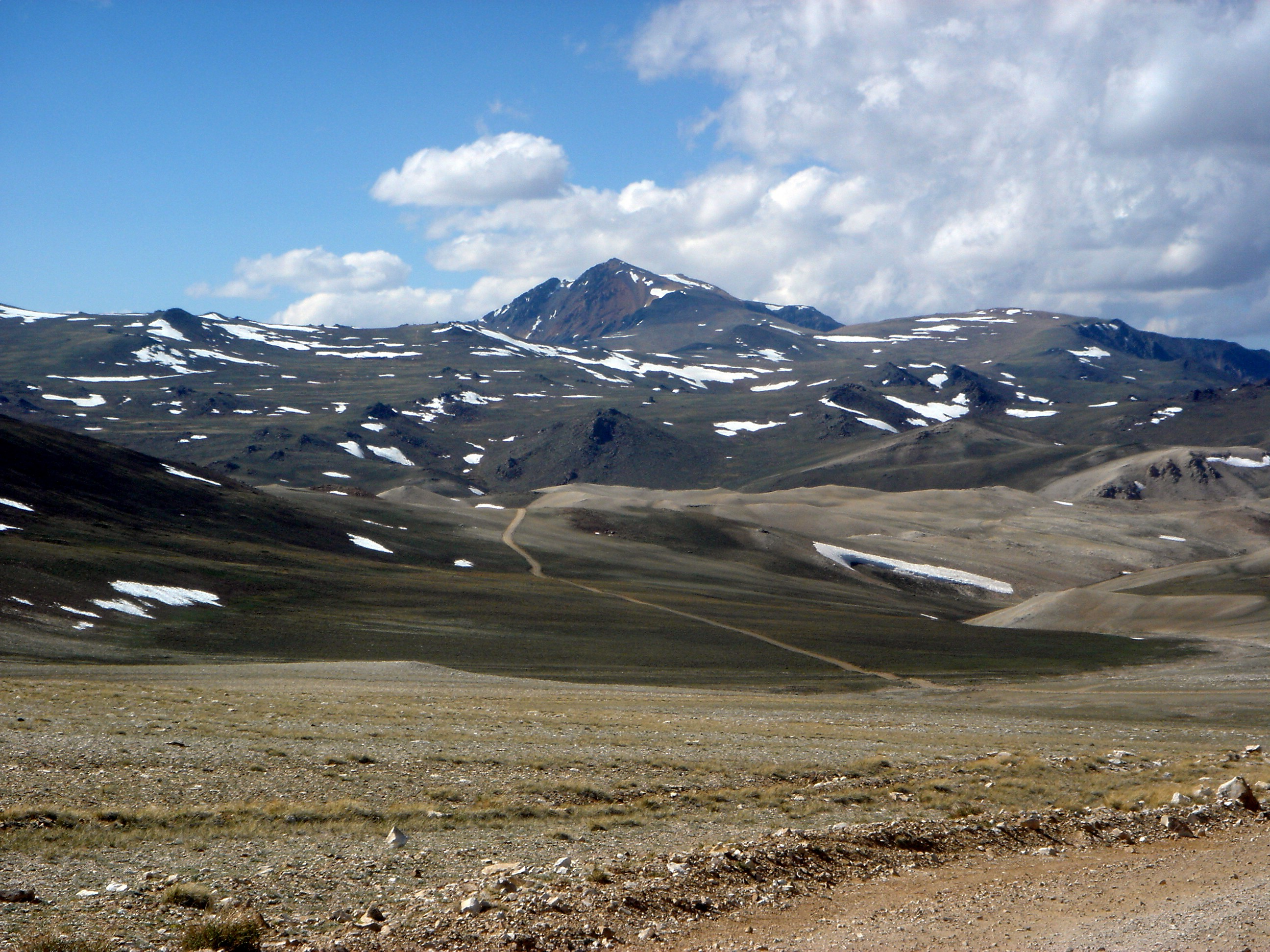
White Mountain Peak, California

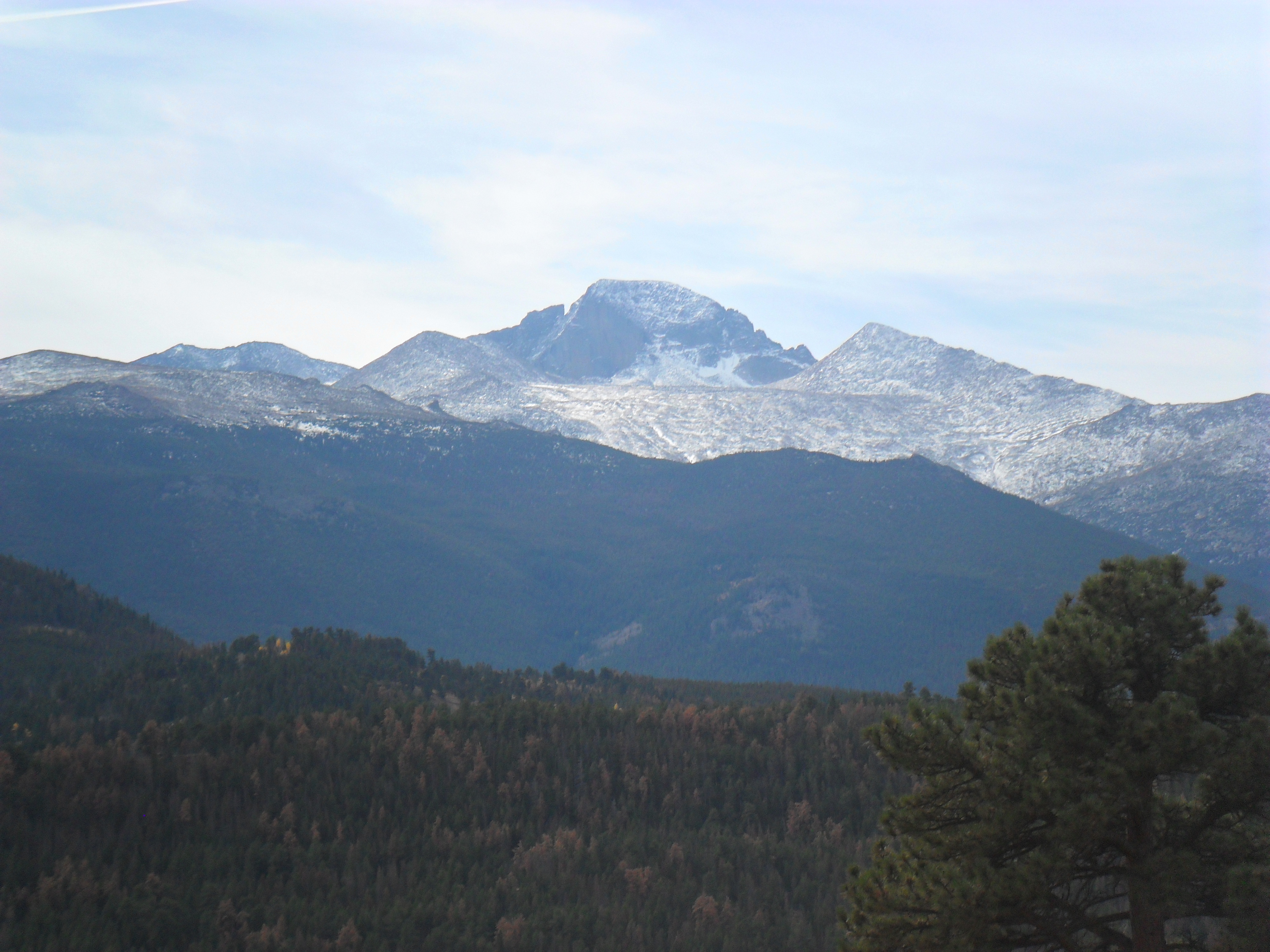
Longs Peak, Colorado

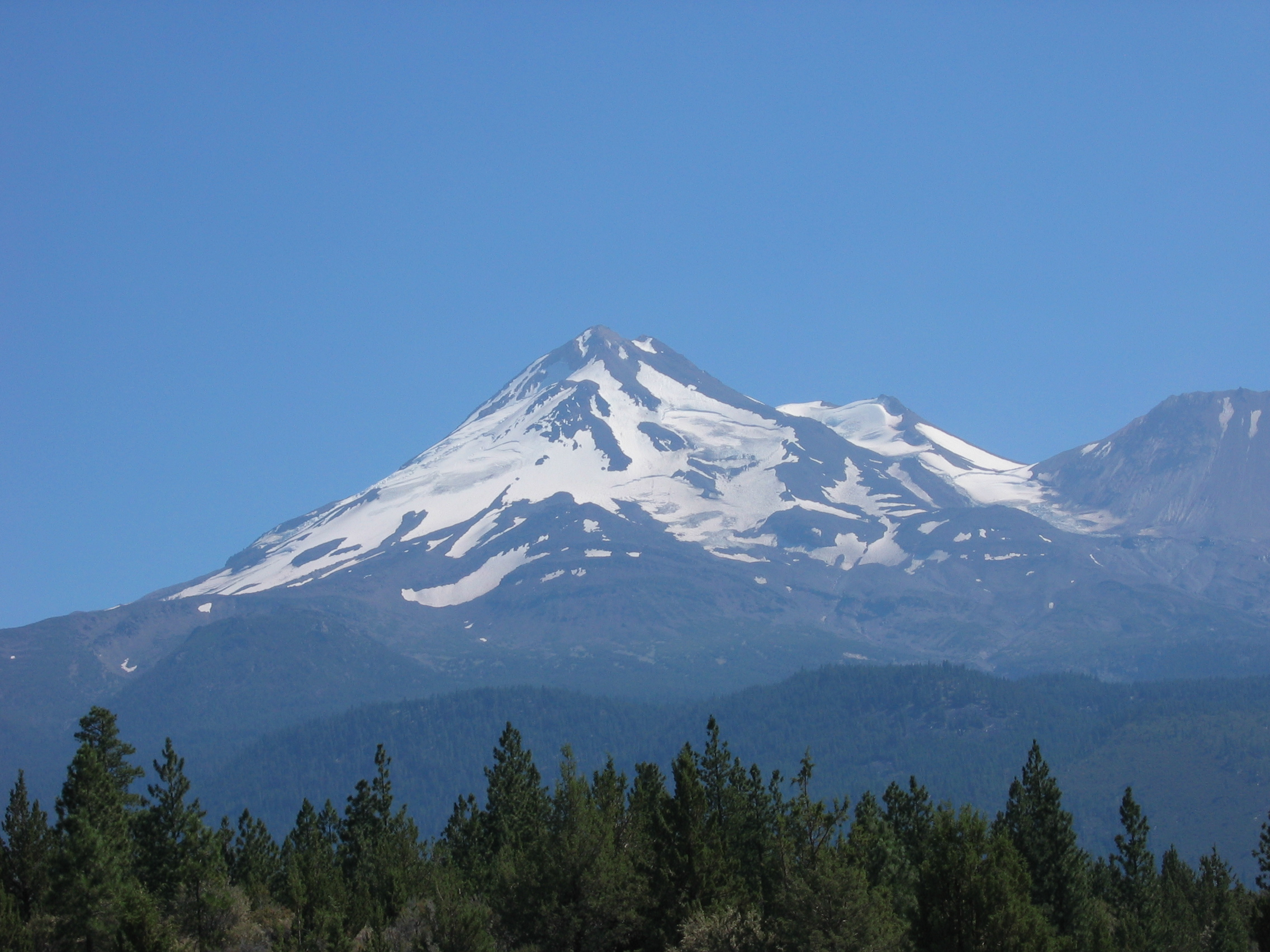
Mount Shasta, California

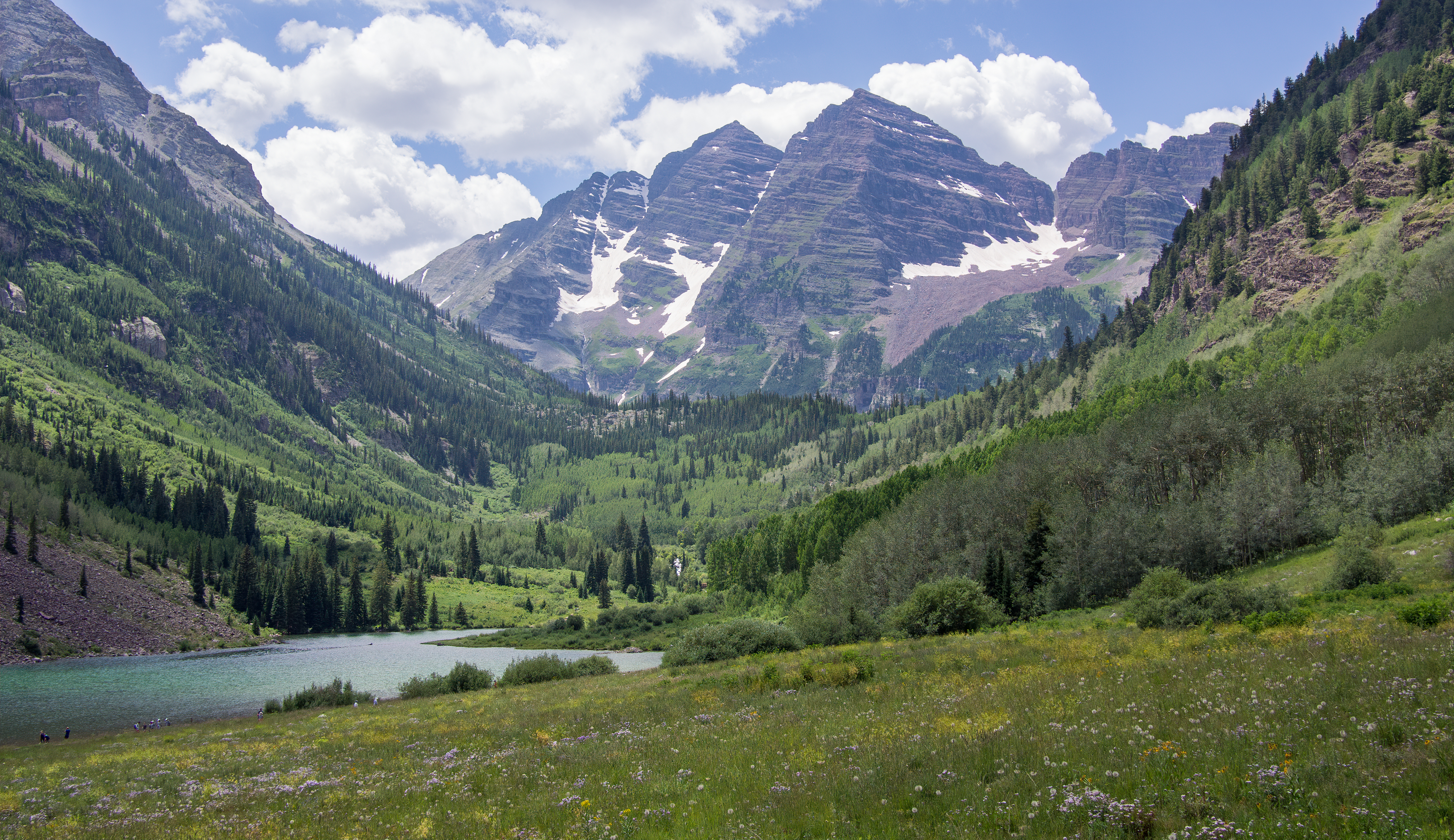
Maroon Bells (Maroon Peak and North Maroon Peak), Colorado

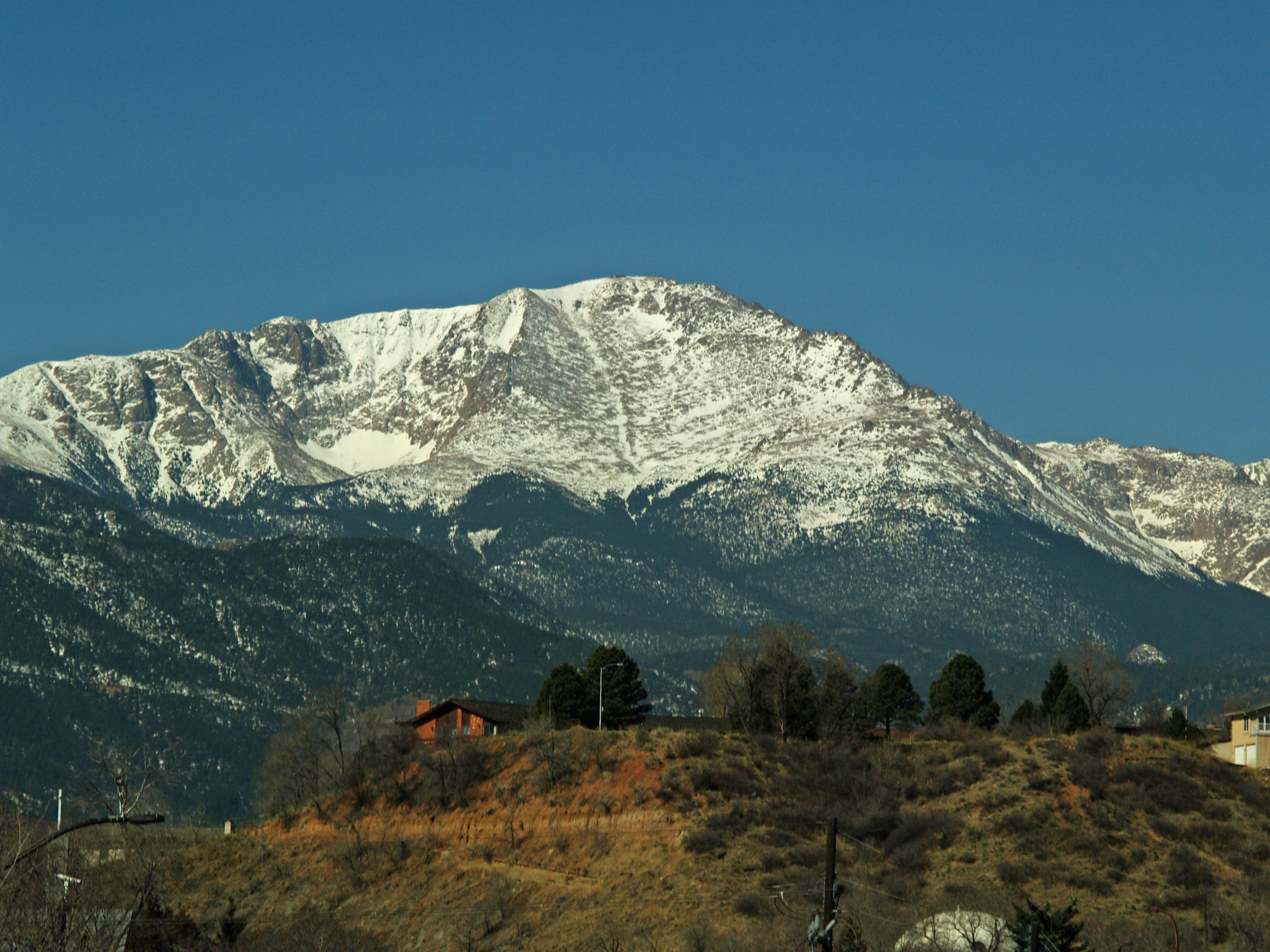
Pikes Peak, Colorado

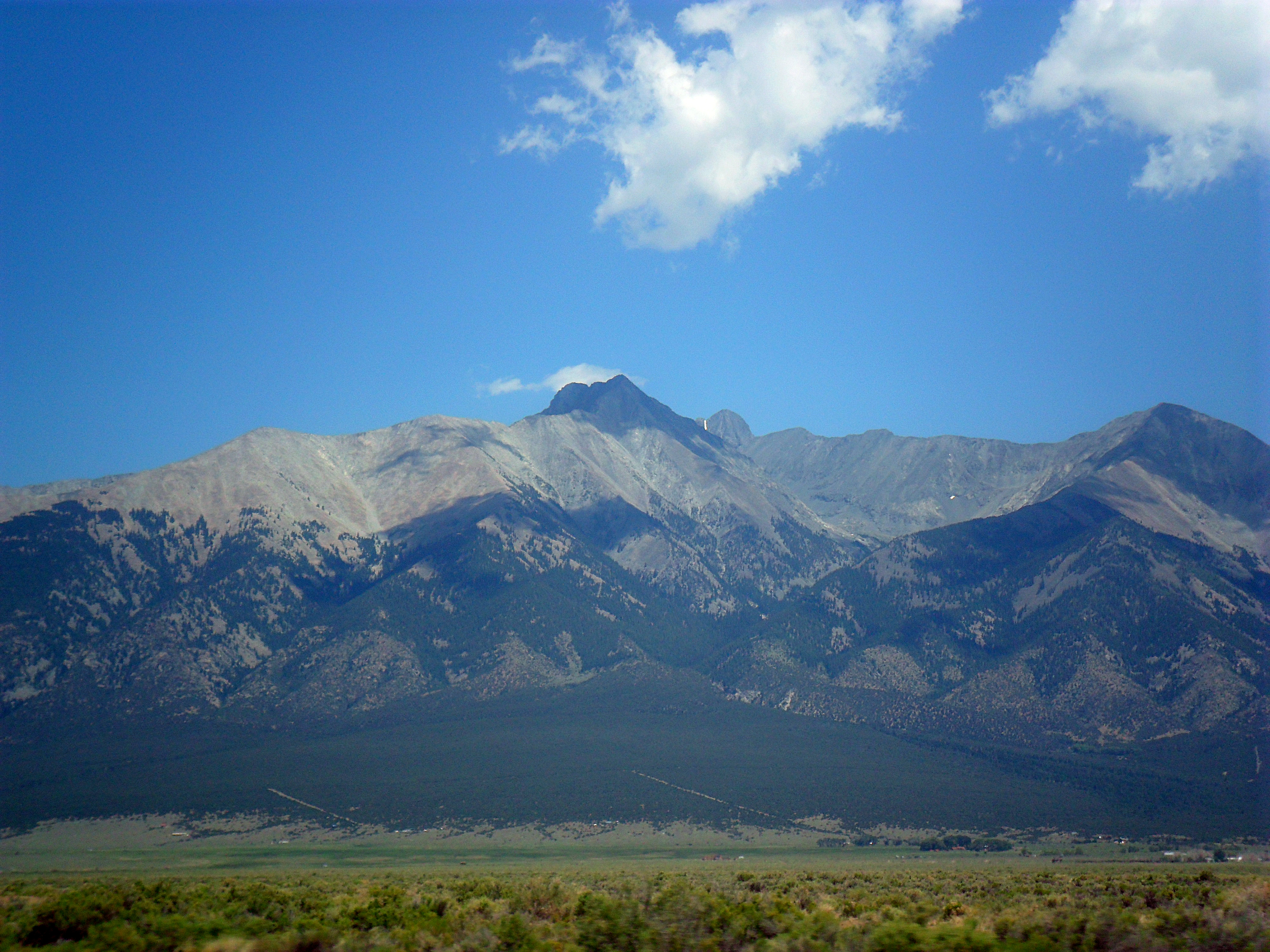
Blanca Peak, Colorado

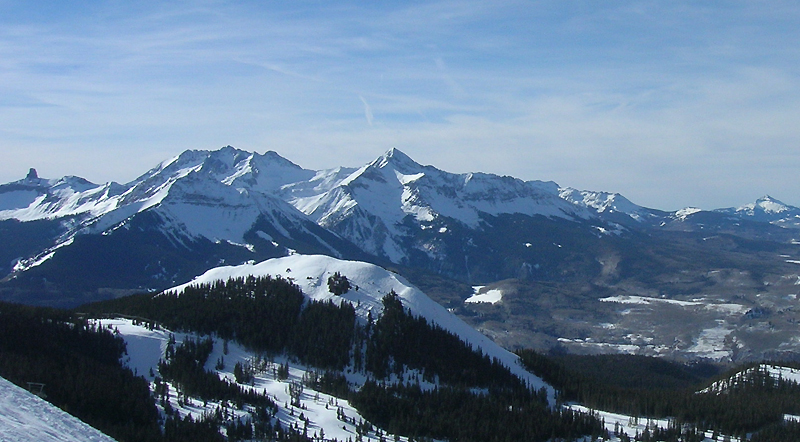
Wilson Peak, Colorado

== See also ==
- List of mountain peaks of North America
  - List of mountain peaks of Greenland
  - List of mountain peaks of Canada
  - List of mountain peaks of the Rocky Mountains
  - List of mountain peaks of the United States
    - List of the highest major summits of the United States
    - List of the most prominent summits of the United States
    - List of the most isolated major summits of the United States
    - List of extreme summits of the United States
    - List of mountain peaks of Alaska
    - List of mountain peaks of California
    - List of mountain peaks of Colorado
    - List of mountain peaks of Hawaiʻi
    - List of mountain peaks of Montana
    - List of mountain peaks of Nevada
    - List of mountain peaks of Utah
    - List of mountain peaks of Washington (state)
    - List of mountain peaks of Wyoming
  - List of mountain peaks of México
  - List of mountain peaks of Central America
  - List of mountain peaks of the Caribbean
- United States of America
  - Geography of the United States
  - Geology of the United States
    - Category:Mountains of the United States
      - commons:Category:Mountains of the United States
- Physical geography
- Eight-thousander, peak with at least 8,000 m. elevation
