= Mount Sill =

Mountain of the Sierra Nevada in California, United States

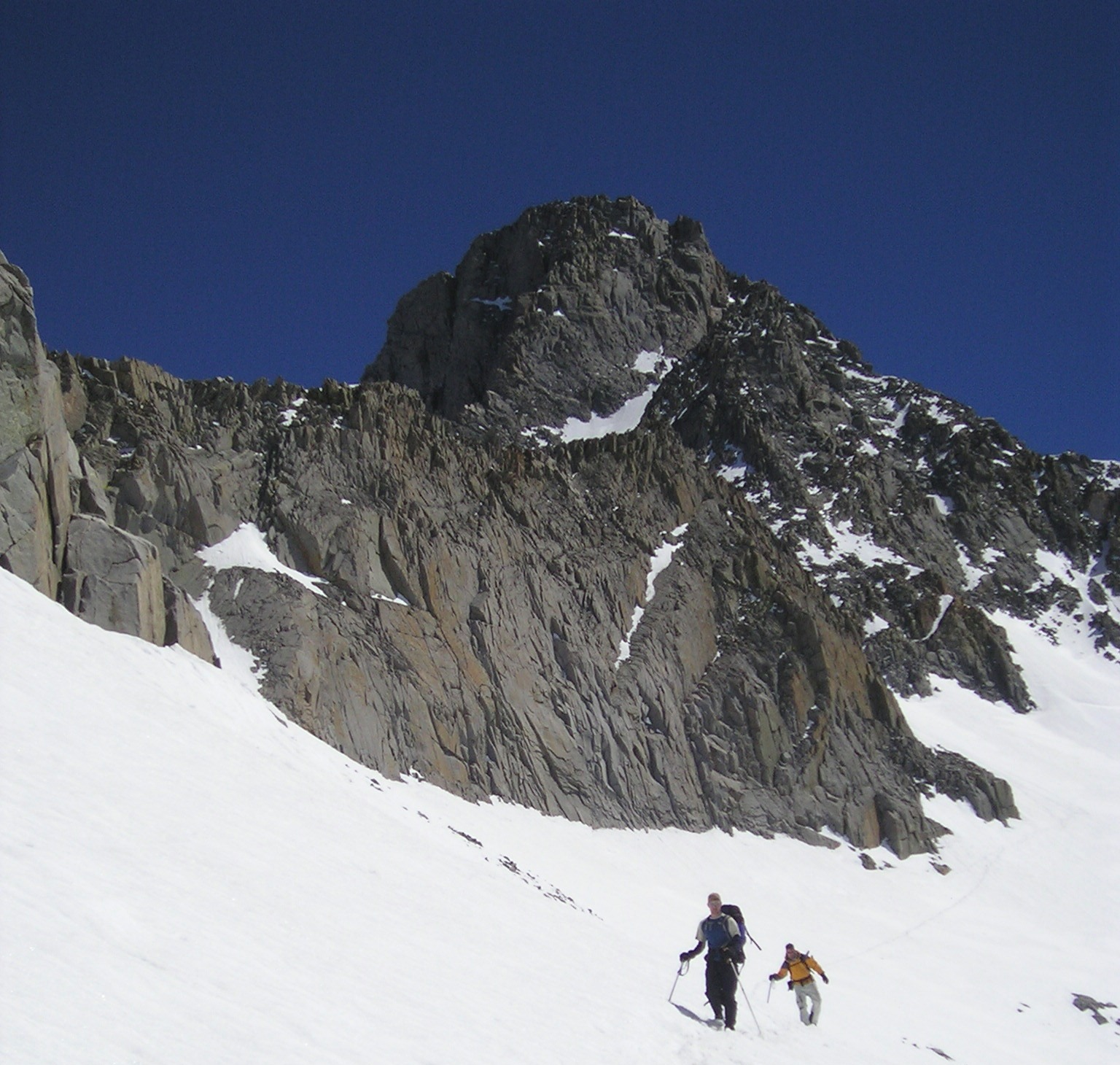
- Climbers on the snow field below Mount Sill, July 2006.

Highest point
- Elevation: 14,159 ft (4,316 m) NAVD 88
- Prominence: 353 ft (108 m)
- Parent peak: North Palisade
- Listing: California fourteeners 6th; SPS Mountaineers peak; Western States Climbers Star peak
- Coordinates: 37°05′46″N 118°30′13″W

Geography
- Location within California
- Location: Fresno and Inyo counties, California, U.S.
- Parent range: Sierra Nevada
- Topo map: USGS North Palisade

Climbing
- First ascent: July 24, 1903 by James S. Hutchinson, Joseph N. LeConte, James Moffitt, Robert Pike
- Easiest route: Glacier climb & rock scramble

Mount Sill is one of the fourteeners of the Sierra Nevada in California. It is located in the Palisades, a group of prominent rock peaks with a few small glaciers on their flanks. Mount Sill is located 0.6 miles (1 km) east of North Palisade, the high point of the group. The two peaks are connected by a high, rocky ridge, on the north side of which lies the Palisade Glacier. Mount Sill lies on the main Sierra Crest, but is at a point where the crest turns sharply, giving it particularly striking summit views. On one side is Kings Canyon National Park and Fresno County; on the other is the John Muir Wilderness, Inyo National Forest and Inyo County.

Routes on Mount Sill are found on all sides of the peak and range in difficulty from scrambles (class 2-3) to a moderately technical rock climbs (class 5.7).

The mountain is called Nen-i-mish ("the Guardian of the Valley") by the Indigenous Northern Paiute people. Its English name was coined, in 1904, by Joseph LeConte, a noted mountaineer, in honor of American poet Edward Rowland Sill.

== See also ==
- List of California fourteeners
- The Palisades of the Sierra Nevada
- Mount Gayley
