= North Palisade =

Mountain in California, United States

- Starlight Peak
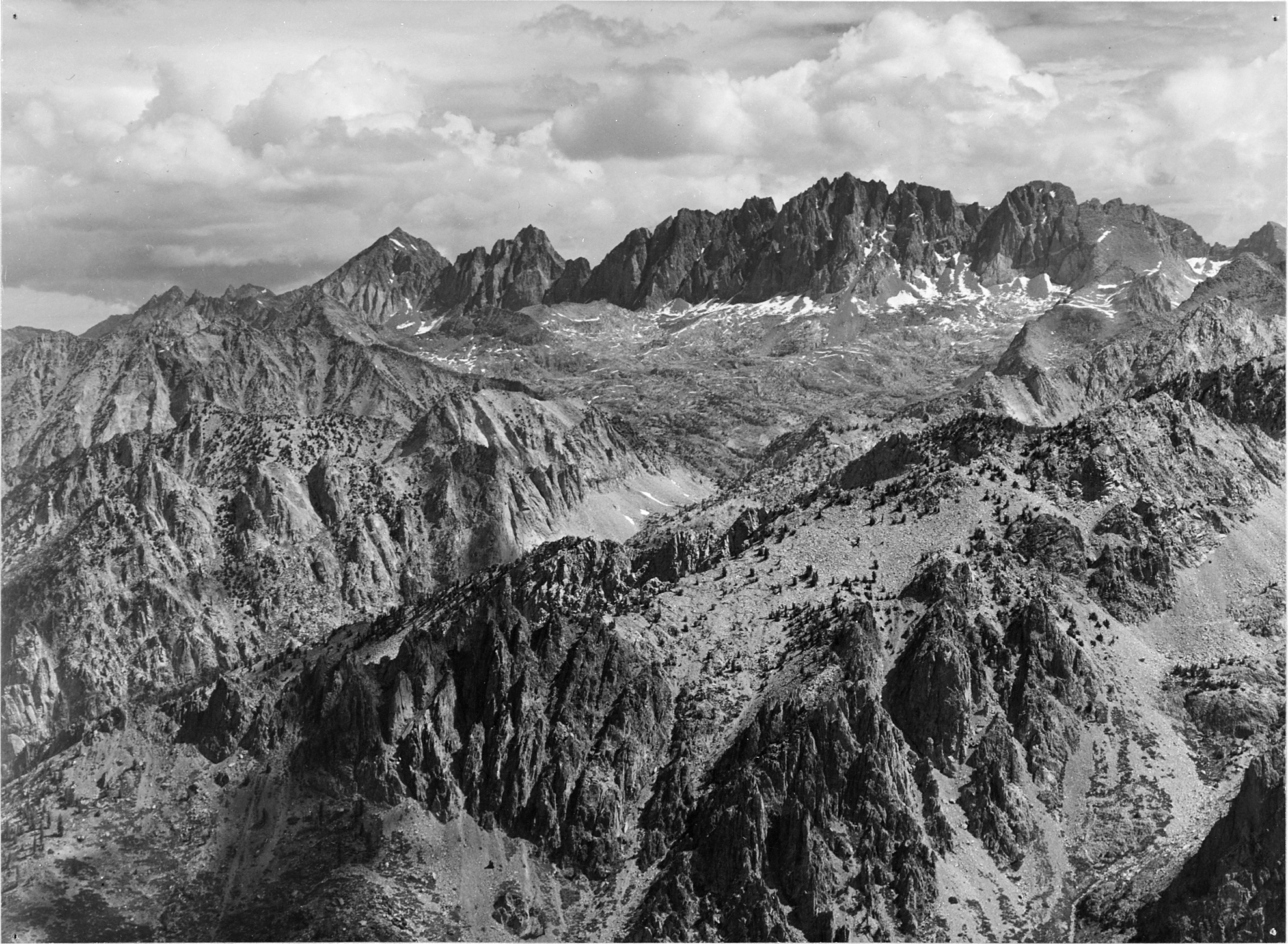
- North Palisade from Windy Point (by Ansel Adams, 1936)

Highest point
- Elevation: 14,248 ft (4,343 m); NAVD88
- Prominence: 2,894 ft (882 m)
- Parent peak: Mount Whitney
- Isolation: 32.2 mi (51.8 km)
- Listing: North America highest peaks 45th; US highest major peaks 31st; California highest major peaks 4th; California fourteeners 4th; California county high points 4th; SPS Emblem peak; Western States Climbers peak
- Coordinates: 37°05′39″N 118°30′52″W

Geography
- Location within California
- Location: Fresno County, California, U.S.
- Parent range: Sierra Nevada, The Palisades
- Topo map: USGS North Palisade Quadrangle

Geology
- Mountain type(s): Igneous, primarily diorite

Climbing
- First ascent: July 25, 1903 by James S. Hutchinson, Joseph N. LeConte, James K. Moffitt
- Easiest route: The LeConte Route, class 4

North Palisade is the third-highest mountain in the Sierra Nevada range of California, and one of the state's small number of peaks over 14,000 feet, known as fourteeners. It is the highest peak of the Palisades group of peaks in the central part of the Sierra range. It sports a small glacier (the Palisade Glacier) and several highly prized rock climbing routes on its northeast side.

== History ==
North Palisade has a collection of names from the 19th century. The Wheeler Survey referred to it as Northwest Palisade in 1878. The following year, Lilbourne A. Winchell called it Dusy's Peak after local rancher Frank Dusy. In 1895, Bolton Brown advocated yet another name, after David Starr Jordan. In 2009, U.S. Senator Dianne Feinstein, supported by U.S. Senator Barbara Boxer, introduced legislation to rename the peak as "Brower Palisade", in honor of environmentalist David Brower. There was significant opposition to this proposal.

The first ascent was made on July 25, 1903, by James S. Hutchinson, Joseph Nisbet LeConte and James K. Moffitt. They approached the area overland from south of the Palisades, and scouted possible routes from the summits of Marion Peak and Mount Sill. Armed with this intelligence, they planned to ascend the southwest chute of the U Notch, and find a way to bypass the rock face between the notch and the upper reaches of North Palisade. Around 13,100 feet (4,000 m), they followed a northward branch of this chute, and slowly climbed a difficult system of cracks. From here they found a catwalk ledge that took them to a series of icy gullies, bound toward the summit. These gullies were blocked by a pair of chockstones, requiring class 4 moves to pass. Beyond these obstacles, they crested the southeast ridge, and climbed a series of granite blocks to the summit.

After making this climb, LeConte is quoted as writing in a letter, "I have called the peak merely the North Palisade. Put Dusy's name on some less imposing mass, and give us a name to be handed down through all time." The peak has been called North Palisade since that day, and received official recognition by the U.S. Board on Geographic Names.

== Subsidiary peaks ==
North Palisade has several named subsidiary peaks (nearby peaks which have less than 300 ft (91 m) of topographic prominence). These all lie on the main ridge crest, and are as follows:

- Polemonium Peak, 14,080+ ft (4,294+ m). Prominence of 160 feet (49 m). This lies between the "U-Notch" and "V-Notch" couloirs (popular snow/ice climbs), 0.15 mi (0.25 km) east-southeast of North Palisade. Named on the USGS topographic map. The peak is named for the Polemonium eximium skypilot (plant) found in the area.
- Starlight Peak, 14,200 feet (4,328 m). Prominence of 80 feet (24 m). This is the northwest summit of North Palisade, less than 0.1 mi (0.15 km) from the main summit. Some climbing routes end atop this peak known for its famous "Milk Bottle", a 20 ft (6.1 m) pillar of rock with huge exposure (class 5.6).
- Thunderbolt Peak, 14,003 feet (4,268 m). Prominence of 203 feet (62 m). About 0.25 mi (0.4 km) northwest of North Palisade. Named on the USGS topographic map. The Sierra Club guidebook notes: "This was the last 14,000 foot (4,267 m) peak to be climbed in the Sierra. During a wild storm on the first ascent, a bolt of lightning left Jules Eichorn severely shaken; hence the name".

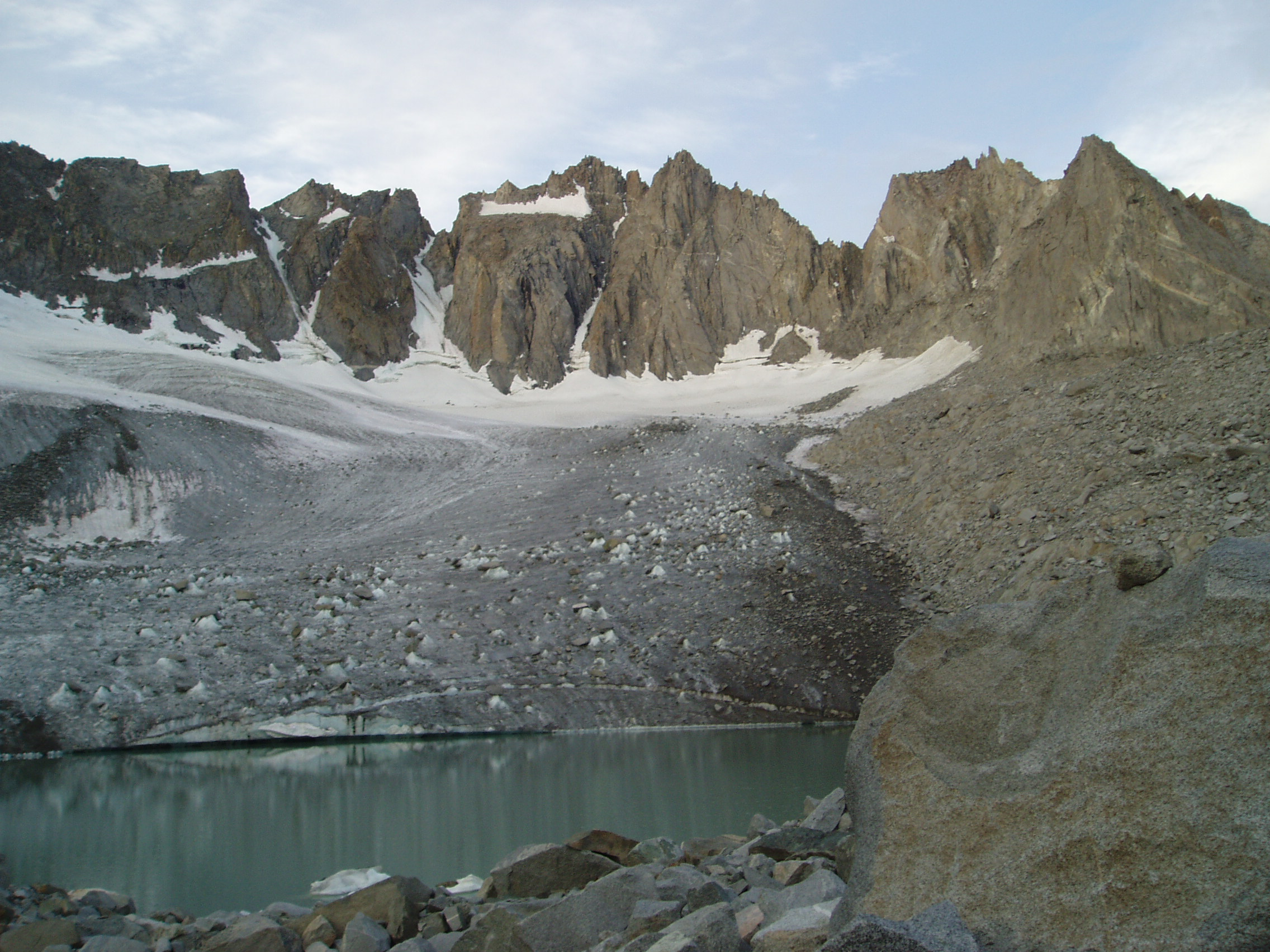
Thunderbolt, Starlight, North Palisade, and Polemonium Peaks

== Climate ==
There is no weather station at the summit, but this climate table contains interpolated data for an area around the summit. The peak of North Palisade has an Alpine climate (ET).

Climate data for North Palisade 37.0914 N, 118.5081 W, Elevation: 13,494 ft (4,113 m) (1991–2020 normals)
| Month | Jan | Feb | Mar | Apr | May | Jun | Jul | Aug | Sep | Oct | Nov | Dec | Year |
|---|---|---|---|---|---|---|---|---|---|---|---|---|---|
| Mean daily maximum °F (°C) | 25.3 (−3.7) | 23.6 (−4.7) | 26.5 (−3.1) | 31.1 (−0.5) | 38.5 (3.6) | 48.1 (8.9) | 54.4 (12.4) | 53.7 (12.1) | 48.6 (9.2) | 40.3 (4.6) | 31.8 (−0.1) | 25.0 (−3.9) | 37.2 (2.9) |
| Daily mean °F (°C) | 15.5 (−9.2) | 13.5 (−10.3) | 15.9 (−8.9) | 19.4 (−7.0) | 25.9 (−3.4) | 34.9 (1.6) | 41.5 (5.3) | 40.6 (4.8) | 35.6 (2.0) | 28.4 (−2.0) | 21.6 (−5.8) | 15.7 (−9.1) | 25.7 (−3.5) |
| Mean daily minimum °F (°C) | 5.8 (−14.6) | 3.4 (−15.9) | 5.3 (−14.8) | 7.7 (−13.5) | 13.4 (−10.3) | 21.8 (−5.7) | 28.6 (−1.9) | 27.6 (−2.4) | 22.7 (−5.2) | 16.5 (−8.6) | 11.4 (−11.4) | 6.3 (−14.3) | 14.2 (−9.9) |
| Average precipitation inches (mm) | 8.89 (226) | 7.32 (186) | 6.42 (163) | 4.25 (108) | 2.09 (53) | 0.53 (13) | 0.32 (8.1) | 0.18 (4.6) | 0.31 (7.9) | 2.02 (51) | 2.76 (70) | 7.98 (203) | 43.07 (1,093.6) |
Source: PRISM Climate Group

== See also ==
- List of mountain peaks of California
- List of highest points in California by county
- The Palisades of the Sierra Nevada
- List of California fourteeners
