= Aello Peak =

Mountain in the state of Alaska

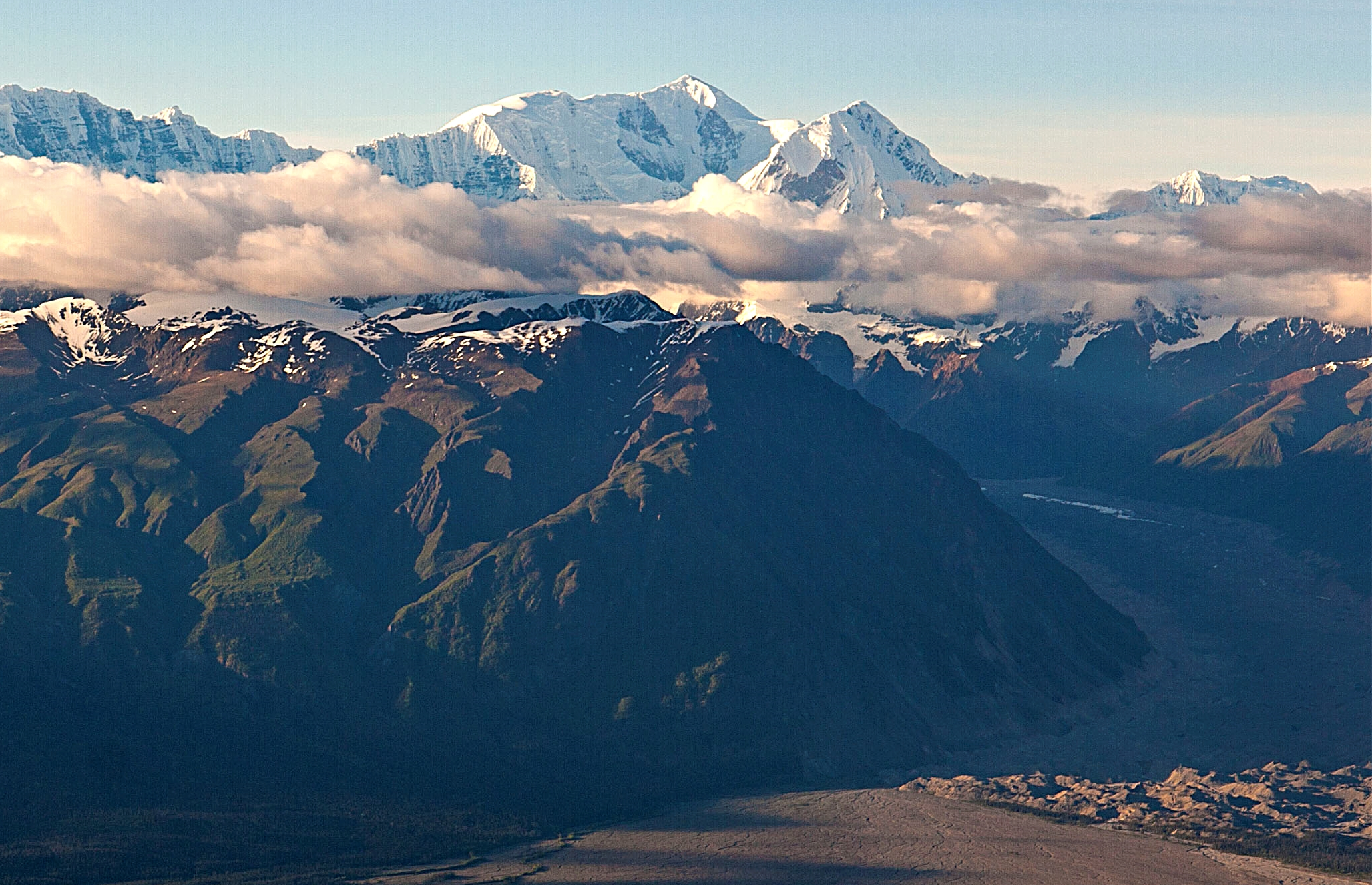
- Severozápadní část pohoří svatého Eliáše

Highest point
- Elevation: 14,445 ft (4,403 m) NGVD 29
- Prominence: 1,445 ft (440 m)
- Coordinates: 61°21′55″N 141°53′55″W

Geography
- Location within Alaska
- Location: Valdez-Cordova Census Area, Alaska, U.S.
- Parent range: Saint Elias Mountains
- Topo map: USGS McCarthy B-3

Climbing
- First ascent: 1967 by Benton, Boulton, Hagihara, Matsumoto, McBee, Ono, Randall, Staley
- Easiest route: Snow and glacier climb

Aello Peak is the highest peak of a mountain group called The Twaharpies, just west of Mount Bona in the Saint Elias Mountains of Alaska. While not highly significant in terms of prominence or isolation (it is just 5 miles (8 km) west of the summit of Mount Bona), it has a tremendous south face. From the summit, this face drops 7,000 feet (2,130 m) in just over 1 mile (1.6 km), and 8,500 feet (2,590 m) in less than 2.5 miles (4.0 km). In terms of vertical relief and steepness, this is one of the major faces in North America.

The Twaharpies also include two other named summits, Ocypete Peak and Celeno Peak, to the southwest of Aello Peak. Other summits of the Mount Bona massif include University Peak, also a peak with huge, steep relief, and Mount Churchill, a higher but much gentler peak.
