= Mount Langley =

Mountain in California, United States

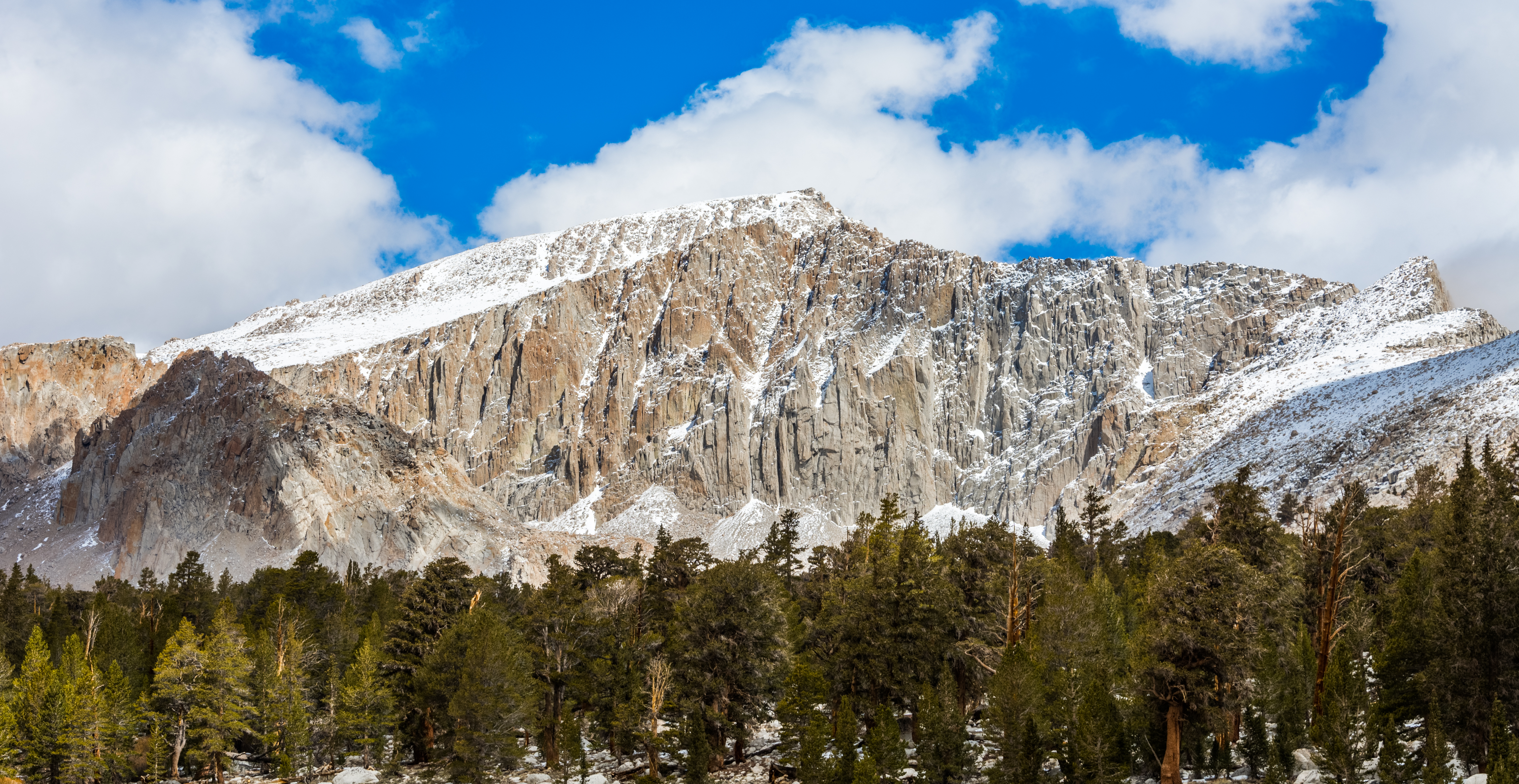

Highest point
- Elevation: 14,032 ft (4,277 m) NAVD 88
- Prominence: 1,165 ft (355 m)
- Parent peak: Mount Whitney
- Listing: California fourteeners 9th; Sierra Peaks Section; Western States Climbers Star peak; Vagmarken Sierra Crest List
- Coordinates: 36°31′24″N 118°14′20″W

Geography
- Location within California
- Location: Inyo and Tulare counties, California, U.S.
- Parent range: Sierra Nevada
- Topo map: USGS Mount Langley

Climbing
- First ascent: Unknown, but prior to 1871
- Easiest route: Hike from New Army Pass on the south, class 1

Mount Langley is a mountain located on the crest of the Sierra Nevada, on the boundary between Inyo and Tulare counties in eastern California, in the United States. To the east is the Owens Valley, and to the west is the Kern River Valley. It is the ninth-highest peak in the state and the seventh-highest in the Sierra. Mount Whitney, the highest peak in the contiguous United States, lies 4.8 miles (7.7 km) to the northwest. Mount Langley also has the distinction of being the southernmost fourteener in the United States.

== History ==
Today, the mountain is named after Samuel Pierpont Langley. In the early 1870s, it was confused with Mount Whitney by early climbers, and called by this name. When the mistake was realized, the peak was alternately called Mount Corcoran, Cirque Peak, or Sheep Mountain; the former two names being later attached to other mountains. But its current name became established in local usage, and was made official by the Board on Geographic Names in 1943.

== Climbing ==
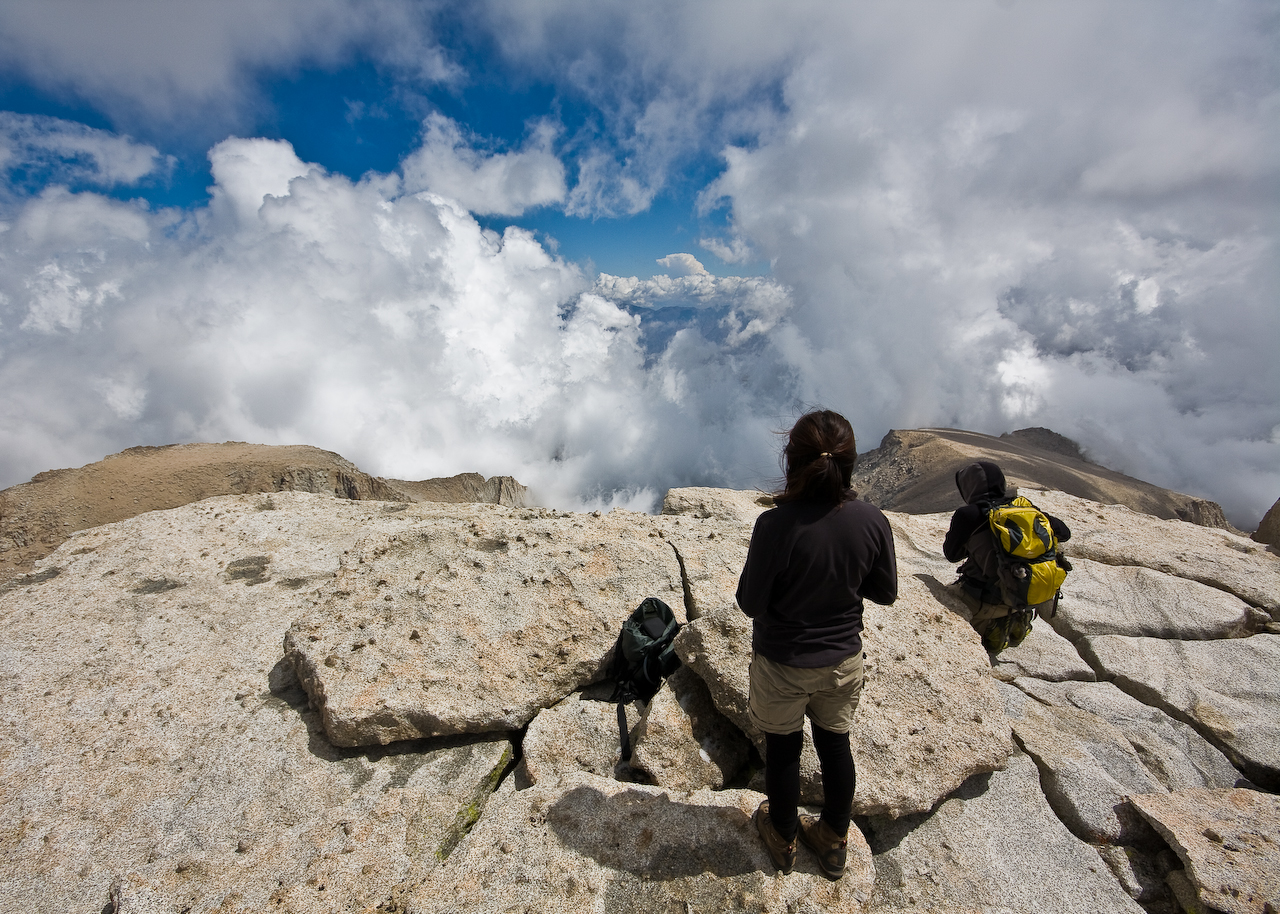
View of buttes from summit

Mount Langley is one of the easiest of California's fourteeners to climb. A hiking trail starts at nearby Horseshoe Meadow, at an elevation of about 10,000 feet (3,048 m), passes scenic Cottonwood Lakes, and climbs through New Army Pass. From there hikers travel cross-country to Old Army Pass, where they may pick up the recently constructed Class 1 Mount Langley Trail, which follows a series of large rock cairns for the two mile push to the summit. New Army Pass is 7 miles (11 km) from the trailhead at Horseshoe Meadow and is an easier but longer approach to Langley than Old Army Pass via Cottonwood Lakes Trail.

Due to the elevation, both passes are covered with snow most of the year. New Army Pass sits on a south-facing slope and it tends to clear of snow somewhat earlier in the season. Old Army Pass is only clear of snow for less than two months per year, from mid-August to early October. During the winter months, even the paved road to Horseshoe Meadow is closed, making the summit significantly harder to reach.

The first recorded climb of the mountain was in 1871 by Clarence King and the French mountaineer Paul Pinson.

William Bellows made the first recorded ascent in 1864. https://www.mountainproject.com/area/105877608/mount-langley

== Climate ==
Climate data for Mount Langley 36.5192 N, 118.2388 W, Elevation: 13,159 ft (4,011 m) (1991–2020 normals)
| Month | Jan | Feb | Mar | Apr | May | Jun | Jul | Aug | Sep | Oct | Nov | Dec | Year |
|---|---|---|---|---|---|---|---|---|---|---|---|---|---|
| Mean daily maximum °F (°C) | 26.3 (−3.2) | 25.1 (−3.8) | 28.0 (−2.2) | 32.8 (0.4) | 40.3 (4.6) | 50.5 (10.3) | 56.8 (13.8) | 55.9 (13.3) | 50.8 (10.4) | 43.0 (6.1) | 33.1 (0.6) | 26.3 (−3.2) | 39.1 (3.9) |
| Daily mean °F (°C) | 17.1 (−8.3) | 15.3 (−9.3) | 17.8 (−7.9) | 21.8 (−5.7) | 27.7 (−2.4) | 36.9 (2.7) | 42.9 (6.1) | 42.1 (5.6) | 38.2 (3.4) | 31.4 (−0.3) | 23.5 (−4.7) | 17.3 (−8.2) | 27.7 (−2.4) |
| Mean daily minimum °F (°C) | 7.8 (−13.4) | 5.5 (−14.7) | 7.7 (−13.5) | 10.8 (−11.8) | 15.1 (−9.4) | 23.3 (−4.8) | 28.9 (−1.7) | 28.2 (−2.1) | 25.5 (−3.6) | 19.8 (−6.8) | 13.9 (−10.1) | 8.3 (−13.2) | 16.2 (−8.8) |
| Average precipitation inches (mm) | 8.48 (215) | 7.04 (179) | 6.08 (154) | 4.08 (104) | 1.49 (38) | 0.45 (11) | 0.43 (11) | 0.25 (6.4) | 0.35 (8.9) | 1.92 (49) | 2.55 (65) | 8.00 (203) | 41.12 (1,044.3) |
Source: PRISM Climate Group

== Climbing Without a Trail ==
=== Cross-Country Routes: Western Sierra Nevada ===
There are basically two ways of summiting Mount Langley from the west (from the Kern River drainage):

CLASS 2: via the Soldier Lake trail, connect with the main Mount Langley trail (where New Army and Old Army pass trails converge) that navigates the south-west side of Mt. Langley using large stone cairns built by the NPS to consolidate many use-trails into a single trail;

CLASS 4: take the Rock Creek trail (near Erin Lake and Sky Blue Lake), navigate cross-country, due east, to Tuttle Pass (the start of Tuttle Creek on the Sierra Crest) and climb the north face of Mount Langley which is class 4.

=== Cross-Country Routes: Eastern Sierra Nevada ===
Routes are listed in this section from South to North:

Starting at 11,420 feet (3480 meters) is the "Thompson Pass Route." This route begins from the Muir Lake trail, passes besides Cottonwood Lake No. 6, and goes up the canyon to the west which accesses the Sierra Crest just above peak x3915. The top of the canyon isn't as steep as it appears from Lake No. 6, and from there is an easy hike using the Army Pass trail to the summit. (Watchout for a cornice that may form in winter by wind blowing from West to East over the Sierra Crest.)

Starting around 10,400 feet (3170m) is what may be called the "Woollyback Route" (Wooleyback). About 0.2 miles North-west of Thatcher School's Golden Trout Encampment (summer school campus with four buildings), the main trail crosses Cottonwood Creek. Leave the trail and head North until the terrain is open (without tree "cover"). Head West towards The Wollyback (peak x3913), which is the only one in the area with a broad, rounded summit. Continue West to the top of a "fin" (peak x3878). Make a technical rappel with ropes off the "fin" (not down the "fin," just down to the pass between Cottonwood Lake No. 6 and Diaz Creek), into the Diaz Creek drainage, then up to Diaz Pass to connect with the main trail to Mt. Langley.

These routes begin in Owens Valley:

Starting around 5,900 feet (1800m) is a route up Diaz Creek to Diaz Pass and the main trail to the summit. This was the route that sheep herders once used for grazing their animals in the Western Sierra. Park either in the Granite View Drive neighborhood, or on the 4WD dirt road that parallels Lubken Creek off of Horseshoe Meadow Road.

Also starting around 5,900 feet (1800m) from the same hill used to start the Diaz Creek route is route "High Above the Fray." This is a 100% ridge route that goes West to peak x3153 (on the boundary of John Muir Wilderness) then continues West and slightly South to the summit with a gain of approximately 8,000 feet. It is parallel and just north of the Diaz Creek route which is a 100% creek route. (To reach peak x3153 much more easily, use the large gully/basin/couloir half-way between Tuttle and Diaz Creeks.) Climb the East face of Mt. Langley to stay 100% on the East ridge, or use the main trail from Diaz Pass.

Starting from a parking spot around 6,400 feet (1950m) is a route up a side creek/canyon on the south side of So. Fork Tuttle Creek. Park at 6,400 feet next to a large tree in the middle of a loop off the dirt road that passes along the south side of Tuttle Creek (use Granite View Road). Some 4WD vehicles can make it to the boulders across the road shortly before the John Muir Wilderness sign. Take the trail towards the Tuttle Creek Stone House (or "Ashram"), but where there was a bridge crossing So. Fork Tuttle Creek, leave the trail and navigate up the Creek. Find the side creek with a spring marked on the 7.5" MT LANGLEY topo map at 8,460 feet (2580m). Above this spring the stream is under-ground. Nearby is a waterfall which may be circumvented to the right or left. A dotted-line trail is seen on some (older) maps up the side canyon which reaches the East ridge of Mt. Langley around 11,800 feet (3600m). Continue West to Diaz Pass and the main trail.

Finally, this list ends with a variation of the above: take the So. Fork of Tuttle Creek all the way up to the Sierra Crest (Tuttle Pass). Use a Class 4 route to the summit.

== Topographic Maps ==
The United States Government provides free PDF maps for download. Double-click on the map seen at the map locator and filter by map scale, if necessary.

Mount Langley is positioned in the lower-left corner of map 7.5" (1:24,000) MT. LANGLEY, CA (Note: product/45962 is the same PDF as product/842850 according to GNU/Linux 'cmp' command, however the print copies are different prices as of 2026-02Feb-18). Therefore, the area surrounding the mountain is spread across four (4) 7.5" maps. The second 7.5" map (to the west) is MT. WHITNEY, CA, including all the lakes surrounding that peak. The third map (to the south-west) is JOHNSON PEAK, CA which includes the gentler terrain of Rock Creek basin. The fourth and last map (to the south) is CIRQUE PEAK, CA, and would be good to carry along with MT. LANGLEY because it includes the Cottonwood Lakes drainage and the parking lot at the end of Horseshoe Meadows Road.

Mount Langley is also positioned in the extreme lower-left corner of map 15" (1:62,500) LONE PINE, CALIF. (Note: product/845470 is a slightly different map of the same area).

The paper copy of a map can be ordered from the U.S.G.S. or, possibily, found in the map collection at the hardware store in Lone Pine, CA. Maps may be laminated using clear packing tape available from USPS Post Offices, at a reasonable price, which is both flexible and very sticky. Strips of tape can cover the map and over-lap by a fraction of an inch, making the map essentially water-proof when folded with the non-laminated side on the inside.

== See also ==
- List of mountain peaks of California
- List of California fourteeners
- "Mount Langley Climbing" at website MOUNTAIN PROJECT.
- "Mount Langley, California" at website PEAKBAGGER.
- "Mount Langley" at website SUMMITPOST
- "Hiking Mt Langley" at website SCARUFFI
