= Mount Tyndall =

Mountain in the state of California

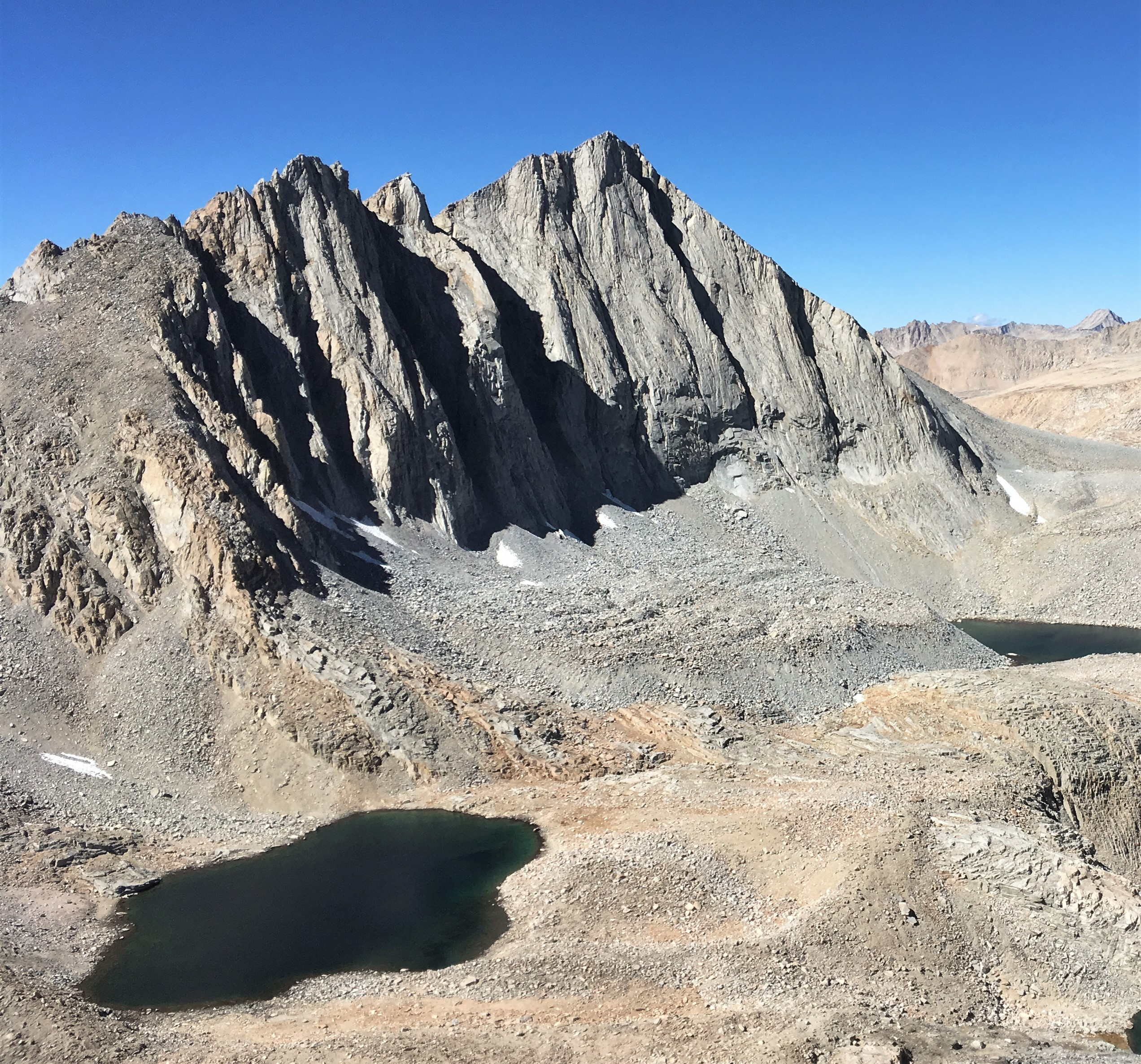
- East aspect

Highest point
- Elevation: 14,025 ft (4,275 m) NAVD 88
- Prominence: 1,092 ft (333 m)
- Parent peak: Mount Williamson
- Listing: California fourteeners 10th; Sierra Peaks Section; John Muir Wilderness Area; Western States Climbers Star peak
- Coordinates: 36°39′21″N 118°20′14″W

Geography
- Location within California Location within the United States
- Location: Sequoia National Park; John Muir Wilderness Area; Inyo / Tulare counties, California, U.S.
- Parent range: Sierra Nevada
- Topo map: USGS Mount Williamson

Climbing
- First ascent: July 6, 1864 by Clarence King and Richard Cotter
- Easiest route: Scramble, class 2

Mount Tyndall is a peak in the Mount Whitney region of the Sierra Nevada in the U.S. state of California. At 14,025 feet (4,275 m), it is the tenth highest peak in the state. The mountain was named in honor of the Irish scientist and mountaineer, John Tyndall.

== Geography ==
Mt. Tyndall as seen from nearby Mt. Williamson

Tyndall lies on the Sierra Crest, which in this region forms the boundary between the John Muir Wilderness and the Inyo National Forest on the east, and Sequoia National Park on the west; and the boundary between Inyo and Tulare counties. Mount Tyndall is 1.5 miles (2.4 km) west of the higher Mount Williamson, and about 6 miles (9.7 km) north-northeast of Mount Whitney. The popular Pacific Crest Trail and John Muir Trail routes pass by about 2.7 miles (4.3 km) west of the peak.

== History ==
Mount Tyndall was first climbed on July 6, 1864, by Clarence King and Richard Cotter who were members of the California Geological Survey and under the overall direction of Josiah Whitney and the field leadership of William Brewer. King and Cotter were attempting to make the first ascent of Mount Whitney, and had made a long trek from Kings Canyon, only to realize months later that they had climbed the wrong peak.

== Climbing routes ==
The easiest route on Mount Tyndall in terms of access and climbing is the Northwest Ridge, which involves an easy scramble (class 2). It begins about one half mile (0.8 km) west of Shepherd Pass and about 1 mile (1.6 km) north of the peak. Other non-technical routes exist on the gently sloped west side of the peak. At least two significant technical routes lie on the much steeper east face; the first of these routes was climbed by noted mountaineer Fred Beckey and Charlie Raymond in 1970.

== See also ==
- List of California fourteeners
