= Mount Williamson =

Mountain in California, United States

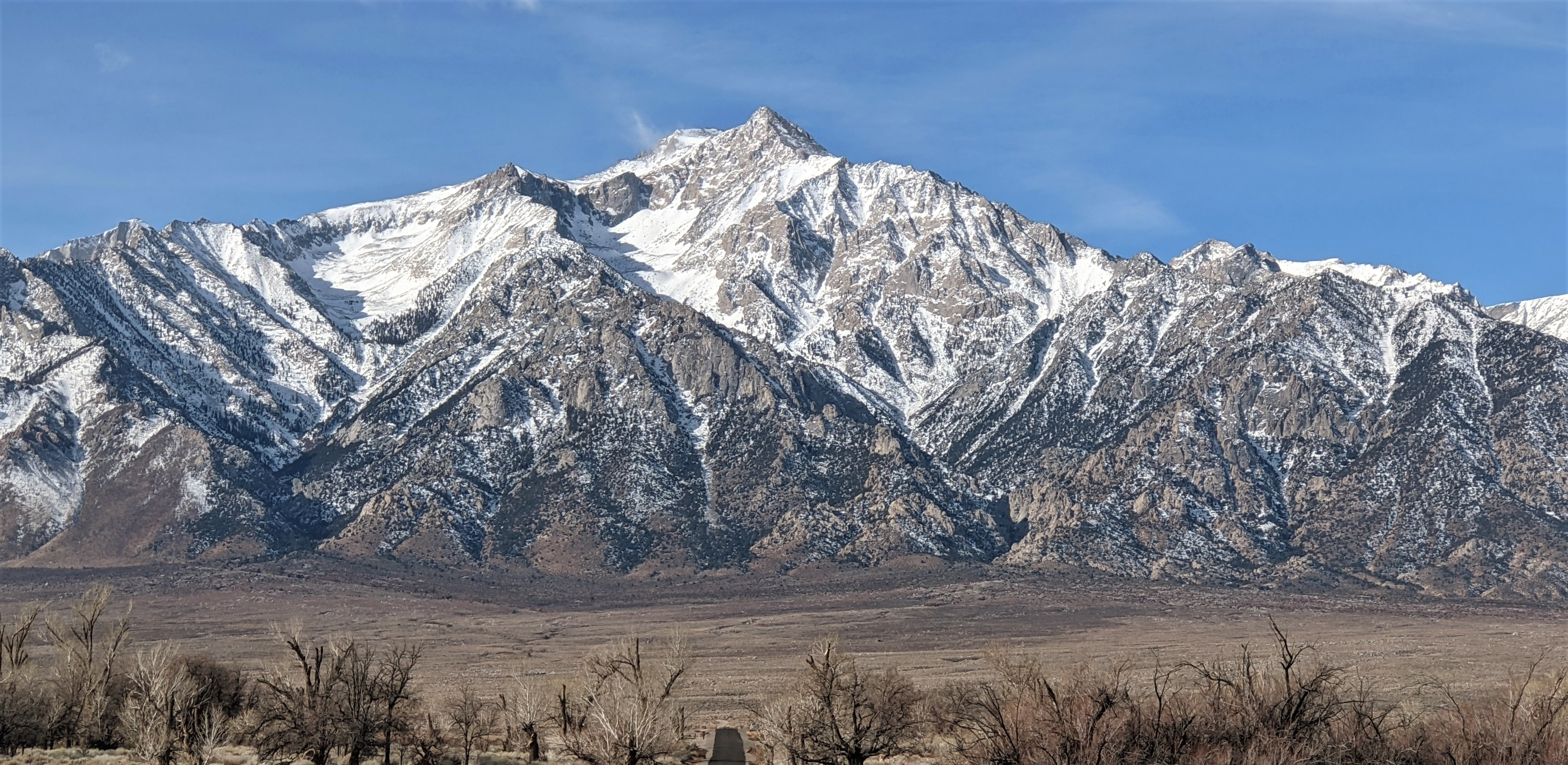
- Mount Williamson as seen from Manzanar in the Owens Valley

Highest point
- Elevation: 14,379 ft (4,383 m) NAVD 88
- Prominence: 1,643 ft (501 m)
- Parent peak: Mount Whitney
- Isolation: 5.44 mi (8.75 km)
- Listing: North America highest peaks 31st; U.S. highest major peaks 18th; California highest major peaks 2nd; California fourteeners 2nd; SPS Emblem peak; Western States Climbers Star peak
- Coordinates: 36°39′22″N 118°18′40″W

Geography
- Location within California
- Location: Inyo County, California, U.S.
- Parent range: Sierra Nevada
- Topo map: USGS Mount Williamson

Climbing
- First ascent: 1884 by William L. Hunter and C. Mulholland
- Easiest route: Southeast face from George Creek, easy scramble, class 2

Mount Williamson, at an elevation of 14,379 feet (4,383 m), is the second-highest mountain in both the Sierra Nevada range and the state of California, and the sixth-highest peak in the contiguous United States.

== Geography ==
Williamson stands in the John Muir Wilderness of the Inyo National Forest. It is located approximately 6 miles (10 km) north of Mount Whitney, the highest peak in the contiguous U.S., and about 2.5 miles (4 km) southwest of Shepherd Pass, the nearest trail access. The closest town is Independence, California, about 12 miles (19 km) to the north-north-east. It lies about 1 mile (1.6 km) east of the Sierra Crest, which forms the western edge of the Owens Valley. It is more remote than Whitney in terms of access; however, as it sits east of the crest, it is actually a bit closer to the Owens Valley floor than Whitney. For example, the drop from the summit to the forest edge is 8,000 feet (2,400 m) in approximately 4 miles (6.4 km). This makes it an imposing mountain, and a much less popular climb than its higher neighbor.

=== Climate ===
Climate data for Mount Williamson 36.6570 N, 118.3108 W, Elevation: 13,780 ft (4,200 m) (1991–2020 normals)
| Month | Jan | Feb | Mar | Apr | May | Jun | Jul | Aug | Sep | Oct | Nov | Dec | Year |
|---|---|---|---|---|---|---|---|---|---|---|---|---|---|
| Mean daily maximum °F (°C) | 23.4 (−4.8) | 20.8 (−6.2) | 24.4 (−4.2) | 30.2 (−1.0) | 38.1 (3.4) | 48.6 (9.2) | 55.5 (13.1) | 54.6 (12.6) | 49.4 (9.7) | 40.8 (4.9) | 29.9 (−1.2) | 23.9 (−4.5) | 36.6 (2.6) |
| Daily mean °F (°C) | 15.5 (−9.2) | 12.9 (−10.6) | 16.2 (−8.8) | 18.1 (−7.7) | 25.2 (−3.8) | 34.7 (1.5) | 41.1 (5.1) | 40.2 (4.6) | 38.8 (3.8) | 28.1 (−2.2) | 21.8 (−5.7) | 15.5 (−9.2) | 25.7 (−3.5) |
| Mean daily minimum °F (°C) | 7.7 (−13.5) | 5.0 (−15.0) | 7.9 (−13.4) | 5.9 (−14.5) | 12.3 (−10.9) | 20.7 (−6.3) | 26.6 (−3.0) | 25.9 (−3.4) | 28.2 (−2.1) | 15.5 (−9.2) | 13.6 (−10.2) | 7.1 (−13.8) | 14.7 (−9.6) |
| Average precipitation inches (mm) | 7.69 (195) | 6.44 (164) | 5.45 (138) | 3.85 (98) | 1.68 (43) | 0.43 (11) | 0.30 (7.6) | 0.22 (5.6) | 0.30 (7.6) | 1.82 (46) | 2.31 (59) | 7.02 (178) | 37.51 (952.8) |
Source: PRISM Climate Group

== History ==
The mountain is named for Lt. Robert Stockton Williamson (1825–1882), who was known for his topographical labors on the Pacific coast, especially Pacific Railroad Surveys in Southern California.

The first recorded ascent of Mount Williamson was made in 1884 by W. L. Hunter and C. Mulholland, by way of the Southeast Slopes Route, although the mountain may have been climbed as early as 1881 by A.H. Johnson and Julius Schroeder. The first ascent of the West Side Route was made in 1896 by Bolton C. Brown and Lucy Brown. New routes continued to be put up on the harder faces at least through the 1980s.

== Climbing ==
The standard ascent route is the West Side Route, accessed from Shepherd's Pass. From the pass, one travels across the Williamson Bowl, which lies between Mount Williamson and Mount Tyndall, part of the Sierra Crest. The bowl is home to five high alpine lakes. From the bowl, the route climbs gullies up the west face to the relatively broad summit plateau; this portion involves scrambling up to class 3. Technically easier, but with a more difficult approach which can involve route finding and bushwhacking, is the Southeast Slopes Route, rising from George Creek. Other routes exist on the mountain, including a significant technical route on the North Rib (Grade IV, 5.7).

Climbing Mount Williamson is made more difficult by the lengthy and strenuous approach. Elevation gain from the trailhead is over 8,000 feet (2,400 m), and the trail to Shepherd's Pass alone is 11 miles (18 km).

Mount Williamson is situated in the California Bighorn Sheep Zoological Area. These rare animals can often be seen on the lower slopes during the winter when heavy snows drive the sheep down from their summer grazing areas. From 1981 until 2010 the California Bighorn Sheep Zoological Area was closed to access for much of the year, but late in 2010, the Inyo National Forest Service declined to renew the closure, opening the area to access year-round.

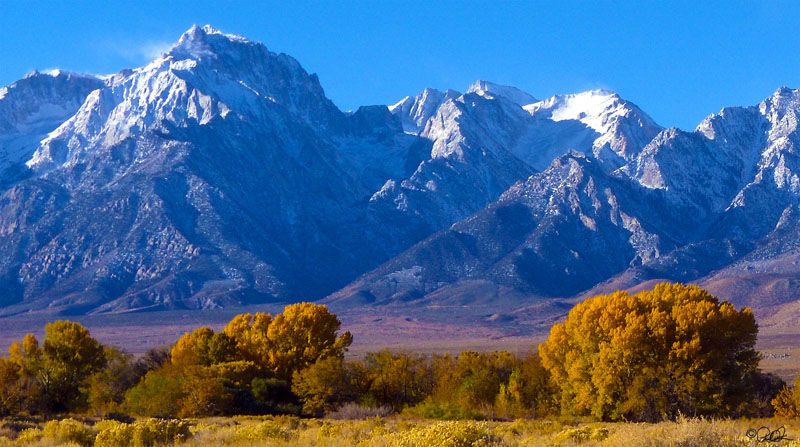
Mount Williamson (center), from near the Independence Airport.

== See also ==
- List of mountain peaks of California
