= Richard D. Cotter =

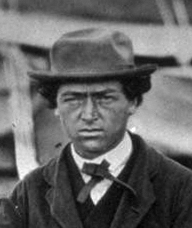
Richard D. Cotter

Richard D. Cotter (September 17, 1842 – March 12, 1927), also known as Dick Cotter and R. D. Cotter, was an Irish-born American member of the first California Geological Survey.

== Biography ==
Richard D. Cotter emigrated from County Cork Ireland to the United States in 1851 with his parents and brothers John and Jerry. There were seven children orphaned at an early age: Richard, John, Jeremiah, Elizabeth Kennedy, Mary Leahey, James and another sister. Cotter and his siblings were taken in from an orphan's home and educated by John C. Sutton, a St. Louis, Missouri blacksmith, farmer and inventor of the Sutton plow.

At the age of 18, Cotter asked Sutton for permission to go west and seek his fortune in the gold mines as some of the Suttons had done. Instead, scouts of the Whitney Surveying party offered him a job and Cotter took a position as packer on the California Geological Survey under Josiah Whitney from 1862 to 1864. Hired as a packer, Cotter did not actually know much about packing, but caught on quickly. Clarence King called Cotter "our man-of-all-work, to whom science already owes its debts". and described him as "Stout of limb, stronger yet in heart, of iron endurance, and a quiet unexcited temperament, and better yet, devoted to me, I felt that Cotter was the one comrade I would choose to face death with, for I believed there was in his manhood no room for fear or shirk." and, "in all my experience of mountaineering I have never known an act of such real, profound courage as this of Cotter's." In the Exploration of the Sierra Nevada, Francis P. Farquhar describes Cotter as, "an indomitable mountain-climber whose Services were of great value in more than one branch of the work". Mount Whitney, the highest mountain in the contiguous states was first discovered in July 1864 by Clarence King and Richard Cotter.

After Cotter completed the mapping in Yosemite late 1864, he signed up to work on the Western Union Telegraph Expedition to British Columbia and Alaska, with the goal of providing a telegraph link from Asia through Alaska by way of Bering Strait. In 1866 Richard Cotter and J.T. Dyer made a very hazardous and successful exploration of the country between Norton Bay and the mouth of the Koyukuk River on the Yukon. Here is Cotter's Report. The project was abandoned in July 1866, when completion of the submarine Transatlantic telegraph cable established a link from the United States to Europe. However, the public interest stimulated by the Alaskan project is credited with influencing the purchase of Alaska from the Russian Empire on March 30, 1867, for $7.2 million.

Cotter then joined Clarence King on the Geological Exploration of the Fortieth Parallel in 1867, resigned after two years and settled in York just outside Helena, Montana. In 1875, he traveled to Washington Territory and kept a short diary.

Among his occupations in York, he had been a Sunday School superintendent, Postmaster, mine owner, Ranch owner and a Justice of the Peace. He also acted as coroner for the murder of William Culp in May 1880.

He spent the last eight years of his life in the county hospital in Helena where he died on March 12, 1927.

Mount Cotter, located in the Kings Canyon National Park is named after Cotter. James Sutton Harrison a descendant of the Suttons who adopted Cotter and his six siblings was instrumental in having Mount Cotter named. Harrison sent a letter to Cotter's friend Mrs. Cort Sheriff in Helena asking about Cotter's character. Mrs. Sheriff wrote 'Dick was always a gentleman, clean, honest, neat, and that's saying much in those times when he had nothing to break the monotony at his cabin home.' Richard was also mentioned in an article in a Montana newspaper in 1923 about old placer miners by L.A. Osborn.
