= Mount Muir =

Mountain of the Sierra Nevada in California, United States

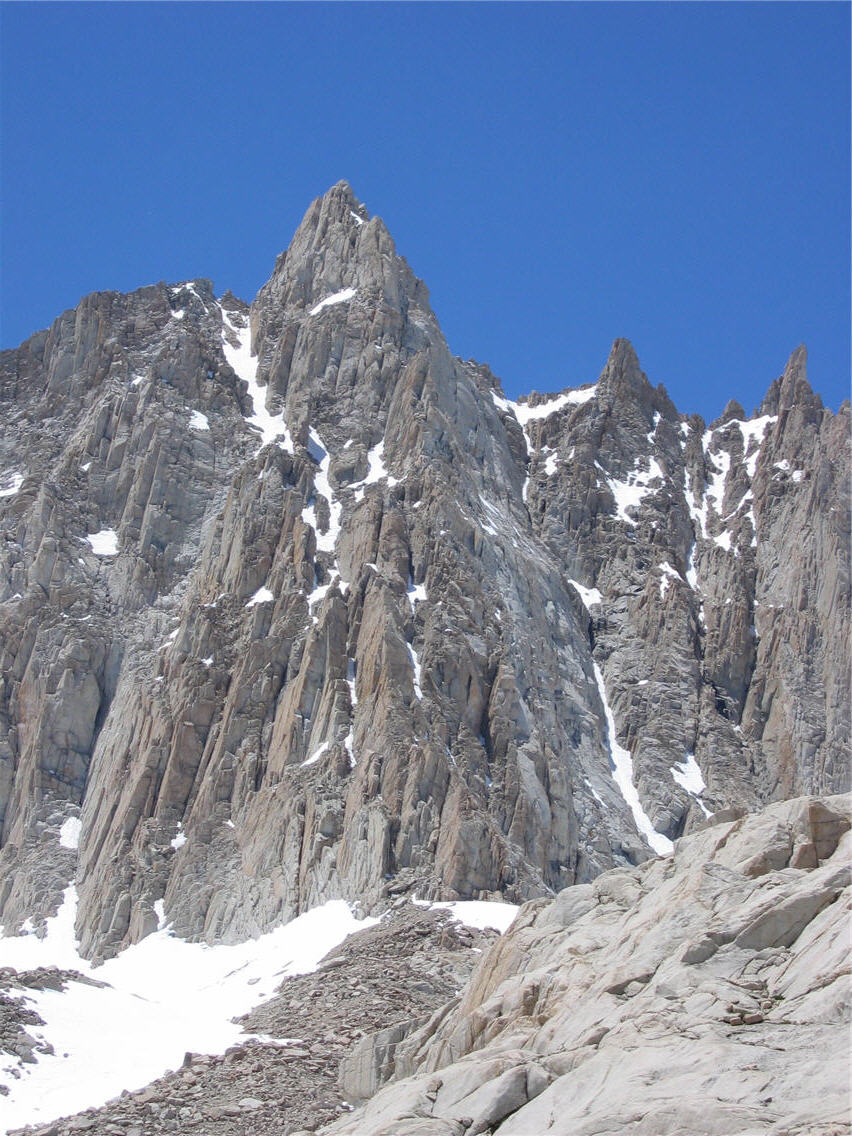
- The East Face of Mount Muir

Highest point
- Elevation: 14,018 ft (4,273 m) NAVD 88
- Prominence: 318 ft (97 m)
- Parent peak: Mount Whitney
- Listing: Sierra Peaks Section; Western States Climbers Emblem peak; Vulgarian Ramblers; Vagmarken Club Sierra Crest List
- Coordinates: 36°33′53″N 118°17′29″W

Geography
- Location within California
- Location: Inyo and Tulare counties, California, U.S.
- Parent range: Sierra Nevada
- Topo map: USGS Mount Whitney

Climbing
- First ascent: 1919 by LeRoy Jeffers
- Easiest route: Hike and scramble from the west, class 3

Mount Muir is a peak in the Sierra Nevada of California, 0.95 miles (1.5 km) south of Mount Whitney. This 14,018-foot (4,273 m) peak is named in honor of John Muir, a geologist, conservationist and founder of the Sierra Club. The southernmost section of the John Muir Trail contours along the west side of Mount Muir near its summit and ends on the summit of Mount Whitney.

== Climbing ==
Among mountain climbers, a peak needs to meet certain criteria in order to be included in some lists. To be listed as an independent peak a summit must have 300 feet (91 m) of clean prominence. A reliable source gives Mount Muir's clean prominence as 318 feet, and so the peak does qualify for lists of fourteeners based on elevation and prominence. It is included in lists such the Sierra Peaks Section list, the Western States Climbers list, and the Vulgarian Ramblers 13,800-Footers of the Contiguous USA list.

The easiest approach is from the John Muir Trail just north of its junction with the Mount Whitney Trail in Sequoia National Park. The trail passes very near the summit and the climb involves a short stretch of difficult scrambling and/or easy rock climbing up the steep western slope to the summit block, (class 3). A dayhike permit or a backcountry permit with a Whitney Zone stamp is required to hike the Mount Whitney Trail.

The east side of Mount Muir, which is in the John Muir Wilderness, is a near-vertical cliff about 1,400 feet (430 m) high. The route on this side (the north side of the east buttress) was first climbed on July 11, 1935, by Nelson P. Nies and John D. Mendenhall. It is a roped climb, (class 4). The south side of the east buttress, also class 4, was first climbed on September 1, 1935, by Arthur B. Johnson and William Rice.

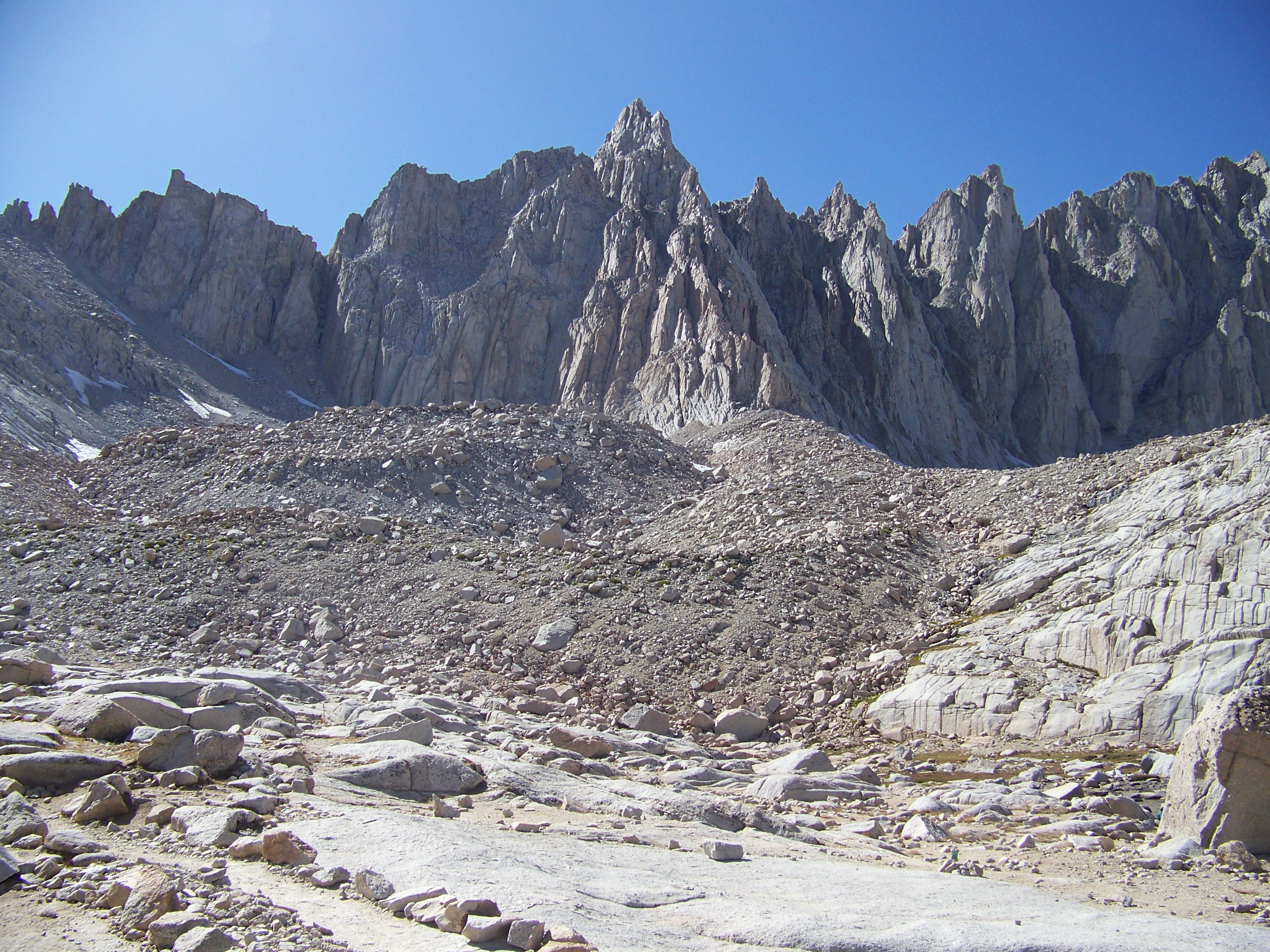
Mount Muir's East Face and the Sierra crest as seen from Trail Camp on the Mount Whitney Trail during September of a drought year.

== See also ==
- List of mountain peaks of California
