= Sierra Club =

American environmental organization

- Formation: May 28, 1892; 134 years ago
- Founder: John Muir
- Type: Social welfare organization
- Tax ID no.: 94-1153307
- Legal status: 501(c)(4) organization
- Headquarters: 2101 Webster St. Suite 1300
- Location: Oakland, California, United States
- Members: 1+ million
- Executive director: Loren Blackford
- Affiliations: Sierra Club Foundation, Sierra Student Coalition, Sierra Club Books, Sierra Club Canada
- Revenue: 83.8 million (2025)
- Expenses: 84.9 million (2025)
- Staff: 940 (2024)
- Volunteers: 10,059 (2024)
- Website: www.sierraclub.org

The Sierra Club is an American environmental organization with chapters in all 50 U.S. states, Washington D.C., and Puerto Rico.

It was founded in 1892, in San Francisco, by preservationist John Muir. A product of the progressive movement, it was one of the world's first large-scale environmental preservation organizations.

It has lobbied for policies to promote sustainable energy and mitigate global warming, as well as opposing the use of coal, hydropower, and nuclear power. Its political endorsements generally favor liberal and progressive candidates in elections.

In addition to political advocacy, the Sierra Club organizes outdoor recreation activities and has been a notable organization for mountaineering and rock climbing in the United States.

Sierra Club members pioneered the Yosemite Decimal System of climbing, and were responsible for a substantial amount of the early development of climbing. Much of this activity occurred in the group's namesake, the Sierra Nevada.

The Sierra Club operates only in the United States and holds the legal status of a 501(c)(4) nonprofit social welfare organization. Sierra Club Canada is a separate entity.

== Overview ==
The Sierra Club's stated mission is "To explore, enjoy, and protect the wild places of the earth; To practice and promote the responsible use of the earth's ecosystems and resources; To educate and enlist humanity to protect and restore the quality of the natural and human environment; and to use all lawful means to carry out these objectives."

The Sierra Club is governed by a 15-member board of directors. Each year, five directors are elected to three-year terms, and all club members are eligible to vote. A president is elected annually by the Board from among its members. The executive director runs the day-to-day operations of the group. Michael Brune, formerly of Rainforest Action Network, served as the organization's executive director from 2010. Brune succeeded Carl Pope. Pope stepped down amid discontent that the group had strayed from its core principles.

In January 2023, former NAACP president Ben Jealous became the organization's new executive director, making him the first African American to fulfill the role. Jealous's tenure was marked by significant internal strife, including repeated restructures and layoffs that sparked tension with staff, unions, and stakeholders. Allegations of unfair labor practices and union-busting were filed against both Jealous and the Sierra Club, contributing to growing discontent within the organization. In the spring of 2024, Progressive Workers Union, which represents over 50% of Sierra Club staff, conducted a vote of no confidence in Jealous's leadership.

In April 2025, Robert D. Bullard, widely regarded as the father of environmental justice, publicly requested that the Sierra Club remove his name from its Robert Bullard Environmental Justice Award, citing unmet promises and a failure to protect the predominantly Black Shiloh community. His statement intensified criticism of Jealous's leadership, after Jealous was reported to have referred to Bullard and community members as "snakes" in response to public criticism. Bullard subsequently called for a vote of no confidence in Jealous. Multiple no-confidence votes from staff, volunteers, and chapters further underscored organizational unrest. In July 2025, Jealous took a leave of absence from his role at the Sierra Club. On August 11, 2025, the Sierra Club board "unanimously voted to terminate Mr. Jealous' employment with the Sierra Club for cause following extensive evaluation of his conduct." In September 2025, Loren Blackford was named as the group's new executive director.

The Sierra Club is organized on both a national and state level with chapters named for the 50 states and two U.S. territories (Puerto Rico and Washington D.C.) California is the lone state to have numerous chapters named for California counties. The club chapters allow for regional groups and committees, some of which have many thousands of members. These chapters further allow for special interest sections (e.g. camera, outings), committees (conservation and political), and task forces on a single issue with some kind of geography involved. While much activity is coordinated at a local level, the club is a unified organization; decisions made at the national level take precedence, including the removal and creation of chapters, as well as recruiting and removing members.

The club is known for engaging in two main activities: promoting and guiding outdoor recreational activities, which is done throughout the United States but primarily in California (especially Southern California), and political activism to promote environmental causes. Described as one of the United States' "leading environmental organizations", the Sierra Club makes endorsements of individual candidates for elected office.

== History ==
Petition and map from John Muir and other founders of Sierra Club

=== Founding ===
Journalist Robert Underwood Johnson had worked with John Muir on the successful campaign to create a large Yosemite National Park surrounding the much smaller state park which had been created in 1864. This campaign succeeded in 1890. As early as 1889, Johnson had encouraged Muir to form an "association" to help protect the Sierra Nevada, and preliminary meetings were held to plan the group. Others involved in the early planning included artist William Keith, Willis Linn Jepson, Warren Olney, Willard Drake Johnson, Joseph LeConte and David Starr Jordan.

In May 1892, the young botany professor, Willis Linn Jepson from the University of California, Berkeley, helped Muir and attorney Warren Olney launch the new organization modeled after the eastern Appalachian Mountain Club. The charter members of the Sierra Club elected Muir president, an office he held until his death in 1914. The early Sierra Club favored the needs of white members to the exclusion of people of color, and Muir and some of his associates, such as Joseph LeConte, David Starr Jordan, and Henry Fairfield Osborn were closely related to the early eugenics movement in the United States.

The first goals of the club included establishing Glacier and Mount Rainier national parks, convincing the California legislature to give Yosemite Valley to the U.S. federal government, and preserving coastal redwood forests of California.

Muir escorted President Theodore Roosevelt through Yosemite in 1903, and two years later the California legislature ceded Yosemite Valley and Mariposa Grove to the federal government. The Sierra Club won its first lobbying victory with the creation of the country's second national park, after Yellowstone in 1872.

=== Environmental action over the Hetch Hetchy Reservoir ===
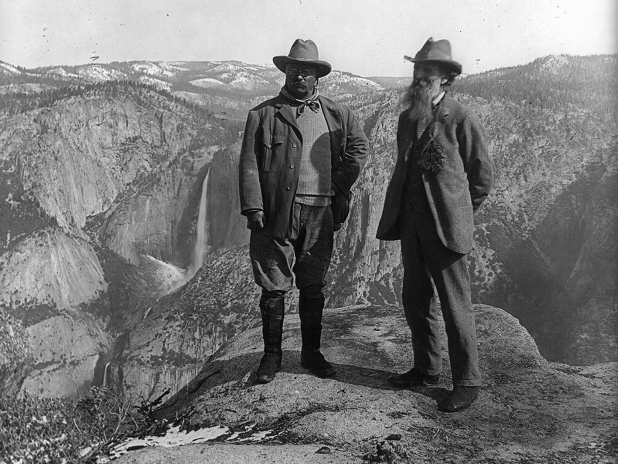
Theodore Roosevelt and John Muir in Yosemite National Park, c. 1906

In the first decade of the 1900s, the Sierra Club became embroiled in the Hetch Hetchy Reservoir battle that divided preservationists from "resource management" conservationists. In the late 19th century, the city of San Francisco was rapidly outgrowing its limited water supply, which depended on intermittent local springs and streams. In 1890, San Francisco mayor James D. Phelan proposed to build a dam and aqueduct on the Tuolumne River, one of the largest southern Sierra rivers, as a way to increase and stabilize the city's water supply.

Gifford Pinchot, a progressive supporter of public utilities and head of the US Forest Service, which then had jurisdiction over the national parks, supported the creation of the Hetch Hetchy dam. Muir appealed to his friend U.S. President Roosevelt, who would not commit himself against the dam, given its popularity with the people of San Francisco (a referendum in 1908 confirmed a seven-to-one majority in favor of the dam and municipal water). Muir and attorney William Edward Colby began a national campaign against the dam, attracting the support of many eastern conservationists. With the 1912 election of U.S. President Woodrow Wilson, who carried San Francisco, supporters of the dam had a friend in the White House.

The bill to dam Hetch Hetchy passed Congress in 1913, and so the Sierra Club lost its first major battle. In retaliation, the club supported creation of the National Park Service in 1916, to remove the parks from Forest Service oversight. Stephen Mather, a Club member from Chicago and an opponent of the Hetch Hetchy dam, became the first National Park Service director.

=== 1920s–1940s ===
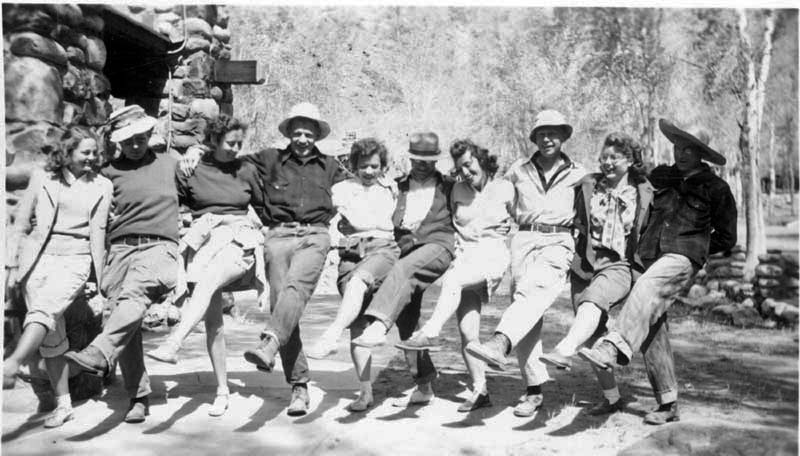
Sierra Club members practicing a comedy skit for later social entertainment, c. 1948

During the 1920s and 1930s, the Sierra Club functioned as a social and recreational society, conducting outings, maintaining trails and building huts and lodges in the Sierra. Preservation campaigns included a several-year effort to enlarge Sequoia National Park (achieved in 1926) and over three decades of work to protect and then preserve Kings Canyon National Park (established in 1940). Historian Stephen Fox notes, "In the 1930s most of the three thousand members were middle-aged Republicans."

The New Deal brought many conservationists to the Democratic Party, and many Democrats entered the ranks of conservationists. Leading the generation who revitalized the Sierra Club after World War II were attorneys Richard Leonard and Bestor Robinson, nature photographer Ansel Adams, and David Brower.

Adams sponsored Brower for membership in the club, and he was appointed to the editorial board of the Sierra Club Bulletin. After World War II Brower returned to his job with the University of California Press, and began editing the Sierra Club Bulletin in 1946.

=== National reach ===
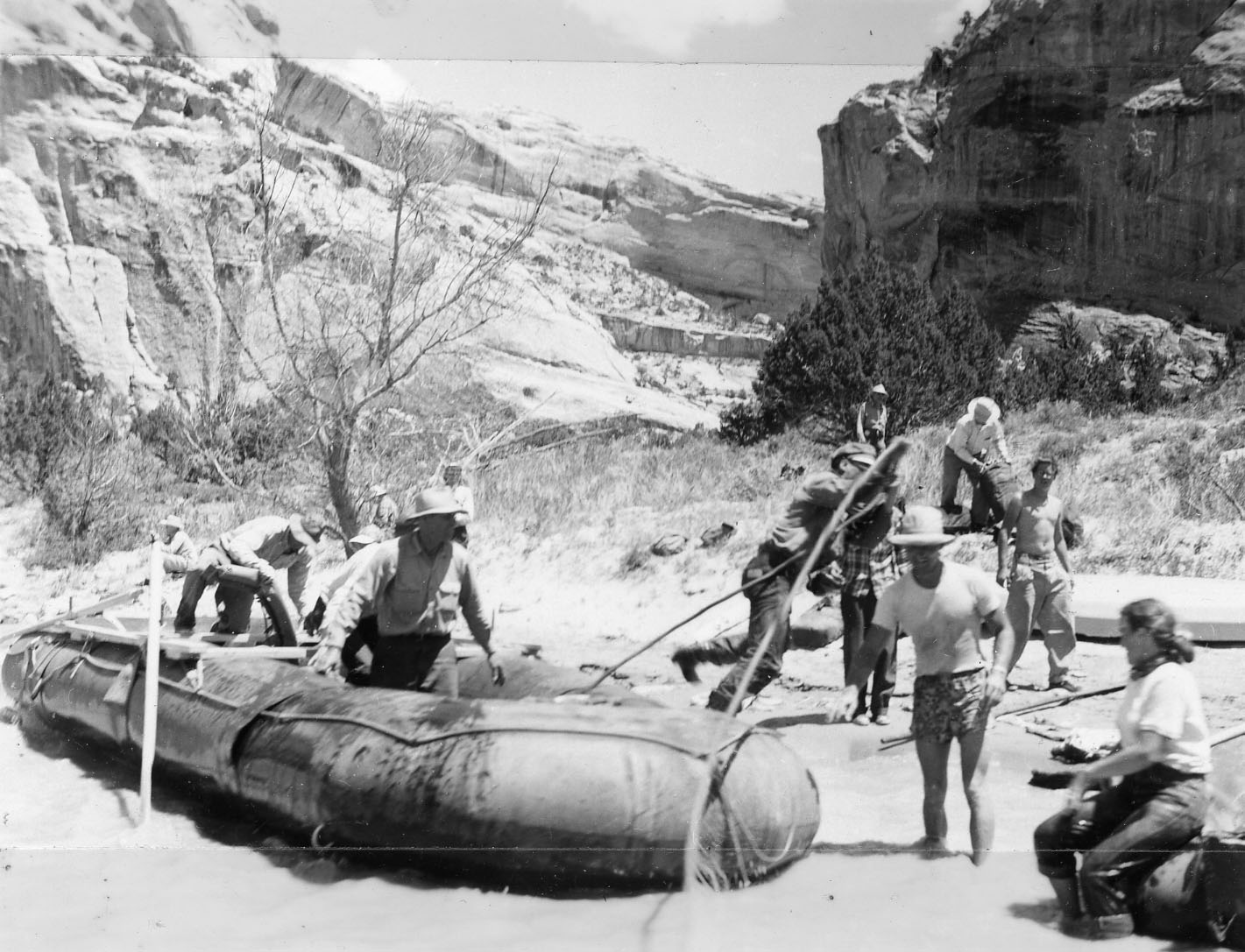
Green River canyon trip at Dinosaur National Monument's Bull Park in 1953.

In 1950, the Sierra Club had some 7,000 members, mostly on the West Coast. That year the Atlantic chapter became the first formed outside California. An active volunteer board of directors ran the organization, assisted by a small clerical staff. Brower was appointed the first executive director in 1952, and the club began to catch up with major conservation organizations such as the National Audubon Society, National Wildlife Federation, The Wilderness Society, and Izaak Walton League, which had long had professional staff.

The Sierra Club secured its national reputation in the battle against the Echo Park Dam in Dinosaur National Monument in Utah, which had been announced by the Bureau of Reclamation in 1950. Brower led the fight, marshaling support from other conservation groups. Brower's background in publishing proved decisive; with the help of publisher Alfred Knopf, This Is Dinosaur was rushed into press. Invoking the specter of Hetch Hetchy, conservationists effectively lobbied Congress, which deleted the Echo Park dam from the Colorado River project as approved in 1955. Recognition of the Sierra Club's role in the Echo Park dam victory boosted membership from 10,000 in 1956 to 15,000 in 1960.

The Sierra Club was now truly a national conservation organization, and preservationists took the offensive with wilderness proposals. The club's Biennial Wilderness Conferences, launched in 1949 in concert with The Wilderness Society, became an important force in the campaign that secured passage of the Wilderness Act in 1964, marking the first time that public lands (9.1 million acres) were permanently protected from development. Grand Teton National Park and Olympic National Park were also enlarged at the Sierra Club's urging.

=== Book series ===
In 1960, Brower launched the Exhibit Format book series with This Is the American Earth, and in 1962, In Wildness Is the Preservation of the World, with color photographs by Eliot Porter. These coffee-table books, published by their Sierra Club Books division, introduced the Sierra Club to a wider audience. Fifty thousand copies were sold in the first four years, and by 1960 sales exceeded $10 million. Soon Brower was publishing two new titles a year in the Exhibit Format series, but not all did as well as In Wildness. Although the books were successful in introducing the public to wilderness preservation and the Sierra Club, they lost money for the organization, some $60,000 a year after 1964. Financial management became a matter of contention between Brower and his board of directors.

=== Grand Canyon campaign ===
The Sierra Club's most publicized crusade of the 1960s was the effort to stop the Bureau of Reclamation from building two dams that would flood portions of the Grand Canyon. The book Time and the River Flowing: Grand Canyon authored by Francois Leydet was published in the Exhibit Format book series. Opposing the Bridge Canyon and Marble Canyon dam projects, full-page ads the club placed in The New York Times and The Washington Post in 1966 exclaimed, "This time it's the Grand Canyon they want to flood," and asked, "Should we also flood the Sistine Chapel so tourists can get nearer the ceiling?" The ads generated a storm of protest to the Congress, prompting the Internal Revenue Service to announce it was suspending the Sierra Club's 501(c)(3) status pending an investigation. The board had taken the precaution of setting up the Sierra Club Foundation as a (c)(3) organization in 1960 for endowments and contributions for educational and other non-lobbying activities. Even so, contributions to the club dropped off, aggravating its annual operating deficits. Membership, however, climbed sharply in response to the investigation into the legitimacy of the society's tax status by the IRS from 30,000 in 1965 to 57,000 in 1967 and 75,000 in 1969.

The victory over the dam projects and challenges from the IRS did not come without costs. To make up for the power that would have been produced by the dams, the Sierra Club actually advocated for coal power plants. The result of the campaign and its trade-off was, in the words of historian Andrew Needham, that "the Grand Canyon became protected, sacred space," while "the Navajo Reservation"—which housed some of the main power plants picking up the slack—"became increasingly industrial."

=== End of the Brower era ===
Despite the club's success in blocking plans for the Grand Canyon dams and weathering the transition from 501(c)(3) to 501(c)(4) status, tension grew over finances between Brower and the board of directors. The club's annual deficits rose from $100,000 in 1967 and 1968 to some $200,000 in 1969. Another conflict occurred over the club's policy toward the nuclear power plant to be constructed by Pacific Gas and Electric (PG&E) at Diablo Canyon near San Luis Obispo, California. Although the club had played the leading role blocking PG&E's nuclear power plant proposed for Bodega Bay, California, in the early 1960s, that case had been built around the local environmental impact and earthquake danger from the nearby San Andreas Fault, not from opposition to nuclear power itself. In exchange for moving the new proposed site from the environmentally sensitive Nipomo Dunes to Diablo Canyon, the board of directors voted to support PG&E's plan for the power plant. A membership referendum in 1967 upheld the board's decision.

But Brower concluded that nuclear power at any location was a mistake, and he voiced his opposition to the plant, contrary to the club's official policy. As pro- and anti-Brower factions polarized, the annual election of new directors reflected the conflict. Brower's supporters won a majority in 1968, but in the April 1969 election the anti-Brower candidates won all five open positions. Ansel Adams and president Richard Leonard, two of his closest friends on the board, led the opposition to Brower, charging him with financial recklessness and insubordination and calling for his ouster as executive director. The board voted ten to five to accept Brower's resignation. Eventually reconciled with the club, Brower was elected to the board of directors for a term from 1983 to 1988, and again from 1995 to 2000. Brower resigned from the board in 2000.

=== McCloskey years ===
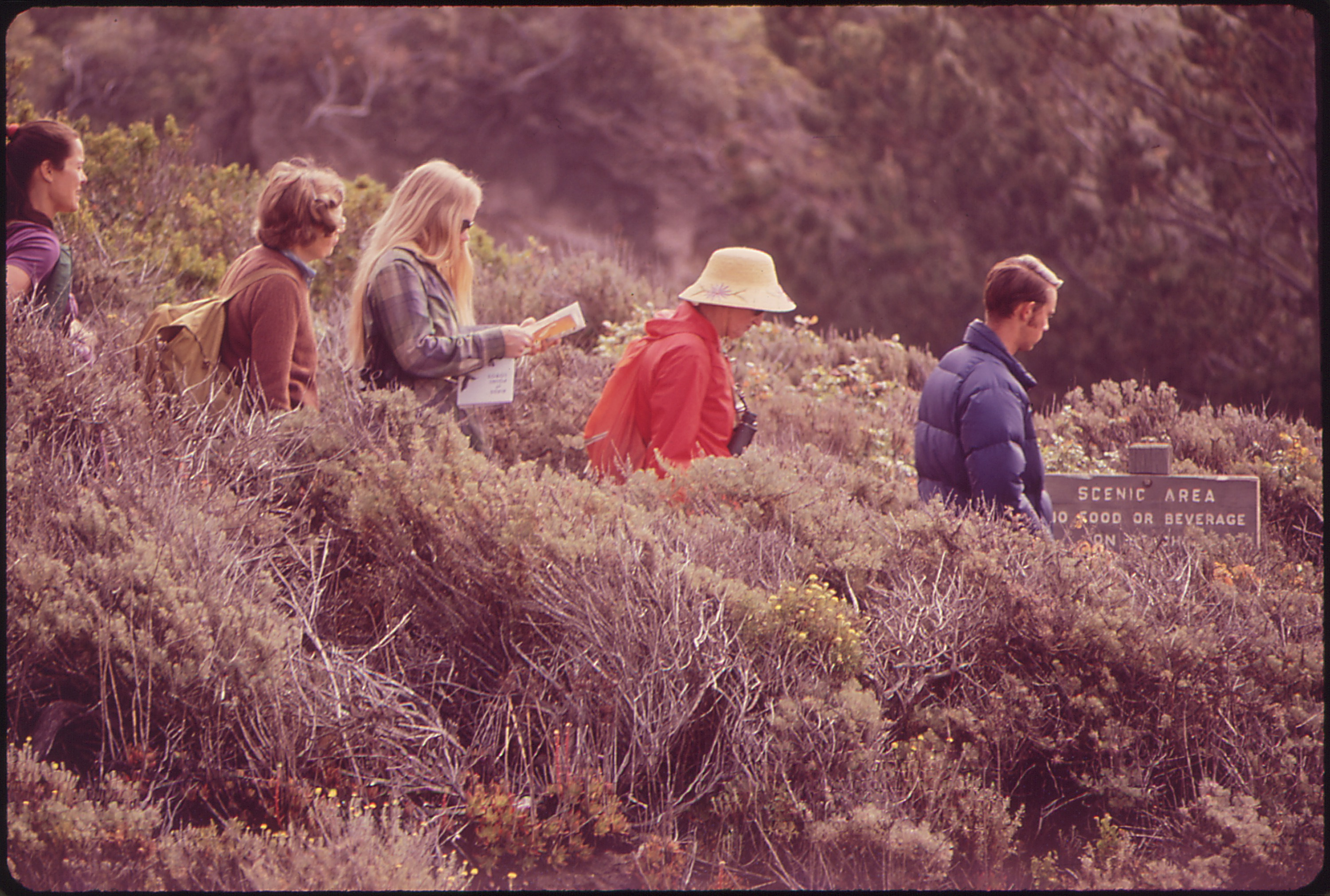
Nature hike at Point Lobos State Reserve in 1972.

Michael McCloskey, hired by Brower in 1961 as the club's first northwest field representative, became the club's second executive director in 1969. An administrator attentive to detail, McCloskey had set up the club's conservation department in 1965 and guided the campaigns to save the Grand Canyon and establish Redwoods National Park and North Cascades National Park. During the 1970s, McCloskey led the club's legislative activity—preserving Alaskan lands and eastern wilderness areas, and supporting the new environmental agenda: the Toxic Substances Control Act of 1976, the Clean Air Act amendments, and the Surface Mining Control and Reclamation Act of 1977, passed during the administration of President Jimmy Carter. Efforts of the Sierra Club and others—including Black community organizers who fought against destructive "urban renewal" projects—led to passage of the National Environmental Policy Act and the Water Pollution Control Act.

The Sierra Club formed a political committee and made its first presidential endorsement in 1984 in support of Walter Mondale's unsuccessful campaign to unseat Ronald Reagan. McCloskey resigned as executive director in 1985 after 16 1/2 years (the same length of time Brower had led the organization), and assumed the title of chairman, becoming the club's senior strategist, devoting his time to conservation policy rather than budget planning and administration. After a two-year interlude with Douglas Wheeler, whose Republican credentials were disconcerting to liberal members, the club hired Michael Fischer, the former head of the California Coastal Commission, who served as executive director from 1987 to 1992. Carl Pope, formerly the club's legislative director, was named executive director in 1992.

=== Lobbying within the club ===
In the 1990s, club members Jim Bensman, Roger Clarke, David Dilworth, Chad Hanson and David Orr along with about 2,000 members formed the John Muir Sierrans (JMS), an internal caucus, to promote changes to club positions. They favored a zero-cut forest policy on public lands and, a few years later, decommissioning Glen Canyon Dam. JMS was successful in changing club positions on both counts.

=== 21st century ===
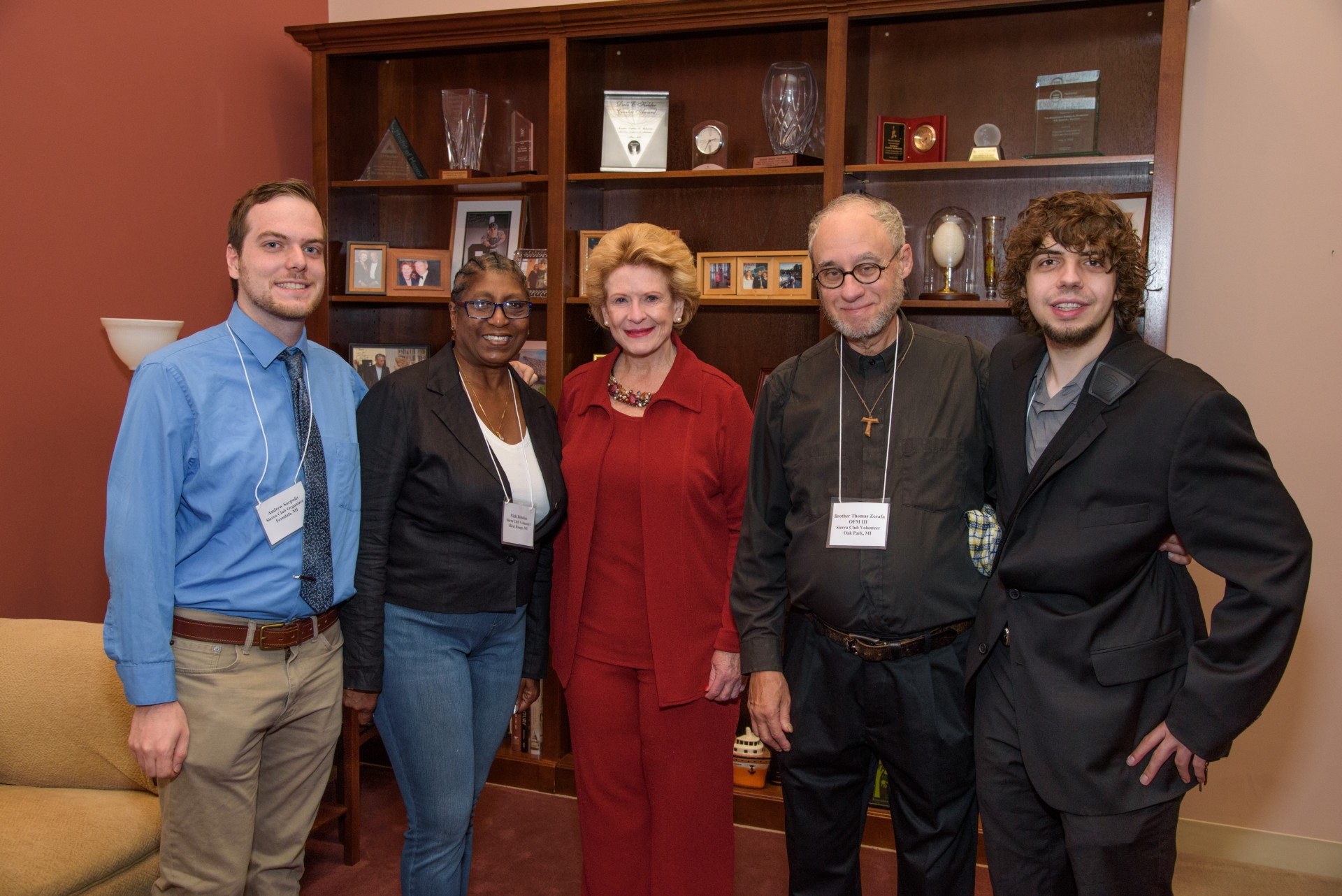
Senator Stabenow meets with representatives of the Sierra Club in 2017.

In 2008, several Sierra Club officers quit in protest after the Sierra Club agreed to promote products by Clorox, which had been named one of a "dangerous dozen" chemical companies by the Public Interest Research Group in 2004. According to Carl Pope, the Sierra Club chairman, the deal brought the club $1.3 million over the four-year term of the contract. In November 2011, Pope stepped down amid discontent about the deal and other issues. Between 2007 and 2010, the Sierra Club accepted over $25 million in donations from the gas industry, mostly from Aubrey McClendon, CEO of Chesapeake Energy, a large gas drilling company involved in fracking.

In January 2013, executive director Michael Brune announced that the Sierra Club would officially participate in the first civil disobedience action in its 120-year history as part of the ongoing protest calling on the Obama administration to reject the Keystone XL tar sands pipeline, stating, "We are watching a global crisis unfold before our eyes, and to stand aside and let it happen—even though we know how to stop it—would be unconscionable." On February 13, 2013, Brune was arrested along with 48 people, including civil rights leader Julian Bond and NASA climate scientist James Hansen. In May 2015, the Sierra Club appointed its first Black president of the board of directors, Aaron Mair. The Sierra Club endorsed Hillary Clinton in the 2016 U.S. presidential election, and Joe Biden in the 2020 U.S. presidential election, citing its opposition to Donald Trump's environmental deregulation.

In 2020, in wake of the George Floyd protests and subsequent public reconciliation of systematic racism in public history, the Sierra Club described their own early history intermingled with racism. In particular, the early Sierra Club favored the needs of white members to the exclusion of people of color, and Muir and some of his associates, such as Joseph LeConte, David Starr Jordan, and Henry Fairfield Osborn were closely related to the early eugenics movement in the United States. Michael Brune, writing as the executive director of the Sierra Club, disavowed founder John Muir in the summer of 2020, but some board members said Brune's characterization of Muir was not representative of the organization.

In January 2023, former NAACP president Ben Jealous became the organization's new executive director, making him the first African American to fill the role. In 2024, Sierra Club listed nuclear power as one of the sources included in Clean Energy Standard (CES). After Jealous' 2025 firing, civil rights leader Al Sharpton condemned the firing for its "serious racial implications". In August 2025, Bloomberg revealed that Jealous faced a sexual harassment and bullying complaint.

== Outdoor programs ==
=== Mountaineering ===
In 1901, William Colby organized the first Sierra Club excursion to Yosemite Valley. The annual High Trips were led by mountaineers such as Francis P. Farquhar, Joseph Nisbet LeConte, Norman Clyde, Walter A. Starr, Jr., Jules Eichorn, Glen Dawson, Ansel Adams, and David R. Brower. A number of first ascents in the Sierra Nevada were made on Sierra Club outings. Sierra Club members were also early enthusiasts of rock climbing. In 1911, the first chapter was formed, Angeles, and it began conducting local excursions in the mountains surrounding Los Angeles and throughout the West. Steve Roper's Fifty Classic Climbs of North America, sponsored and published by the Sierra Club, is still considered one of the definitive rock climbing guidebooks in the United States. The Wilderness Travel Course is a basic mountaineering class that is administered by the Sierra Club.

=== Hiking and outings ===
In World War II, a number of Sierra Club leaders joined the 10th Mountain Division. Among them was David R. Brower, who managed the High Trip program from 1947 to 1954, while serving as a major in the Army Reserve.

In many areas of the country, Sierra Club also organizes hiking tours. Sierra Club's website has a "hiking near me" function. Section "Sierra Club Near You" shows all the upcoming trips in nearby area.

The historic High Trips, sometimes large expeditions with more than a hundred participants and crew, have given way to smaller and more numerous excursions held across the United States and abroad. These outings form a major part of Sierra Club culture, and in some chapters, constitute the majority of member activity. Other chapters, however, may sponsor very few outdoor or recreational activities, being focused solely on political advocacy. Generally, chapters in California are much more active with regard to outdoor activities.

=== Sierra Club awards ===
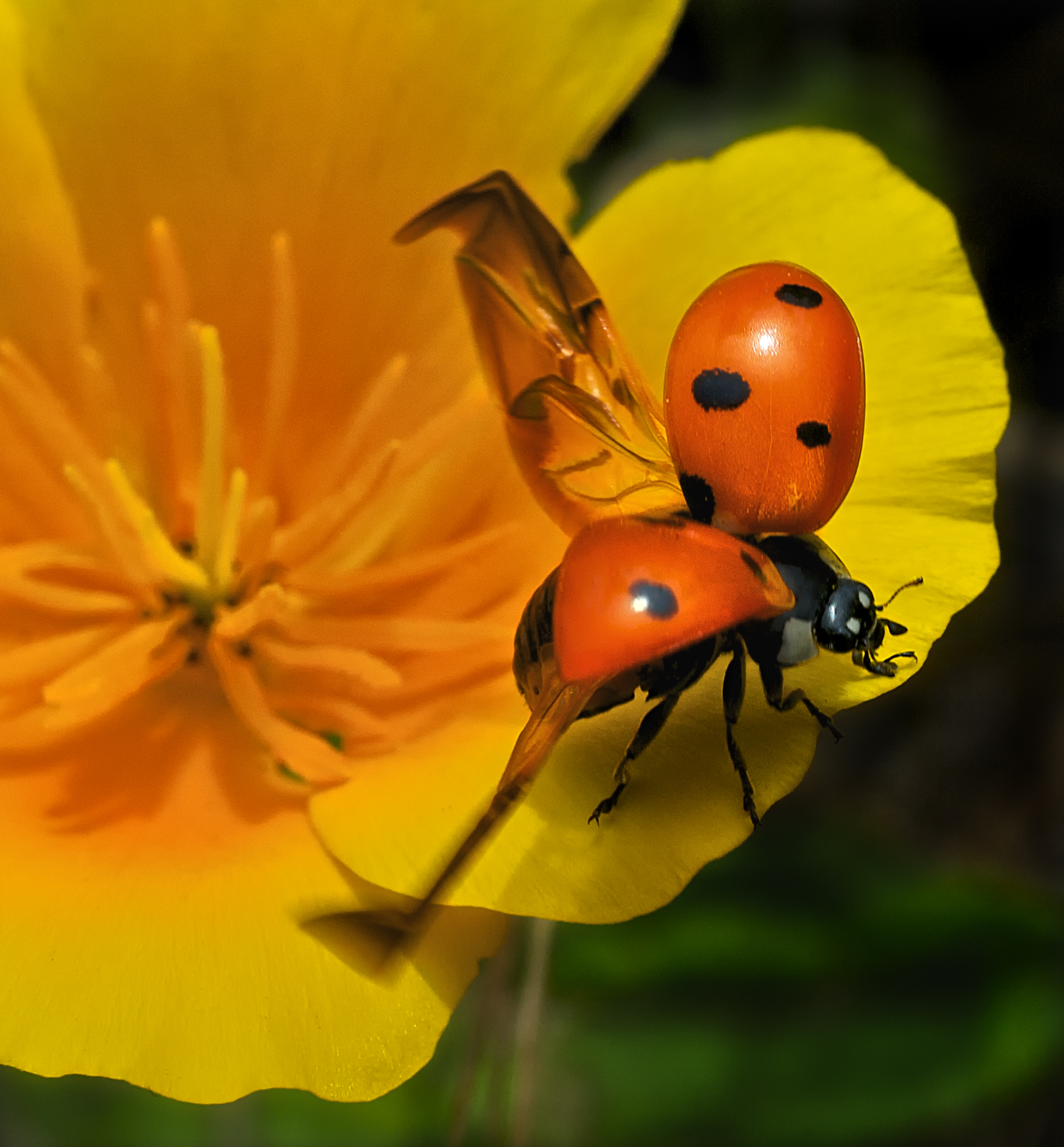
Ladybug, Ready for Takeoff – Grand Prize Winner in the Sierra Club's April 2010 Trails Photo Contest

The Sierra Club presents a number of annual awards, such as the Sierra Club John Muir Award, the Ansel Adams Award for Conservation Photography, the Francis P. Farquhar Mountaineering Award, the Edgar Wayburn Award for public officials, the Rachel Carson Award for journalists and writers, the William O. Douglas Award for legal work, and the EarthCare Award for international environmental protection and conservation.

== Policy positions ==
=== Land management ===
Land management, access, and conservation are traditionally considered the core advocacy areas of the Sierra Club. Uniquely for a progressive organization, the Sierra Club has strong grassroots organization in rural areas, with much activity focused on ensuring equitable and environmentally-friendly use of public lands. This is particularly accentuated by the fact that the club attracts many people who primarily join the club for recreation and use of public land for hiking.

In 2023, the Sierra Club sued the Puerto Rican government for 18 renewable energy projects on more than 2,000 hectares of land. The Sierra Club argued that the land was ecologically sensitive and of high agricultural value. The Sierra Club said that building renewable energy projects on agricultural land was a "serious attack on the food security of Puerto Rico."

=== Opposition to coal ===
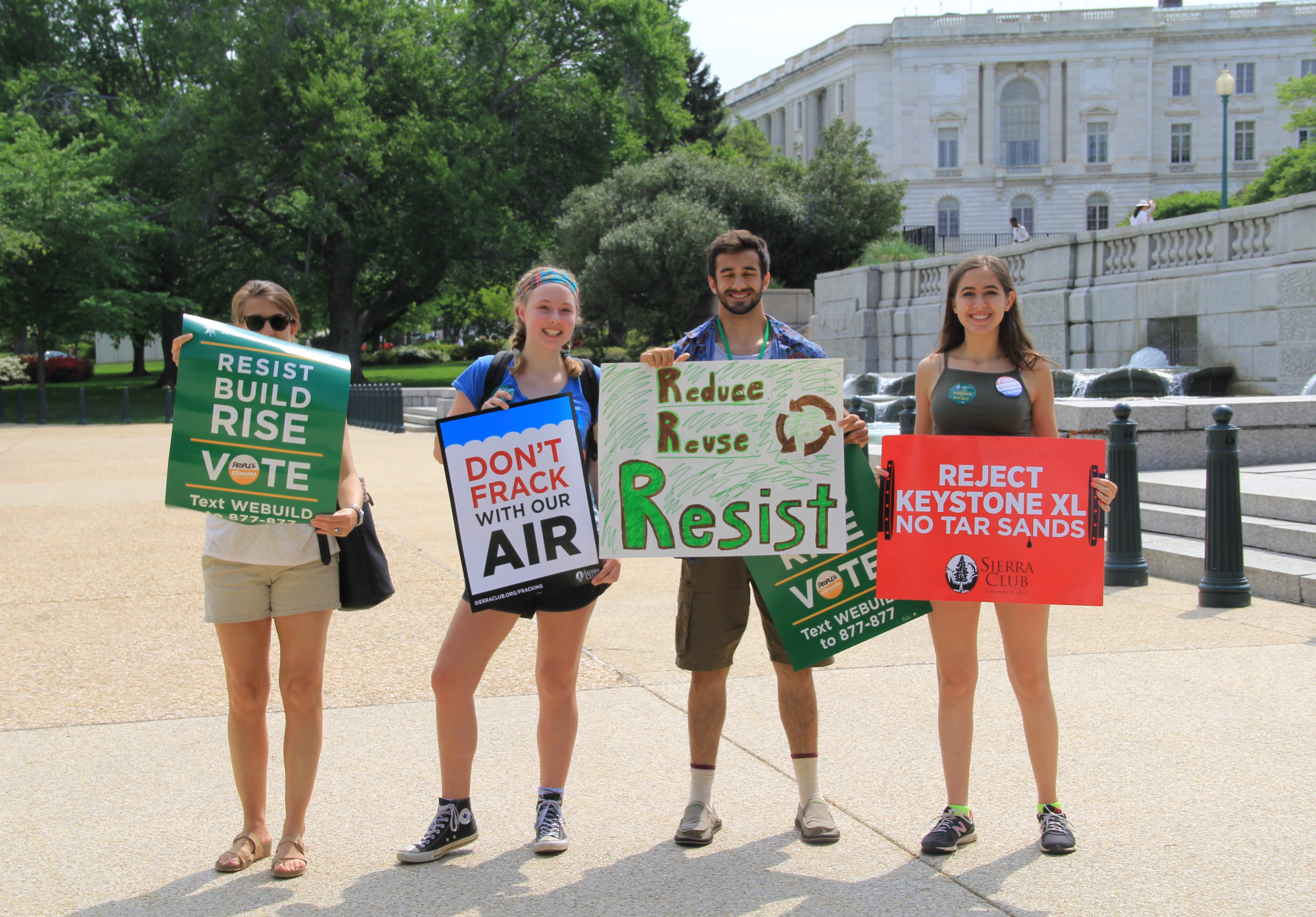
Sierra Club at People's Climate March in Washington DC in 2017.

A goal of the Sierra Club is to replace coal with other energy sources. Through its "Beyond Coal" campaign, the Sierra Club set a goal to close half of all coal plants in the U.S. by 2017. American business magnate and former New York City mayor Michael Bloomberg donated $50 million to the Sierra Club's anti-coal work in 2011, and announced another $30 million gift to Sierra's Beyond Coal campaign in 2015. The Beyond Coal campaign says 187 coal plants have been closed since 2010. Other funders of the Sierra Club's anti-coal campaign include the William and Flora Hewlett Foundation and the John D. and Catherine T. MacArthur Foundation. The CEO of Chesapeake Energy, a natural gas company, donated $26 million to the Beyond Coal campaign between 2007 and 2010.

=== Lawsuits against renewable energy projects ===
The Sierra Club sued the Puerto Rico government in 2023 for its plans to build dozens of renewable energy projects. The organization said the projects were planned to be built on lands that were ecologically sensitive and of high agricultural value. At the time, Puerto Rico was overwhelmingly dependent on fossil fuels for its energy use, while only 2% of its energy came from renewable sources.

=== Opposition to nuclear power ===
The Sierra Club is "unequivocally opposed" to nuclear power.

=== Opposition to hydropower and dams ===
The Sierra Club has lobbied against hydropower projects and large-scale dams. In lobbying against hydropower projects, the Sierra Club has expressed opposition to power lines and said that hydropower projects disrupt animal habitats.

The Sierra Club opposes dams it considers inappropriate, including some government-built dams in national parks. In the early 20th century, the organization fought against the damming and flooding of the Hetch Hetchy Valley in Yosemite National Park. Despite this lobbying, Congress authorized the construction of O'Shaughnessy Dam on the Tuolumne River. The Sierra Club continues to support removal of the dam.

The Sierra Club advocates the decommissioning of Glen Canyon Dam and the draining of Lake Powell. The club also supports removal, breaching or decommissioning of many other dams, including four dams on the lower Snake River in eastern Washington. The Sierra Club opposes the importation of energy from Quebec's hydropower plants to New York, arguing that importing excess energy by the Quebec plants will cause environmental damage and lead to fewer in-state New York renewable energy projects.

=== Mixed views on solar projects ===
Some chapters of the Sierra Club have lobbied against solar power projects, whereas others have defended them. The Sierra Club opposed the Battle Born Solar Project, the largest solar project in the U.S., citing its potential impact on desert tortoise habitats. The Sierra Club sued the federal government to stop the 663.5-megawatt Calico solar station in the Mojave Desert in California, saying it would imperil protected wildlife.

=== Opposition to streamlined permitting ===
In response to proposed reforms to streamline the permitting process for environmental projects amid concerns that environmental permitting reviews were delaying and blocking projects with a beneficial environmental impact, the Sierra Club expressed opposition to such reforms, arguing "Whatever the proposed project is — whether it's a pipeline or a highway or a solar farm — it should be subject to the same commonsense review process. If we want these projects to move forward faster, we shouldn't be weakening environmental laws, but investing more resources into the agencies and staff."

=== Lawsuits against housing ===
The Sierra Club has a history of filing lawsuits against new housing developments and trying to block legislative proposals to ease housing construction. Critics have characterized the Sierra Club's actions on housing as NIMBYism.

In 2012, the Sierra Club sued to block the construction of a mixed-use development composed of 16,655 housing units (for an estimated 37,000 residents) and commercial space in Riverside, California. In 2018, the organization opposed SB 827, which would have permitted dense housing near major public transit stations in California. Most other environmental groups supported the legislation, as dense housing construction near public transit was estimated to substantially reduce car pollution and help California reach its emissions target. Ethan Elkind, director of the Climate Change and Business Program at UC-Berkeley and UCLA Schools of Law, called it "one of the most important climate bills in California." The Sierra Club argued the bill sought to take away the sacrosanct right of localities "to make smart local decisions about development." In 2023, the Sierra Club lobbied against AB 1633, which prevents NIMBY abuse of the California Environmental Quality Act to block new housing developments that already comply with local and state land use and environmental regulations.

In 2023, the Sierra Club sued the state of Hawaii after Hawaii Governor Josh Green issued an emergency declaration to streamline housing construction in order to alleviate the Hawaii housing shortage. The Executive Director of the Sierra Club of Hawaii said that lack of housing supply was not the cause of the housing shortage in Hawaii, but rather the "decades of profiteering off of our lands and waters" by developers.

=== Alliance with organized labor ===
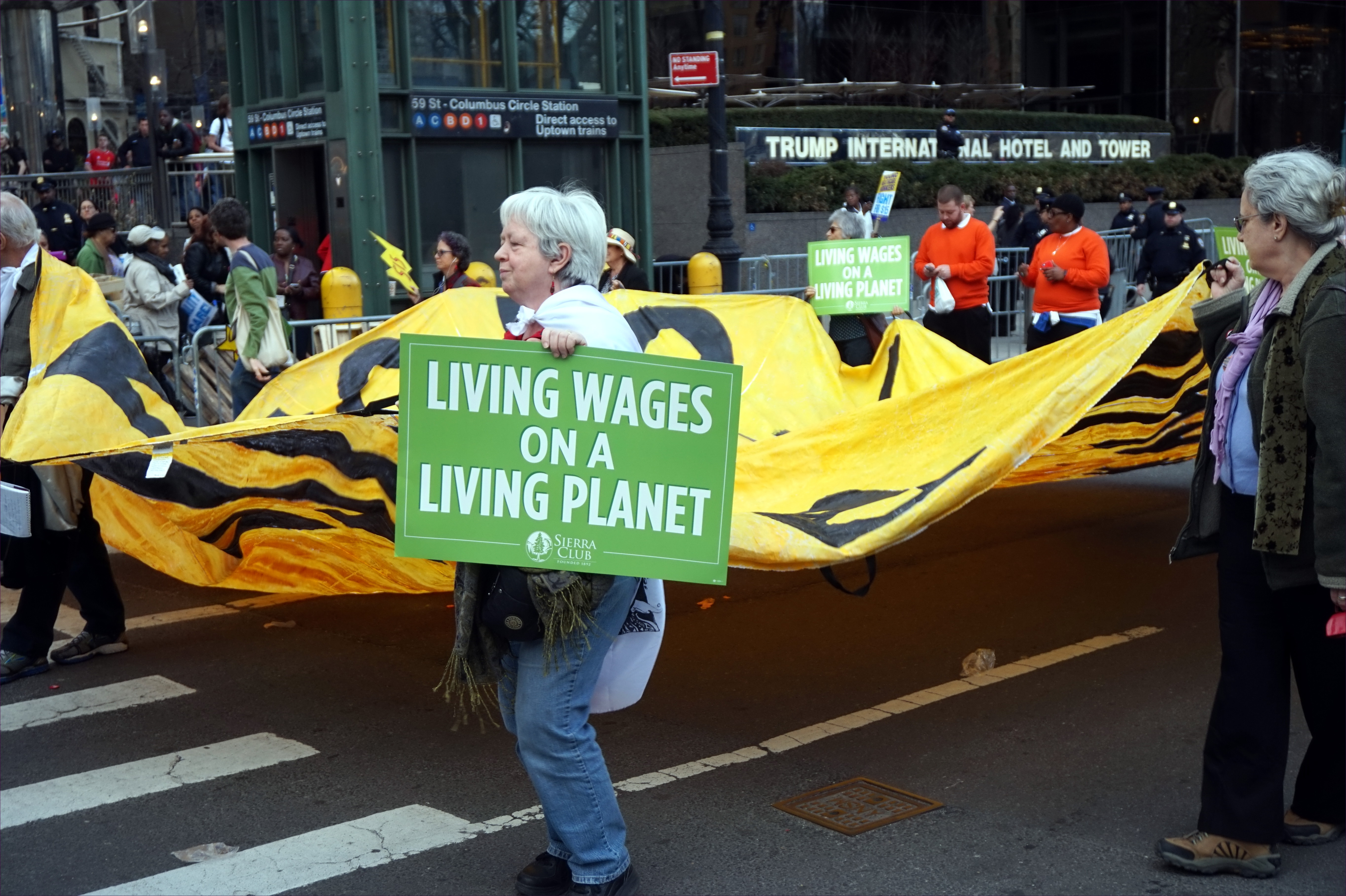
Members at the New York City Fight for $15 event in 2015.

The Sierra Club is a member of the BlueGreen Alliance, a coalition of environmental groups and labor unions. The BlueGreen Alliance was formed in 2006 and grew out of a less-formal collaboration between the Sierra Club and the United Steelworkers. In 2012, the Laborers' International Union of North America left the coalition due to the Sierra Club and other environmental groups' opposition to the Keystone Pipeline.

=== Population and immigration ===
Immigration was historically among the most divisive issues within the club. In 1996, after years of debate, the Sierra Club adopted a neutral position on immigration levels. As the club has shifted to the left over the years, this position was amended in 2013 to support "an equitable path to citizenship for undocumented immigrants".

Although the position of the Sierra Club has generally been favorable towards immigration, some critics of the Sierra Club have charged that the efforts of some club members to restrain immigration, are a continuation of aspects of human population control and the eugenics movement. In 1969, the Sierra Club published Paul R. Ehrlich's book, The Population Bomb, in which he said that population growth was responsible for environmental decline and advocated coercive measures to reduce it. Some observers have argued that the book had a "racial dimension" in the tradition of the Eugenics movement, and that it "reiterated many of Osborn's jeremiads."

During the 1980s, some Sierra Club members, including Paul Ehrlich's wife Anne, wanted to take the club into the contentious field of immigration to the United States. The club's position was that overpopulation was a significant factor in the degradation of the environment. Accordingly, the club supported stabilizing and reducing U.S. and world population. Some members argued that, as a practical matter, U.S. population could not be stabilized, let alone reduced, at the then-current levels of immigration. They urged the club to support immigration reduction. The club had previously addressed the issue of "mass immigration", and in 1988, the organization's Population Committee and Conservation Coordinating Committee stated that immigration to the U.S. should be limited, so as to achieve population stabilization.

Other Sierra Club members thought that the immigration issue was too far from the club's core environmentalist mission, and were also concerned that involvement would impair the organization's political ability to pursue its other objectives. In the mid 1990s, the club began gradually stepping away from the immigration restrictionist position, culminating with the board adopting a neutral position on immigration policy in 1996. In 1998, 60.1% of Sierra Club voting members voted that the organization should remain neutral on America's immigration policies, while 39.2% supported a measure calling for stricter curbs on immigration to the United States.

After the 1996 board policy adoption, some members who were advocates of immigration reduction organized themselves as "SUSPS", a name originally derived from "Sierrans for U.S. Population Stabilization", which now stands for "Support U.S. Population Stabilization". SUSPS advocates a return to the Sierra Club's "traditional" (1970–1996) immigration policy stance. SUSPS has called for fully closing the borders of the United States, and for returning to immigration levels established by the Immigration Act of 1924, which includes strict ethnic quotas. David Brower also cited the club's position shift on immigration as one of the reasons for his resignation from the board in 2000. Supporters of immigration reduction within the club also charged that the board had abandoned the restrictionist position on immigration due to donations from investor David Gelbaum, who reportedly gave $200 million to the club between the mid 1990s and early 2000s and threatened Carl Pope in the mid 1990s to cease donations if they did not change their position on immigration adopted in 1988.

The controversy resurfaced when a group of three immigration reduction proponents ran in the 2004 Sierra Club Board of Directors election, hoping to move the club's position away from a neutral stance on immigration, and to restore the stance previously held. Groups outside of the club became involved, such as the Southern Poverty Law Center and MoveOn. Of the three candidates, two (Frank Morris and David Pimentel), were on the board of the anti-immigration group Diversity Alliance for a Sustainable America and two (Richard Lamm and Frank Morris) were on the board of directors or the board of advisors of the Federation for American Immigration Reform; both had also held leadership positions within the NAACP. Their candidacies were denounced by a fourth candidate, Morris Dees of the SPLC, as a "hostile takeover" attempt by "radical anti-immigrant activists". The immigration reduction proponents won 7% of all votes cast in the election. In 2005, members voted 102,455 to 19,898 against a proposed change to "recognize the need to adopt lower limits on migration to the United States."

With the increased number of progressive activists joining the club in recent years, the Sierra Club has dramatically shifted its stance on immigration further towards the affirmative. Today, the Sierra Club supports a path to citizenship for undocumented immigrants, opposes a border wall and works with immigrant groups to promote environmental justice.

The Sierra Club has been criticized by anti-immigration groups such as the Center for Immigration Studies and the Federation for American Immigration Reform for opposing Trump's plan of creating a wall on the United States' southern border. These groups claim that the Sierra Club has criticized the plan for purely partisan reasons and not actually due to any environmental concerns.

== Affiliates and subsidiaries ==
The Sierra Club Foundation was founded in 1960 by David R. Brower. A 501(c)(3) organization, it was founded after the Internal Revenue Service revoked the Sierra Club's tax-exempt status due to the group's political activities. The Sierra Club added its first Canadian chapter in 1963 and in 1989 opened a national office in Ottawa. Canadian affiliates of the Sierra Club operate under the Sierra Club Canada.

In 1971, volunteer lawyers who had worked with the Sierra Club established the Sierra Club Legal Defense Fund. This was a separate organization that used the "Sierra Club" name under license from the club; it changed its name to Earthjustice in 1997. The Sierra Student Coalition (SSC) was the student-run arm of the Sierra Club. Founded by Adam Werbach in 1991, it had 30,000 members. The Summer Program (SPROG) was a one-week leadership training program that teaches tools for environmental and social justice activism to young people across the country. The organization maintained a publishing imprint, Sierra Club Books. They also published the John Muir library, which includes many of their founder's titles. SCC was dissolved in 2023.

The Sierra Club Voter Education Fund is a 527 group that became active in the 2004 Presidential election by airing television advertisements about the major party candidates' positions on environmental issues. Through the Environmental Voter Education Campaign (EVEC), the club sought to mobilize volunteers for phone banking, door-to-door canvassing and postcard writing to emphasize these issues in the campaign.

== Budget and funding ==
The Sierra Club's annual budget was $88 million in 2011 and $100 million in 2012. In 2023, the group's budget was $173 million.

In 2008, Clorox donated $1.3 million to the Sierra Club in exchange for the right to display the Sierra Club's logo on a line of cleaning products.

In February 2012, it was reported that the Sierra Club had secretly accepted over $26 million in gifts from the natural gas industry, mostly from Aubrey McClendon, CEO of Chesapeake Energy. The Sierra Club used the Chesapeake Energy money for its Beyond Coal campaign to block new coal-fired power plants and close old ones. Michael Brune reported that he learned of the gifts after he succeeded Carl Pope as executive director of the Sierra Club in 2010. Brune reported that he ended the financial agreement with natural gas industry interests.

In 2013 Naomi Klein wrote on the club taking large, multi-million dollar funding from fossil fuel interests, had begun to spark "major controversy" within it and other "environmental" groups that were in similar receipt of fossil funding.

In 2014, the Energy and Environment Legal Institute filed a referral with the Internal Revenue Service pointing out that Sierra Club and Sierra Club Foundation were not paying income taxes from sales of solar panels for their partners across the US.

The Sierra Club has an affiliated super PAC. It spent $1,000,575 on the 2014 elections, all of it opposing Republican candidates for office. The Sierra Club is a partner of America Votes, an organization that coordinates and promotes progressive issues.

Donors to the Sierra Club have included David Gelbaum, Michael Bloomberg, the William and Flora Hewlett Foundation and the John D. and Catherine T. MacArthur Foundation. The Sierra Club has also received funding from the Democracy Alliance and the Tides Foundation Advocacy Fund.

In 2015, a PR group, known as the Environmental Policy Alliance, claimed that the Sierra Club and other U.S. environmental groups received funding from groups with ties to Russia's state-owned oil company.

In April 2023, the Sierra Club announced a restructuring plan in response to a $40 million budget deficit. The following month, the union representing about 400 employees said that dozens of layoffs had occurred, and it filed two complaints with the National Labor Relations Board.

== Criticisms ==
=== Stance on housing ===
The Sierra Club has come under criticism for opposing high-density housing development projects in California, which are intended to reduce the state's housing shortage and reduce greenhouse gas emissions. Ethan Elkind, director of the climate program at the Center for Law, Energy and the Environment (CLEE) at UC Berkeley Law, said that the Sierra Club's opposition to California Senate Bill 827—which would require cities to allow denser and taller housing near public transport centers and ease the parking requirements that cities can impose on housing developments—was "surprising". He wrote, "is Sierra Club an organization of wealthy homeowners who want to keep newcomers out of their upscale, transit-rich areas? Or are they actually committed to fighting climate change by providing enough housing for Californians in low-carbon, infill areas? Because their opposition to SB 827 unfortunately indicates more of the former than the latter."

In 2023, the Sierra Club of Hawaii criticized Governor Josh Green for issuing an emergency declaration on Hawaii's housing shortage and issuing an executive order that streamlined housing construction in Hawaii and suspended various stringent land use regulations.

In 2025, the New Jersey chapter was criticized for its opposition to an affordable housing project in Cranbury.

=== Potential foreign influence ===
In late 2020, Representative Liz Cheney of Wyoming asked the United States Department of Justice (DOJ) to investigate environmental groups such as the Sierra Club, saying that "robust political and judicial activism—combined with the fact that these groups often espouse views that align with those of our adversaries—makes it all the more critical that the Department is aware of any potential foreign influence within or targeting these groups."

=== Trips to Israel ===
In early 2021, as reported by MondoWeiss, a range of pro-Palestinian organizations demanded that the Sierra Club cancel "greenwashing" trips to "apartheid" Israel. As a result, the Sierra Club announced cancellation of two forthcoming trips, but quickly reversed its decision, saying it was "hastily" made "without consulting a robust set of stakeholders". MondoWeiss said it subsequently announced a rescheduled trip, which included visits to the Golan Heights and Palestinian territories, but did not cancel the trip.

=== Political involvement ===
Sierra club has been criticized for participating in political advocacy outside of the context of environmentalism. Sierra Club has increasingly pursued non-environmental political goals, and as a result has been criticized for becoming a highly partisan organization and losing their focus on environmental protection, as well as having a growing divide between Sierra Club and its donors who generally donate for environmentalism.

For example, an article by Ben Jealous published in the club's official magazine Sierra strongly endorsed Kamala Harris' for her stance on abortion, and makes no mention of environmentalism throughout the article. In 2020 Sierra published an article by Heather Smith in which she advocates to 'Defund the Police'.

A report by the New York times states that from 2019 to 2025, Sierra club lost 60% of it 4 Million members and supporters, which the report attributes to its shift towards non-environmental political stances. The Sierra Club's official policies and publications take left-wing stances on issues such as immigration, transgenderism, and reparations for African Americans.

=== Ramona Strategies Report ===
In June 2021, an executive summary of a report by D.C. consulting firm Ramona Strategies described widespread problems involving harassment, workplace discrimination, and organization protection of abusive senior leadership. The report was commissioned in 2020 after a rape accusation made against a volunteer leader became public and published in August 2021 by The Intercept. It acknowledged the Sierra Club's reliance on volunteer leadership presented unique challenges and advised reforming its structure as part of a "restorative accountability process". On August 13, 2021, Michael Brune announced that he would be stepping down as executive director after eleven years, and apologized for any time that volunteers and staff did not "feel safe, supported, and valued". Politico called the resignation, "a major blow to the U.S. environmental movement and the Democratic party's green base".

== Internal elections ==
Sierra Club's long history of internal elections has repeatedly exposed deep rifts over its mission and how it should adapt to changing visions of environmentalism.

=== 1969 – Ansel Adams vs. David Brower ===
A conservative slate led by Ansel Adams defeated allies of David Brower, the Club's visionary but controversial executive director, who championed bold conservation campaigns against Grand Canyon dams and for redwood parks. The clash symbolized a divide between the Sierra Club's traditional hiking-club roots and its emerging identity as a national political force for environmental protection. Brower was soon ousted, marking the Club's first great identity crisis.

=== 1998–2004 – Immigration and the lawsuit ===
By the late 1990s, members split over whether population growth and immigration were legitimate environmental concerns. The fight culminated in Club Members For An Honest Election v. Sierra Club (2004), in which dissidents sued over alleged ballot manipulation in the board elections. The California Supreme Court ruled in 2008 in favor of the Sierra Club, affirming its internal election procedures.

=== 2022 – John Muir and modern reckoning ===
After executive director Michael Brune acknowledged founder John Muir's racist statements, tensions erupted over the Club's legacy, workplace culture, and reform efforts guided by the Ramona Strategies report. Volunteers accused leadership of eroding grassroots power in favor of professional staff and DEI reforms.

=== 2015–2025 – Housing ===
Some chapters and groups in different states have fought over pro-housing "YIMBY" activism, as newer members link infill housing and transit to climate action, while traditionalists see threats to conservation priorities.

== Leadership ==
=== Presidents ===
Presidents of the Sierra Club have included:

- 1892–1914 John Muir
- 1915–1917 Joseph N. LeConte
- 1919–1922 William F. Badè
- 1922–1924 Clair S. Tappaan
- 1925–1927 Walter L. Huber
- 1927–1928 Aurelia Harwood
- 1928–1931 Duncan McDuffie
- 1931–1933 Phil S. Bernays
- 1933–1935 Francis P. Farquhar
- 1936–1937 Ernest Dawson
- 1937–1940 Joel H. Hildebrand
- 1940–1941 Francis D. Tappaan
- 1941–1943 Walter A. Starr
- 1943–1946 Duncan McDuffie
- 1946–1948 Bestor Robinson
- 1948–1949 Francis P. Farquhar
- 1949–1951 Lewis F. Clark
- 1951–1953 Harold E. Crowe
- 1953–1955 Richard M. Leonard
- 1955–1957 Alexander Hildebrand
- 1957–1959 Harold C. Bradley
- 1959–1961 Nathan C. Clark
- 1961–1964 Edgar Wayburn
- 1964–1966 William E. Siri
- 1966–1967 George Marshall
- 1967–1969 Edgar Wayburn
- 1969–1971 Phillip S. Berry
- 1971–1973 Raymond Sherwin
- 1973–1974 Laurence I. Moss
- 1974–1976 Kent Gill
- 1976–1977 Brant Calkin
- 1977–1978 William Futrell
- 1978–1980 Theodore Snyder
- 1980–1982 Joseph Fontaine
- 1982–1984 Denny Shaffer
- 1984–1986 Michele Perrault
- 1986–1988 Lawrence (Larry) Downing
- 1988–1990 Richard Cellars
- 1990–1991 Susan Merrow
- 1991–1992 Phillip Berry
- 1993–1994 Michele Perrault
- 1994–1996 Robbie Cox
- 1996–1998 Adam Werbach
- 1998–2000 Chuck McGrady
- 2000–2001 Robbie Cox
- 2001–2003 Jennifer Ferenstein
- 2003–2005 Larry Fahn
- 2005–2007 Lisa Renstrom
- 2007–2008 Robbie Cox
- 2008–2010 Allison Chin
- 2010–2012 Robin Mann
- 2012–2013 Allison Chin
- 2013–2015 Dave Scott
- 2015–2017 Aaron Mair
- 2017–2020 Loren Blackford
- 2020–2023 Ramón Cruz
- 2023–present Allison Chin

=== Executive directors ===
The Sierra Club's executive directors have included:

- 1952–1969 David R. Brower
- 1969–1985 J. Michael McCloskey
- 1985–1986 Douglas Wheeler
- 1987–1992 Michael L. Fischer
- 1992–2010 Carl Pope
- 2010–2021 Michael Brune
- 2022–2025 Ben Jealous
- 2025–present Loren Blackford

=== Directors ===
- Ansel Adams, 1934–1971
- David Brower, 1941–1953; 1983–1988; 1995–2000
- William Edward Colby
- Leland Curtis 1943–1946
- George Davidson 1894–1910
- Glen Dawson
- Michael Dorsey 1997–2003; 2009–2010; 2014–2017
- Jim Dougherty
- William O. Douglas
- Veronica Eady, 1998–1999
- Anne H. Ehrlich
- Jules Eichorn
- Jennifer Ferenstein, 2001–2003
- Dave Foreman
- Lisa Force, 2003–2006
- Betsy Gaines, 1997–2000
- Marcia Hanscom, 2002–2005
- Chad Hanson, 1997–2003, 2018–
- David Starr Jordan
- Doug La Follette, 2003–2006
- Joseph LeConte, 1892–1898
- Richard M. Leonard
- Vivian Li
- Martin Litton, 1964–1973
- Norman Livermore
- Alexander George McAdie
- Duncan McDuffie
- Maryann Nelson
- Charlie Ogle, 1999–2002
- Edward Taylor (E.T.) Parsons, 1904-1914
- Marion Randall Parsons, 1914-1938
- Eliot Porter
- Bestor Robinson
- Richard C. Sill
- William E. Siri
- Wallace Stegner
- René Voss, 1999–2002
- Adam Werbach
- Paul Watson, 2003–2006
- Bernie Zaleha, 2003–2009
- Ben Zuckerman, 2002–2005

== See also ==
- Sierra Club v. Babbitt
- Conservation movement
- Conservation ethic
- Echo Park Dam, defeating its construction in 1950s
- Environmental education
- Environmental history of the United States
  - Environmental movement, for recent activities
  - Environmental movement in the United States
- Grassroots Campaigns, Inc.
- Habitat conservation
- List of environmental organizations
- Massachusetts v. Environmental Protection Agency
- Sierra Club v. Morton
- Timeline of history of environmentalism
