= Phillip Berry =

Phillip Berry may refer to:

- Phillip O. Berry Academy of Technology
- Phillip S. Berry (1937–2013), president of the Sierra Club
- Philip H. Berry (1971-), Artist Author Musician

== See also ==
- Philip Berry
- Philip Haggard Berry
