= Aaron Mair =

American environmentalist

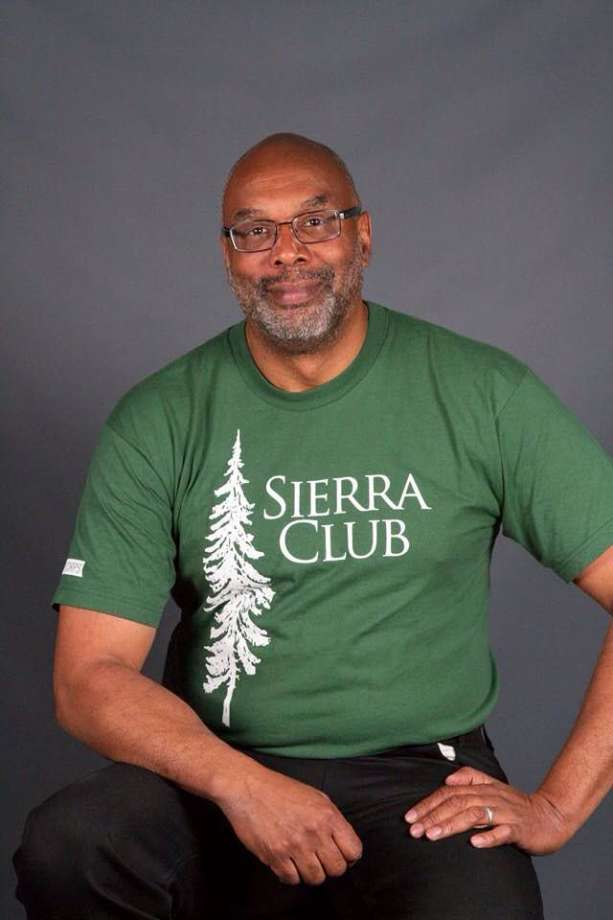
- Born: Valhalla, New York
- Occupations: Public Health, Civil Rights, Environmental Justice
- Years active: 1980 - Current
- Known for: Environmental Activism, Reapportionment, Voter Rights, Civil Rights, and Labor Rights
- Notable work: Albany New York Solid Waste Energy Recovery System (A.N.S.W.E.R.S.) shutdown and litigation. Hudson River organizer in PCB cleanup. http://www.clearwater.org/latest-news/aaron-mair-environmental-justice-advocate-heads-sierra-club/

Aaron Mair is an epidemiological-spatial analyst, environmentalist, and past president of the Sierra Club, an American environmental organization founded by preservationist John Muir in 1892. He is involved in the environmental justice movement.

Mair was elected president of the Sierra Club on May 16, 2015, and served through May 20, 2017. He was the organization's first African American president. He lives in Schenectady, New York and works for the New York State Department of Health.

Mair is a 1984 graduate of Binghamton University, where he received a Bachelor of Arts in History and Sociology and a certificate in Southwest Asia and North Africa Studies. Mair also trained at Rhode Island's Naval Education and Training Center and attended The American University in Cairo. He participated in Binghamton University's Political Science Doctoral Program, but left the program to begin State service in 1988.

Mair has been a member of the Sierra Club since 1999. Since that time, he has held many leadership positions with the Sierra Club: National Environmental Justice and Community Partnerships Chair 2010–present; National Diversity Council 2008-2010. Atlantic Chapter: Environmental Justice 2003-2004; Chapter Chair 2002-2003. Hudson Mohawk Group: International Human Rights/Environment 2003–present; Environmental Justice 2002-2008; Water Quality/Habitats 2006-2011.

In 1995, Mair founded the Arbor Hill Environmental Justice Corporation, which was a member of the White House Council on Environmental Quality from 1998 to 2000. He also founded, served as board member, and lectured at the W. Haywood Burns Environmental Education Center in the Albany Capital region of New York. In 1999, Mair was a member of Friends of Clean Hudson. In 2000, Mair received an EPA Environmental Quality Award for clean up of polychlorinated biphenyls (PCBs) on the Hudson River. Mair also served as a board member at the New York League of Conservation Voters in 2000.

After retiring from the State of New York in 2021, Mair joined the Adirondack Council as director of its Forever Adirondacks policy initiative.
