= John Michael McCloskey =

American lawyer and conservationist

John Michael McCloskey was an American lawyer and conservationist. He served as the executive director of the Sierra Club from 1969 to 1985.

In 2005, McCloskey published the memoir In the Thick of It: My Life in the Sierra Club.
