= Thornewood Open Space Preserve =

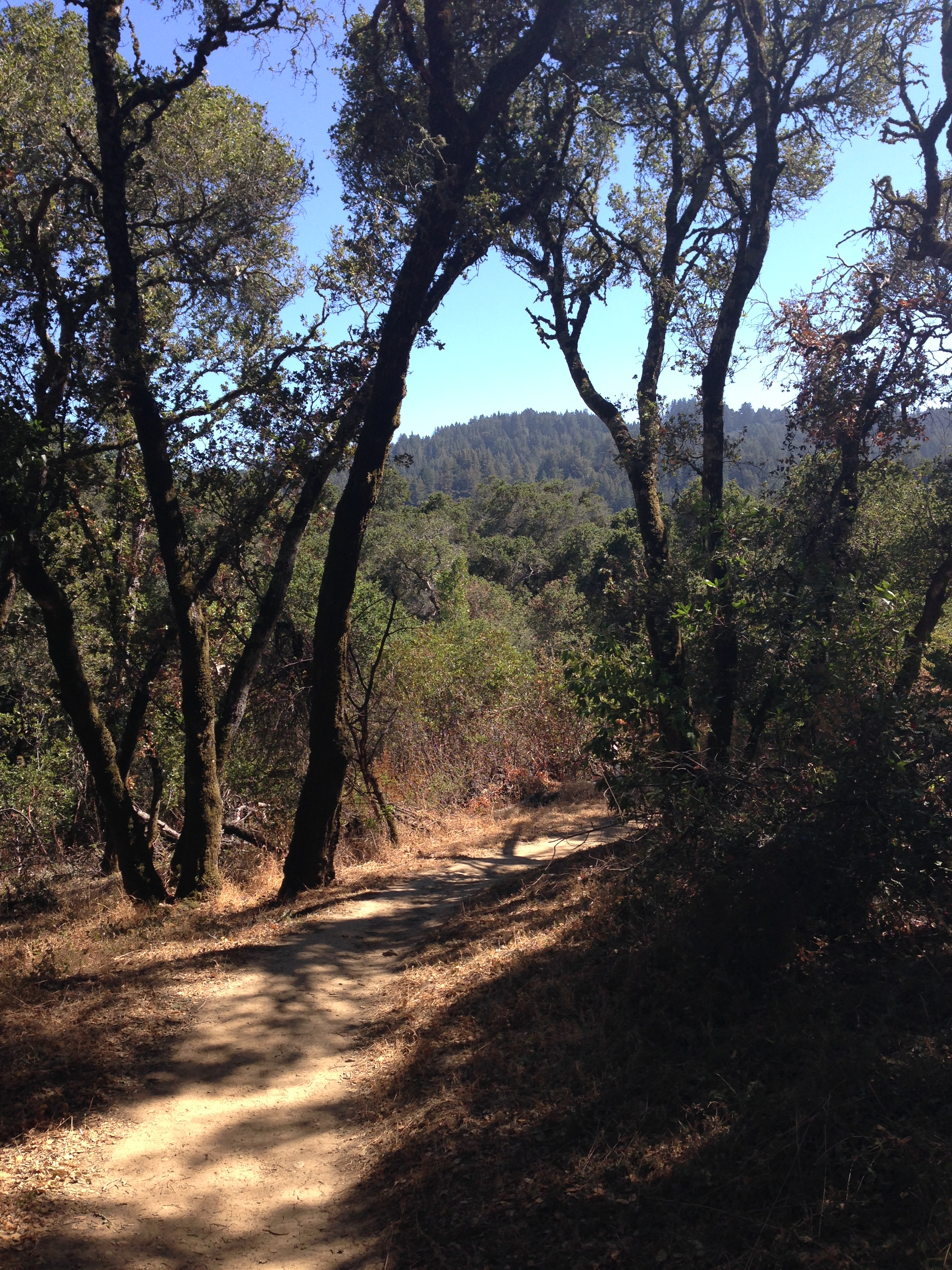
- The Santa Cruz Mountains from Thornewood Open Space Preserve

- Location within California Location within the United States
- Location: San Mateo County, California, United States
- Nearest city: Woodside, California
- Coordinates: 37°23′27.02″N 122°15′33.10″W
- Area: 167 acres (68 ha)
- Governing body: Midpeninsula Regional Open Space District
- Website: MROSP Thornewood

Thornewood Open Space Preserve is a small regional park located in the Santa Cruz Mountains in San Mateo County. The park lies in the San Francisco Bay Area and is operated by the Midpeninsula Regional Open Space District. It offers approximately 1.5 miles (2.4 km) of hiking and equestrian trails and is dog-friendly. The Schilling Lake Trail leads to Schilling Lake, a protected wildlife habitat. This trail offers brief views of the southern San Francisco Bay, Palo Alto (including Stanford University's Hoover Tower) and surrounding cities, and the Diablo Range. From Schilling Lake, the Bridle Trail leads to Old La Honda Road.

The name Thornewood comes from Julian and Edna Bloss Thorne, who developed the land in the 1920s. The Thornes built a house designed by Gardner Daily and surrounded it with extensive gardens. Those gardens included Schilling Lake, named after the nearby August Schilling land. The Thorne and Schilling estates were both part of Rancho Cañada de Raymundo in old California.

When Edna Bloss Thorne died in June 1970, she bequeathed the land to the Sierra Club Foundation, with the requirement that the land surrounding her 86-acre summer home be kept as a nature preserve and not developed. The foundation donated the acreage to the Midpeninsula Regional Open Space District in September 1978. In 1986, Robert Procter and his wife gifted 3.4 acres to the district that were added to the preserve.

Second-growth redwood trees grow in portions of Thornewood Open Space Preserve, especially by the lake. There are false brome grasses throughout the area. In 2005, the district approved a $1.2 million plan to eradicate a newly-discovered invasive strain of slender false brome that was displacing native plants.

== Bibliography ==
- Rusmore, Jean; Spangle, Frances; Crowder, Betsy; LaTourrette, Sue (October 9, 2013). Peninsula Trails: Hiking and Biking Trails on the San Francisco Peninsula. Wilderness Press. pp. 134–135. ISBN 978-0-89997-366-1.
- Grasslands. Vol. 16–19. California Native Grass Association. 2006.
- U.S. Geological Survey Geographic Names Information System: Thornewood Open Space Preserve
