= Sierra Club Foundation =

US non-profit environmental organization

- Formation: 1960
- Type: Charitable organization
- Tax ID no.: 94-6069890
- Legal status: 501(c)(3) organization
- Purpose: Promote efforts to educate and empower people to protect and improve the natural and human environment
- Headquarters: 2101 Webster St Suite 1250
- Location: Oakland, California, US
- Executive Director: Dan Chu
- Key people: Robin Mann, Chair
- Main organ: Board of Directors
- Affiliations: Sierra Club
- Website: www.sierraclubfoundation.org

The Sierra Club Foundation is an American nonprofit charitable organization focused on environmental efforts. It is an independent 501(c)(3) social welfare organization, the fiscal sponsor of the charitable programs of the Sierra Club. The organization's stated mission is to "help educate, inspire, and empower humanity to preserve the natural and human environment."

Based in Oakland, California and founded in 1960, the Sierra Club Foundation funds a range of environmental projects. Notable members of the board of directors have included Lynn Jurich, Mike Richter, and Darren Aronofsky. The corporate officers, as of August 2023, are Robin Mann, Joel Sanders, Jessica Sarowitz, and Rebekah Saul Butler.

In 1999, it was the 14th largest recipient of public donations amongst environmental groups.

According to its 2020 annual report, the foundation awarded just over $80 million in grants to the Sierra Club and to non-profits "to support scientific, educational, literary, organizing, advocacy, and legal programs that further our goals". The largest grant of $29.7 million was to the Sierra Club's Beyond Coal campaign.

== Investments, revenue, and grants ==
In August 1975, the foundation had roughly half its $604,000 portfolio invested with environmental and social criteria in mind, and the other half with a second management firm without such screens that had invested $132,945 in petroleum, timber, and mining companies. Executive Secretary Colburn S. Wilbur explained the investment committee wanted "to see how they would compare".

In 2014, the Sierra Club Foundation announced it would be joining the Divest-Invest philanthropic campaign to more fully align its investment strategy with its mission. Having started to divest in fossil fuel stocks four years prior, the charity pledged to sell its remaining fossil fuel company investments, which it estimated as being less than 1% of its portfolio.

In 2015, the Sierra Club Foundation reported $132 million in assets and $88 million in revenue for the year, with $54 million in grants made. In 2020, it reported $245 million in assets and $117 million in revenue for the year, with $80 million in grants made.

== Notable events ==
=== Thornewood Open Space Preserve ===
When Edna Bloss Thorne, a resident of Woodside, California, died in June 1970, she willed her summer home and its adjoining 86 acres to the foundation, stipulating the land be maintained as a nature preserve. The foundation donated the acreage, worth $500,000 in September 1978, to the Midpeninsula Regional Open Space District. The district assumed the responsibility of paying the $16,600 of unpaid taxes and maintenance costs, and it formed the Thornewood Open Space Preserve.

=== Development project opposition ===
In 1973, the Sierra Club Foundation partnered with a community group, the Citizens for Responsible City Development, to oppose a high-density urban development project on the San Francisco waterfront, alleging the environmental impact study made was invalid. Supporters made tax-deductible contributions to the Sierra Club Foundation, which then forwarded the funds to the citizens group, which was not tax-exempt. Wilbur said in a statement that the two organizations had similar goals, "to help the environment".

=== Frontera fund litigation ===
In 1993, the New Mexico attorney general requested an audit relating to a $100,000 donation made in 1970 slated for a Mexican-American sheepherding cooperative, alleging the Sierra Club Foundation failed to disclose the donation on its tax returns, and later used the funds for general operations. Brant Calkin, Frontera fund administrator and a past president of the Sierra Club, said that after an appropriate parcel of land could not be found, the donor gave permission for the funds to be unrestricted. The case settled in September 1995, with the Sierra Club Foundation agreeing to pay $900,000 to an agricultural cooperative in New Mexico. The donor, Ray A. Graham III, unsuccessfully sued the foundation for fraud and breach of contract. After his case was dismissed, the Sierra Club Foundation sued Graham for malicious prosecution, winning a $2.4 million judgment in 1994 that was upheld on appeal in 1999.

== See also ==
- Sustainability
- Global warming
- Ecology
- Natural environment
- Conservation movement
