= Bridge Canyon Dam =

Proposed dam in Mohave County, Arizona

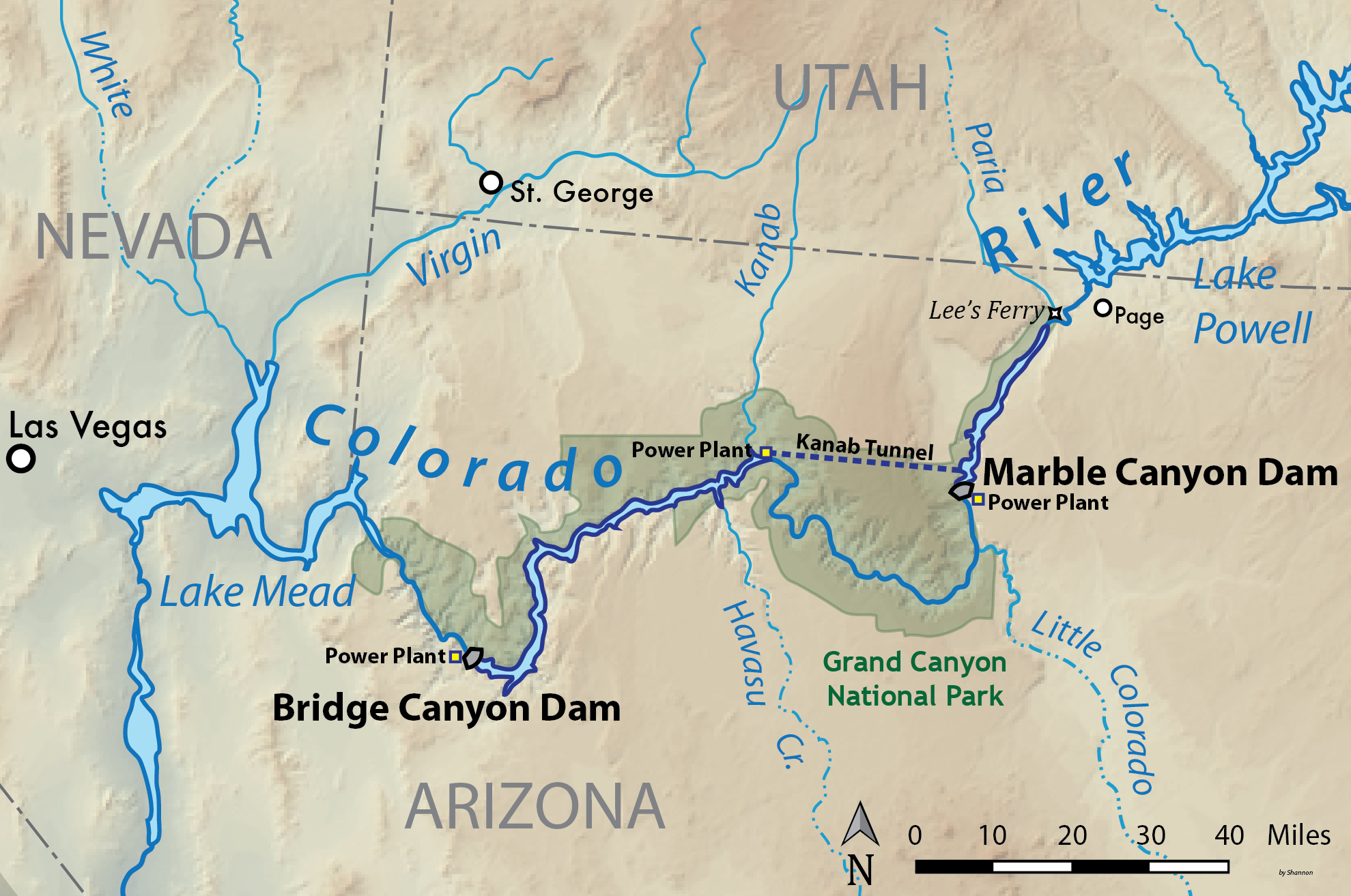
- Map showing the Bridge and Marble Canyon Dam projects

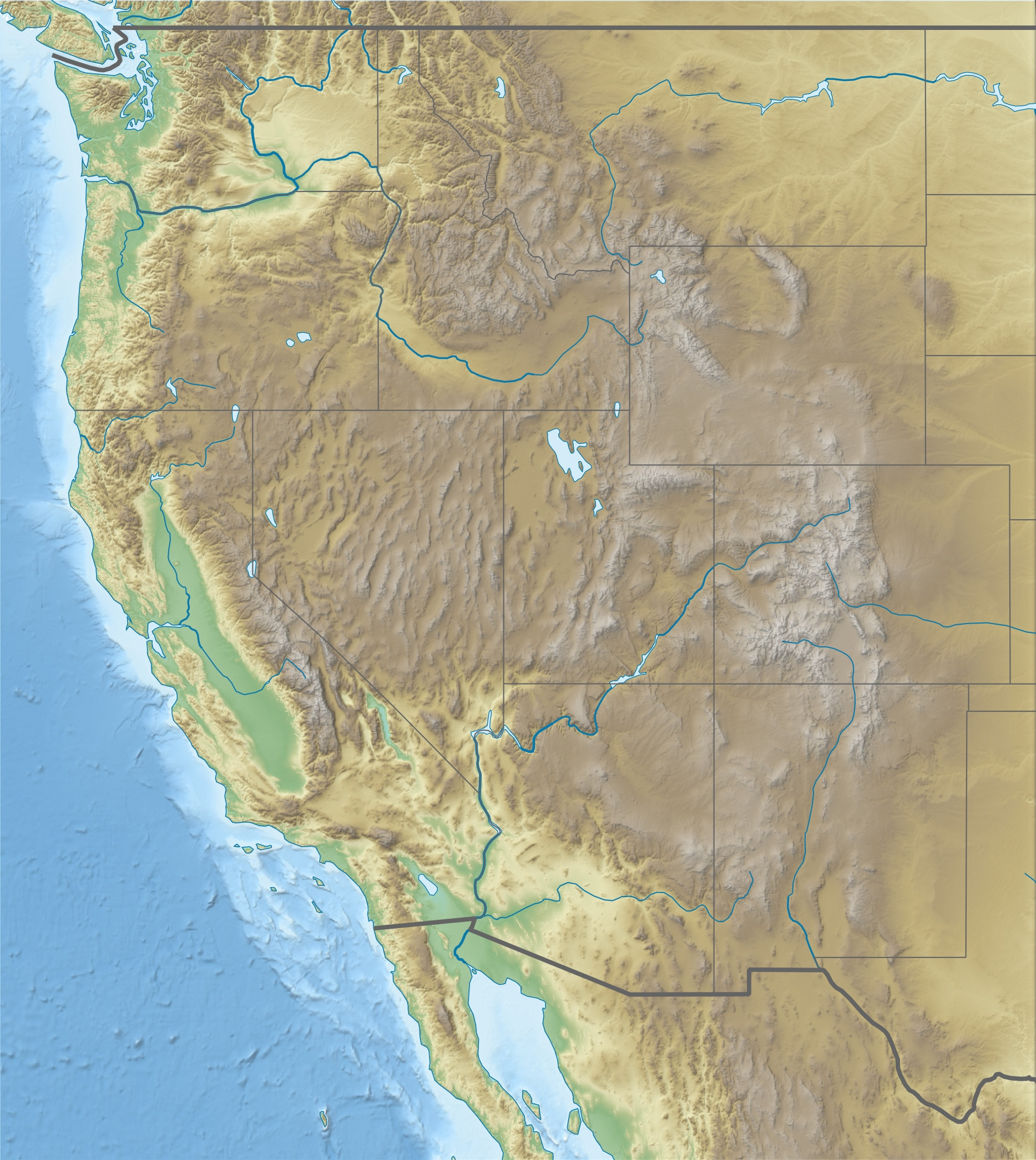
- Location of the proposed Bridge Canyon Dam in the western United States
- Country: United States
- Location: Mohave County, Arizona
- Coordinates: 35°48′53″N 113°34′01″W
- Status: Proposed
- Construction cost: $500 million (est.)
- Owner: U.S. Bureau of Reclamation

Dam and spillways
- Impounds: Colorado River
- Height: 740 ft (230 m)
- Length: 1,700 ft (520 m)

Reservoir
- Creates: Bridge Canyon Reservoir
- Total capacity: 3,710,000 acre⋅ft (4.58 km^{3})
- Catchment area: 140,000 sq mi (360,000 km^{2})
- Surface area: 24,000 acres (9,700 ha)
- Normal elevation: 1,866 ft (569 m)

Power Station
- Hydraulic head: 672 ft (205 m)
- Installed capacity: 1,500 MW
- Annual generation: 5.36 billion KWh

Bridge Canyon Dam, also called Hualapai Dam, was a proposed dam in the lower Grand Canyon of the Colorado River, in northern Arizona in the United States. It would have been located near Bridge Canyon Rapids in an extremely rugged and isolated portion of the canyon, 235 miles (378 km) downstream of Lees Ferry and at the uppermost end of Lake Mead.

First proposed in the 1920s, the project was seriously considered by the U.S. Bureau of Reclamation for a period of over twenty years from the early 1950s to 1968. If built, the dam would have stood 740 feet (230 m) high, forming a reservoir stretching more than ninety miles (140 km) upstream, including thirteen miles (21 km) along the border of Grand Canyon National Park. The dam would serve mainly for hydropower production in conjunction with several others further upstream including Marble Canyon Dam, on the Colorado, Green and other rivers.

Due to its enormous potential for environmental destruction and the dwindling flows of the Colorado River, the project stalled in 1968 after years of public opposition. However, the location is considered one of the best remaining sites for a large dam in the western United States.

== Background ==
Bridge Canyon Dam was first seriously considered in the mid-20th century as part of the Pacific Southwest Water Plan, which aimed to deliver water from the Colorado River to central Arizona in order to allow that state to utilize its full allotment in the Colorado River Compact. The proposed project would involve a canal running from Lake Havasu on the Colorado River to supply metro Phoenix and the surrounding irrigated lands. A pair of dams within the Grand Canyon would provide the hydroelectric power necessary to pump the water 300 feet (91 m) uphill along the canal's course. One of these dams would be located at the lower end of Marble Canyon and was known as Marble Canyon or Redwall Dam; the other, known as Bridge Canyon Dam or Hualapai Dam, would be situated in Bridge Canyon in Lower Granite Gorge. The two dams would generate a combined 12.2 billion kilowatt hours (KWh) annually with a total installed capacity between 2000 and 3000 megawatts (MW).

In the 1940s, Reclamation began investigating potential sites for a dam in the lower Grand Canyon near the river's confluence with Diamond Creek, 25 to 40 miles (40 to 64 km) upstream of Lake Mead. A small tent city was erected along the Colorado River near Bridge Canyon, complete with "a tar-paper cook shack with tables, a walk-in refrigerator attached, and tents or sleeping accommodations for the men… a small generating plant which furnished lights and fans for the swamp-type air conditioners which were a necessity in this canyon." The site was only accessible by a 30-mile (48 km) boat trip up the Colorado River from Lake Mead, and was plagued by torrid heat, poor access, floods and long working hours.

After more than four potential damsites were investigated, the best one was found at a location called the "Lower Gneiss" site below the confluence of Gneiss Canyon, a small tributary, and 19 miles (31 km) northwest of the small town of Peach Springs. The dam was proposed as a concrete arch-gravity structure 736 to 740 feet (224 to 226 m) high above its foundations, with a hydraulic head from 666 to 672 feet (203 to 205 m). It would raise the water behind it for 93 miles (150 km) upstream to an elevation of 1,876 feet (572 m) just below the mouth of Kanab Creek.

== Defeat ==
After proposals for the dam surfaced, they met with almost immediate opposition from environmental groups such as the Sierra Club, as well as an outcry from recreation-minded general public. The reason for this was because the dam would back water up for 13 miles (21 km) along the border of Grand Canyon National Park, and 40 miles (64 km) through Grand Canyon National Monument. The resistance was strengthened by previous controversies relating to the encroachment of dams and reservoirs on protected lands, most notably O'Shaughnessy Dam, built in Yosemite National Park in 1924; the Glen Canyon Dam, completed in 1966, and the earlier controversy over the U.S. of Bureau of Reclamation's proposed Echo Park Dam, which would have flooded sections of Utah's Dinosaur National Monument.

All of the proposals thus far for the dam had failed for one reason or another. In 1938, the state of Arizona attempted to gain federal permission to build the dam. Again in 1950, a bill was introduced in Congress for a Bridge Canyon Dam that would serve the water diversion purposes of the CAP. This time, it was not activists who killed it but rather representatives from California in the United States House of Representatives. This was because California did not want Arizona's utilization of its share of the Colorado River to increase, which would mean possible shortfall of water supplies in that state.

Even though the hypothetical dam and its reservoir lie along a remote, seldom seen or visited reach of the Colorado River, it would still destroy many well-known landmarks and points of interest. These include lower Havasu Creek, famed for its travertine formations and waterfalls, and Lava Falls, one of the most spectacular rapids on the Colorado. Opponents stated that the relatively low storage capacity of the dam, as well as its potential to evaporate more than 85,000 acre-feet (105,000,000 m^{3}) of water per year, do not justify the dam's destruction of natural features and disruption to river ecology and recreational activities.

Because of the heavy silt load of the Colorado, Bridge Canyon Reservoir would eventually fill with sediment, rendering it useless. Estimates by the Sierra Club suggested a useful life span of 60–160 years, while the U.S. Bureau of Reclamation predicts 163 years. The U.S. Bureau of Reclamation suggested building additional dams on Kanab Creek, the Little Colorado River and Paria River to act as silt traps in order to prolong the life span up to 250 years. The completion of Glen Canyon Dam 251 miles (404 km) upstream in 1966 effectively reduced the flow of sediment through the Grand Canyon by 85 percent, extending the Bridge Canyon project life indefinitely. However, this alone was not enough to save the dam. As a result, the Bridge Canyon project officially stalled in 1984.

The Pacific Southwest Water Plan was eventually implemented on a limited scale and is now known as the Central Arizona Project. In order to replace the power that would have been provided by Bridge and Marble Canyon Dams, the coal-fired Navajo Generating Station was completed near Page, Arizona in 1976.

== Works cited ==
- Palmer, Tim (2004). Endangered rivers and the conservation movement. Rowman & Littlefield. ISBN 0-7425-3141-4.
- Powell, James Lawrence (2008). Dead pool: Lake Powell, global warming, and the future of water in the west. University of California Press. ISBN 978-0-520-25477-0.
- Russell, Jeffrey S. (2003). Perspectives in civil engineering: commemorating the 150th anniversary of the American Society of Civil Engineers. American Society of Civil Engineers Publications. ISBN 0-7844-0686-3.
