= Marble Canyon Dam =

Proposed dam in Coconino County, Arizona

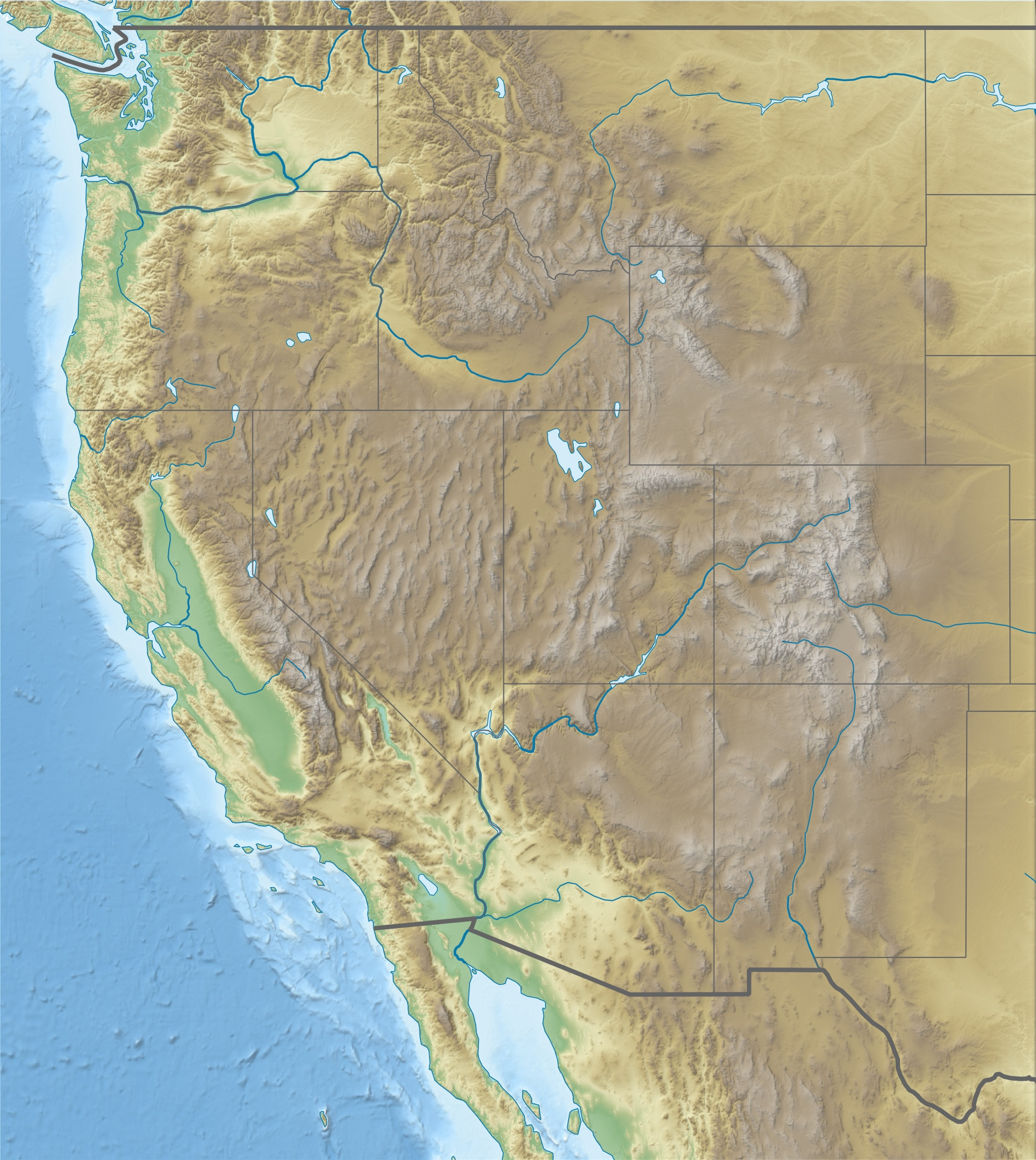
- Location of the proposed Marble Canyon Dam in the western United States, lower site
- Country: United States
- Location: Coconino County, Arizona
- Coordinates: 36°25′3″N 111°52′7″W
- Status: Proposed
- Construction cost: $238 million (est.)
- Owner: U.S. Bureau of Reclamation

Dam and spillways
- Impounds: Colorado River
- Height: 310 ft (94 m)

Reservoir
- Creates: Marble Canyon Reservoir
- Total capacity: 363,000 acre⋅ft (0.448 km^{3})
- Normal elevation: 3,140 ft (960 m)

Power Station
- Installed capacity: 600 MW
- Annual generation: 2.31 billion KWh

The Marble Canyon Dam, also known as the Redwall Dam, was a proposed dam on the Colorado River in Arizona, United States. The dam was intended to impound a relatively small reservoir in the central portion of Marble Canyon to develop hydroelectric power. Plans centered on two sites between miles 30 and 40 in the canyon. At one point a 38-mile (61 km) tunnel was proposed to a site just outside Grand Canyon National Park to develop the site's full power generation potential, reducing the Colorado River to a trickle through the park.

Although first proposed in the 1920s to generate hydroelectricity, work did not begin until the dam was incorporated as part of the U.S. Bureau of Reclamation (USBR)'s Pacific Southwest Water Plan in the 1940s for its Central Arizona component. Together with Bridge Canyon Dam, located at the lower end of the Grand Canyon, it would have provided the hydroelectric power necessary to lift Colorado River water from Lake Havasu to central Arizona's farms and cities, including Phoenix and Tucson. The two dams would have operated as "cash register" facilities to provide funds for future reclamation projects through the sale of cheap hydropower.

After a series of studies and site investigations, the dam was abandoned as a project in order to facilitate legislation creating the Central Arizona Project. The dam sites were incorporated into Marble Canyon National Monument in 1968, which was absorbed into Grand Canyon National Park in 1975.

== Project description ==
First proposed in the 1940s by the United States Bureau of Reclamation, the location in Marble Canyon was regarded as one of the most remote and difficult-to-access dam sites in the United States, about 2,500 feet (760 m) below the rim of the canyon. The proposed dam was of moderate size, about 310 feet (94 m) high, using a thin-arch concrete design and retaining about 363,000 acre-feet. To keep the small reservoir free of silt, silt retention dams were needed on the tributary canyons. The retention dam in Paria Canyon was planned to be 380 feet (120 m) tall, and only 70 feet (21 m) wide at the base and 120 feet (37 m) wide at the crest, retaining 100 years of silt deposits. Despite these measures, the Marble Canyon reservoir was projected to have a lifespan of 104 years before filling with silt.

One appealing aspect of a Marble Canyon damsite was the potential to develop the Grand Canyon's hydroelectric potential without building a dam or reservoir in Grand Canyon National Park, by diverting about 90% of the Colorado River's waters at Marble Canyon into a 38-mile (61 km) tunnel, 36 feet (11 m) in diameter and capable of carrying about 14,000 cubic feet per second (400 m^{3}/s), to a site in the western part of the canyon in what was then Kaibab National Forest. The plan would provide about 1,300 feet (400 m) of hydraulic head for power generation. The power plant would produce about 6.5 billion kilowatt hours (KWh) per year – almost twice that of Hoover Dam. The tunnel would allow the hydroelectric system to effectively bypass Grand Canyon National Park, avoiding the construction of more dams within the park between Marble and Bridge. A flow of 1,000 cubic feet per second (28 m^{3}/s) would be released from Marble Canyon at all times – a "scenic trickle" – for wildlife and recreational purposes in the Grand Canyon. This water would be released through a 22 megawatt power station at the base of the dam, with an annual energy production of 164 million kilowatt hours. Together, the two dams would utilize most of the 1,900-foot (580 m) elevation drop between Lee's Ferry and Lake Mead, which represents one of the biggest untapped hydroelectric potentials in the United States.

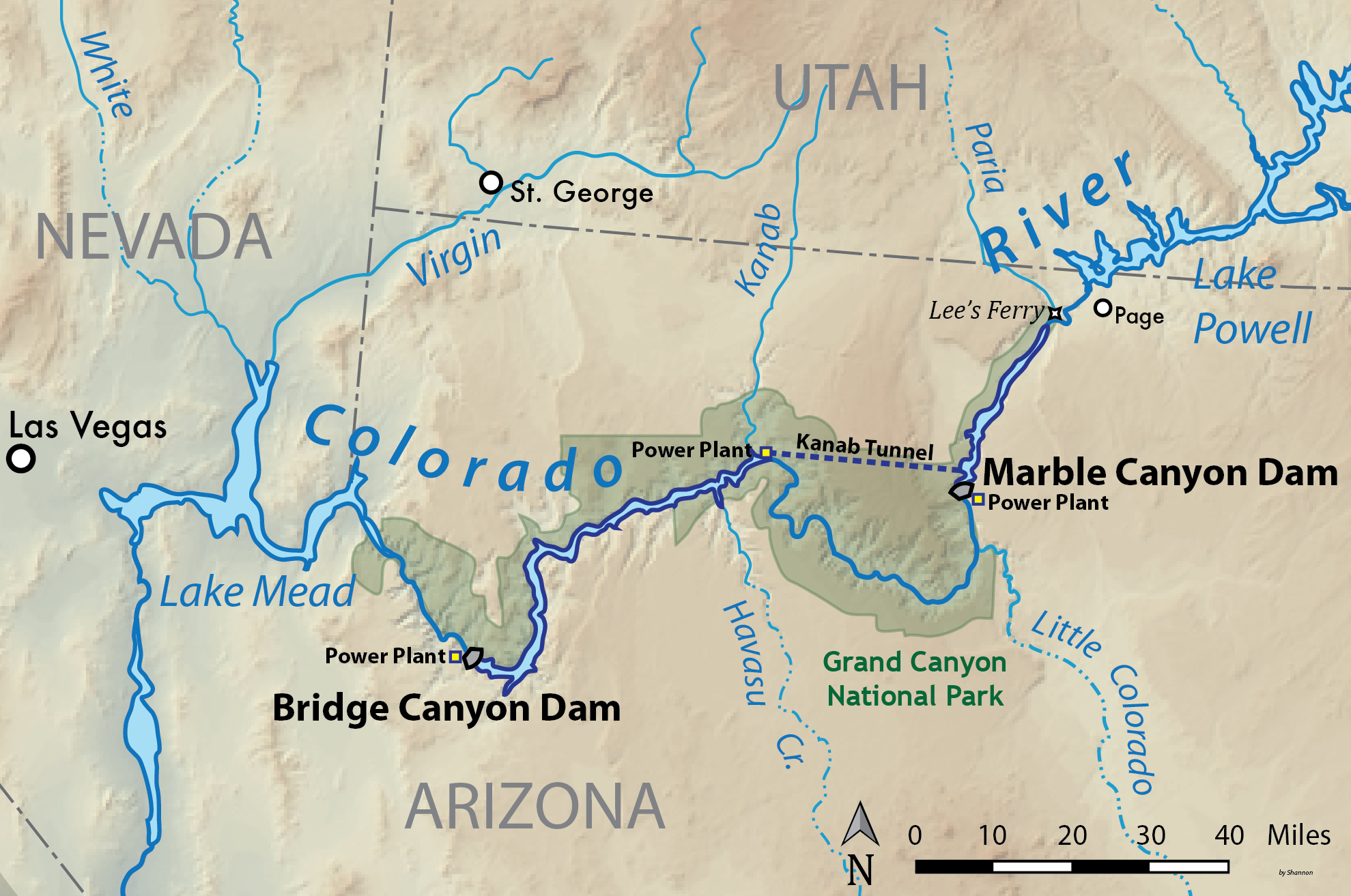
Map showing the Marble and Bridge Canyon Dam projects proposed by the Bureau of Reclamation

A number of accessory lakes or pools were projected in the adjacent Deer Creek drainage, or possibly at a 450-foot (140 m) dam on Kanab Creek. The power station at Deer Creek would have been at the head of the reservoir backed up by the never-built Bridge Canyon Dam. By the 1960s the tunnel project had been dropped in favor of a 600 MW power station at the dam's base, reducing the project's costs considerably.

The two dams would be operated as "cash register" power plants, meaning that sale of hydroelectricity would pay for their construction cost as well as provide funds for future reclamation projects. The power thus produced would be vital for pumping along the Central Arizona Project (CAP), which would lift water from the Colorado River near Lake Havasu to central and southern Arizona. The pumped water would reach as far as Tucson, which sits about 2,000 feet (610 m) higher than the Colorado River. The Bureau had even grander visions, too: eventually, this generated revenue would be necessary to fund water import projects from the Columbia River system to the Colorado River, which continues to face shortages due to over-appropriation of its flow. Thus, "hydropower at Bridge and Marble Canyon Dams was viewed as an instrument and not as a major goal in itself".

== Exploration ==
The feasibility of Marble Canyon Dam was first explored in the 1920s by the United States Geological Survey, which designated sites for "an unbroken string of [hydroelectric] dams from the mountains of Colorado and Wyoming to the last canyons of the Colorado River along the California/Arizona border". Although the Bureau of Reclamation expressed interest at this time in developing hydroelectric generation at the Marble site, these plans were postponed in favor of building the Hoover Dam, which would provide a much greater storage capacity for irrigation and flood control. However, once Hoover was completed the Bureau once again set its sights on the Grand Canyon, which has the greatest hydroelectric potential of any canyon in the American Southwest. In the late 1940s, crews led by Bureau engineer Bert Lucas began to survey Marble Canyon and identified at least two suitable dam sites, one 32.8 miles (52.8 km) below Lee's Ferry and the second at 39.4 miles (63.4 km). A 25-mile (40 km) road had to be built to connect the nearest highway to "one of the most inaccessible damsites ever explored by Bureau of Reclamation engineers".

In 1949 the Bureau opened bids for the construction of a 3,400-foot (1,000 m) cableway to transport workers and materials down into the remote canyon at Mile 32.8. Once the cableway was completed, a temporary camp was set up on the bottom of the gorge, and exploratory drilling work commenced in 1951. The work at the lower site at river mile 39.5 left two drifts measuring about 5 feet (1.5 m) by 7 feet (2.1 m) and about 50 feet (15 m) deep in the cliffs on either side of the river, together with 32 drill holes in the river bed. At the upper site, about 7 miles (11 km) upstream at river mile 32.8, there were a total of 35 drill holes and two drifts 100 feet (30 m) and 75 feet (23 m) deep. The work sites were accessed by an aerial tram from the rim. Although the lower site was preferred due to an additional 30 feet (9.1 m) of hydraulic head and potentially 45% larger reservoir than was possible at the upper site, it required more work to remediate weak rock joints. The project was not pursued by the Bureau of Reclamation in the 1950s. In 1960 the Arizona Power Authority became interested in the site, whose reservoir would have been entirely in Arizona, giving the state control over the waters and power generation. In 1963 the effort was endorsed by Bureau of Reclamation director Floyd Dominy. Investigations for the project's feasibility report extended into 1964. In 1965 a Bureau of Reclamation report concluded that solution cavities in the upstream limestone would prevent the reservoir from holding water. By 1968, as part of a bargain between the Arizona delegation to Congress, which supported the Central Arizona Project, and the California delegation, which opposed the project and the dam, the Marble Canyon project was dropped from the plan.

== Abandonment ==
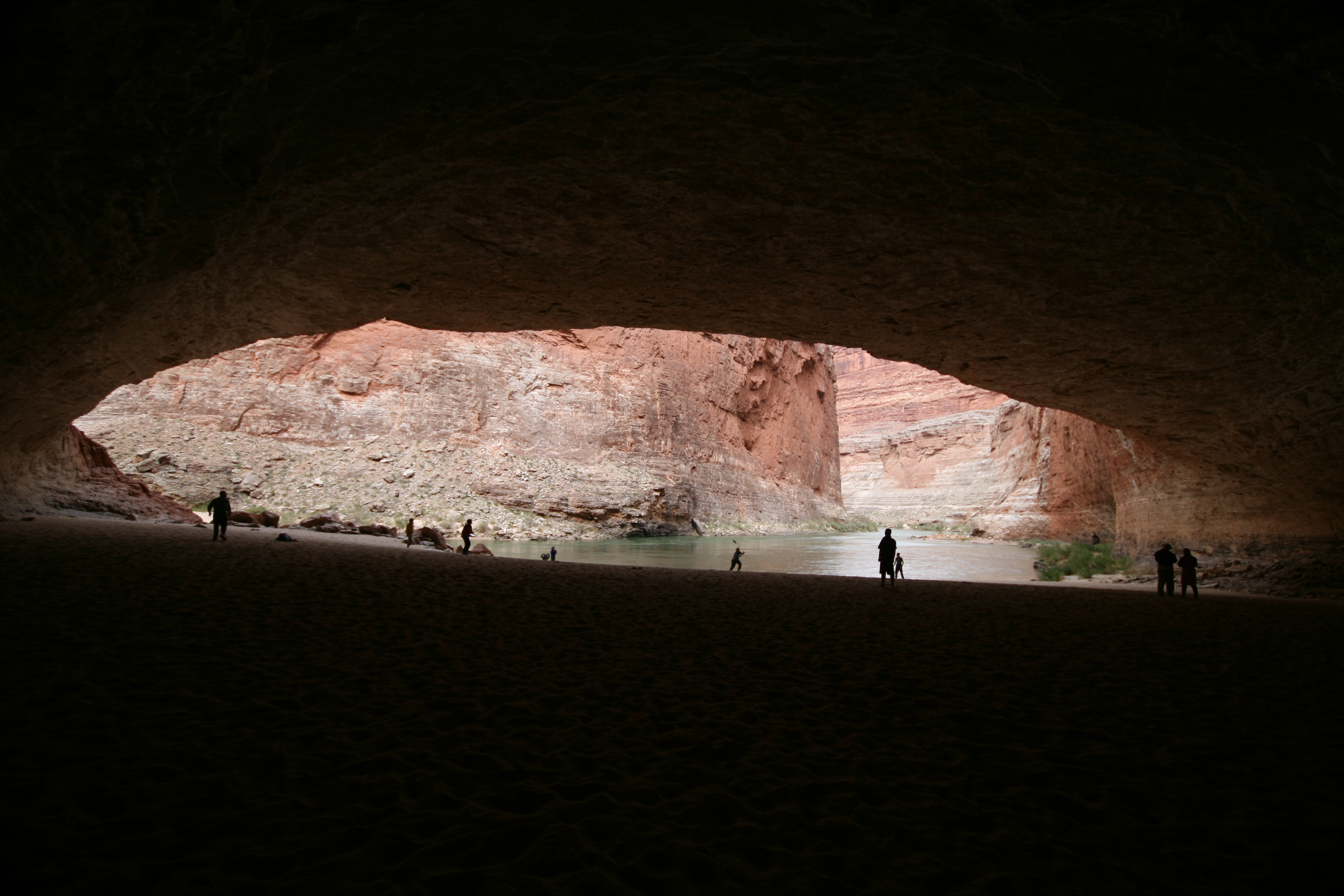
Redwall Cavern would have been flooded by the lower dam

In 1969 President Lyndon B. Johnson proclaimed the establishment of Marble Canyon National Monument, effectively forestalling the possibility of a dam in Marble Canyon. In 1975 the monument was added to Grand Canyon National Park by the Grand Canyon Enlargement Act. The lower dam would have flooded a number of natural features, including Redwall Cavern and Vasey's Paradise. The upper dam was located just above the cavern, and was sometimes referred to as Redwall Dam.
