= Wilderness Travel Course =

WTC logo

The class is a 10-week introduction to all-around outdoor proficiency, gives participants a taste of backpacking, equipment, snow travel, field navigation, wilderness ethics, basic rock climbing, mountaineering medicine, winter camping, general safety and rescue techniques.
