= Phillip S. Berry =

American lawyer

Phillip S. Berry (1937–2013) was an American lawyer and environmentalist who was the national President of the Sierra Club.

== Biography ==
Born January 30, 1937, in Berkeley, California, he graduated from Berkeley High (1954), Stanford University (1958) and Stanford Law (1961). He began his law career with his father Samuel Berry's firm, before they formed the Law Offices of Berry & Berry in Oakland, California. He died September 22, 2013, in Lafayette, CA.

== Sierra Club ==
In addition to becoming President of the Sierra Club, he had been National Board Member, Co-founder of Sierra Club Legal Defense later Earth Justice, and a John Muir Award Winner. He served as the Sierra Club's National President twice, first from 1969-1971, then later from 1991-1992. He served on the Sierra Club's National Board for 30 years. In 1971, he co-founded Sierra Club Legal Defense later Earth Justice along with Fred Fisher and Don Harris. He was awarded the Sierra Club John Muir Award, its highest honor, in 1978.
