= Independence Creek (Sierra County, California) =

Tributary in California

- Location of mouth

Location
- Country: United States
- State: California
- Region: Nevada and Sierra Counties

Physical characteristics
- Source: Southern flank Mount Lola in the eastern Sierra Nevada
  - location: 12 mi (19 km) northwest of Truckee, California
  - coordinates: 39°25′35″N 120°21′49″W
  - elevation: 7,983 ft (2,433 m)
- Mouth: Confluence with the Little Truckee River
  - coordinates: 39°30′08″N 120°15′39″W
  - elevation: 6,237 ft (1,901 m)
- Length: 11.2 mi (18.0 km)

Independence Creek is a 11.2-mile-long (18.0 km) northeast-flowing creek that is tributary to the Little Truckee River, north of Lake Tahoe. It drains the Independence Basin on the eastern slope of the Sierra Nevada, which includes Independence Lake, ultimately flowing through Sierra County to the Little Truckee River in Nevada County, thence to the Truckee River and ultimately, Pyramid Lake.

== History ==
Independence Creek shares the name of Independence Lake, which was named on Independence Day of 1852 or 1853 by the actress Lola Montez, who lived in nearby Grass Valley and for whom Mount Lola is named, although Augustus Moore claims to have named the lake on July 4, 1862.

== Watershed and Course ==
Independence Creek flows 3.3 miles (5.3 km) from the south flank of Mount Lola to Independence Lake, 2.4 miles (3.9 km) across the lake, then from the Independence Lake Dam another 5.5 miles (8.9 km) to the confluence with the Little Truckee River. The Independence Basin runs from southwest to northeast between Mount Lola on the north and Carpenter Ridge to the south. Upper Independence Creek, despite being in the rain shadow of the Sierra Crest is perennial even in drought years springs seeping from the Tertiary volcanic deposits that ring the basin as well as snowmelt from the steep north slopes of Carpenter Peak, which retain snow cover long after the rest of the basin has melted out.

== Ecology ==
Independence Creek and Lake, and Cascade Lake are the only two lakes in the Truckee River watershed with persistent native populations of Lahontan cutthroat trout (Oncorhynchus clarkii henshawi), a threatened species under the Endangered Species Act. This Lahontan cutthroat trout population has been precarious for more than 50 years, with spawning runs from Independence Lake into upper Independence Creek consisting of only 30–150 fish. Partial removal of introduced brook trout (Salvelinus fontinalis) by electrofishing modestly improved Lahontan cutthroat trout numbers underscoring the need for complete removal of this non-native predator fish.

== See also ==
- Little Truckee River
- Independence Lake
- Truckee River
