= Boca Dam =

Dam in California, United States

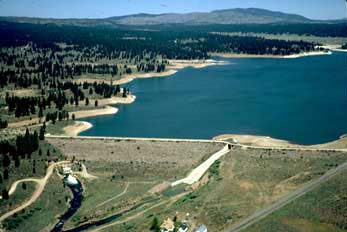
- Interactive map of Boca Dam
- Location: Tahoe National Forest; Nevada County, California
- Construction began: 1937; 89 years ago
- Opening date: 1939; 87 years ago
- Operator: Bureau of Reclamation

Dam and spillways
- Impounds: Little Truckee River
- Height: 93 ft (28 m)
- Length: 1,629 ft (497 m)

Reservoir
- Creates: Boca Reservoir
- Total capacity: 41,110 acre⋅ft (50,710,000 m^{3})
- Catchment area: 172 sq mi (450 km^{2})
- Surface area: 977 acres (3.95 km^{2})
- Boca Dam
- U.S. National Register of Historic Places
- Location within California Location within the United States
- Location: South end of Boca Reservoir, Nevada County, California, United States
- Coordinates: 39°23′26″N 120°05′40″W
- Built: 1937-1939
- NRHP reference No.: 81000712
- Added to NRHP: 1981

Boca Dam (National ID No. CA10135) is an earthfill dam and a part of the Truckee Storage Project that encompasses Nevada County, California and Washoe County, Nevada in the United States. Open year-round, it is located at the southern end of Boca Reservoir, 1 mi (2 km) north of Interstate 80, 0.3 mi (480 m) above the confluence of the Little Truckee River and the Truckee River, and 6 mi (9.7 km) northeast of Truckee, California. Reno, Nevada lies 27 mi (43 km) to the east.

Boca Dam's area of significance includes agriculture, conservation, and engineering. It is administered by the U.S. Department of the Interior, Bureau of Reclamation, and operated by the Washoe County Water Conservation District. The technical point of contact is the United States District Court Water Master's Office in Reno. The dam's major period of significance was 1925 through 1949.

== Dimensions ==
Boca Dam bridge
- Coordinates: 39°23′28″N 120°05′38″W
- Carries: Boca Dam Reservoir Road

Characteristics
- Width: 2 lanes

Location
- Interactive map of Boca Dam bridge

- Crest elevation: 5,615 ft (1,711 m)
- Structural height: 93 ft (28 m)
- Crest length: 1,629 ft (497 m)
- Top of joint use: 5,605 ft (1,708 m)
- Top of active conservation: 5,596.37 ft (1,706 m)
- Top of inactive conservation: N/A
- Spillway crest: 5,589 ft (1,704 m)
- Top of dead storage: 5,521 ft (1,683 m)
- Streambed at dam axis: 5,512 ft (1,680 m)

== Landmark ==
The dam is registered in the National Register of Historic Places. Its commemorative plaque states:

Boca Dam 1937 - 1940

United States Department of the Interior
Harold L. Ickes...Secretary

Bureau of Reclamation
John C. Page...Commissioner
R. F. Walter...Chief Engineer
L. J. Foster and C. S. Hale Construction Engineers

Height..............116 Feet
Length..............1629 Feet
Storage Capacity....40,901 Acre-Feet
Contractor..........George W. Condon Co.

== See also ==
- List of dams and reservoirs in California
