= Boca, California =

Boca
- Former settlement
- Location in California
- Coordinates: 39°23′10″N 120°05′39″W
- Country: United States
- State: California
- County: Nevada County
- Elevation: 5,528 ft (1,685 m)
- Time zone: UTC-8 (Pacific (PST))
  - Summer (DST): UTC-7 (PDT)

Boca (Spanish for "Mouth") is a former settlement in Nevada County, California. Situated at an elevation of 5,528 ft (1,685 m) above sea level, Boca is located on the Southern Pacific Railroad, 6.5 miles (10.5 km) northeast of Truckee at exit 194 from Interstate 80 onto Hirschdale Road.

== History ==
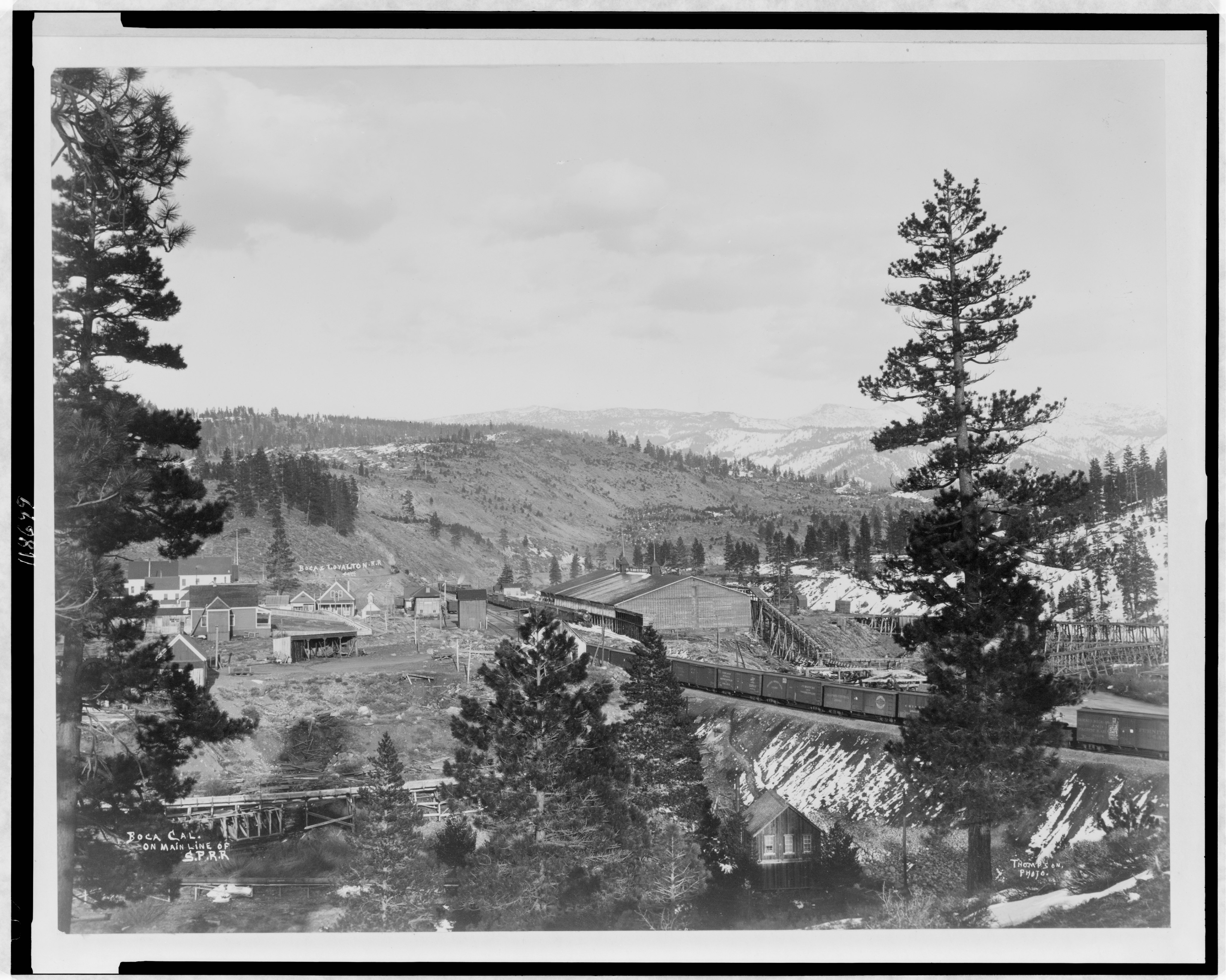
Landscape of Boca in 1906

Boca was named by Judge Edwin Bryant Crocker of the Central Pacific Railroad in 1868 because of its location at the mouth of the Little Truckee River. In Spanish, Boca translates to "mouth" and "river mouth". Crocker’s younger brother, Charles, was one of the four who oversaw the Central Pacific Railroad's construction and operation. Boca's location at the mouth of the river and along the route of the transcontinental railroad helped turn what was a small construction camp into a settlement. Because of its extremely cold winters and abundance of trees, investors developed saw mills, ice cutting companies, and eventually a brewery in 1876. The cold climate of Boca made it a perfect location for ice companies, as well a place to brew California’s first lager. It had a post office during the period of 1872 through 1945.

=== Ice and milling companies ===
The first business established in the area was the Boca Mill and Ice Company in 1868. By 1886, the industry expanded upstream to Polaris. In 1881, many of the ice companies merged, creating the Union Ice Company, which incorporated in 1891. A dam was eventually constructed creating a 180-acre reservoir used by the Union Ice Company to store logs in the summer and as a harvesting ground for ice during the winter. Once cut, the ice was transported downstream to one of the company's six ice houses. The amount of ice being stored in their ice-houses is said to have been enough to supply the entire state of California for 12 years. Reaching its prime in 1872, Boca was producing so much lumber and ice for the rest of the country that it had its own railway to and from the mill. The invention of man-made ice and refrigeration eventually replaced the need to cut natural ice and in the mid 1920s the ice company ended operations in Boca. With the ice companies gone, the mills and brewery were the only big business left in Boca. The brewery burned to the ground in 1893, and was never rebuilt, leaving only the milling operations, which ended at the same time because of the diminished supply of trees. Finally, in 1904, the hotel burned to the ground and what was left of the town was then demolished to make way for the Boca reservoir. Only a few cement foundations and cemetery are still left of what was the town of Boca.

=== Boca Brewing Company ===
The Boca Brewing company, founded in 1875, produced California’s first lager. Lagers require refrigeration and very cold temperatures during the fermentation process, which is why most of California’s breweries choose to produce porters and ales. Boca's location was a perfect environment for brewing lager because of the natural springs, an unlimited supply of ice for refrigeration, cold winters, and access to the Central Pacific Railroad. Famed for using natural spring water in its lager, the Boca Brewing Company’s product was celebrated at the World’s Fair in Paris in 1883. The company produced 25 to 30 thousand barrels of the beer per year. The brewery employed as many as 80 people, which contributed to a population of close to 300 for Boca. The brewery burned to the ground in a fire in 1893, and was never rebuilt.

==== Anchor Steam ====
In February 2012, Anchor Brewing in San Francisco introduced its Zymaster No. 1 Lager in honor of the Boca Brewing Company. An attempt to recreate Boca's original California lager, the single-hop beer uses two-row barley and mountain water, and follows a traditional beer recipe which produces a maltier, hoppier, and stronger drink than most lagers on sale.

== Climate ==
Boca is located at an elevation approximately 5,575 feet (1,699 m) and is famous for having very cold winters and warm summers. The area sees a large amount of snow being located along the Sierra Nevada mountain range. Boca has a fairly typical climate for its region, a humid continental climate (Köppen Dsb), with dry summers that feature hot days and cold nights, and cold, snowy winters. Snowfall is less heavy than Truckee and Tahoe City due to the rain shadow effect of the Sierra Nevada, but depths can still reach to 90 inches (2.29 m), and in recent times 70 inches (1.78 m) of snow was on the ground at the end of February 1993.

On January 20, 1937, the temperature at Boca fell to −45 °F (−42.8 °C), the lowest temperature ever recorded in California, though on average only a dozen nights will fall below 0 °F (−17.8 °C) and 266 days exceed 50 °F (10 °C). Nightly frosts are common even in summer, and only 98.3 nights per year fail to fall below 32 °F (0 °C).

Climate data for Boca, California, 1991–2020 normals, extremes since 1936–present
| Month | Jan | Feb | Mar | Apr | May | Jun | Jul | Aug | Sep | Oct | Nov | Dec | Year |
|---|---|---|---|---|---|---|---|---|---|---|---|---|---|
| Record high °F (°C) | 68 (20) | 74 (23) | 85 (29) | 85 (29) | 92 (33) | 98 (37) | 103 (39) | 100 (38) | 103 (39) | 91 (33) | 79 (26) | 70 (21) | 103 (39) |
| Mean maximum °F (°C) | 56.5 (13.6) | 60.6 (15.9) | 67.4 (19.7) | 75.2 (24.0) | 82.3 (27.9) | 89.4 (31.9) | 95.0 (35.0) | 93.6 (34.2) | 90.0 (32.2) | 82.7 (28.2) | 71.3 (21.8) | 57.8 (14.3) | 96.0 (35.6) |
| Mean daily maximum °F (°C) | 43.6 (6.4) | 46.2 (7.9) | 51.7 (10.9) | 57.9 (14.4) | 66.5 (19.2) | 76.5 (24.7) | 85.8 (29.9) | 85.1 (29.5) | 78.7 (25.9) | 67.2 (19.6) | 53.7 (12.1) | 42.9 (6.1) | 63.0 (17.2) |
| Daily mean °F (°C) | 28.5 (−1.9) | 30.8 (−0.7) | 36.2 (2.3) | 41.4 (5.2) | 48.9 (9.4) | 55.8 (13.2) | 62.6 (17.0) | 61.0 (16.1) | 55.0 (12.8) | 46.0 (7.8) | 36.7 (2.6) | 29.0 (−1.7) | 44.3 (6.8) |
| Mean daily minimum °F (°C) | 13.3 (−10.4) | 15.4 (−9.2) | 20.7 (−6.3) | 25.0 (−3.9) | 31.3 (−0.4) | 35.0 (1.7) | 39.4 (4.1) | 36.8 (2.7) | 31.2 (−0.4) | 24.8 (−4.0) | 19.8 (−6.8) | 15.0 (−9.4) | 25.6 (−3.5) |
| Mean minimum °F (°C) | −6.0 (−21.1) | −3.0 (−19.4) | 5.4 (−14.8) | 14.0 (−10.0) | 20.3 (−6.5) | 24.6 (−4.1) | 29.9 (−1.2) | 27.2 (−2.7) | 21.9 (−5.6) | 13.8 (−10.1) | 5.0 (−15.0) | −3.0 (−19.4) | −10.5 (−23.6) |
| Record low °F (°C) | −45 (−43) | −43 (−42) | −24 (−31) | −4 (−20) | 10 (−12) | 16 (−9) | 21 (−6) | 18 (−8) | 10 (−12) | 2 (−17) | −9 (−23) | −31 (−35) | −45 (−43) |
| Average precipitation inches (mm) | 3.91 (99) | 3.61 (92) | 2.93 (74) | 1.47 (37) | 1.35 (34) | 0.57 (14) | 0.48 (12) | 0.36 (9.1) | 0.48 (12) | 1.26 (32) | 2.00 (51) | 4.12 (105) | 22.54 (571.1) |
| Average snowfall inches (cm) | 21.3 (54) | 20.1 (51) | 18.1 (46) | 6.3 (16) | 1.2 (3.0) | 0.1 (0.25) | 0.0 (0.0) | 0.0 (0.0) | 0.1 (0.25) | 0.7 (1.8) | 8.0 (20) | 22.5 (57) | 98.4 (249.3) |
| Average extreme snow depth inches (cm) | 17.3 (44) | 18.4 (47) | 17.1 (43) | 4.2 (11) | 0.7 (1.8) | 0.0 (0.0) | 0.0 (0.0) | 0.0 (0.0) | 0.1 (0.25) | 0.9 (2.3) | 4.6 (12) | 14.1 (36) | 29.6 (75) |
| Average precipitation days (≥ 0.01 in) | 8.8 | 8.1 | 9.4 | 6.4 | 6.9 | 3.4 | 2.4 | 2.5 | 2.2 | 4.1 | 6.0 | 9.7 | 69.9 |
| Average snowy days (≥ 0.1 in) | 5.2 | 5.2 | 5.3 | 2.5 | 0.7 | 0.1 | 0.0 | 0.0 | 0.1 | 0.4 | 2.4 | 5.6 | 27.5 |
Source 1: NOAA
Source 2: National Weather Service
