= Martis Creek =

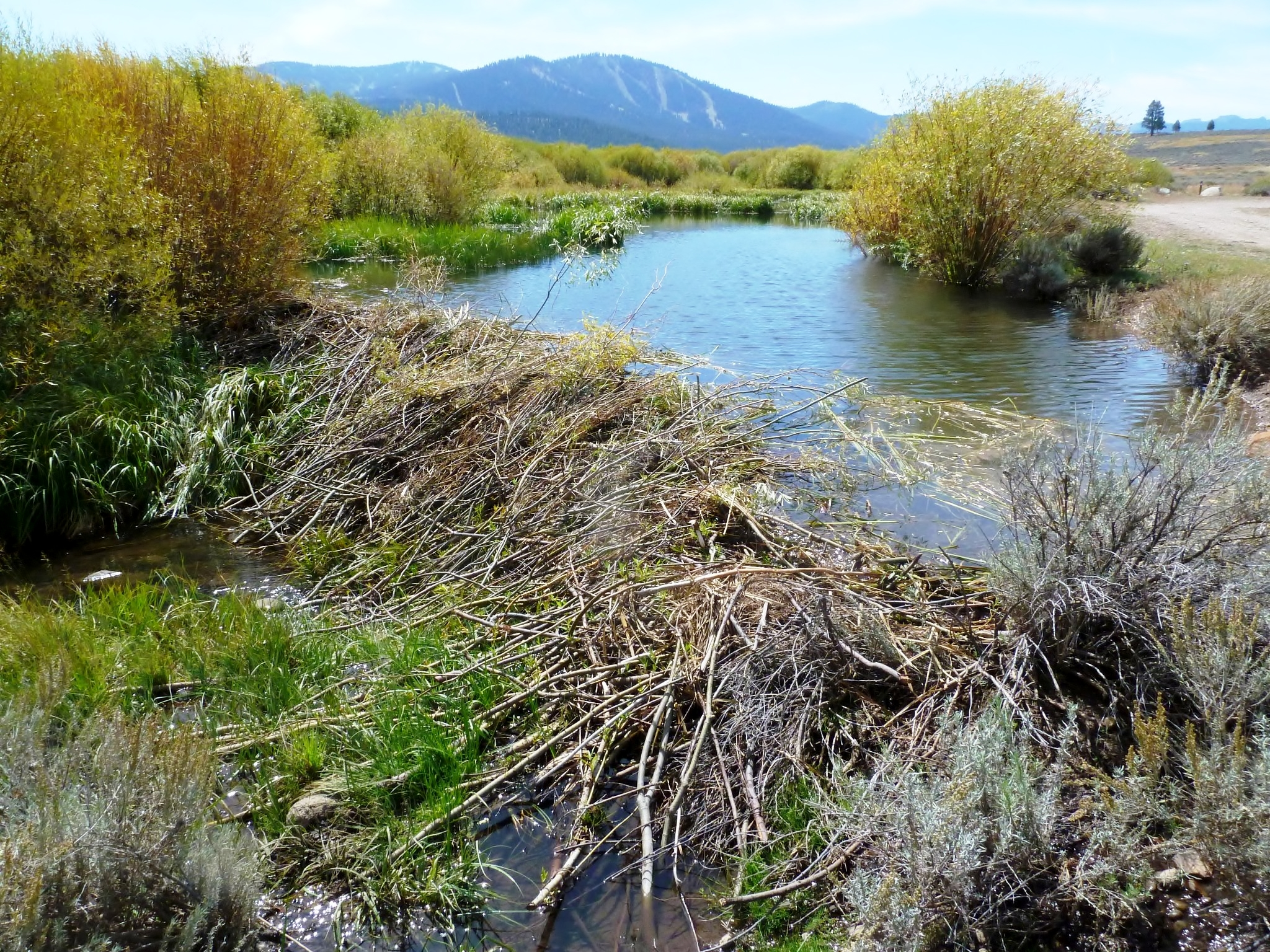
- Beaver dam upstream of Martis Reservoir creates additional trout habitat. Northstar at Tahoe in background.

- Location of the mouth of Martis Creek in California

Location
- Country: United States
- State: California
- Region: Placer County & Nevada County
- City: Truckee, California

Physical characteristics
- Source: Sawtooth Ridge, west of the peak of Mount Pluto
  - coordinates: 39°14′33″N 120°09′21″W
  - elevation: 7,305 ft (2,227 m)
- Mouth: Confluence with the Truckee River
  - coordinates: 39°21′00″N 120°07′06″W
  - elevation: 5,666 ft (1,727 m)

Basin features
- Tributaries
  - right: West Fork Martis Creek, Middle Fork Martis Creek, East Fork Martis Creek, Dry Lake Creek

Martis Creek is a northward-flowing stream originating on Sawtooth Ridge, west of the peak of Mount Pluto in Placer County, California, United States. After crossing into Nevada County, California, it is a tributary to the Truckee River on the eastern side of Truckee.

== History ==
An archaic Native American people known as the Martis people lived in the Martis Creek watershed from 2000 BCE to 500 CE. William Brewer of the California Geological Survey referred to the area by its Washoe name "Timilick Valley". It is supposed that the creek, valley and peak were all named after a rancher named "Martis".

== Watershed ==
The Martis Creek watershed is east of the Sierra Nevada crest and drains 42.7 square miles (111 km^{2}). It has four perennial tributaries, in order (heading downstream): West Fork Martis Creek, Middle Fork Martis Creek, East Fork Martis Creek, and Dry Lake Creek. The tributaries join Martis Creek above Martis Creek Reservoir, except for Dry Lake Creek.

The United States Army Corps of Engineers (USACE) has identified significant problems with Martis Dam, including significant seepage and seismic dangers which they are currently studying. Shortly after its construction in 1972, the seepage was discovered and the water behind the dam has been maintained at a minimal level since.

== Ecology ==
The Northstar Habitat Management Plan is being developed to enhance the forests, aquatic, riparian, and meadow habitats around Northstar at Tahoe, recognizing that these environments provide habitat for a range of sensitive species, including northern goshawk (Accipiter gentilis), California spotted owl (Strix occidentalis occidentalis), pileated woodpecker (Dryocopus pileatus), American marten (Martes americana), mule deer, willow flycatcher (Empidonax traillii), mountain yellow-legged frog (Rana muscosa), and mountain beaver (Aplodontia rufa).

North American beaver (Castor canadensis) have re-colonized Martis Creek. The presence of beaver dams has been shown to either increase the number of fish, their size, or both, in a study of brook, rainbow and brown trout in Sagehen Creek, which flows into the Little Truckee River. Recently novel physical evidence demonstrated that beaver were native to the Sierra until at least the mid-nineteenth century, via radiocarbon dating of buried beaver dam wood uncovered by deep channel incision in two locations in Red Clover Creek, a Feather River tributary that is also east of the Sierra Nevada crest. Beaver ponds are associated with high cutthroat trout (Oncorhynchus clarki) populations in a study of successful translocations into streams in Colorado and New Mexico because they provide deep pond refugia for adult trout in small headwater streams.

Prior to the arrival of European inhabitants and fish species declines probably related to logging and overgrazing, Martis Creek was an important year-round fishery for the Washoe people. Fishery resources included Lahontan cutthroat trout (Oncorhynchus clarki henshawi) (LCT) and a variety of smaller species, such as sucker and chub. In June 1978 the California Department of Fish and Game stocked LCT in Martis Creek Reservoir, after reducing non-native resident trout using piscicides. This stocking attempt was unsuccessful.

== See also ==
- Truckee River
- Beaver in the Sierra Nevada
