= Cascade Lake (California) =

Lake in El Dorado County, California

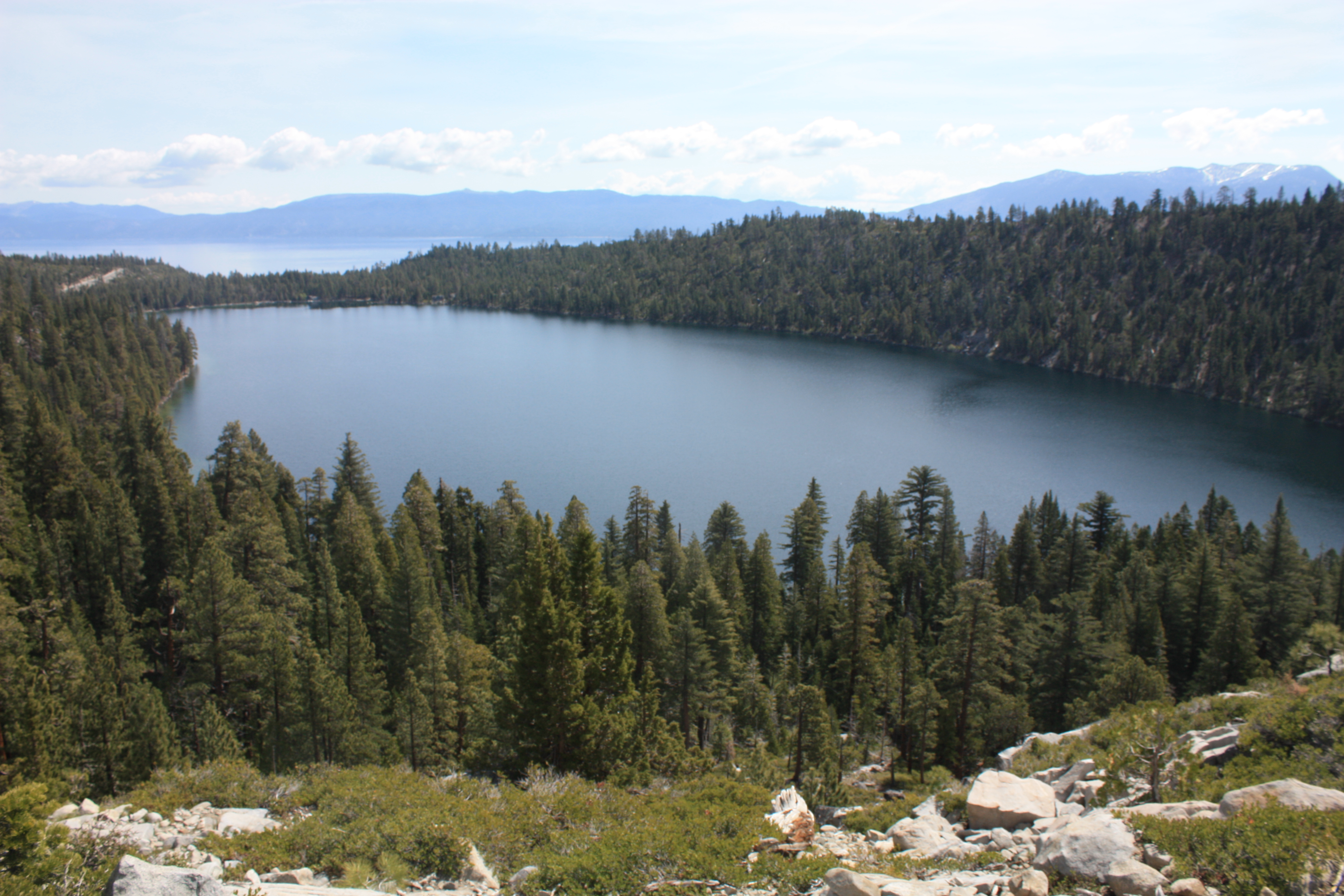
- Cascade Lake from the top of Cascade Falls

- Location within California Location within the United States
- Location: El Dorado County, California
- Coordinates: 38°56′25″N 120°05′31″W
- Type: Glacial lake
- Max. length: 1 mile (1.6 km)
- Max. width: 0.5 miles (0.80 km)
- Max. depth: 170 feet (52 m)

Cascade Lake is a glacial lake located in El Dorado County, California approximately 1 kilometre (0.62 mi) from Lake Tahoe. Cascade Lake is the second largest tributary lake feeding into Lake Tahoe. Its depth is 170 feet (52 m), 1 mile (1.6 km) long and 0.5 miles (0.80 km) wide. The lake is also within three to four miles from its neighboring lake, Fallen Leaf Lake, and Emerald Bay.

== Natural history ==
=== Lake formation ===
Cascade Lake was formed from a mountain glacier that carved out a basin and while it traveled to Lake Tahoe, the glacier deposited debris to form a lateral moraine that separates the two lakes.

=== Tributaries ===
Cascade Lake mainly obtains water from Cascade Creek that is sourced from several snow melt lakes within the Desolation Wilderness such as Snow Lake, Azure Lake, Kalmia Lake, and Tallac Lake. Outflow from Cascade Lake flows through Cascade Creek into Lake Tahoe.

== Human history ==
Before settlers established cabins within the area of Cascade Lake, the Washoe tribe utilized the environment of Cascade Lake. For many years, the Washoe tribe would make Cascade Lake their fishing and hunting grounds sending the men to hunt for food while the women would scavenge for nuts or material to weave baskets. In the 1800s, Cascade Lake became one of the battle grounds in the Paiute War between the Washoe and Paiute tribes. Ultimately, the Washoe became victorious which enabled them to retain their territory in Cascade Lake. In 1880, an Italian fisherman discovered the petrified remains of a female Native-American in the gravel at Cascade Lakes which would reveal this woman was a victim killed in the battle between the Washoe and Paiute tribe.

Around the 1880s, Cascade Lake would soon be property to Charles B. Brigham, an international surgeon who purchased the land. As Brigham expanded his area, he gained ownership to parts of the Emerald Bay's shoreline making him neighbors to Elias "Lucky" Baldwin.

== Present ==
There is a tradition in the Tahoe area that Cascade Lake is privately owned; however, the lake bed is in fact owned by the State of California (ref: California State Lands Commission), and thus the surface of the lake itself, and the shoreline up to the mean high tide line (under California law), is public property. Although the lake is public property, access to the lake is very limited. Most of the land around the lake is privately owned, by Brigham's present family, and public access is not allowed. Only a small part of the lake's western shoreline abuts public (National Forest) land, in USGS sections 28 and 33. There are no roads, nor publicly maintained access, to the lakeshore from this area.

The 0.7 miles (1.1 km) long "Cascade Falls Trail," built and maintained by the U.S. Forest Service, allows public access to the area above the 200 feet (61 m) waterfall that cascades into Cascade Lake from the large glacial valley above. The trail begins at nearby Bayview campground, runs along the steep mountainside above the lake, about 200 feet (61 m) above, and 250 yards (230 m) away from the lake's western shore, and ends at the falls. The trail offers an excellent view of the lake, and of Lake Tahoe.

There are no maintained trails beyond the Cascade Trail's terminus at the creek above the falls. The unmarked Desolation Wilderness boundary is a short distance beyond, and a permit for entry is required. Day hike permits can be obtained at the trailhead at Bayview campground. Overnight permits, subject to restrictions, may be obtained at the Forest Service's Lake Tahoe Basin Management Unit Headquarters in South Lake Tahoe, or reserved online. Venturing into the Wilderness, via the difficult terrain of the steeply-sided and remote upper canyon, should only be attempted by those with excellent backcountry skills.

== Ecology ==
Cascade Lake and Independence Lake are the only two lakes in the Truckee River watershed with persistent native populations of Lahontan cutthroat trout (Oncorhynchus clarkii henshawi), a threatened species under the Endangered Species Act. Cascade Lake's aquatic fauna resembles the historic fauna of Lake Tahoe as there are no non-native Mysis shrimp or Mackinaw lake trout (Salvelinus namaycush), however non-native brown trout (Salmo trutta) and rainbow trout (Oncorhynchus mykiss) have ascended Cascade Creek to invade Cascade Lake. Brown trout and rainbow trout interfere with the threatened native Lahontan cutthroat trout via competition for food, and hybridization, respectively.
