= Independence Lake (California) =

Lake in the state of California, United States

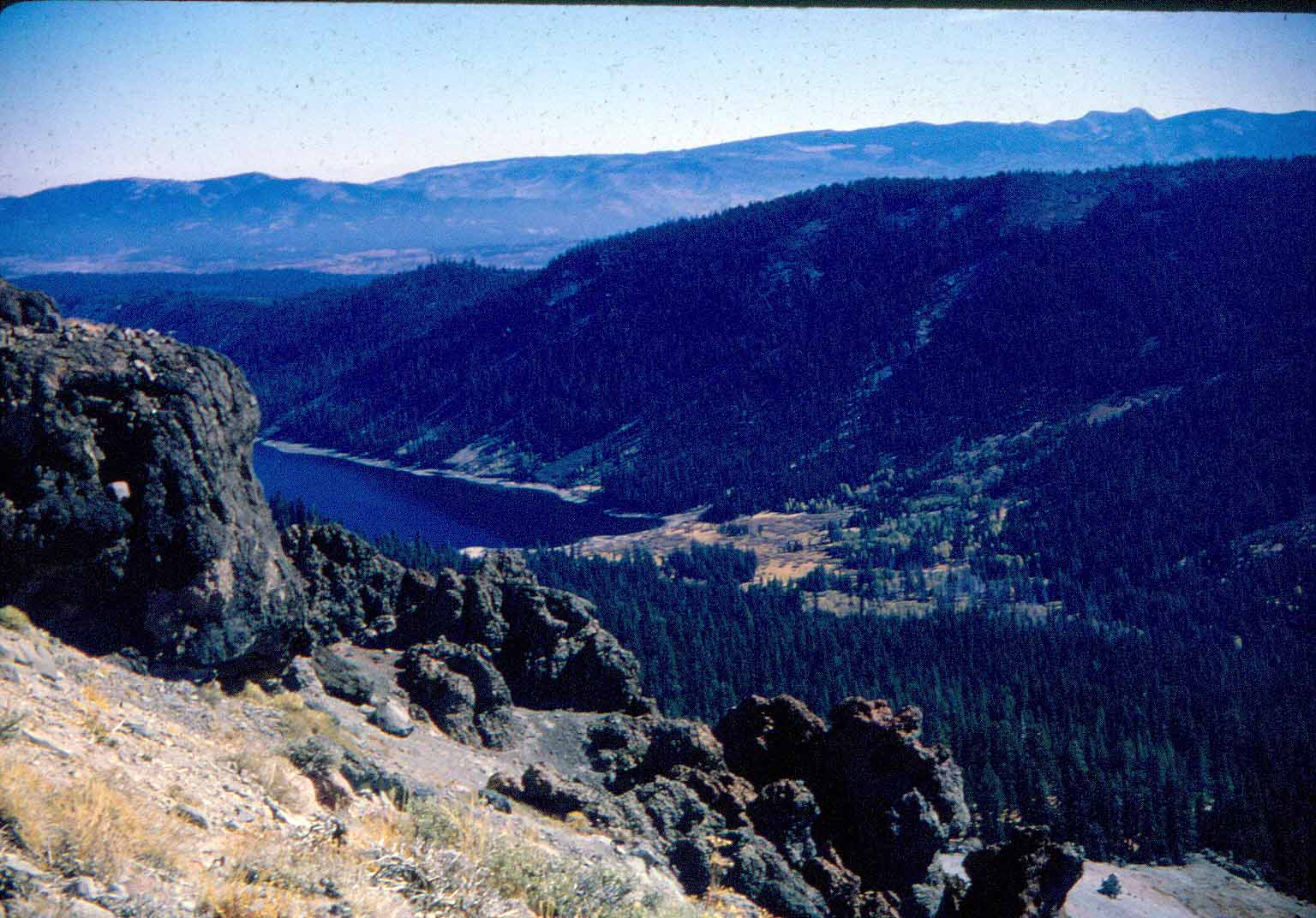
- The upper end of Independence Lake, as seen from the south slope of Mount Lola

- Location within California
- Coordinates: 39°26′33″N 120°18′36″W
- Part of: Little Truckee River watershed, Truckee River, Great Basin
- Max. length: 2.4 miles (3.9 km)
- Max. width: 0.5 miles (0.8 km)
- Surface area: 700 acres (280 ha)
- Max. depth: 145 feet (44 m)
- Shore length^{1}: 5.8 miles (9.3 km)
- Surface elevation: 6,949 feet (2,118 m)
- ^{1} Shore length is not a well-defined measure.

Independence Lake is a natural glacial lake in the Sierra Nevada of California. At an elevation of 6,949 feet (2,118 m) in the upper reaches of the Truckee River basin, it has been less affected by development than most lakes in the area. The Nature Conservancy owns a 2,325 acres (9.41 km^{2}) parcel of land around it, which it manages privately as the Independence Lake Preserve for the purposes of conservation and low-impact recreation.

== Geography ==
Independence Lake is in a narrow glacial valley immediately to the east of the Sierra crest. Mount Lola, the area's highest peak, rises from the valley's northern ridge about a mile west of the lake's west end. Carpenter Ridge rises steeply from the lake's south shore and continues farther to the southwest, where it reaches its highest point. Upper Independence Creek flows into the lake on its west side through a lush subalpine meadow. The lake's outlet on its east end forms Independence Creek, a tributary of the Little Truckee River and thence the Truckee River. The lake is 2.4 miles (3.9 km) long and half a mile (0.8 km) wide.

The nearest major town is Truckee, 20 miles (32 km) to the south by road. The much smaller town of Sierraville is 14 miles (23 km) to the north by road.

== Geology ==
Independence Lake lies in a deep glacial valley that was carved by a former glacier on Mount Lola's eastern slope.

== Ecology ==
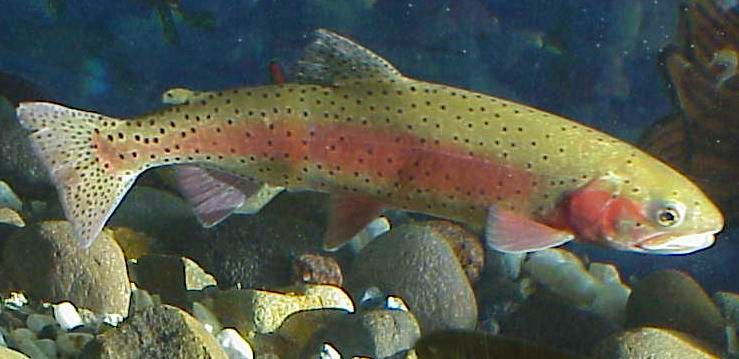
Independence Lake is a crucial habitat for the threatened Lahontan cutthroat trout.

Independence Lake is home to one of only two remaining wild, self-sustaining populations of the Lahontan cutthroat trout (Oncorhynchus clarkii henshawi), listed as a threatened species under the Endangered Species Act. It has been extirpated from almost the entirety of its historic range. Other fish species include the brook trout (Salvelinus fontinalis), brown trout (Salmo trutta), kokanee salmon (Oncorhynchus nerka), and mountain whitefish (Prosopium williamsoni).

Independence Lake is unique among the lakes of the eastern slope of the Sierra Nevada in that it still retains all its native fish species. Its dam keeps out invasive species that might otherwise enter from downstream, protecting its native populations.

A "relatively pristine" ecosystem surrounds the lake, comprising a number of vegetation types characteristic of the Sierra Nevada upper montane forest. The surrounding forests are dominated by conifers such as the white fir and Jeffrey pine, joined by red fir in the higher elevations. Scattered stands of aspen dot the forest, but are threatened by encroachment from conifers, whose thick foliage impedes on the wide sun exposure the aspens need to thrive. It is thought that the past century of fire suppression has altered these forests' equilibriums, allowing the white fir to proliferate at the expense of the aspen and Jeffrey pine.

== History ==
Independence Lake sits within the traditional territory of the Washoe people, who believed it to be bottomless. They have used it for approximately 9,000 years.

In the mid-19th century, the lake became of interest to Europeans for the first time. Sources disagree on who named it, and when, but agree it was named on Independence Day. It is most commonly believed that Lola Montez named it on a trip there in 1853. Montez, a former mistress of King Ludwig of Bavaria, was forced into exile by the revolutions of 1848 in Europe. She began traveling the world, and became well-known as an actress, dancer and entertainer. Upon arrival in California in early 1853, she made a home in the town of Grass Valley, where she became a local personality. Mount Lola, a mile west of the lake, is named for her. Augustus Moore, who built an early stage station at the lake, is the other claimant; he said that he named the lake in 1862.

In 1879, the lake was dammed for the first time.

A wildfire in 1945 burned much of the forest around the lake. After subsequent logging, a new dam was built, increasing the lake's water capacity. In 1947, Sierra Pacific Power Company (now a subsidiary of NV Energy) bought the land around it and closed the area to most public access.

In the 1970s, Independence Lake became the latest focus of Disney's long-held aspirations of building a family-oriented ski resort and mountain village in the Sierra Nevada. For years they had worked on a proposal to develop the Mineral King valley in the southern Sierra, but it faced increasingly long odds due to legal issues and environmentalist opposition. In 1971 the Forest Service recommended Independence Lake as a potentially promising alternative location for such a development. In 1974, Disney partnered with Sierra Pacific to plan and develop a resort at Independence Lake, and in 1975 they began working with the Forest Service on a land-swap plan. The project received a mixed reception from local residents. At a public meeting where Disney was to present its plans, protesters picketed the entrance with signs bearing slogans such as "Don't Mickey Mouse Sierra County". Later that year, with local opposition growing, the county's Conservation Club, which had previously taken a neutral stance on the project, appealed to the Sierra Club for assistance. Opponents of the project cited environmental concerns and fears that the remote rural area's limited facilities would be overwhelmed by the sudden population boom they anticipated. They also cited the impact such a population increase would have on the area's rural, small-town character. In 1978, citizens of Nevada County, Placer County and Sierra County formed a joint environmental organization to monitor the project. Later in 1978, amidst mounting opposition from local residents and environmental groups, Disney withdrew its applications and abandoned its aspirations.

The United States Congress passed a bill in 2008 directing the Secretary of the Interior to allocate $9 million for "acquisition of the land surrounding Independence Lake" and "protection of the native fishery and water quality of Independence Lake as determined by [a nonprofit conservation organization acting in consultation with the Truckee Meadows Water Authority]". In April 2010, The Nature Conservancy purchased the 2,325 acres (941 ha) property from Sierra Pacific to establish the Independence Lake Preserve.

== Conservation and management ==
The Nature Conservancy permits year-round, walk-in day access to the lake and its surrounding preserve. However, the road to the lake is not plowed, and due to the area's prodigious winter snowfall it is impassable for much of the winter and spring.

To protect the lake from invasive species, all outside boats and watercraft are prohibited, even non-motorized watercraft such as kayaks and canoes. During the summer season, free kayaks, pontoon float tubes, and small motorboats are available to the public; the motorboats are available only in alternate weeks.

The Truckee Meadows Water Authority holds the rights to the lake's surface water, managing the uppermost 28 feet (8.5 m), controlled by the dam, as part of the Truckee River Project, which supplies municipal water to the Reno–Sparks area.

== Legends ==
Many visitors to the lake have claimed to see a ghost, wearing a plaid shirt, in the window of a long abandoned boarded-up lakefront resort building. Caretakers say they take the reports seriously due to the number of people who have reported such sightings. There are two common theories for the "ghost's" identity: In the 1940s, a photographer drowned in the lake; and in 1950, a pilot crashed in the steep valley. Neither body was found.
