= Polaris, California =

Unincorporated community in California, United States

Polaris
- Unincorporated community
- Location in California Polaris (the United States)
- Coordinates: 39°20′21″N 120°08′09″W
- Country: United States
- State: California
- County: Nevada County
- Elevation: 5,696 ft (1,736 m)

Polaris was a historic ice farming community located nearly 3 miles east of Truckee, approximately at the intersection of modern day Glenshire Drive and Quail Lane.

== History ==
The community was named after Polaris, the north star, either by the Central Pacific Railroad in 1867, or by the National Ice Company in 1901 in anticipation of the establishment of a post office.

Its 5,695 feet elevation meant that there was plenty of ice around during the winter. After the Transcontinental Railroad came through, entrepreneurs built a number of ice ponds, usually by damming or diverting the Truckee River, around railroad stops such as Winsted (later Polaris) and Boca. Ice harvesting began at Boca in 1868.

In 1886, a group of business people formed the Tahoe Ice Company at Winsted. They built a 75-foot dam which created an 80 acre pond used to make ice. They added infrastructure such as roads, stables and a large warehouse, 290' by 130', for the harvested ice. It was reported to be the most efficient ice harvesting operation on the Truckee River. In 1901, the much larger National Ice Company took over the Tahoe Ice Company and installed D. M. Dysart as manager. Dysart was considered to be the “Ice King of the Sierras," having been in the ice business over 20 years. He expanded National's operation at Polaris, and built a house there, affectionately known as the Pink Palace because of its pink asphalt shingles. When he died in 1905, he was capably replaced by Robert Koepke, who ran the operation into the 1920s.

Winter ice at Polaris regularly exceeded 12 inches of thickness and the harvest often ran 13–16,000 tons of ice. The ice, insulated with sawdust, was shipped by rail around the country for use in iceboxes and was used to pack around fruit being shipped to eastern markets. Several hundred men and many horses were employed for the ice harvest. The work was largely seasonal, lasting from around mid-November, when preparations for harvesting the ice began, to early February, when the harvest was largely complete. For a while, Polaris also served as a packing station in the summer, where ice was packed around fruit before being shipped east, but packing was soon consolidated at Truckee and later moved to Sparks, Nevada. Apart from homes and lodging for the seasonal workers, little has been reported about the town itself. It did have a blacksmith shop. There is no record of a store, saloon or hotel. It did not have a school; children went to school in Truckee. On November 1, 1901, Dysart applied to establish a post office to be located 250 feet from the south side of the railroad station. His application listed the population as 35 during the summer and 150 during the winter. Dysart was the first postmaster and Koepke became postmaster in 1913. Polaris was connected to Truckee by a telephone line operated by the Sunset Telephone Company.

By 1923, with the advent of ice making machines and refrigerated rail cars, the ice industry came to a sudden end. The post office closed that year. The area around Polaris became a center for recreation, including fishing, camping and ice skating. Little of the ice harvesting industry remains visible, except for the old ice pond.

== Climate ==
Climate data for Polaris, California (39.3392°N 120.1358°W), elevation 5,761 ft (1,756 m) 1991-2020 normals
Month	Jan	Feb	Mar	Apr	May	Jun	Jul	Aug	Sep	Oct	Nov	Dec	Year
Mean daily maximum °F (°C)	42.2 (5.7)	44.5 (6.9)	49.2 (9.6)	55.0 (12.8)	63.9 (17.7)	73.8 (23.2)	82.9 (28.3)	82.0 (27.8)	75.8 (24.3)	64.3 (17.9)	51.4 (10.8)	41.3 (5.2)	60.5 (15.9)
Daily mean °F (°C)	28.6 (−1.9)	30.6 (−0.8)	35.3 (1.8)	40.2 (4.6)	47.7 (8.7)	54.9 (12.7)	62.1 (16.7)	60.9 (16.1)	55.0 (12.8)	45.5 (7.5)	36.2 (2.3)	28.6 (−1.9)	43.8 (6.6)
Mean daily minimum °F (°C)	14.9 (−9.5)	16.7 (−8.5)	21.3 (−5.9)	25.4 (−3.7)	31.5 (−0.3)	36.0 (2.2)	41.3 (5.2)	39.8 (4.3)	34.1 (1.2)	26.7 (−2.9)	21.0 (−6.1)	16.0 (−8.9)	27.1 (−2.7)
Average precipitation inches (mm)	3.83 (97)	3.61 (92)	3.22 (82)	1.58 (40)	1.16 (29)	0.45 (11)	0.22 (5.6)	0.33 (8.4)	0.41 (10)	1.27 (32)	2.05 (52)	3.97 (101)	22.1 (560)
Source: PRISM
