= Donner Creek =

Stream in Nevada County, California, U.S.

Coordinates: 39°18′59″N 120°12′02″W

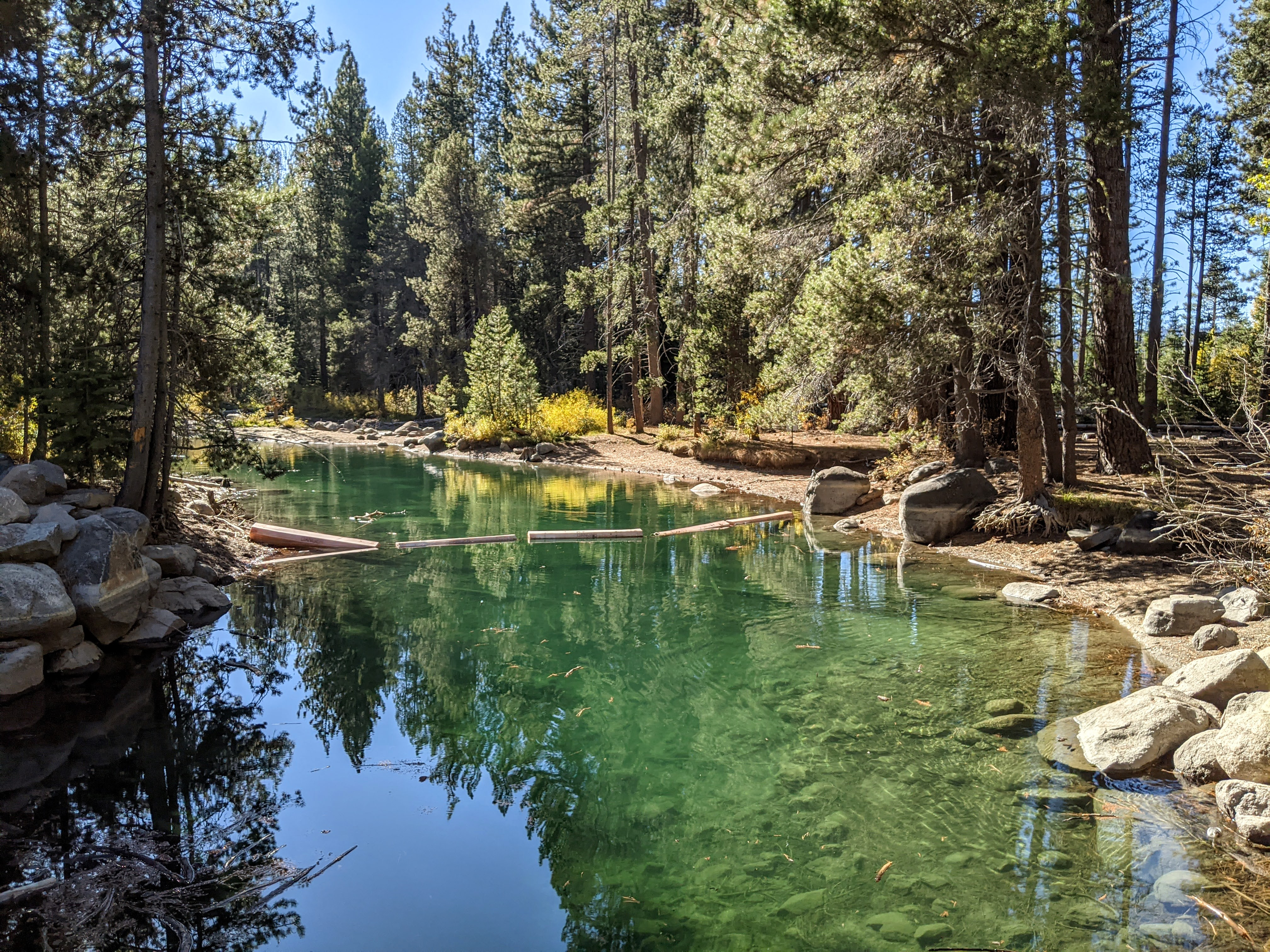
Donner Creek, looking upstream where it leaves Donner Lake

Donner Creek is a stream in Nevada County, California, that flows into and out of Donner Lake. It is a tributary to the Truckee River.

== Coldstream Canyon ==
A significant tributary to Donner Creek is Cold Creek, which drains Coldstream Canyon, a 12.5 square mile area south of Donner Lake, in and near Truckee.

== Course ==
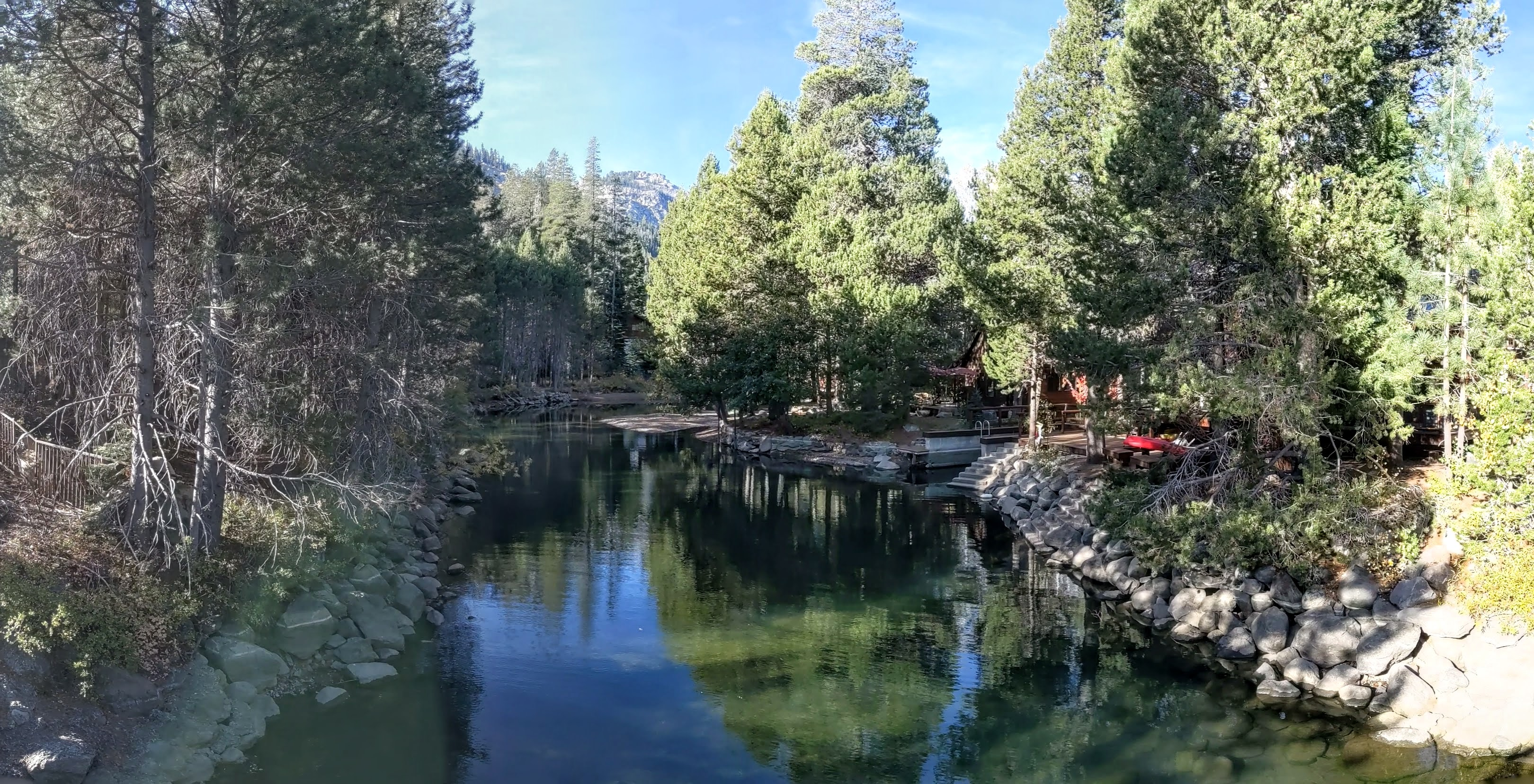
Just above Donner Lake

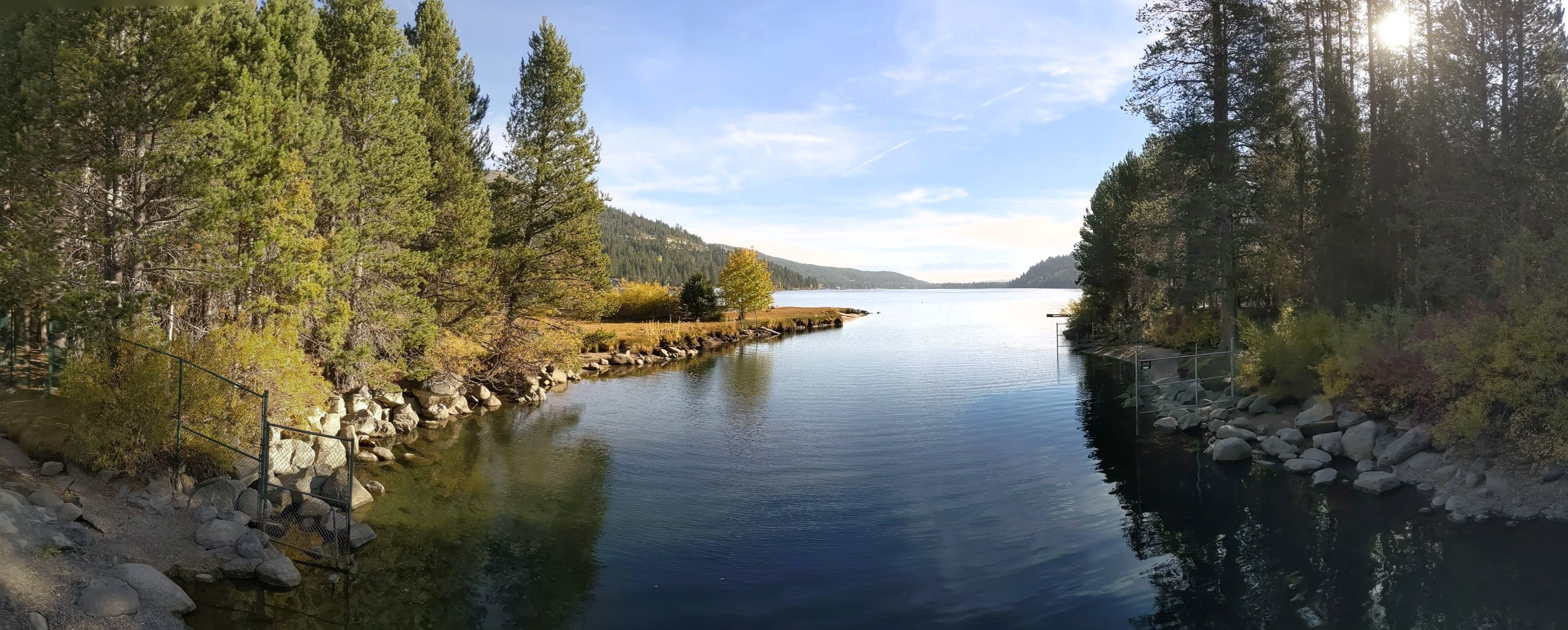
Entering Donner Lake

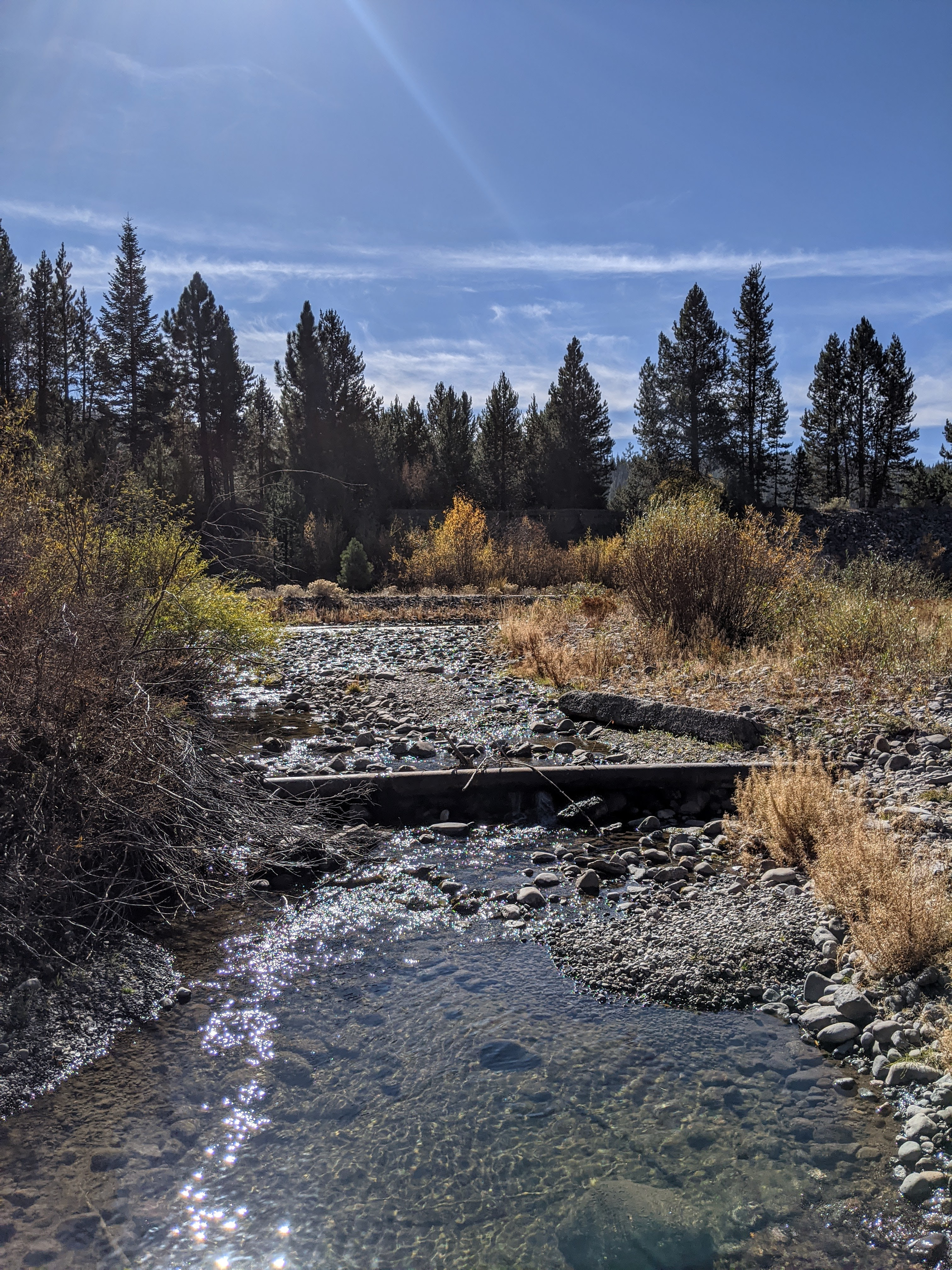
Cold Creek just above confluence, below Donner Lake
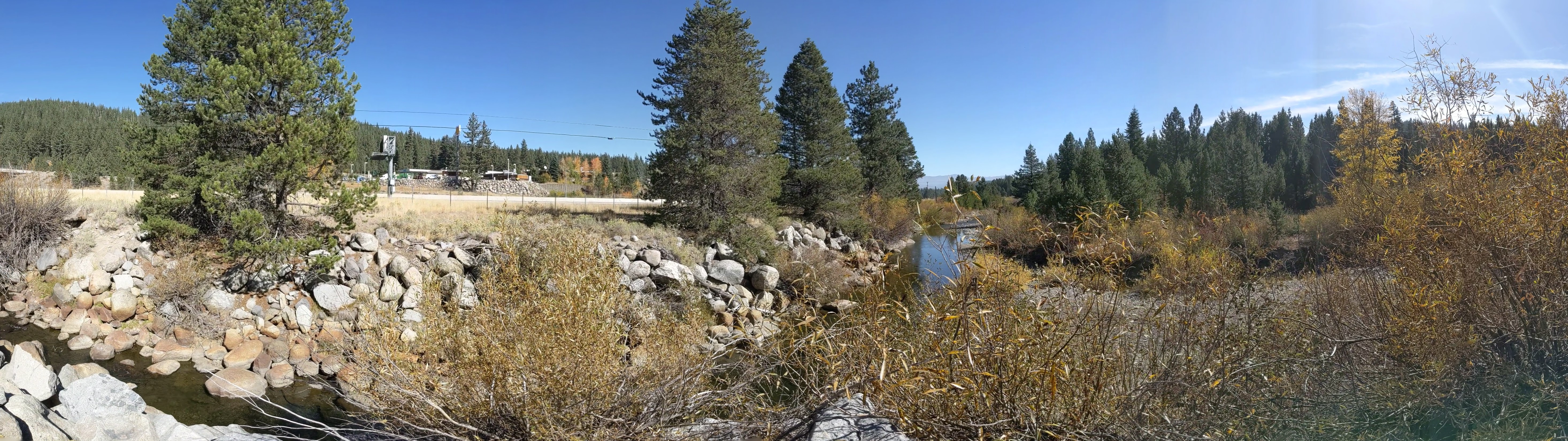
Confluence of Cold Creek (right) with Donner Creek (left)
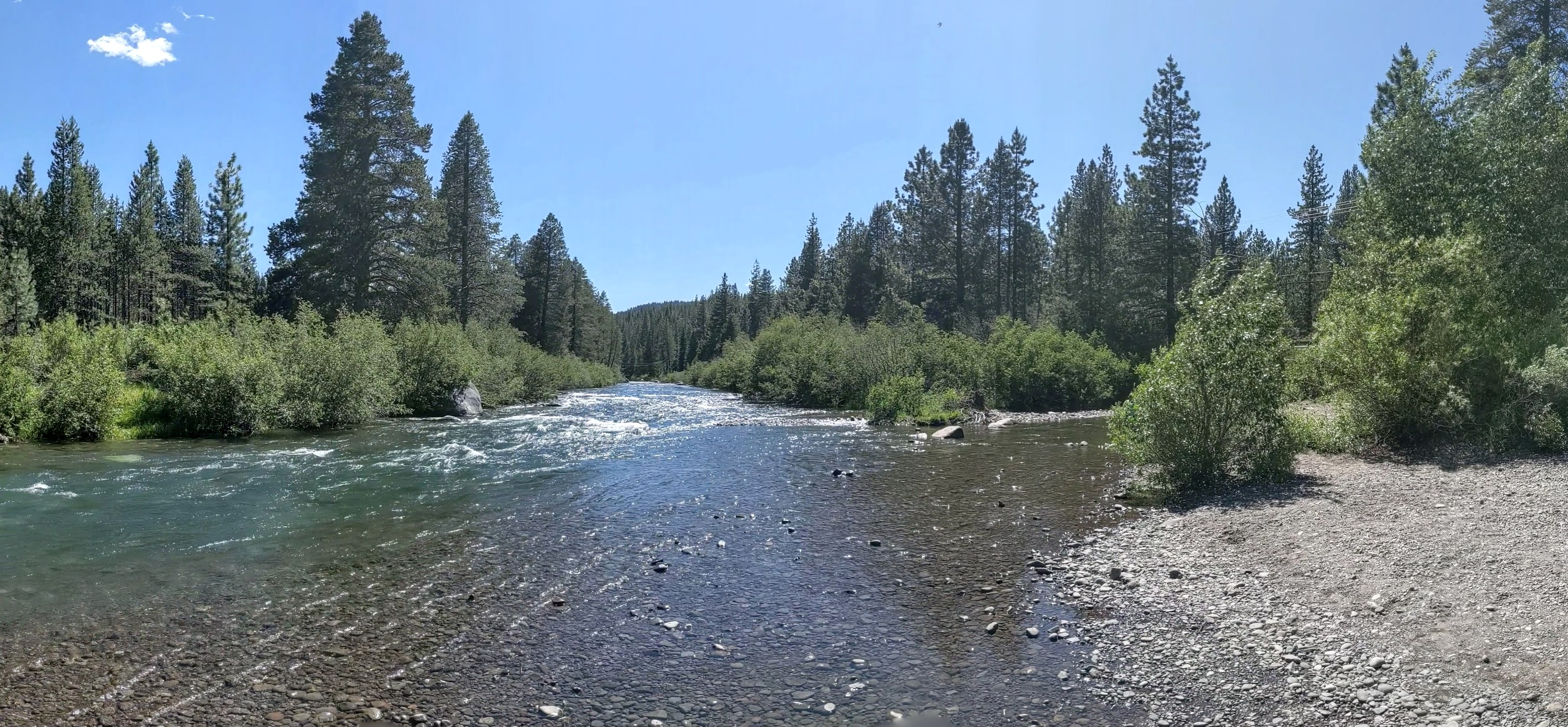
Confluence of Donner Creek (right) with Truckee River
