= Little Truckee River =

River in California

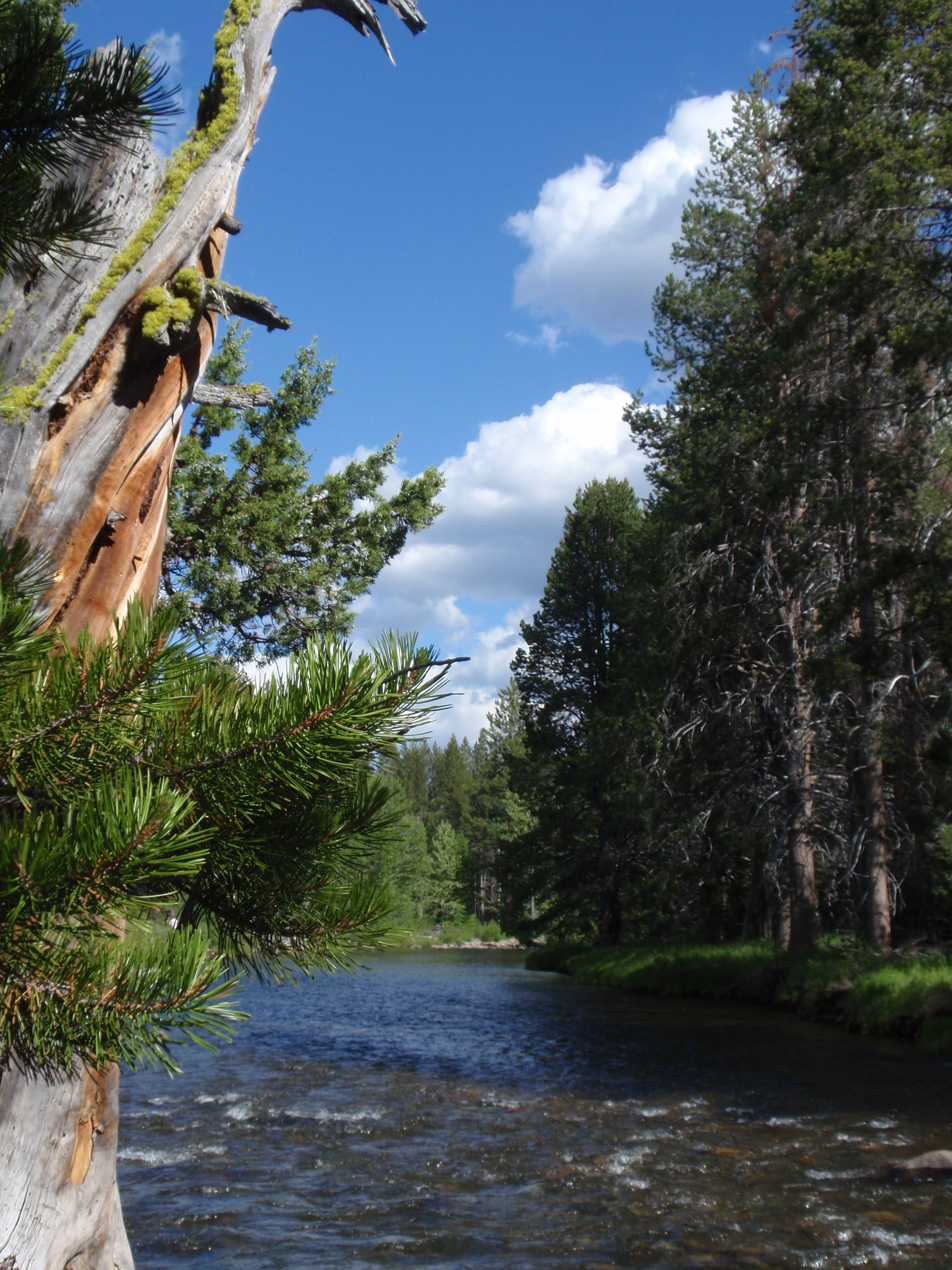
- The upper Little Truckee River

- Location of mouth

Location
- Country: United States
- State: California
- Region: Nevada and Sierra Counties

Physical characteristics
- Source: Northern flank of western arm of Mount Lola in eastern Sierra Nevada
  - location: 35 mi (56 km) west/southwest of Reno, Nevada
  - coordinates: 39°25′50″N 120°24′38″W
  - elevation: 7,502 ft (2,287 m)
- Mouth: Truckee River
  - location: Boca, California and Truckee, California
  - coordinates: 39°23′04″N 120°05′40″W
  - elevation: 5,493 ft (1,674 m)
- Length: 34.3 mi (55.2 km)

Basin features
- Tributaries
  - left: Webber Creek (from Webber Lake), Davies Creek
  - right: Cold Stream, Independence Creek, Sagehen Creek, Dry Creek

The Little Truckee River is a 34.3-mile-long (55.2 km) river that is a tributary to its larger counterpart, the Truckee River, north of Lake Tahoe. It drains the eastern flank of the Sierra Nevada, flowing through Sierra County and Nevada County in eastern California.

== History ==
The Little Truckee River, like the Truckee River and Upper Truckee River, was named after a Paiute chief known as Truckee, who in 1844 guided the Stephens–Townsend–Murphy Party from the Humboldt Sink in western Nevada to California via the Truckee River, Donner Lake, and Donner Pass.

After Congress authorized the Truckee Storage Project in 1935, the United States Bureau of Reclamation (BOR) began construction of Boca Dam on the Little Truckee River. The dam is operated by the Washoe County Water Conservation District and was completed in 1939.

After Congressional authorization of the Washoe Project in 1958, the BOR completed the Stampede Dam in 1970. As a result of litigation in 1982 (Carson-Truckee Water Conservancy District v. Watt), a Federal court upheld a determination that the obligations of the Secretary of the Interior (then James G. Watt) under the Endangered Species Act took precedence over his authority to contract for delivery of water for irrigation and municipal (M&I) uses. The judgement required all storage in Stampede Reservoir to be used to provide water for the threatened and endangered Pyramid Lake cui-ui (Chasmistes cujus) and Lahontan cutthroat trout (Oncorhynchus clarkii henshawii) fishes.

== Watershed and course ==
The Little Truckee River watershed drains 172 square miles (450 km^{2}). The Little Truckee River initially flows north on the western flank of Mount Lola within the Tahoe National Forest of Nevada County, California in the eastern Sierra Nevada. After entering Sierra County from Nevada County, the river picks up flows from Webber Lake and turns east to Stampede Reservoir, then turns south to flow back into Nevada County and then Boca Reservoir, and after that terminates at its confluence with the Truckee River.

== Ecology ==
Historically, Lahontan cutthroat trout spawned in this Truckee River tributary, but due to passage barriers and non-native introductions which prey on and/or hybridize with native trout, Lahontan cutthroat are no longer found in the river. The dominant species in the river are non-native brown trout (Salmo trutta) and rainbow trout (Oncorhynchus mykiss) and in the reservoirs, Kokanee salmon (Oncorhynchus nerka) and Mackinaw trout (Salvelinus namaycush).

== See also ==
- Truckee River
- Upper Truckee River
- Pyramid Lake
