= Boca Reservoir =

Artificial lake in California

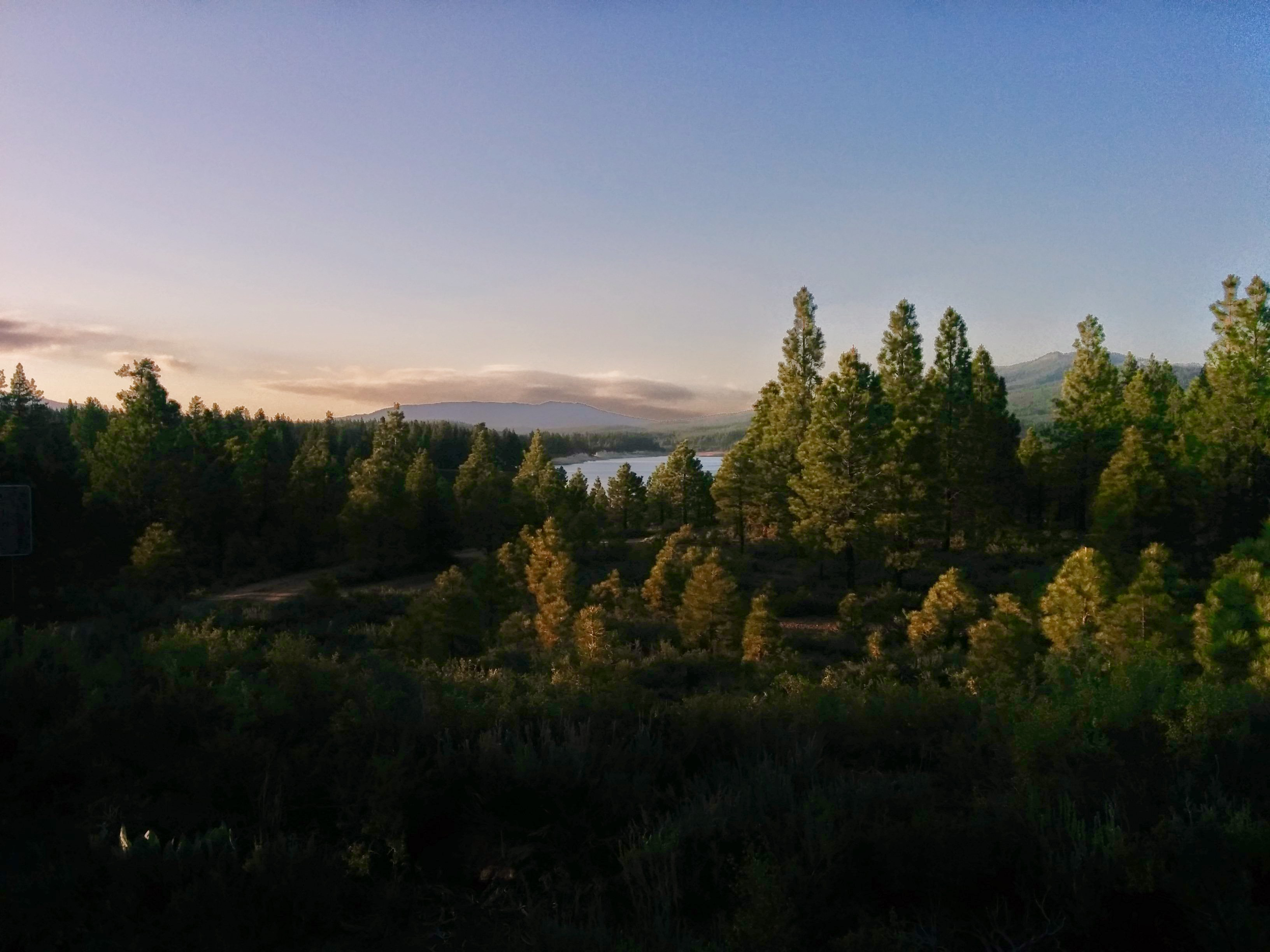

- Location within California Location within the United States
- Location: Tahoe National Forest; Nevada County, California, U.S.
- Coordinates: 39.3901°N 120.0954°W
- Lake type: Reservoir
- Primary inflows: Little Truckee River
- Primary outflows: Little Truckee River
- Catchment area: 450 km^{2} (170 sq mi)
- Basin countries: United States
- Max. length: 3 km (1.9 mi)
- Max. width: 1.5 km (0.93 mi)
- Surface area: 4 km^{2} (1.5 sq mi)
- Water volume: 41,110 acre⋅ft (50,710,000 m^{3})
- Surface elevation: 1,711 m (5,614 ft)
- References: U.S. Geological Survey Geographic Names Information System: Boca Reservoir

Boca Reservoir is an artificial lake in Nevada County, California, United States, located in the perimeter covered by Tahoe National Forest. It was created by the construction of Boca Dam across Little Truckee River, approximately 10 km northeast of Truckee. It is located downstream (south) of Stampede Dam and to the east of Prosser Creek Dam and Prosser Creek Reservoir.

== See also ==
- List of dams and reservoirs in California
- List of lakes in California
