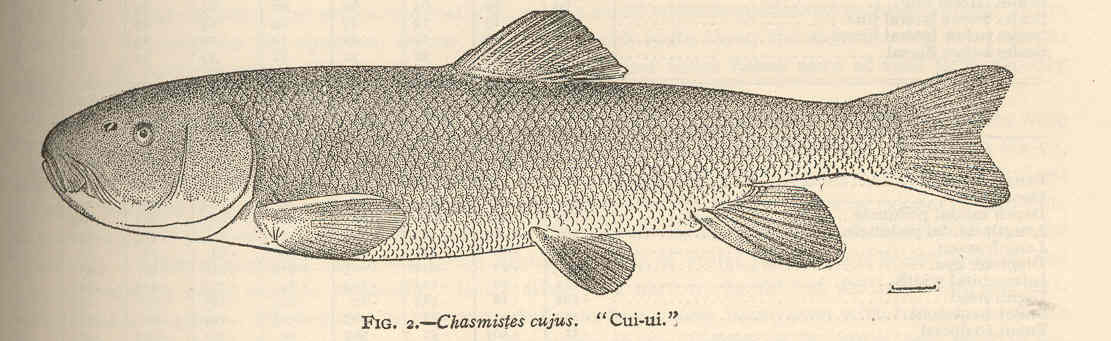

Conservation status
- Endangered (IUCN 3.1)
- CITES Appendix I (CITES)

Scientific classification
- Kingdom: Animalia
- Phylum: Chordata
- Class: Actinopterygii
- Order: Cypriniformes
- Family: Catostomidae
- Genus: Chasmistes
- Species: C. cujus

Binomial name
- Chasmistes cujus Cope, 1883

= Cui-ui =

Species of fish

The cui-ui (Chasmistes cujus) is a large sucker fish endemic to Pyramid Lake and, prior to its desiccation in the 20th century, Winnemucca Lake in northwestern Nevada. It feeds primarily on zooplankton and possibly on nanoplankton (such as algae and diatoms). The maximum size of male cui-ui is approximately 53 cm (21 in) and 1.6 kg (3.5 lb), while females reach approximately 64 cm (25 in) and 2.7 kg (6.0 lb). A cui-ui typically lives for 40 years but does not reach sexual maturity until at least age eight. The cui-ui is an endangered species, and one of the few surviving members of its genus.

The cui-ui population is generally improving in numbers, having attained an estimated population exceeding one million in 1993, thanks to the efforts of the U.S. Environmental Protection Agency in analysis of the Truckee River spawning grounds and of the Nevada Department of Environmental Protection and EPA in following up on protection measures. The reason the cui-ui remains endangered (though upgraded from critically endangered in 2014) is the recent history of recruitment variation, illustrating that in many years of the 1970s and 1980s there was virtually no recruitment whatsoever due to unsuccessful spawning in an unfavorable water quality and water flow environment of the Truckee River. The species' outlook is uncertain since a recovery plan based on an enhanced understanding of Pyramid Lake and Truckee River water quality has been published and U.S. Congress adopted a protection plan.

== Pyramid Lake water quality ==
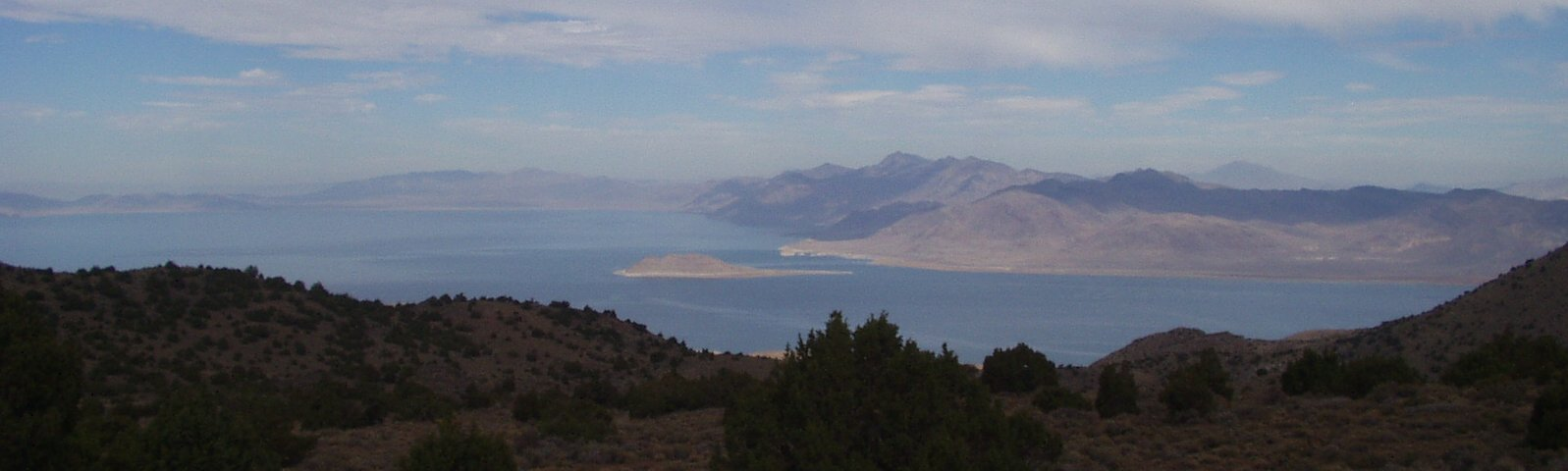
Pyramid Lake is the only location cui-ui are found.

Pyramid Lake, the second largest natural lake in the western U.S. prior to construction of the Derby Dam, has been the focus of several water quality investigations, the most detailed starting in the mid-1980s. Under direction of the U.S. Environmental Protection Agency, a comprehensive dynamic hydrology transport model was developed by Earth Metrics Inc.; the model's name was subsequently changed to DSSAM, and it was applied to analyze impacts of a variety of land use and wastewater management decisions throughout the 3,120-square-mile (8,100 km^{2}) Truckee River Basin. Analytes addressed included nitrogen, reactive phosphate, dissolved oxygen, and ten other parameters. Based upon use of the model, some decisions have been influenced to enhance Pyramid Lake water quality and aid the viability of Pyramid Lake biota, including the cui-ui. The dynamic river model was particularly useful for analyzing Truckee River temperature variations, since the cui-ui often swim upstream to spawn, and their fry are vulnerable to elevations in river temperature.

== Spawning behavior ==
The cui-ui is potamodromous, and will attempt to ascend the Truckee River to spawn in mid-April. If inflow is insufficient to permit this, the cui-ui may attempt to spawn in Pyramid Lake, but generally with little success due to the salinity of that lake. Water releases from the Boca reservoir and Stampede reservoirs were (as of 2004) timed to assist the spawning run, although in drought years this water is reserved for the Reno metropolitan area. These releases are critical to successful spawning since low warm flows at the Truckee River delta are inhospitable to upstream migration of adults.

The Pyramid Lake Paiute Tribe of the Pyramid Lake Reservation maintain three hatcheries to ensure the long term viability of the cui-ui. These measures have greatly increased cui-ui populations, although it is still listed as an endangered species.

== Cultural history ==
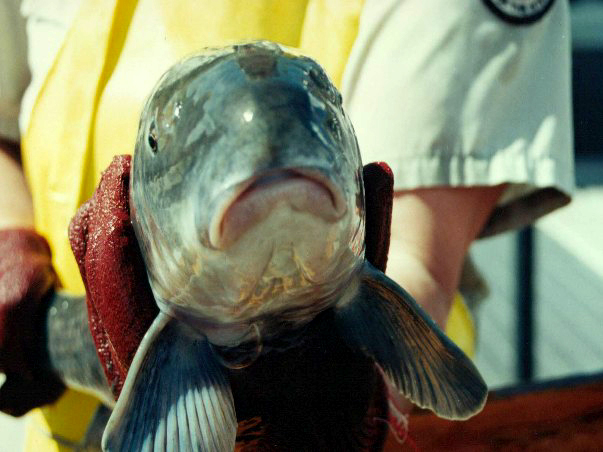
Cui-ui

The Pyramid Lake Paiute Tribe are the Cui-ui Ticutta, also spelled Kuyuidikado, which translated to "cui-ui eaters." Together with the Lahontan cutthroat trout (Oncorhynchus clarkii henshawi) the cui-ui was an important food supply for the Cui-ui Tikutta and neighboring Paiute bands who traveled to Pyramid Lake to share in the harvest during the spring spawning runs.

Subsequent to European American settlement of western Nevada in the 1860s many Cui-ui Ticutta made a living by selling fish, although the European Americans generally preferred trout to cui-ui. Cui-ui were also still important for subsistence, despite Bureau of Indian Affairs attempts to encourage farming and discourage fishing.

After the 1905 construction of Derby Dam which diverted much of the Truckee River's flow, the Pyramid Lake fishery declined. By 1930, it no longer supplied even subsistence food. Although conditions have improved recently, the cui-ui are managed for cultural and ecological purposes, not as a human food source.

== See also ==
- Surface runoff
- Thermal pollution
