= Stampede Dam =

Dam in Sierra County, California, United States

Coordinates: 39°28′32″N 120°06′14″W

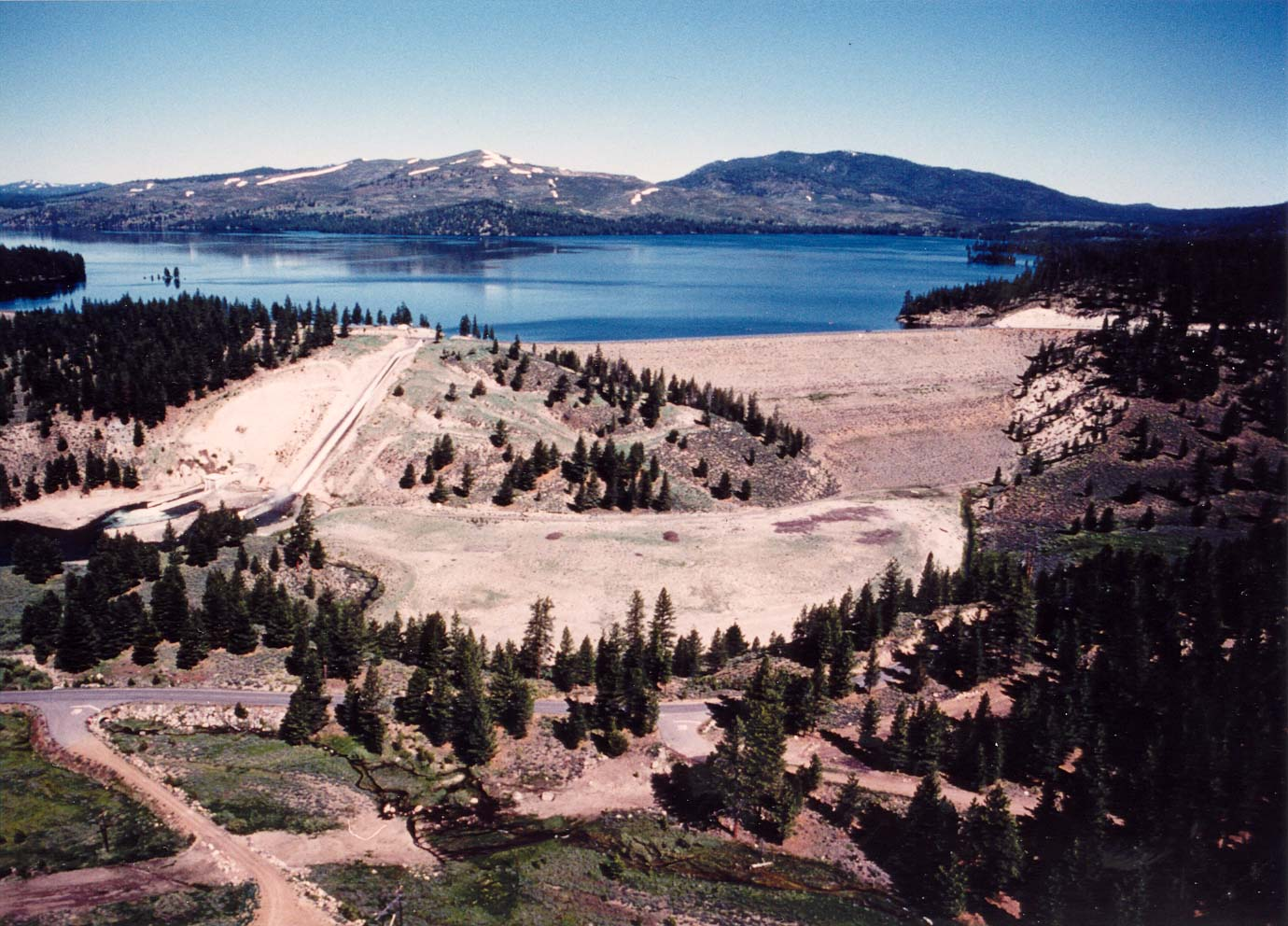
Stampede Dam and Reservoir

Stampede Dam (National ID # CA10192) is a dam in Sierra County, California, impounding the Little Truckee River.

The earthen and rock-filled dam was constructed in 1970; 56 years ago, at 239 feet (73 m) high and 1,511 feet (461 m) long at the crest. It was a project of the United States Bureau of Reclamation, not primarily for flood control or irrigation storage as usual, but for fishery enhancement, primarily to facilitate the spawning of the critically endangered species cui-ui fish downstream. The dam is owned and operated by the Bureau.

The reservoir it creates, Stampede Reservoir, has a water surface elevation of 5,955 feet (1,815 m) and an area of about 3,340 acres (1,350 ha) and about 25 miles (40 km) of shoreline, with a maximum capacity of 226,500 acre-feet (279,400,000 m^{3}). Recreation includes fishing (for kokanee salmon, rainbow, brook, brown and lake (mackinaw) trout, etc.), hunting, boating, camping and hiking. There is an accessible viewing platform at Stampede Vista Point.

== See also ==
- List of lakes in California
- List of dams and reservoirs in California
