= Donner Lake =

Freshwater lake in California, United States

- Donner Lake as seen from McGlashan Point

- Location within California Location within the United States
- Location: Truckee, California, United States
- Coordinates: 39°19′22″N 120°15′52″W
- Type: moraine-dammed lake
- Primary inflows: Summit Creek, Gregory Creek, and many springs
- Primary outflows: Donner Creek to Truckee River
- Basin countries: United States
- Max. length: 2.7 m (8 ft 10 in)
- Max. width: 0.6 m (2 ft 0 in)
- Surface area: 1.31 m^{2} (14.1 sq ft)
- Max. depth: 238 ft (72.1 m)
- Surface elevation: 5936 ft (1809 m)
- Settlements: Truckee

Donner Lake, formerly known as Truckee Lake, is a freshwater lake in Northeast California on the eastern slope of the Sierra Nevada and about 20 miles (32 km) northwest of the much larger Lake Tahoe. A moraine serves as a natural dam for the lake. The lake is located in the town of Truckee, between Interstate 80 to the north and Schallenberger Ridge to the south. The tracks of the Union Pacific Railroad run along Schallenberger Ridge and closely follow the route of the original transcontinental railroad. The historic route of the Lincoln Highway, the first automobile road across America and US 40 follows the northern shoreline, then climbs to Donner Pass from where the entire lake may be viewed.

== History of the name of the lake ==
The lake was called Datsa’ shut by the Washoe people. In 1844, the Stephens-Townsend-Murphy party was the first wagon train to successfully cross the Sierra Nevada mountains. Before them, in January 1844, John C. Frémont and Kit Carson found the river, which Frémont named as Salmon-Trout River for the fish in it. They enjoyed the company of the Paiutes in the area, as did later pioneers seeking to cross at this pass.

The wagon train group named it Truckee Lake, from the help given them by a Paiute Chief; they understood him to be calling the river and lake by the word Truckee. They left six wagons at the lake. They took five other wagons across the pass into the Central Valley on November 25, 1844.

Both the lake and the pass were named after the ill-fated Donner Party, which wintered involuntarily near the lake in 1846.

Donner Memorial State Park was established in 1928; it is not clear when the name of the lake was changed from Truckee to Donner. The state park is on the east end of the lake and provides campsites with access to several different beaches. There are also hiking trails in the park.

== Fishing ==
The lake's depth has been measured by the California State Lands Commission to be 238 feet (73 m) deep at its deepest point. High water level is 5,935.8 feet (1,809.2 m) above Mean Sea Level.

Donner Lake holds some of the biggest lake trout in the state. There is also a good population of rainbow and brown trout as well as Kokanee salmon. Fisherman use downriggers and troll with plugs for Kokanee salmon and rainbow trout in order to catch the trophy-sized lake trout. During the spring and fall lake trout come to the top to feed, and these are the only times of year one has the chance to hook a laker in shallow water.

A public boat ramp operated by the Truckee Donner Recreation & Parks District is available in the northwest corner of Donner Lake. A fee is charged for boat launching. The lake is open to both powerboats and sailboats.

The California Office of Environmental Health Hazard Assessment (OEHHA) has developed an advisory for Donner Lake based on mercury and PCBs found in fish caught from this water body. The advisory provides safe eating advice for fish species caught in the body of water.

== Recreation ==
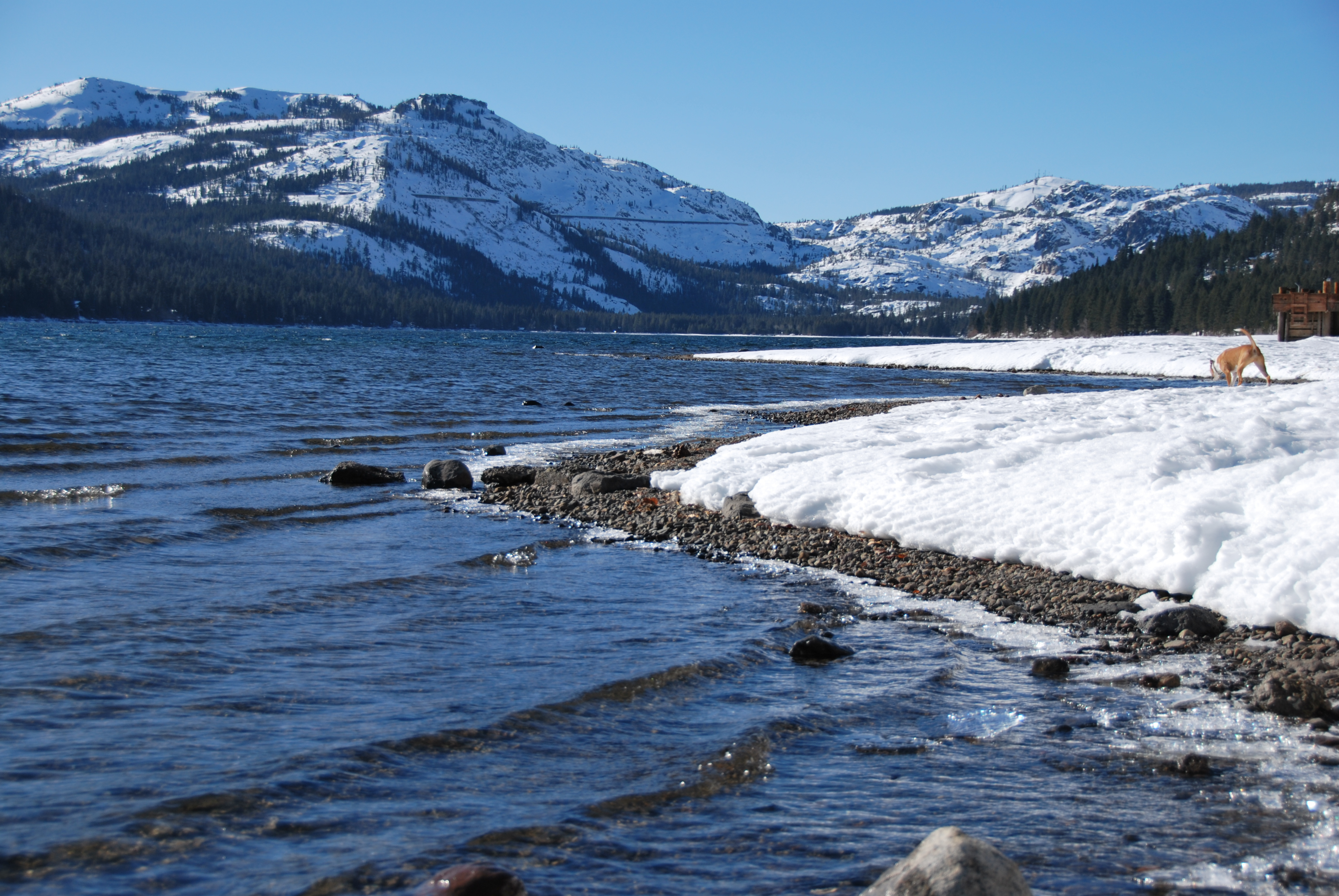
Standing on North East shore, looking across towards Donner Pass

Donner Memorial State Park wraps around the East and part of the South shore of the Lake, encompassing Scallenberger Ridge to the south. Summer activities include: camping, picnicking, boating, fishing, water-skiing, wind-surfing, hiking, and mountain biking. Winter activities include cross-country skiing and snowshoeing. The Park features the Pioneer Monument - welcoming visitors year round - which was built to commemorate the Donner Party traveling to California from the east in the mid-19th century. The statue itself is positioned 23 feet (7.0 m) high, which is said to be the depth snow reached during the winter of 1846 when the Donner Party failed to make it over the pass.

The North shore of the Lake hosts 1.5 miles (2.4 km) of public docks for both swimmers and boaters. The Donner Lake Triathlon is held every year, which consists of the Sprint Triathlon: .25 miles (400 m) swim, 6 miles (9.7 km) bike, 2 miles (3.2 km) run and the International Triathlon: 1.5 kilometers (0.93 mi), 40 kilometers (25 mi), 6.5 miles (10.5 km) run.

=== Hiking ===
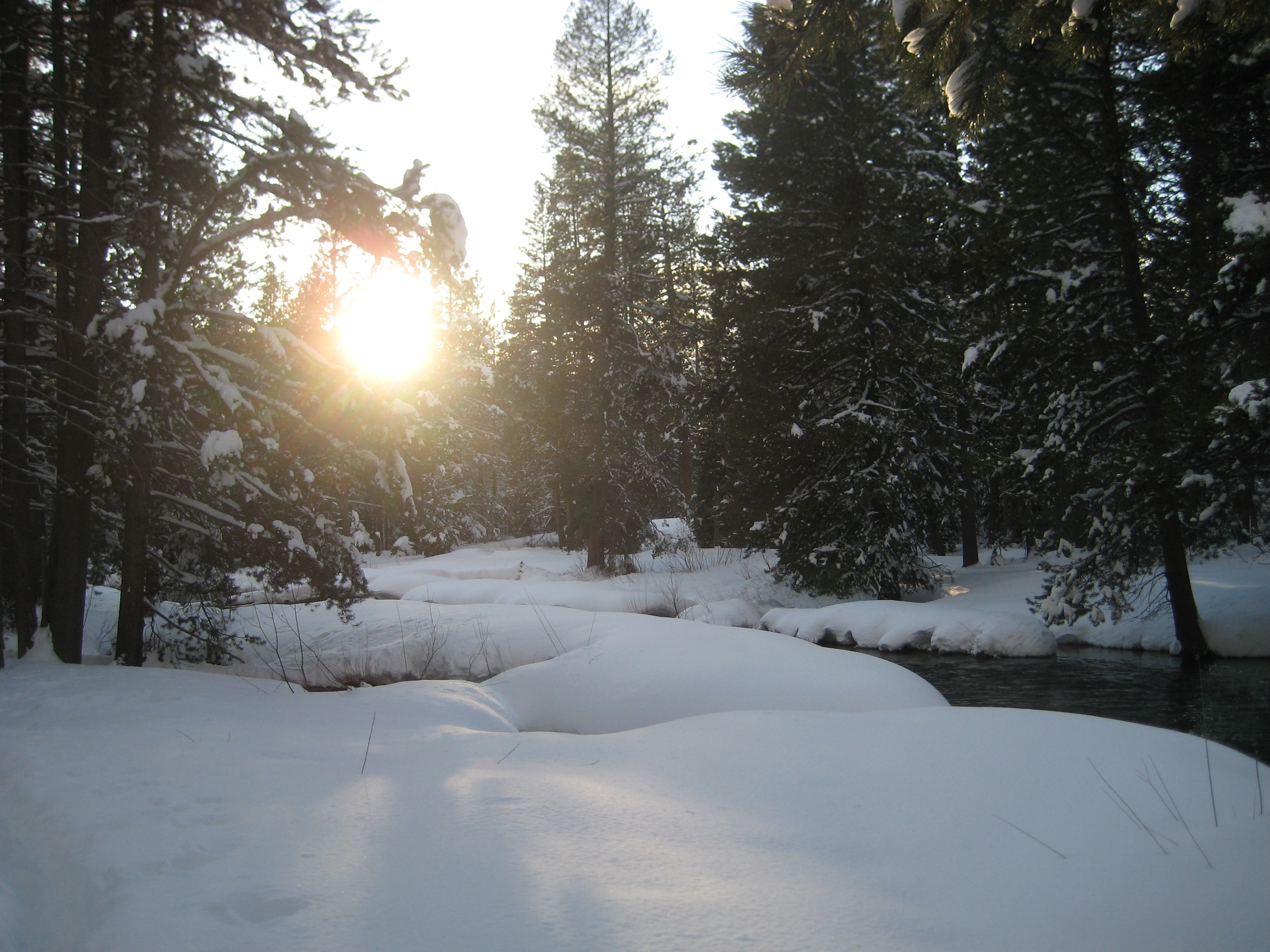
Hiking through Donner Memorial State Park in the winter.

There are roughly 2.5 miles (4.0 km) of hiking trails inside the Park. Visitors can legally park in Coldstream Canyon (just past the 76 gas station) which contains the alignment of the primary Emigrant Trail, which leads up to U.S. Forest Service and the Pacific Crest trails beyond the park. Donner Lake is roughly 8 miles (13 km) around.

=== Camping ===
There are 154 sites to camp at in the park and a day-use area along the lake. A lakeside interpretive trail has 18 interpretive panels which discuss the natural and cultural resources in the local area.

== See also ==
- List of dams and reservoirs in California
- List of lakes in California
