= Truckee River =

River in Nevada and California, United States

Truckee River: Kuyuinahukwa (Northern Paiute); ‘Át’abi wá·t’a (Washo); wá·tia t’íyel (Washo); Á·waku wá·t’a (Washo); Balŋáćaŋ wá·ta (Washo); Salmon Trout River
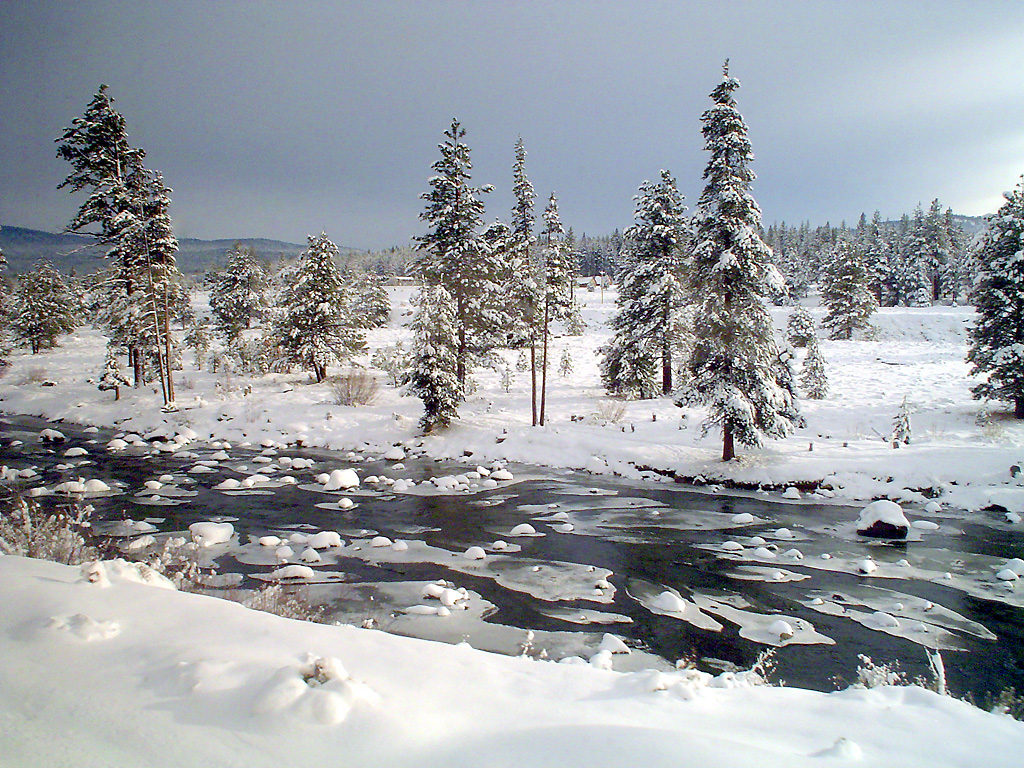
- The Truckee River just east of Truckee, California

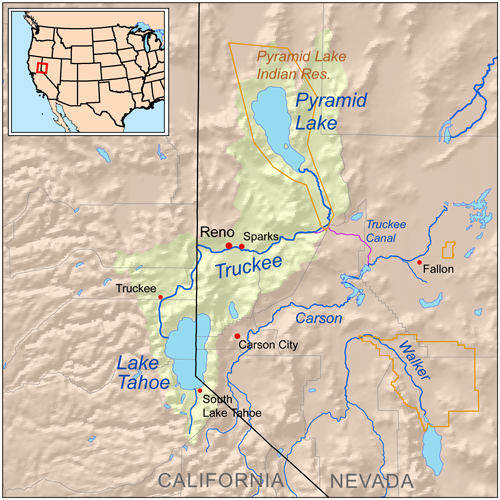
- Map of the Pyramid Lake drainage basin
- Etymology: Named after the Paiute chief Truckee
- Native name: Kuyuinahukwa (Northern Paiute); ‘Át’abi wá·t’a (Washo); wá·tia t’íyel (Washo); Á·waku wá·t’a (at Pyramid Lake) (Washo); Debeyúmewe (at Lake Tahoe) (Washo); Balŋáćaŋ wá·ta (Washo)

Location
- Country: United States
- State: California, Nevada

Physical characteristics
- Source: Lake Tahoe
  - location: Sierra Nevada, California
  - coordinates: 39°10′3″N 120°8′39″W
  - elevation: 6,233 ft (1,900 m)
- Mouth: Pyramid Lake
  - location: Nevada
  - coordinates: 39°51′27″N 119°26′53″W
  - elevation: 3,793 ft (1,156 m)
- Length: 121 mi (195 km)
- Basin size: 3,060 sq mi (7,900 km^{2})
- Discharge
  - location: USGS gage 10350000, Truckee River at Vista, NV
  - average: 804 cu ft/s (22.8 m^{3}/s)
  - minimum: 7 cu ft/s (0.20 m^{3}/s)
  - maximum: 17,400 cu ft/s (490 m^{3}/s)

The Truckee River is a river in the U.S. states of California and Nevada. The river flows northeasterly and is 121 miles (195 km) long. The Truckee is the sole outlet of Lake Tahoe and drains part of the high Sierra Nevada, emptying into Pyramid Lake in the Great Basin. Its waters are an important source of irrigation along its valley and adjacent valleys.

== Naming of the river ==
A Northern Paiute word for the Truckee is Kuyuinahukwa. Kuyui- refers to the Cui-ui, a species of fish endemic to Pyramid Lake which is central to the lives of the Northern Paiute band called the Kooyooe Tukadu (cui-ui-fish-eaters).

In the Washo language, different parts of the river have different names. Two names, ‘Át’abi wá·t’a and Á·waku wá·t’a translate to "trout stream." The latter name refers to the river at and around Pyramid Lake. At the outlet at Lake Tahoe, there are multiple names as well. Dawbayódok is said to refer to the area when one is situated "on the down side" of the outlet, while Dawbayóduwé is used when one is "on the up side." Debeyúmewe, translated as "coming out," is less specific.

When John C. Frémont and Kit Carson ascended the Truckee River on January 16, 1844, they called it the Salmon Trout River, after the huge Lahontan cutthroat trout (Oncorhynchus clarki henshawi) that ran up the river from Pyramid Lake to spawn. However, the river was ultimately named after a Paiute chief known as Truckee, who in 1844 guided an emigrant party from the headwaters of the Humboldt River to California via the Truckee River, Donner Lake, and Donner Pass. Appreciative of their Native American guide's services, the party named the river after him. The chief's real name might not have been Truckee, but perhaps Tru-ki-zo, which could have become distorted as "Truckee". There are numerous other theories about Chief Truckee and his name.

== Course and watershed ==
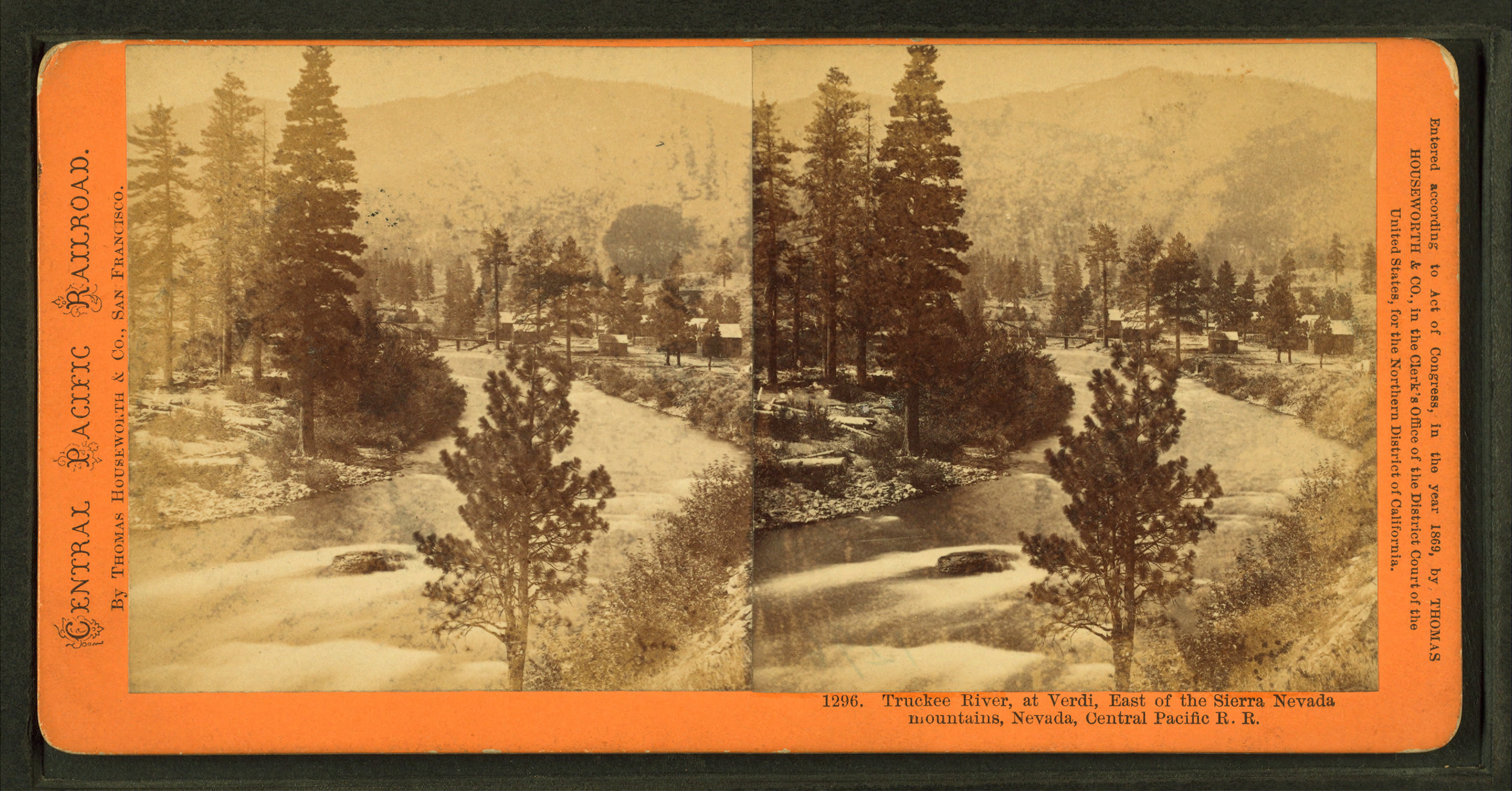
The Truckee River at Verdi, Nevada, when the Central Pacific Railroad reached the site in 1868

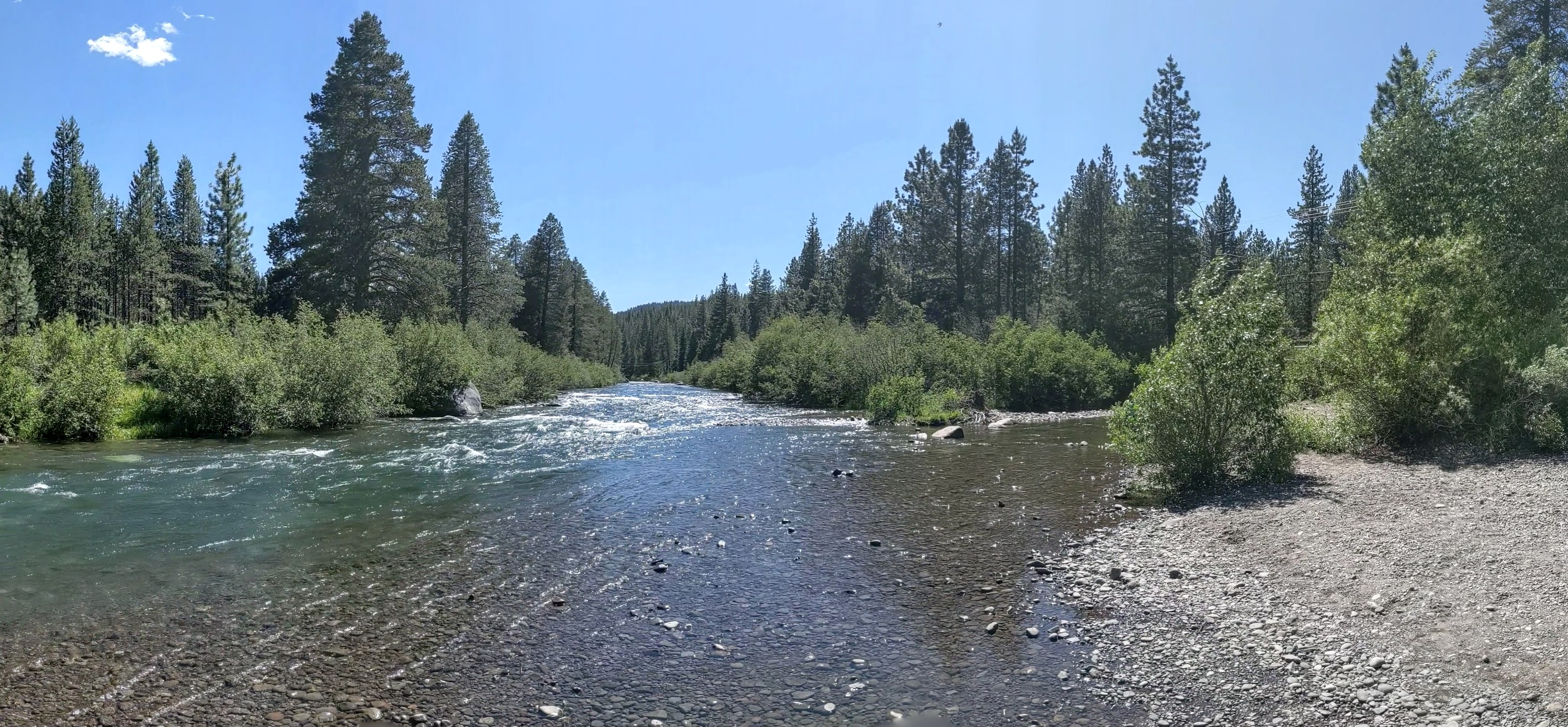
The Truckee River in Truckee, California, with Donner Creek flowing in from the right

The Truckee River's source is the outlet of Lake Tahoe, at the dam on the northwest side of the lake near Tahoe City, California. It flows generally northeast through the mountains to Truckee, California, then turns sharply to the east and flows into Nevada, through Reno and Sparks and along the northern end of the Carson Range. At Fernley it turns north, flowing along the east side of the Pah Rah Range. It empties into the southern end of Pyramid Lake, a remnant of prehistoric Lake Lahontan, in northern Washoe County in the Pyramid Lake Indian Reservation.

The Truckee River's endorheic drainage basin is about 3,060 square miles (7,900 km^{2}), of which about 2,300 square miles (6,000 km^{2}) are in Nevada. The Middle Watershed is regarded as the 15 miles (24 km) of river and its tributaries from Tahoe City in Placer County, through the Town of Truckee in Nevada County, to the state line between Sierra and Washoe counties. The major tributaries to the Truckee River in California from the Lake Tahoe outlet and heading downstream include: Bear Creek, Washeshu Creek, Cabin Creek, Pole Creek, Donner Creek, Trout Creek, Martis Creek, Prosser Creek, the Little Truckee River, Gray Creek, and Bronco Creek. Major lakes and reservoirs in the California part of the watershed include Lake Tahoe, Donner Lake, Independence Lake (California), Webber Lake, Boca Reservoir, Stampede Reservoir, Prosser Creek Reservoir, and Martis Creek Reservoir. In the Lower Watershed, Steamboat Creek, which drains Washoe Lake, is the major tributary to the Truckee River. The Steamboat Ditch, a 34 mi (55 km) irrigation canal constructed in 1880, diverts water from the Truckee near the California-Nevada border and terminates at Steamboat Creek in south Reno.

== River modifications ==
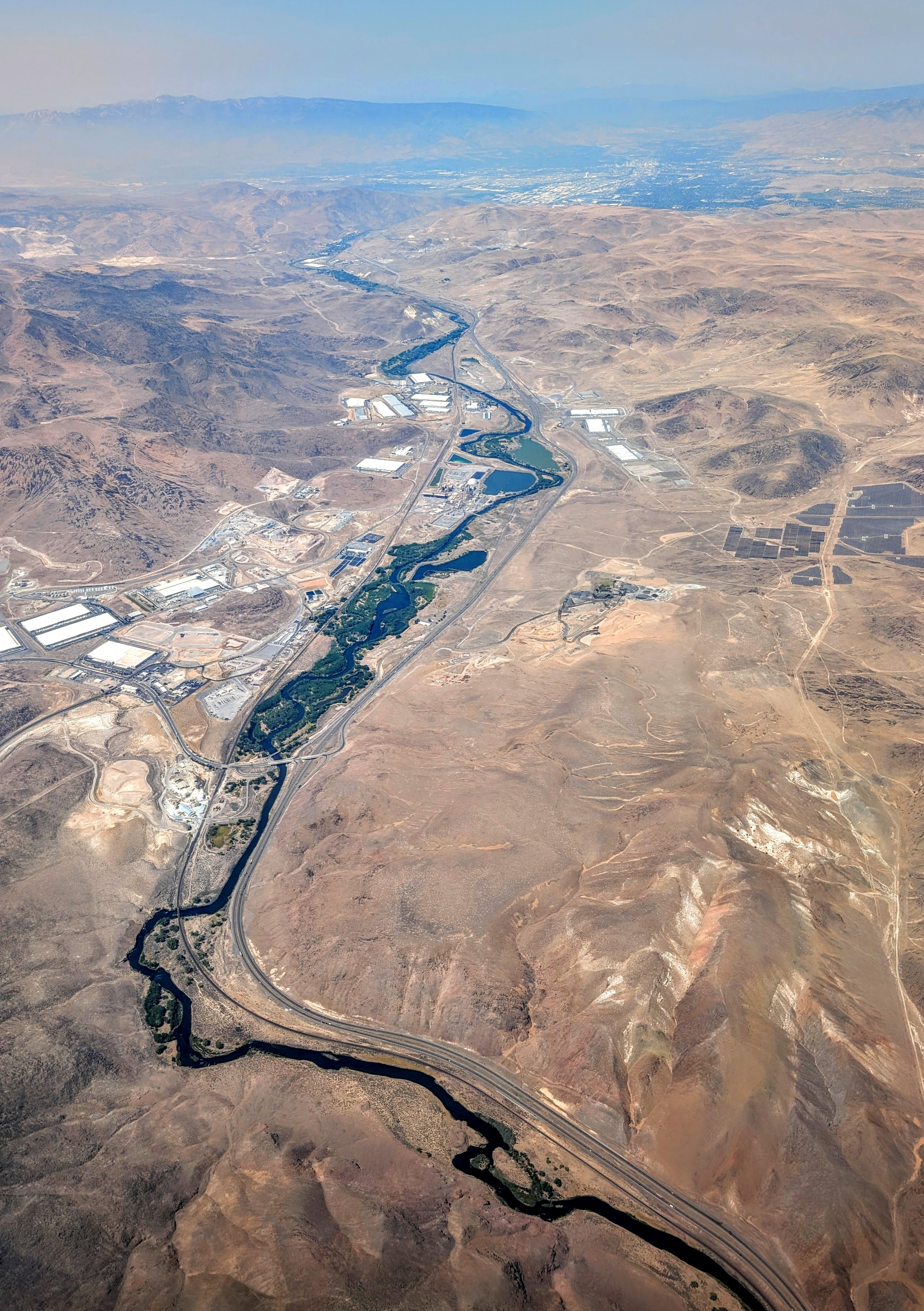
Aerial view looking upstream (west) along Interstate 80 from near Clark, Nevada, toward Sparks, Nevada, and the mountains beyond

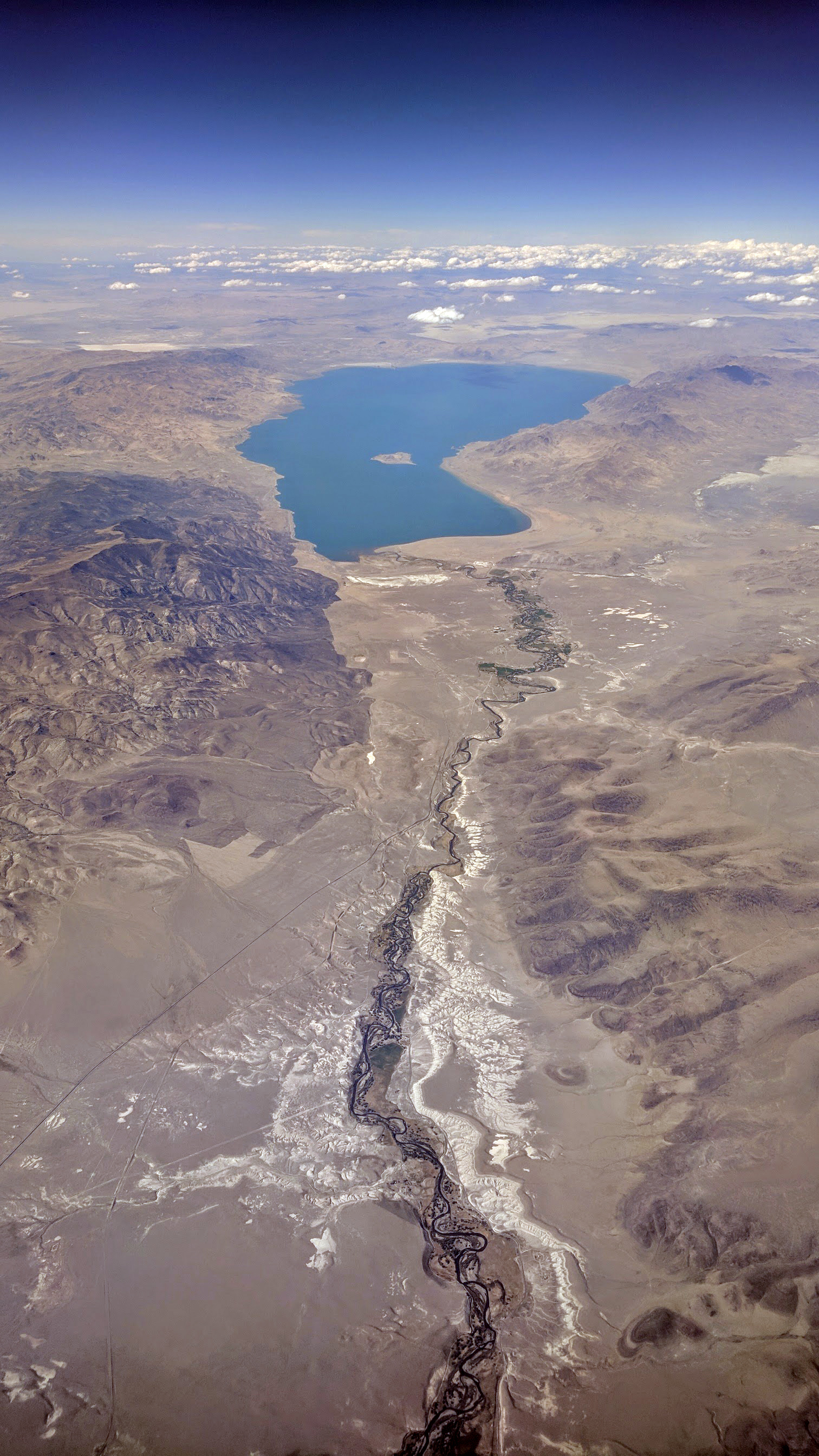
Aerial view looking downstream (north) where the Truckee River drains to Pyramid Lake

Like many other rivers in the western United States, the Truckee's flow is highly regulated, with most river flow fully allocated through a system of water rights, set in 2015 by the Truckee River Operating Agreement. This system over-allocates available water during low flow periods. Disputes occur among those asserting rights to the water. In the early 20th century, the Newlands Reclamation Act instituted a diversion that removed river flows from the Truckee River watershed and transferred them to the Carson River watershed. Currently the Truckee–Carson Irrigation District supervises the diversion of approximately one-third of the river flow at the Derby Dam to the Lahontan Valley to irrigate alfalfa and pastures. Truckee River water is also supplied to the resort communities surrounding Lake Tahoe, the greater metropolitan area of Reno and Sparks, and the Pyramid Lake Paiute Indian Reservation. The U.S. Fish and Wildlife Service uses some of the water to induce spawning of the endangered fish cui-ui and to provide drought relief.

== Ecology ==
Beavers were re-introduced to the Truckee River watershed and Tahoe Basin by the California Department of Fish and Game (CDFG) and the U. S. Forest Service between 1934 and 1949 in order to prevent stream degradation and to promote wetland restoration. That beaver were once native to the area is supported by the fact that the Washo have a word for beaver, c'imhélhel and the northern Paiute of Walker Lake, Honey Lake and Pyramid Lake have a word for beaver su-i'-tu-ti-kut'-teh. When Stephen Powers visited the northern Paiute to collect Indian materials for the Smithsonian Institution in preparation for the Centennial Exhibition of 1876, he reported that the northern Paiute wrapped their hair in strips of beaver fur, made medicine from parts of beaver and that their creation legend included beaver. In addition, fur trapper Stephen Hall Meek "set his traps on the Truckee River in 1833", which strongly suggests that he saw a beaver or beaver sign. Supporting this line of evidence, Tappe records in 1941 an eyewitness who said beaver were plentiful on the eastern slope of the Sierra Nevada on the upper part of the Carson River and its tributaries in Alpine County until 1892 when they fell victim to heavy trapping. James "Grizzly" Adams' also reports trapping beaver in the lower Carson River around 1860, "In the evening we caught a fine lot of salmon-trout (Cutthroat trout), using grasshoppers for bait, and in the night killed half a dozen beavers, which were very tame." Recent novel physical evidence of beaver's historic presence in the Sierra Nevada was the discovery of beaver dams dating to the 1850s in Red Clover Creek in the Feather River watershed. The presence of beaver dams has been shown to either increase the number of fish, their size, or both, in a study of brook, rainbow and brown trout in nearby Sagehen Creek, which flows into the Little Truckee River at an altitude of 5,800 feet (1,800 m) and is a stream typical of the eastern slope of the northern Sierra Nevada. Not only have aspen and cottonwood survived ongoing beaver colonization but a recent study of ten Tahoe streams utilizing aerial multispectral videography, including Trout Creek and Cold Creek, has shown that deciduous, thick and thin herbaceous vegetation has increased near beaver dams, whereas coniferous trees are decreased. Benefits of beaver dams include removal of sediment and excessive pollutants travelling downstream, which improves water clarity, which was shown to worsen when beaver dams were recently removed in nearby Taylor Creek and Ward Creek. Flooding from beaver dams is relatively inexpensively controlled with flow devices.

== Recreation ==
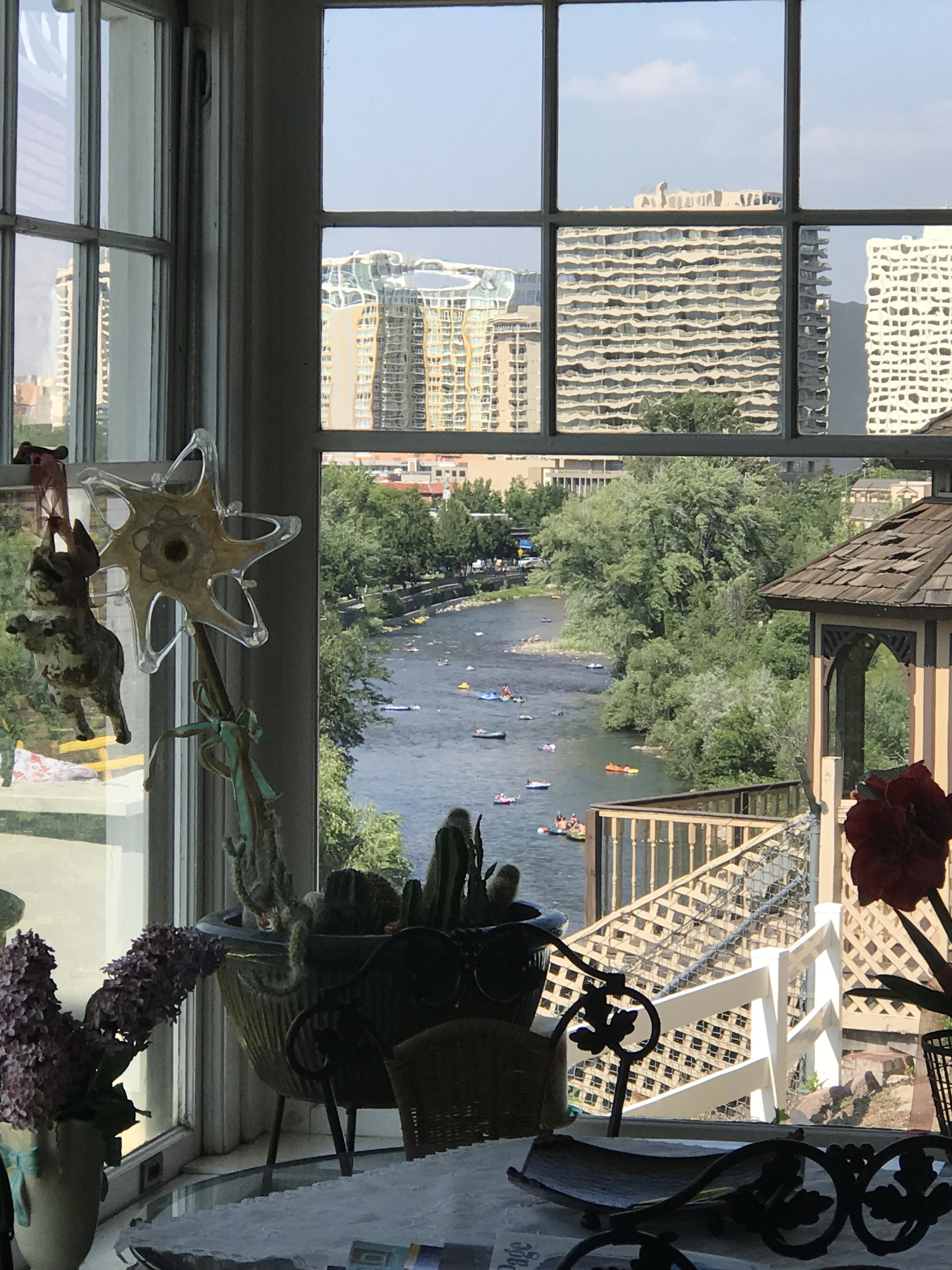
Rafting and tubing for recreation on the Truckee River in Reno Nevada USA on the 4th of July 2018

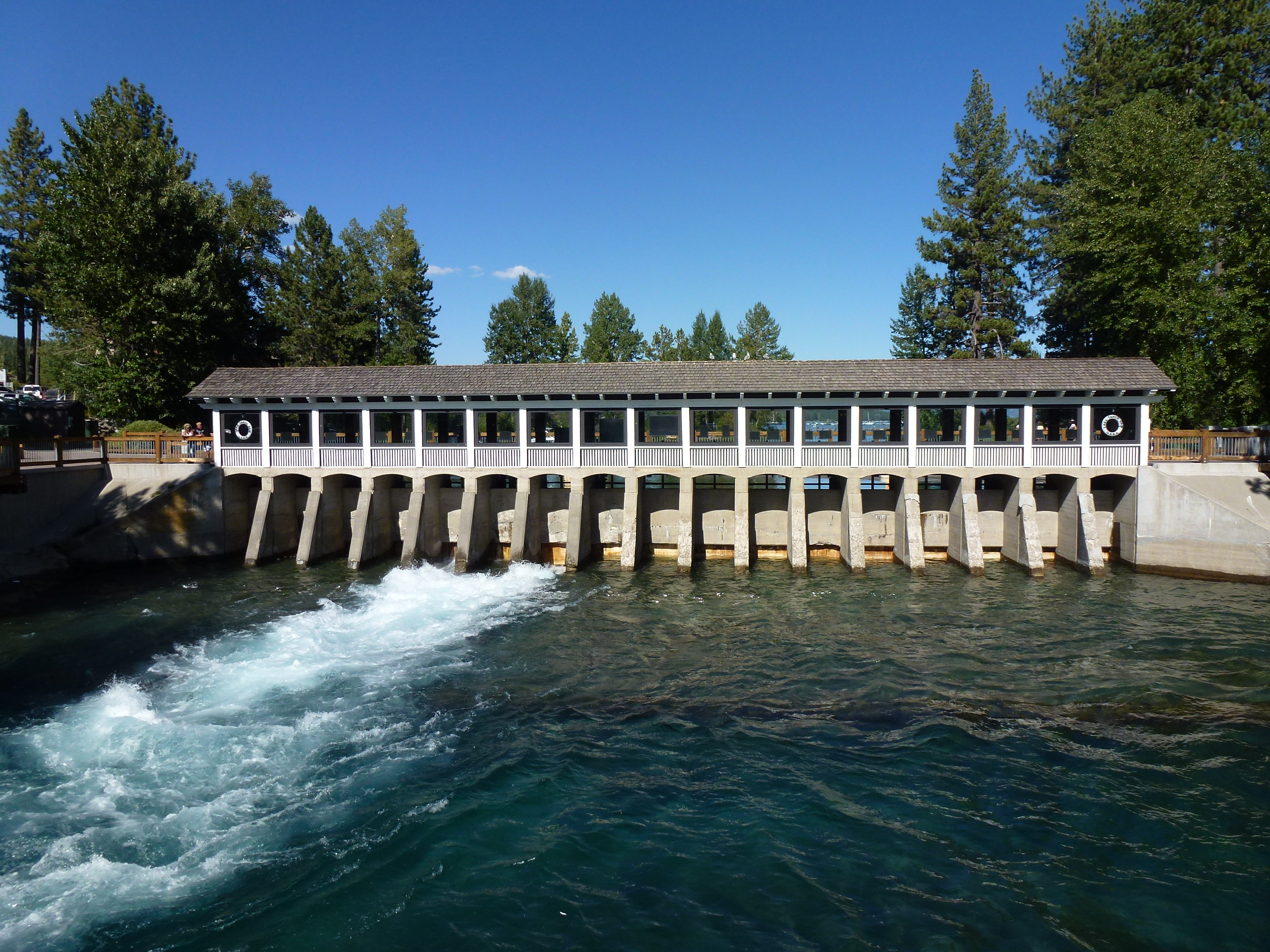
The headwaters of the Truckee River at Lake Tahoe Dam

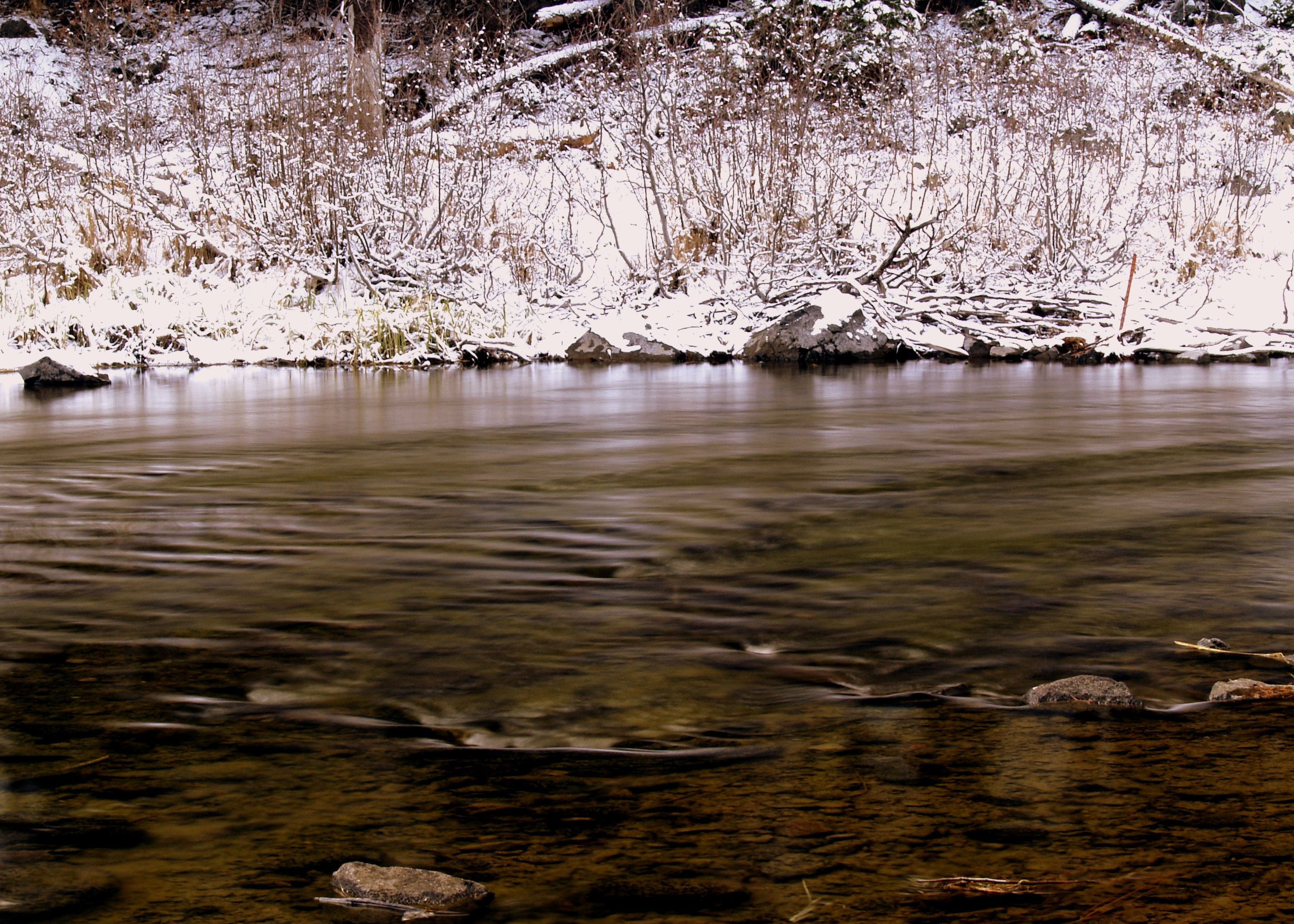
The Truckee River near Truckee, California.

The river is heavily used for recreation, including whitewater rafting and fly fishing. A common rafting run is the River Ranch Run. Starting from the outlet gates at Lake Tahoe stretching about 3 miles (4.8 km), the run ends at the River Ranch Restaurant. These rapids are almost all class 1 and class 2. In downtown Reno the river has been sculpted into a half-mile Class 2/3 whitewater park, and is used mainly for kayaking.

The Truckee River is western Nevada's largest river. It supports a large sport fishing population each year. Kim Tisdale of the Nevada Department of Wildlife (NDOW), is the state's Western Regions Fishery Supervisor; she commented that NDOW's goal is for a catch rate of one to two fish per hour in the Truckee. To accomplish this, NDOW stocks a total of 105,000 trout per year. 70,000 of those are native Lahontan cutthroat trout (Oncorhynchus clarki henshawi) and the rest are non-native Rainbow trout (Oncorhynchus mykiss). The Truckee also boasts a healthy, self-sustaining non-native Brown trout (Salmo trutta) population.

== Hydrology and water quality ==
Because of the endangered species present and because the Lake Tahoe Basin comprises the headwaters of the Truckee River, the river has been the focus of several water quality investigations, the most detailed starting in the mid-1980s. Under the direction of the U.S. Environmental Protection Agency, a comprehensive dynamic hydrology transport model was developed by Earth Metrics Inc. The model's name was subsequently changed to DSSAM, and it was applied to analyze land use, and wastewater management decisions throughout the Truckee River Basin of 3,120 square miles (8,081 km^{2}) and to provide guidance in other U.S. river basins. Analytes addressed included nitrogen, reactive phosphate, dissolved oxygen, total dissolved solids and nine other parameters. Based on the use of the model, some decisions have been influenced to enhance riverine quality and aid the viability of associated biota. Impacts upon the receiving waters of Pyramid Lake were also analyzed. It is thought that dumping raw sewage into the Truckee River is a detriment to the water quality in several communities.

== See also ==
- List of rivers of California
- List of rivers of Nevada
- List of rivers in the Great Basin
- Upper Truckee River
- Carson River
- Beaver in the Sierra Nevada
