= Mount Lola =

Mountain in California, United States

- Location within California

Highest point
- Elevation: 9,147 ft (2,788 m) NAVD 88
- Prominence: 2,068 ft (630 m)
- Listing: California county high points 18th; Tahoe OGUL Star Peak
- Coordinates: 39°25′59″N 120°21′54″W

Geography
- Location: Nevada County, California, U.S.
- Parent range: Sierra Nevada
- Topo map: USGS Independence Lake

Climbing
- Easiest route: Simple scramble, class 1

Mount Lola is a mountain in the Sierra Nevada of California. Its summit, located north of Donner Pass and Interstate 80, is the highest point in Nevada County. It is also the highest point in the Sierra Nevada north of Interstate 80. A subsidiary peak 1.2 miles (1.9 km) north of the main summit is highest point in Sierra County at 8,848 feet (2,697 m) NAVD 88.

The area receives copious snowfall during the winter because of its high elevation.

The Mount Lola is named for Lola Montez, a famous resident of Nevada County, who lived in Grass Valley in the 1850s.

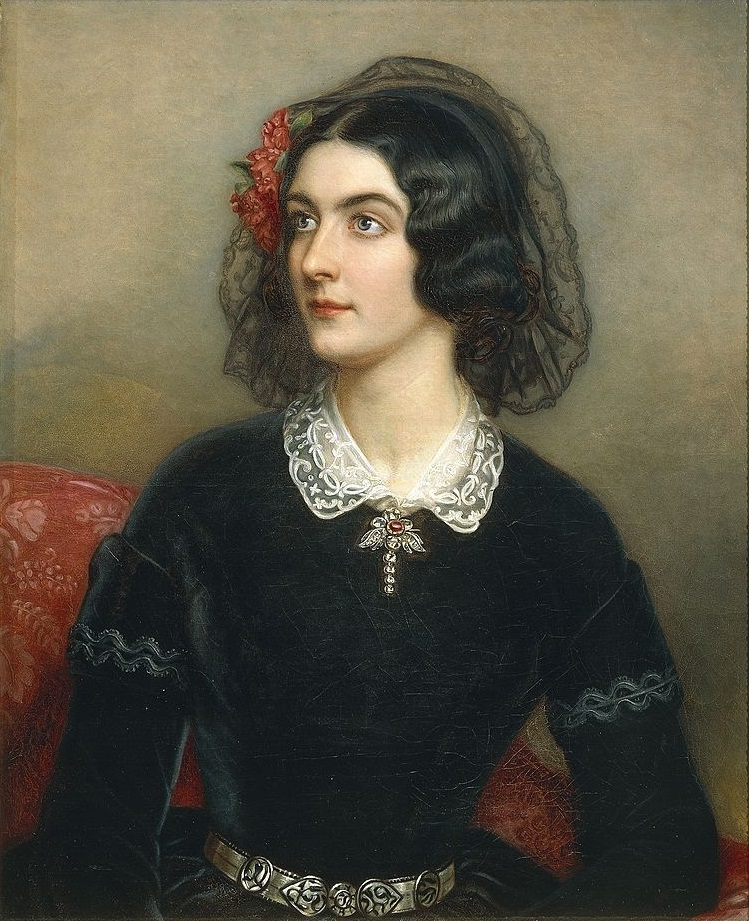
Portrait of Lola Montez by Joseph Karl Stieler, 1847.

== See also ==
- List of highest points in California by county
