= Prosser (surname) =

Prosser is an English-language surname, derived from a Welsh-language patronym.

== Origin ==
The English-language surname Prosser is considered to be a Welsh surname. The name originated as an Anglicisation of the Welsh-language ap Rhosier, or ap Rosser, both meaning son of Roger.

The English-language personal name Roger is derived from the Old French personal name Roger, Rogier. This personal name is of Germanic origin, derived from the elements hrōd ("fame") and gār, gēr ("spear"). The Old French name was adopted by the Normans, and was introduced into Britain by them in the Middle Ages (replacing the Old English cognate Hrōðgār). The name became one of the most popular masculine names in the Middle Ages, and lost popularity afterwards.

Until the Tudor period Welsh names generally took the format X son of Y, or X daughter of Y. The Old Welsh word for son was map, but it lenited to fap (today fab), then ap. Although some of the Welsh gentry began to adopt the English fashion for hereditary surnames even before the Act of Union between England and Wales in 1536, in general the Act marked the beginning of a gradual shift towards hereditary surnames in Wales that was not complete until the 18th century. In some cases ap was merged into the following personal name to create an hereditary name. So Ap Richard became Pritchard, ap Even became Bevan and ap Hugh emerged as Pugh. The shift from ap Rosser to Prosser is of this pattern, though the surname Rosser also occurs. The distribution of Prosser and Rosser in 1842-46 was strongly centred in south-east Wales, and largely absent from other parts of Wales.

A variant of the surname uses a second O rather than the E, ie Prossor. Historically most Prossors are found in Co Dublin, Co Tipperary and Co Cork. Many of the family in the 18th and 19th centuries were food merchants, exporting food in particular to the British Royal Navy in Portsmouth.

Early examples of the surname include:

- 1529 Richard ap Rosser was a party to two deeds relating to 'a mansion place called the Van' in Senghenydd.
- 1556 Morgan Lewis ap Rosser was a party to a grant of land in Llywell, Co. Brecon.

== Name distribution ==
There are various sources for surname maps charting the geographic distribution of surnames.

=== England and Wales ===
Ancestry.com's distribution map, based on their data from the 1891 England and Wales Census, shows Prossers were strongly present in southeast Wales and the western counties of England. Particularly high concentrations were in the Welsh historic counties of Glamorgan and Monmouthshire and the English county of Herefordshire.

=== Germany ===
German Prossers are primarily found in southern Germany.

=== Italy ===
The Italian Gens Project shows there are a small number of Prossers living in Italy. Their distribution map results show that the Prossers are concentrated in the northernmost province, Alto Adige/Südtirol.

=== United States ===
Current distribution maps from the Gens Project in the United States based on the 2000 US census demonstrate that the name is most common in eight states: California, Florida, Georgia, Illinois, New York, Ohio, Pennsylvania, and South Carolina, while still numbering less than a thousand individuals in each of those states.

Ancestry.com has a surname map for the name's distribution according to the United States Census for 1920. At that time, the name Prosser was most common in six states: California, Illinois, New York, Ohio, Pennsylvania, and South Carolina, with a total of 93–183 Prosser households in each state. Using data based on 142 Prosser immigrants to New York, the vast majority departed from Great Britain, while 11 are from Ireland and 21 from Germany.

== Notable people with the surname Prosser ==
- Adrian Prosser (1956–2024), Canadian cyclist
- Anna Weed Prosser (1846–1902), American evangelist; daughter of Erastus
- Beverly Prosser Gelwick (1932–2023), American psychologist
- Bob Prosser (born 1943), Welsh rugby player
- Charles A. Prosser (1871–1952), American educator
- Dai Prosser (1912–1973), Welsh rugby player
- David Prosser (bishop) (1868–1950), Welsh bishop, Archbishop of Wales
- David Prosser Jr. (1942–2024), American jurist and politician from Wisconsin
- Erastus S. Prosser (1809–1887), American politician from New York
- Gabriel Prosser (1776–1800), American rebel slave in Virginia
- Geoff Prosser (born 1948), Australian politician
- George Henry Prosser (1867–1941), Australian businessman and politician
- Glyn Prosser (1907–1972), Welsh rugby player
- Gwyn Prosser (born 1943), British politician
- Halley H. Prosser (1870–1921), American politician from Michigan
- Hugh Prosser (1900–1952), American film actor
- Ian Prosser (born 1943), British businessman
- Ian Prosser (florist) (born 1957), Scottish-born American florist
- Inez Beverly Prosser (1897–1934), American teacher and school administrator
- Joseph Prosser (1828–1867), Irish recipient of the Victoria Cross
- Julien Prosser (born 1972), Australian beach volleyball player
- Keith Prosser, (1897–1954), Bishop of Burnley
- Luke Prosser (born 1988), English footballer
- Margaret Prosser, Baroness Prosser (born 1937), British peer and politician
- Mrs. Prosser (1807–1882), British sentimental author
- Patrick Prosser (born 1952), Scottish computer scientist
- Ray Prosser (1927–2020), Welsh rugby player
- Richard Prosser (priest) (1748–1839), English priest
- Richard Bissell Prosser (1838–1918), English patent examiner and biographical writer
- Richard Prosser (1967–2022), New Zealand politician
- Roy Prosser (1942–2008), Australian rugby player
- Seward Prosser (1871–1942), American banker and philanthropist
- Skip Prosser (1950–2007), American basketball coach
- Stuart Prosser (1887–1939), Welsh rugby player
- William Prosser, Lord Prosser (1934–2015), Scottish judge
- William Farrand Prosser (1834–1911), American politician
- William Henry Prosser (1870–1952), Welsh cricketer
- William Lloyd Prosser (1898–1972), American legal scholar

== See also ==
- Prodger
- Prosser (disambiguation)
- Rosser (disambiguation)
- Wegg-Prosser
