= Rosser (surname) =

Rosser is a surname. Notable people with the surname include:

- Arthur Rosser (1864–1954), Welsh-born New Zealand builder, politician and trade unionist
- Bill Rosser (1927–2002), Aboriginal Australian author and activist who wrote about Palm Island, Queensland
- Celia Rosser (born 1930), Australian botanical illustrator
- Dois I. Rosser Jr. (1921–2019), American businessman
- Eric Franklin Rosser (born 1952), American former keyboardist and convicted child pornographer
- Hamish Rosser (born 1974), Australian drummer
- J. Allyn Rosser (born 1957), American poet
- J. Barkley Rosser (1907–1989), American logician and mathematician
- J. Barkley Rosser Jr. (1948–2023), American economist, son of the above
- Joseph Rosser (fl. 1853–1860), American politician
- Khallifah Rosser (born 1995), American hurdler
- Mel Rosser (1901–1988), Welsh dual-code international rugby player
- Richard Rosser, Baron Rosser (born 1944), British former trade union leader and Labour politician
- Ronald E. Rosser (1929–2020), United States Army Medal of Honor recipient
- Susan Rosser, British biologist
- Tania Rosser (born 1978), New Zealand-born Irish rugby union player
- Thomas L. Rosser (1836–1910), American Civil War Confederate general and Spanish–American War United States Army brigadier general of volunteers

== See also ==
- Martin Rossor, British clinical neurologist
