= Donner Camp =

Donner Camp may refer to any campsite used by the Donner Party, including:

- Alder Creek, site of the smaller Donner Party camp during the winter of 1846–1847, sometimes referred to as the Donner Family Camp
- Donner Memorial State Park, site of the larger Donner Party camp during the winter of 1846–1847; the sites two of the three cabins used during the winter are located in the state park
