= Rosser =

Rosser may refer to:

== People ==
- Rosser Evans (1867–?), Welsh international rugby union half-back
- Arthur Rosser (1864–1954), New Zealand builder, local-body politician and trade unionist
- Mel Rosser (1901–1988), Welsh international rugby centre
- Richard Rosser, Baron Rosser (born 1944), British former trade union leader and Labour politician
- Susan Rosser, British professor of synthetic biology
- Tania Rosser (born 1978), New Zealand-born Irish rugby union player

=== Americans ===
- Rosser Reeves (1910–1984), American advertising executive
- Dois I. Rosser Jr. (1921–2019), American businessman
- Eric Franklin Rosser (born 1952), American former keyboardist and convicted child pornographer
- J. Allyn Rosser (born 1957), American poet
- J. Barkley Rosser (1907–1989), American logician
- J. Barkley Rosser Jr. (1948–2023), American mathematical economist
- Joseph Rosser, American politician
- Khallifah Rosser (born 1995), American hurdler
- Ronald E. Rosser (1929–2020), American soldier
- Thomas L. Rosser (1836–1910), Confederate major general during the American Civil War

=== Australians ===
- Bill Rosser (1927–2002), Australian author and union organiser from Palm Island, Queensland
- Celia Rosser (born 1930), Australian botanical illustrator
- Hamish Rosser (born 1974), Australian rock musician

== Places ==
- Rosser Ridge, Antarctic rock ridge
- Rosser, Texas, American village
- Rural Municipality of Rosser, in Manitoba, Canada

== Other ==
- Rosser International, architectural and engineering firm

== See also ==
- Prosser (disambiguation)
- Martin Rossor, British clinical neurologist
