= Prodger =

Prodger is a surname of Welsh origin. It is an anglicisation of the name ap Rosier, literally "son of Roger". Notable people with the surname include:

- Charlotte Prodger (born 1974), British video artist
- John Prodger (born 1935), English cricketer
- Matt Prodger, British journalist
- Phillip Prodger (born 1967), British museum curator and art historian

== See also ==
- George Prodgers (1891–1935), Canadian ice hockey player
- Prosser (name)
