= Charles L. Chase =

American politician

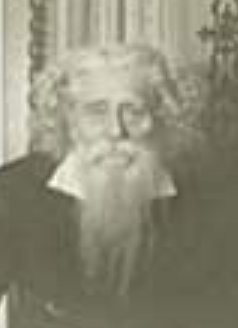
- Chase in old age

Member of the Minnesota House of Representatives from the 11th district
- In office January 4, 1876 – January 1, 1877

Acting Governor of the Minnesota Territory
- In office October 13, 1857 – May 24, 1858
- Preceded by: Office Established
- Succeeded by: Henry Hastings Sibley (as Governor)

4th Secretary of the Minnesota Territory
- In office April 23, 1857 – May 24, 1858
- Preceded by: Joseph Rosser
- Succeeded by: Office abolished

Personal details
- Born: 1826 New York, U.S.
- Died: April 20, 1895 (aged 68–69) Ionia, Michigan, U.S.
- Profession: Politician, farmer

Charles L. "C.L." Chase (1826 – April 20, 1895) was an American politician and farmer who served as the fourth and final secretary of Minnesota Territory from 1857 to 1858. He subsequently served in the Minnesota House of Representatives from 1876 to 1877, representing the 11th legislative district of Minnesota in the 18th Minnesota Legislature.

== Early life ==
Chase was born in New York around the year 1828.

Chase came to the Territory of Minnesota in 1856.

== Career ==
Chase served as the fourth and final secretary of Minnesota Territory from April 23, 1857 to May 24, 1858.

On October 13, 1857, an election was held to approve the constitution of the State of Minnesota. Assuming the constitution would come into effect almost immediately, state offices were elected simultaneously, although none actually took office. Henry Hastings Sibley was elected governor, however could not be sworn in as the state constitution was not in effect. Chase declared himself as acting Governor, despite technically holding no constitutional authority. The actual territorial governor, Samuel Medary, spent large amounts of time out of state, leaving Chase free to carry out his business as acting governor. Most of the 124 pieces of legislation passed in preparation for statehood was passed into law by Chase, not Medary. During this time, Chase signed documentation under both the titles of Acting Governor, and Secretary.

Chase was elected to the Minnesota Constitutional Convention of 1857 from the 3rd district. He served in this position from July 13, 1857 to August 29, 1857.

Chase served in the Minnesota House of Representatives from 1876 to 1877, representing the 11th legislative district of Minnesota in the 18th Minnesota Legislature.

During his time in office, Chase served on the following committees. He chaired the Commerce committee.

- Claims
- Commerce
- Public Lands

Chase's time in office began on January 4, 1876 and concluded on January 1, 1877. His district included representation for Dodge County.

Outside of the Minnesota Legislature, Chase was a farmer.

== Personal life ==
Chase was married. He resided in Concord, Minnesota.

Political offices
Preceded by Joseph Rosser	4th Secretary of Minnesota Territory; 1857–1858	Succeeded by Office abolished
Preceded by Samuel Medary; As Territorial Governor	Acting Governor of Minnesota; 1857-1858	Succeeded by Henry Hastings Sibley; As State Governor
Minnesota House of Representatives
Preceded by —	Member of the Minnesota House of Representatives from the 11th district 1876–1877	Succeeded by —
