= Prosser =

Prosser may refer to:

== Places ==
United States

- Prosser, California, a former settlement
- Prosser Creek, California
- Prosser, Nebraska, a village
- Prosser, Washington, a city

Australia

- Electoral division of Prosser, Tasmania
- Prosser Bay, Tasmania
- Prosser River, Tasmania

== High schools ==
- Prosser Career Academy, a vocational high school in Chicago, Illinois
- Charles Allen Prosser School of Technology, a vocational high school in New Albany, Indiana
- Prosser High School, Prosser, Washington

== People ==
- Prosser (surname), a surname and a list of people so named
- Prosser Gifford (1929–2020), American historian, author and academic administrator

== Fictional characters ==
- Brian Prosser, a supporting character in the BBC TV series Hinterland
- L. Prosser, a minor antagonist in The Hitchhiker's Guide to the Galaxy
- Maxwell Prosser, the main character of the indie video game Ironclad Tactics
- Oofy Prosser, a recurring character in P. G. Wodehouse stories
- Sydney Prosser, in the 2013 film American Hustle, played by Amy Adams

== Other uses ==
- Prosser Twin Cylinder Car Company, a 19th-century American railroad freight car manufacturer

== See also ==
- Prosser Limestone, a geologic formation in Illinois, United States
- Rosser (disambiguation)
