= Alder Creek (Nevada County, California) =

Stream in California, USA

Alder Creek Tributary to Prosser Creek
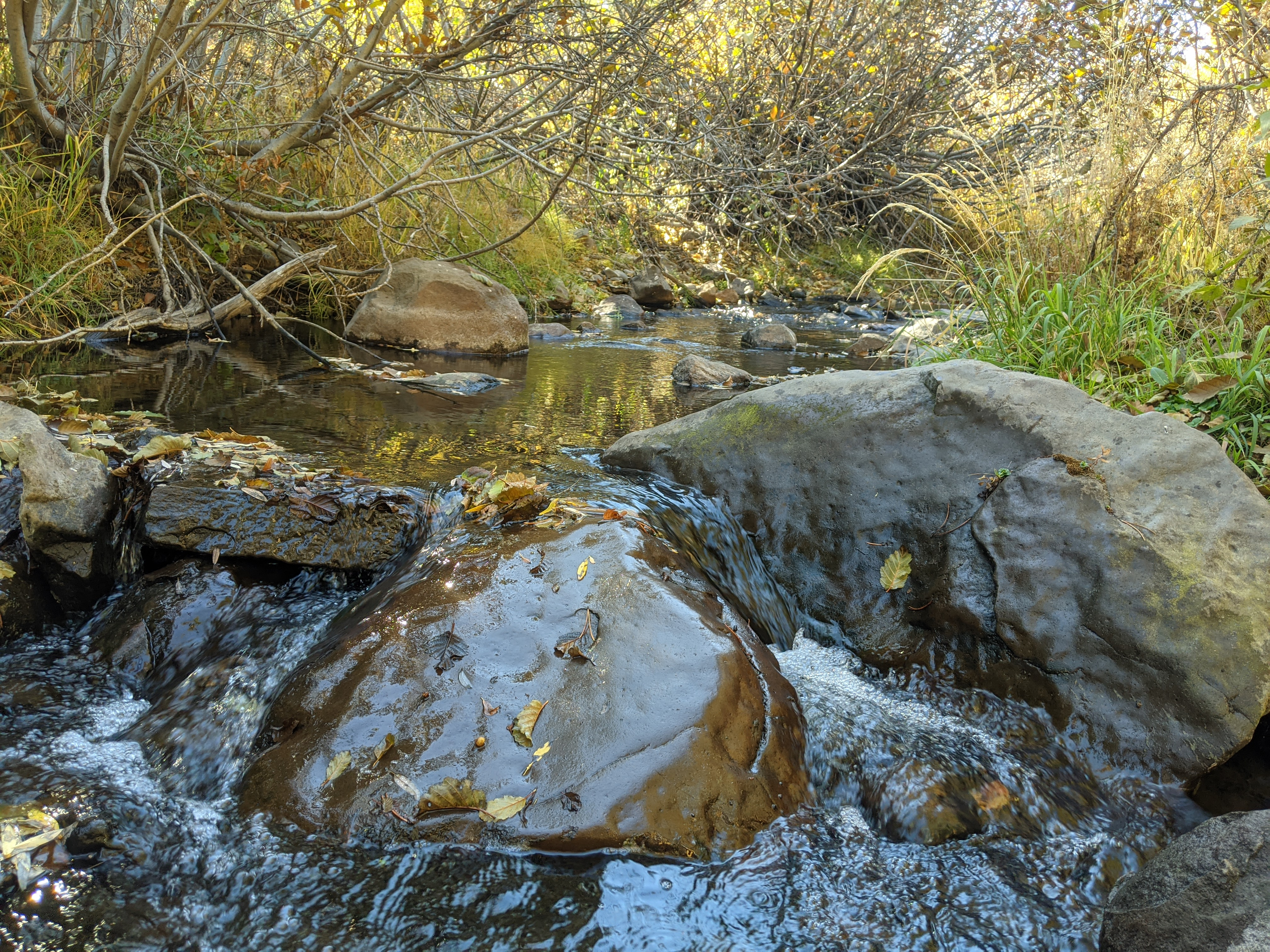
- Alder Creek just below Fjord Road, Truckee

- Location of Alder Creek mouth Alder Creek (Nevada County, California) (the United States)

Location
- Country: United States
- State: California
- County: Nevada

Physical characteristics
- Source: Negro Canyon divide
  - location: Donner Ridge
  - coordinates: 39°22′59″N 120°37′34″W
  - elevation: 7,490 ft (2,280 m)
- Mouth: Prosser Creek
  - location: Prosser Creek Reservoir, about 2 miles north-northwest of Polaris, California
  - coordinates: 39°22′39″N 120°38′42″W
  - elevation: 5,741 ft (1,750 m)
- Length: 8.89 mi (14.31 km)
- Basin size: 12.65 square miles (32.8 km^{2})
- Discharge
  - location: Prosser Creek
  - average: 15.55 cu ft/s (0.440 m^{3}/s) at mouth with Prosser Creek

Basin features
- Progression: Prosser Creek → Truckee River → Pyramid Lake
- River system: Truckee River
- Tributaries
  - left: unnamed tributaries
  - right: unnamed tributaries
- Bridges: Skislope Way, Snowpeak Way, Fjord Road, Schussing Way, Alder Creek Road, CA 89

Alder Creek is a perennial stream in Nevada County, California, mostly within the town of Truckee. Its source region near Donner Ridge is west of town, and its mouth at Prosser Creek Reservoir is north of town. It flows to the Truckee River via Prosser Creek.

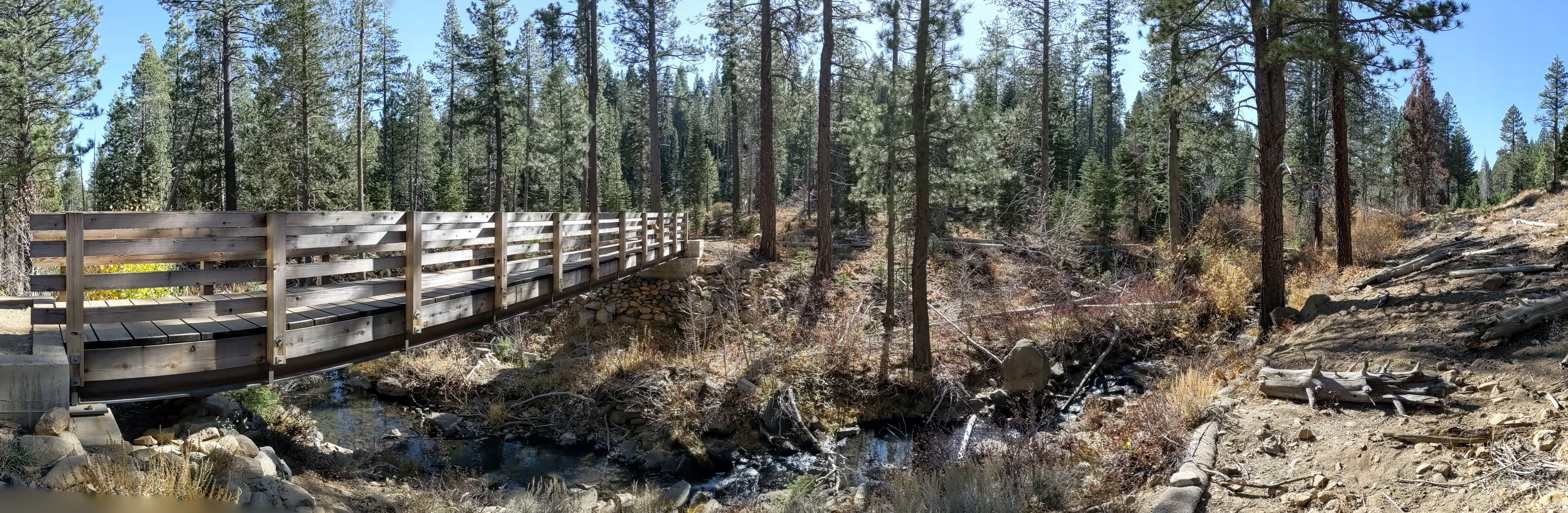
Alder Creek panoramic view at Emigrant Trail footbridge
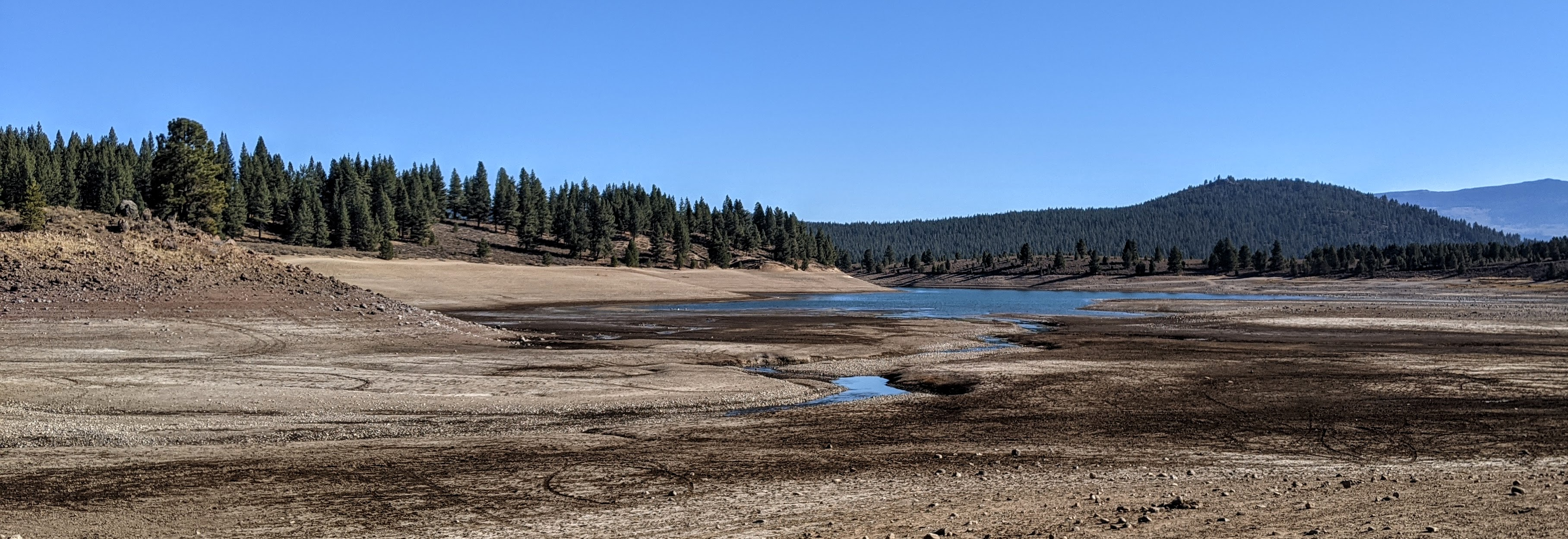
Alder Creek debouches into Prosser Creek Reservoir, at a location depending on the reservoir level, which is low here in October, 2020.

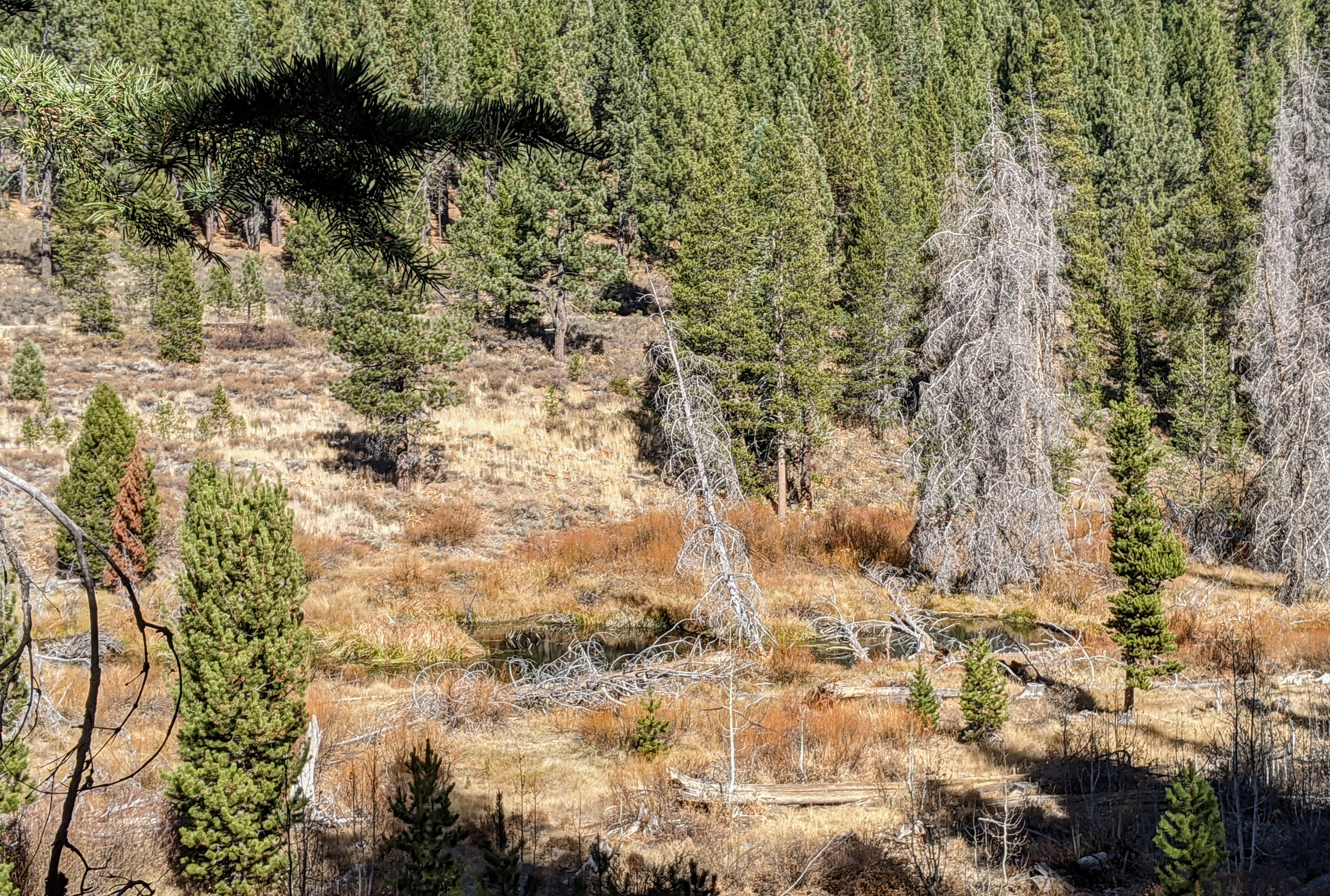
A beaver pond on Alder Creek

== Donner Party Camp ==
As snowstorms stranded the Donner Party in the Sierra Nevada during 1846, two camps were established where they would attempt to survive the winter. At Alder Creek Valley, a smaller group—including the Donner families—would settle in tents for the season. They had been stopped in the area to repair a broken wagon axle, after which George Donner injured himself making the repairs, and they were snowed in before they could move any further. The larger portion of the wagon party had traveled approximately 6 miles (9.7 km) further up the trail before the storm moved in, and established their camp near Truckee Lake (now known as Donner Lake), currently the site of Donner Memorial State Park

On October 16, 1960, a marker memorializing the Donner Camp at Alder Creek was embedded into a large stone boulder at what was believed to be their campsite. Shortly after, a picnic area was developed at the site by Tahoe National Forest, as part of the nearby Prosser Creek Reservoir project. This is located off California route 89, just north of the creek.

Preparatory to enhancements of the picnic area, a major archaeological excavation of the site took place in summer 1990. The excavation focused primarily on an area surrounding a 500-year-old ponderosa pine with a fire-scarred base, believed to be where George Donner hastily erected shelter for his family (this is also the location of the 1960 memorial plaque). The excavation failed to reveal any artifacts from the Donner period at the tree site. However, towards the end of the excavation, metal detectors were brought in and two other sites in the area, yielding artifacts from the appropriate period, were discovered. Excavations in 1992 examined these sites more thoroughly.

1996 memorial plaques

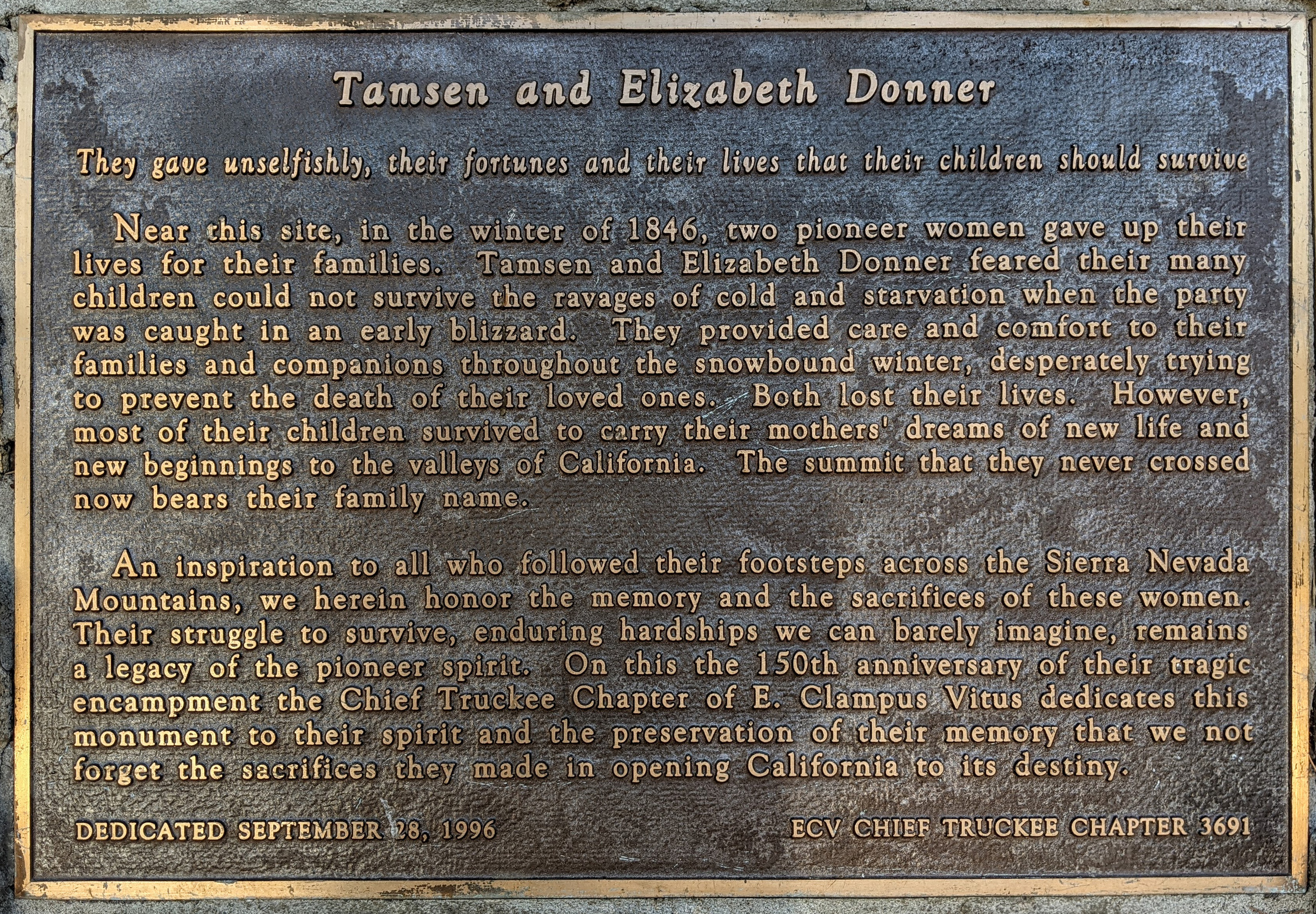
Plaque about the Donner women at the Alder Creek camp

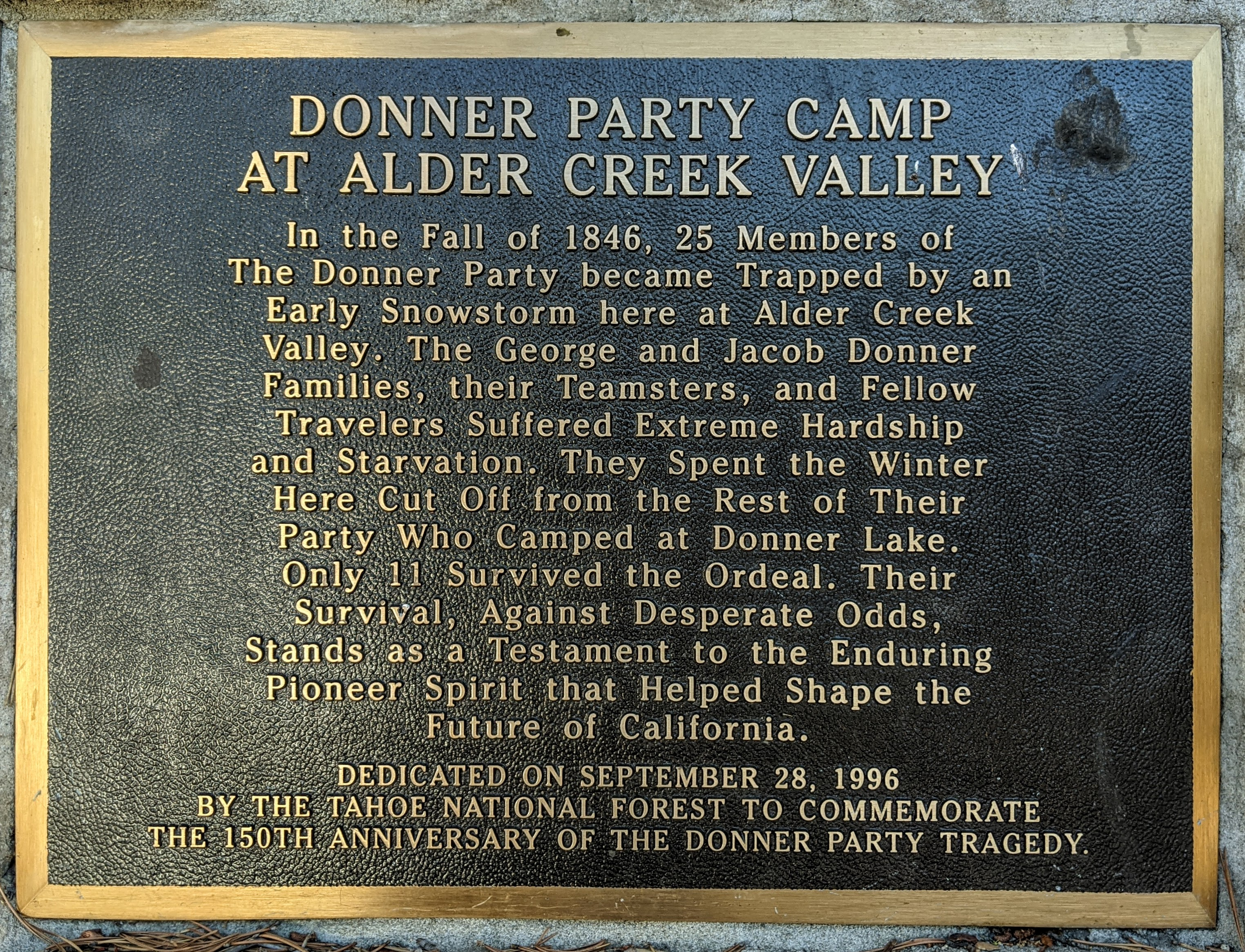
Donner Party camp plaque, at the Alder Creek camp

New interpretive signs and memorial markers were added to the site as part of the sesquicentennial remembrance of the Donner Party during a gathering on September 28, 1996. Additional archaeological excavations took place at the Donner Camp near Alder Creek during the early 2000s, and were noted for being unable to find any evidence of cannibalism at the site.
