= Indiana Military Museum =

- Location within Indiana
- Established: 1982
- Location: Vincennes, Indiana
- Coordinates: 38.673°N 87.538°W
- Type: Military museum
- Founder: Jim R. Osborne
- Website: www.indianamilitarymuseum.com

The Indiana Military Museum is a military museum located in Vincennes, Indiana.

== History ==
=== Background ===
Jim R. Osborne began collecting surplus military equipment as a child after his neighbor gave him a collection of German equipment he had taken as war trophies. In the late 1960s, he started acquiring land vehicles as well.

=== Establishment ===
At the urging of friends, the Indiana Military Museum was founded by Osborne in 1982 and opened to the public in 1984 on Bruceville Road east of Vincennes. A pair of buildings slated for demolition were moved to the property and were the museum's first buildings. The display space was further expanded in 1988 with the acquisition of a piece of a former Harold's grocery store. The museum completed the restoration of an LVT-4 in 1991. A major change came in the late 1990s, when the museum realized that it needed to focus on finding a new location. A number of objects were loaned to the Casino Aztar in Evansville, Indiana for a temporary exhibit in 2000. Shortly thereafter, the museum closed to undergo renovations supported by a grant from the Lilly Endowment.

=== Move ===
The museum purchased a site west of Vincennes close to the George Rogers Clark National Historical Park, where it reopened on 31 May 2013. It acquired A4D, F-16 and Lim-5R airplanes in 2015, a T-34 tank the following year and the sail of the submarine USS Indianapolis the year after that. The museum announced plans to complete a new 24,000 sq ft (2,200 m^{2}) exhibit hall in 2018. The expansion, reduced to 8,000 sq ft (740 m^{2}), opened the following year.

== Facilities ==
The museum is located on the 14-acre (0.057 km^{2}) site of the former Blackford Window Glass Company factory. Plans made at the time of the site's purchase call for the construction of a 56,000 sq ft (5,200 m^{2}) building. The museum also has a library.

== Exhibits ==
Exhibits include a memorial for the USS Grayback that was moved from the Heslar Naval Armory. Inside the museum, there are replicas of a 1940s home, the ruins of a French cathedral and a home front factory.

== Collection ==
=== Aircraft ===
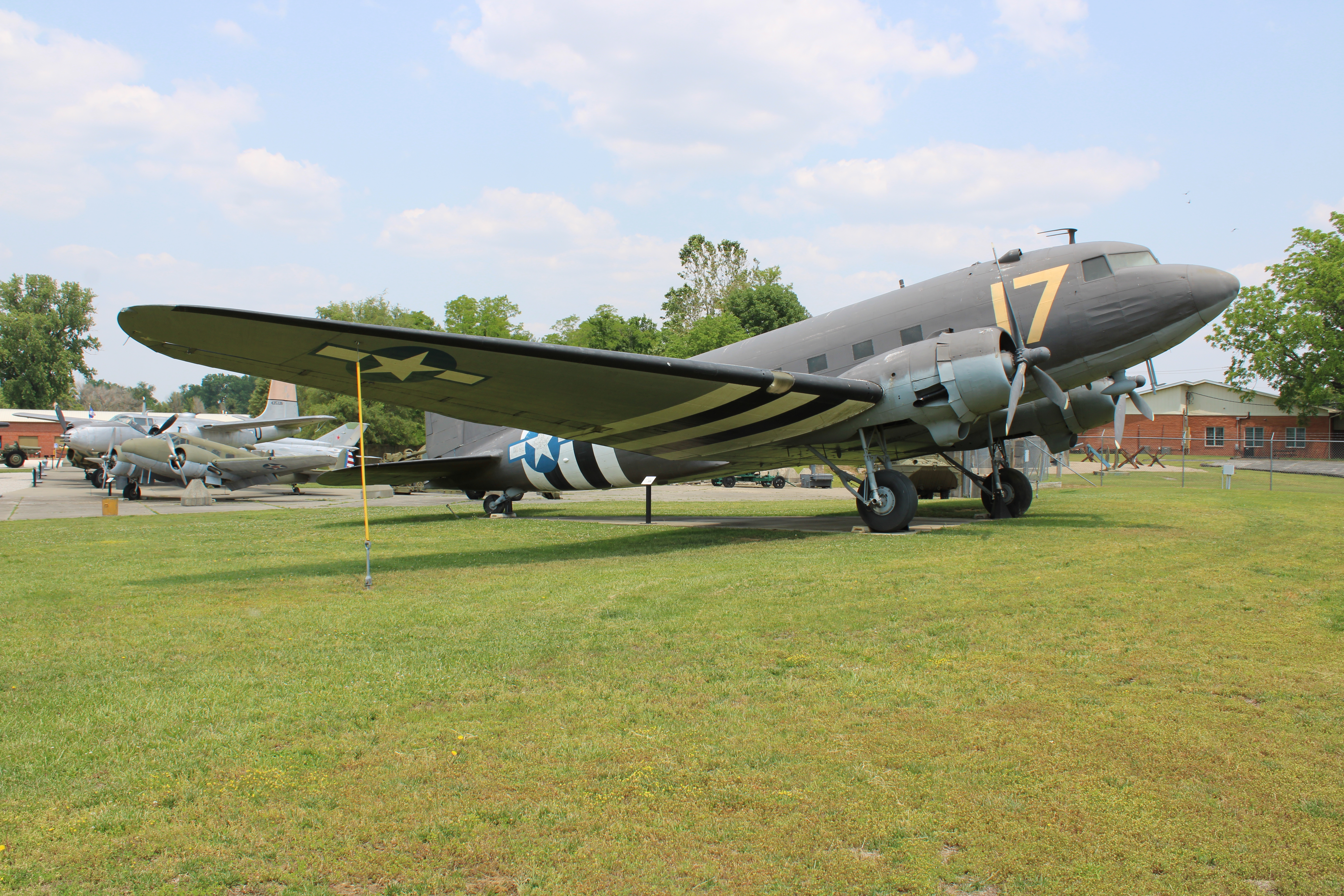
Douglas SC-47D Skytrain

- Beech UC-45J Expeditor
- Bell UH-1 Iroquois
- Boeing PT-17 Kaydet
- Douglas A4D-2 Skyhawk
- Douglas SC-47D Skytrain
- General Dynamics F-16A Fighting Falcon
- Lockheed T-33A
- Lockheed T-33B
- McDonnell F-4D Phantom II
- Mikoyan-Gurevich MiG-21
- On Mark Marketeer
- PZL TS-11 Iskra
- WSK-Mielec Lim-5R

=== Ground vehicles ===
- 2S1 Gvozdika
- M4 Sherman
- M47 Patton
- Sexton
- Type 95 Ha-Go light tank

=== Other ===
- Landing Craft Vehicle Personnel – post-World War II
- MGM-13B Mace

== Events ==
The museum holds a number of events in the spring and summer, including a reenactments of Civil War, World War I, World War II and Vietnam War battles.

== See also ==
- Motts Military Museum
- Russell Military Museum
