= Wegg-Prosser =

Notable people with the surname Wegg-Prosser include:

- Benjamin Wegg-Prosser (born 1974), British consultant and political adviser
- Charles Wegg-Prosser (1910–1996), British politician and solicitor
- Christine Wegg-Prosser (1914–2003), married Albert Hourani
- Dede Wegg-Prosser, musician, member of We Have Band
- Francis Wegg-Prosser (1824–1911), English politician and Roman Catholic convert
- Thomas Wegg-Prosser, musician, member of We Have Band

== See also ==
Prosser (surname)
