= Minnesota Territory =

U.S. Territory (1849–1858)

Coordinates: 46°N 97.4°W

Territory of Minnesota
- Organized incorporated territory of the United States
- 1849–1858
- Location of Minnesota Territory within the U.S., including current U.S. state boundaries
- Capital: St. Paul
- Government
  - Type: Organized incorporated territory
- Governor
  - 1849–1853: Alexander Ramsey
  - 1853–1857: Willis A. Gorman
  - 1857–1858: Samuel Medary
- Legislature: Minnesota Territorial Legislature
- History
  - Split from Iowa and Wisconsin territories: 3 March
  - Statehood: 11 May
Preceded by	Succeeded by
Iowa Territory; Wisconsin Territory	Minnesota; Unorganized territory

The Territory of Minnesota was an organized incorporated territory of the United States that existed from March 3, 1849, until May 11, 1858, when the eastern portion of the territory was admitted to the Union as the state of Minnesota and the western portion became unorganized territory and shortly after was reorganized as part of the Dakota Territory.

== History ==
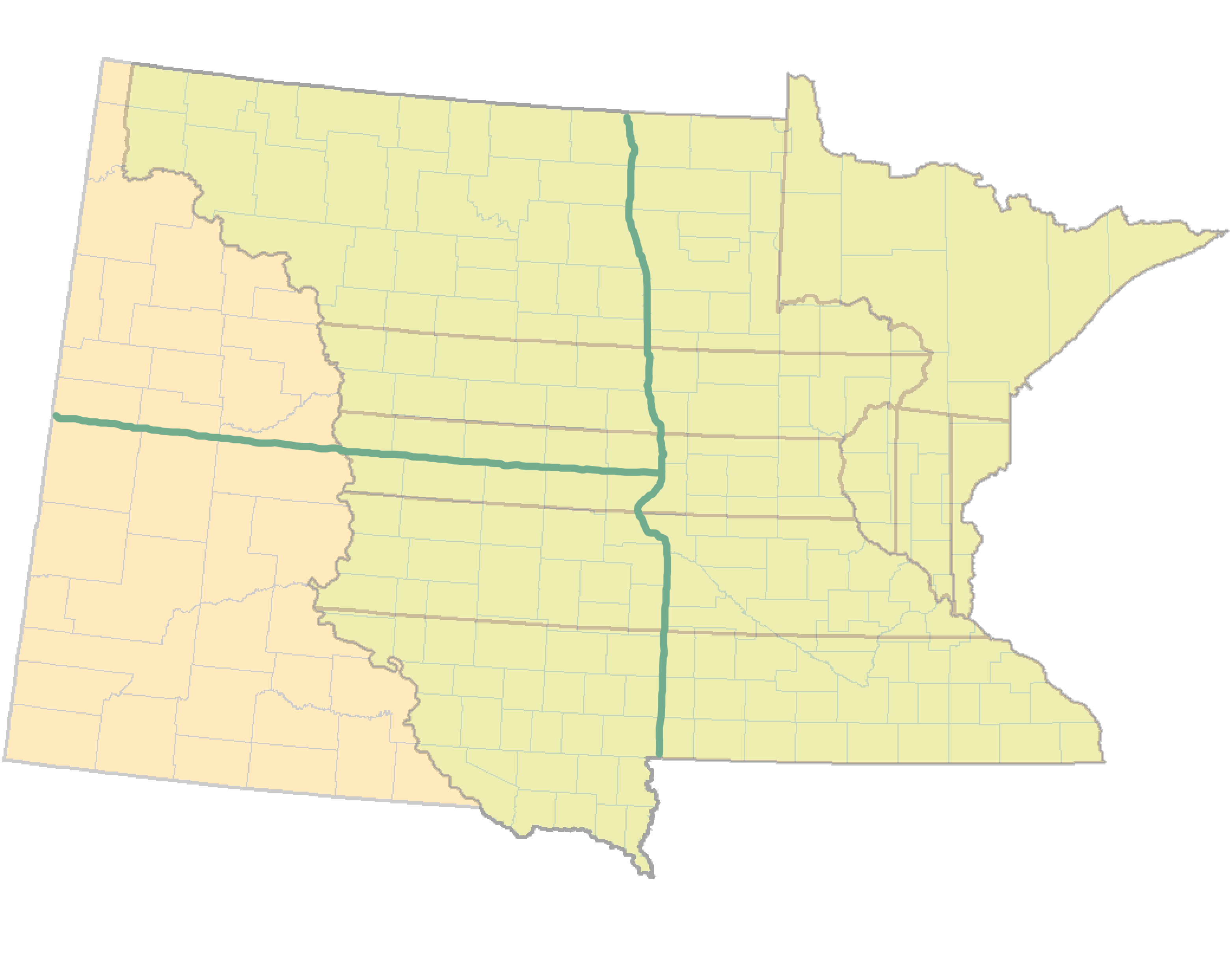
The nine original counties of the Minnesota Territory extended into what became North Dakota and South Dakota (left)

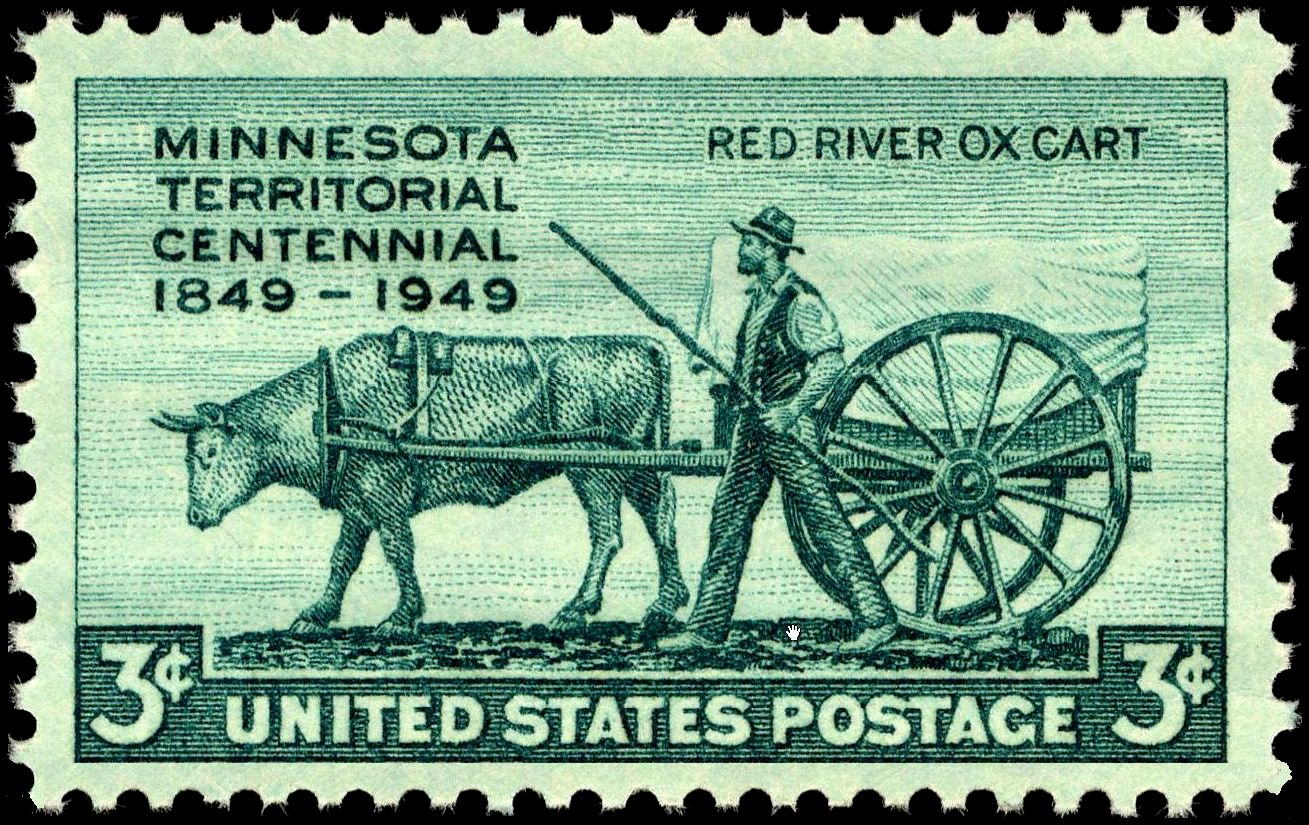
Minnesota Territory Centennial stamp, issued in 1949 in recognition of Minnesota's unique Métis oxcart traders.

The Minnesota Territory was formed on March 3, 1849, encompassing the entirety of the present-day state of Minnesota and the majority portions of modern-day North and South Dakota east of the Missouri and White Earth Rivers. At the time of formation there were an estimated 5,000 settlers living in the Territory. There were no roads from adjoining Wisconsin or Iowa. The easiest access to the region was via waterway, of which the Mississippi River was primary. The primary mode of transport was the riverboat.

Minnesota Territory had three significant pioneer settlements: St. Paul, St. Anthony/Minneapolis, and Stillwater, plus two military reservations: Fort Snelling and Fort Ripley. All of these were located on waterways. A reservation for the Winnebago people had been created at Long Prairie in 1848. The Chippewa Agency, at Crow Wing, was founded in 1852. The Upper and Lower Sioux Agencies were created in 1853. All of these were also located adjacent to waterways. The primary territorial institutions were in the three main settlements. St. Paul was made the territorial capital, Minneapolis was selected as the site of the University of Minnesota, and Stillwater was chosen for the Territorial Prison. The military reservations were federal land, of which the Fort Snelling Unorganized Territory still exists. Fort Ripley is now part of Minnesota National Guard's Camp Ripley. The first school in the Territory was located at Fort Snelling, as was the first Post Office. The first justice of the peace in Minnesota was at Mendota, as was the first church, St. Peter's Catholic Church, which was built in 1840.

The first territorial governor, Alexander Ramsey, requested that Congress approve funds for five military roads in the Territory: Mendota/Fort Snelling to the confluence of the Big Sioux River with the Missouri River; Point Douglas to Fort Ripley; Fort Ripley Road/Swan River to Long Prairie Indian Agency; and Point Douglas to Superior. A budget was approved in 1850 for four of these roads, with the Point Douglas–Fort Ripley Military Road being the first. Additional funds were later appropriated for a survey of the route to the Big Sioux/Missouri, the Fort Ridgely and South Pass Wagon Road and the Wagon Road from Fort Ripley to Fort Abercrombie. Private trails were cut as well, the most well known of which was Dodd Road from 1853. It was named after its builder, Captain William B. Dodd, and significant portions of it still exist.

When the region was still part of the Wisconsin Territory, the Red River Trails were further developed by Joe Rolette. There were three main trails, now identified as the West Plains Trail, East Plains Trail, and Woods Trails. They connected Fort Garry and the Selkirk Settlement in British North America with Fort Snelling and the American Fur Trading Company at Mendota. Later, the Oxcarts became synonymous with St. Paul's Kellogg Street and the riverboat landing on the Mississippi River. Fort Ripley lay along the East Plains Trail.

In 1850, 10 years after the end of the Second Great Awakening (1790–1840), of the three churches with regular services in the Minnesota Territory, 1 was Methodist, 1 was Presbyterian, and 1 was Catholic. The Roman Catholic diocese of Saint Paul of Minnesota was established by Pope Pius IX on July 19, 1850, and consisted of the entirety of the Minnesota Territory. Because of this original territorial designation, to this day the Archdiocese of Saint Paul and Minneapolis continues to oversee the Catholic dioceses in the Dakotas within its ecclesiastical province.

In the 1850 United States census, the nine counties in the Minnesota Territory reported the following population counts:

Rank	County	Population
1	Ramsey	2,227
2	Kittson	1,134
3	Washington	1,056
4	Dakota	584
5	Benton	418
6	Wabasha	243
7	Wahnata	160
8	Mahkahta	158
9	Itasca	97
	Minnesota Territory	6,077

=== Statehood ===
In December of 1856, Henry Mower Rice began the legal process of granting statehood to Minnesota. The state admittance of Minnesota as the State of Minnesota came into effect on May 24, 1858. State offices were elected on October 13, 1857. In the time between the election and statehood, Territorial Secretary Charles L. Chase declared himself acting Governor to fill in for the mostly absent Territorial Governor Samuel Medary.

== Territorial Governors ==
#	Governor	Took office	Left office	Party
1	Alexander Ramsey	June 1, 1849	May 15, 1853	Whig
2	Willis Arnold Gorman	May 15, 1853	April 23, 1857	Democratic
3	Samuel Medary	April 23, 1857	May 24, 1858	Democratic
--	Charles L. Chase (Acting)	October 13, 1857	May 24, 1858	Democratic

== Territorial Secretaries ==
- Charles K. Smith, 1849–1851
- Alexander Wilkin, 1851–1853
- Joseph Rosser, 1853–1857
- Charles L. Chase, 1857–1858

== Territorial Attorneys General ==
- Lorenzo A. Babcock, 1849–1853
- Lafayette Emmett, 1853–1858

== Congressional Delegates ==
- Henry Hastings Sibley, 31st Congress, 32nd Congress, 1849–1853
- Henry Mower Rice, 33rd Congress, 34th Congress, 1853–1857
- William W. Kingsbury, 35th Congress, 1857–1858

== See also ==
- John Catlin
- Historic regions of the United States
- History of Minnesota
- Interior Plains
- Territorial evolution of the United States
- Territory of Dakota, 1861–1889
