= Motts Military Museum =

- Location within Ohio
- Established: 1987
- Location: Groveport, Ohio
- Coordinates: 39.859°N 82.887°W
- Type: Military museum
- Founder: Warren E. Motts
- Website: www.mottsmilitarymuseuminc.com

The Motts Military Museum is a military museum located in Groveport, Ohio.

== History ==
The museum was founded in 1987 by Warren E. Motts in his family home. However, by 1995, the museum announced plans to move to a new location with a 3,500 sq ft (330 m^{2}) building.

After initially attempting to purchase and move Eddie Rickenbacker's Home to the museum in 1996, the museum constructed a replica four years later. The same year, the museum received an M47 Patton tank from Arnold Schwarzenegger. The museum broke ground on a 5,200 sq ft (480 m^{2}) expansion in 2001 and completed it in 2006.

In 2012, the museum acquired a fire truck that was damaged in the September 11th attacks. It received funding from the state to build a shelter for its landing craft in 2015.

== Exhibits ==
Exhibits include the Ohio Military Hall of Fame, the Ohio Mobile Vietnam Memorial wall and the Vietnam War Dog Team Memorial.

== Collection ==
=== Aircraft ===
- Bell AH-1F Cobra
- Bell UH-1 Iroquois
- Douglas R4D-7
- Hughes OH-6A Cayuse
- LTV A-7 Corsair II

=== Ground vehicles ===
- Ambulance
- M47 Patton

=== Other ===
- Landing Craft Vehicle Personnel – post-World War II

== See also ==
- Indiana Military Museum
- Ronald E. Rosser – member of the advisory board
- Russell Military Museum
