= Russell Military Museum =

Military museum in Russell, Illinois, US

- Location within Illinois
- Former name: Kenosha Military Museum
- Established: 1986
- Location: Russell, Illinois
- Coordinates: 42.492°N 87.951°W
- Type: Military museum
- Founder: Mark Sonday
- Website: www.russellmilitarymuseum.com

The Russell Military Museum, originally begun as the Kenosha Military Museum is a military museum located in Russell, Illinois.

== History ==
Mark Sonday began collecting surplus military equipment in the 1970s. In 1980, he purchased 11 former American tanks from Israel. He also joined a group of collectors which provided props for movies such as First Blood, Courage Under Fire and Saving Private Ryan.

The Kenosha Military Museum opened in 1989 in the former town of Bristol, Wisconsin. Ten years after establishment, Sonday announced plans for a new building and requested a corresponding zoning change for the property. The change failed to pass a vote, due to the petitions of the adjacent property owners. The museum then filed a lawsuit against the county. In 2002, Kenosha County used eminent domain to reclaim the land on which it sat.

A settlement was reached in 2006, in which the museum received a $3.9 million payment, but was forced to vacate the property. It moved across the state line to a new site with a 15,000 sq ft (1,400 m^{2}) building in Russell, Illinois, where it was renamed the Russell Military Museum.

== Collection ==
=== Aircraft ===
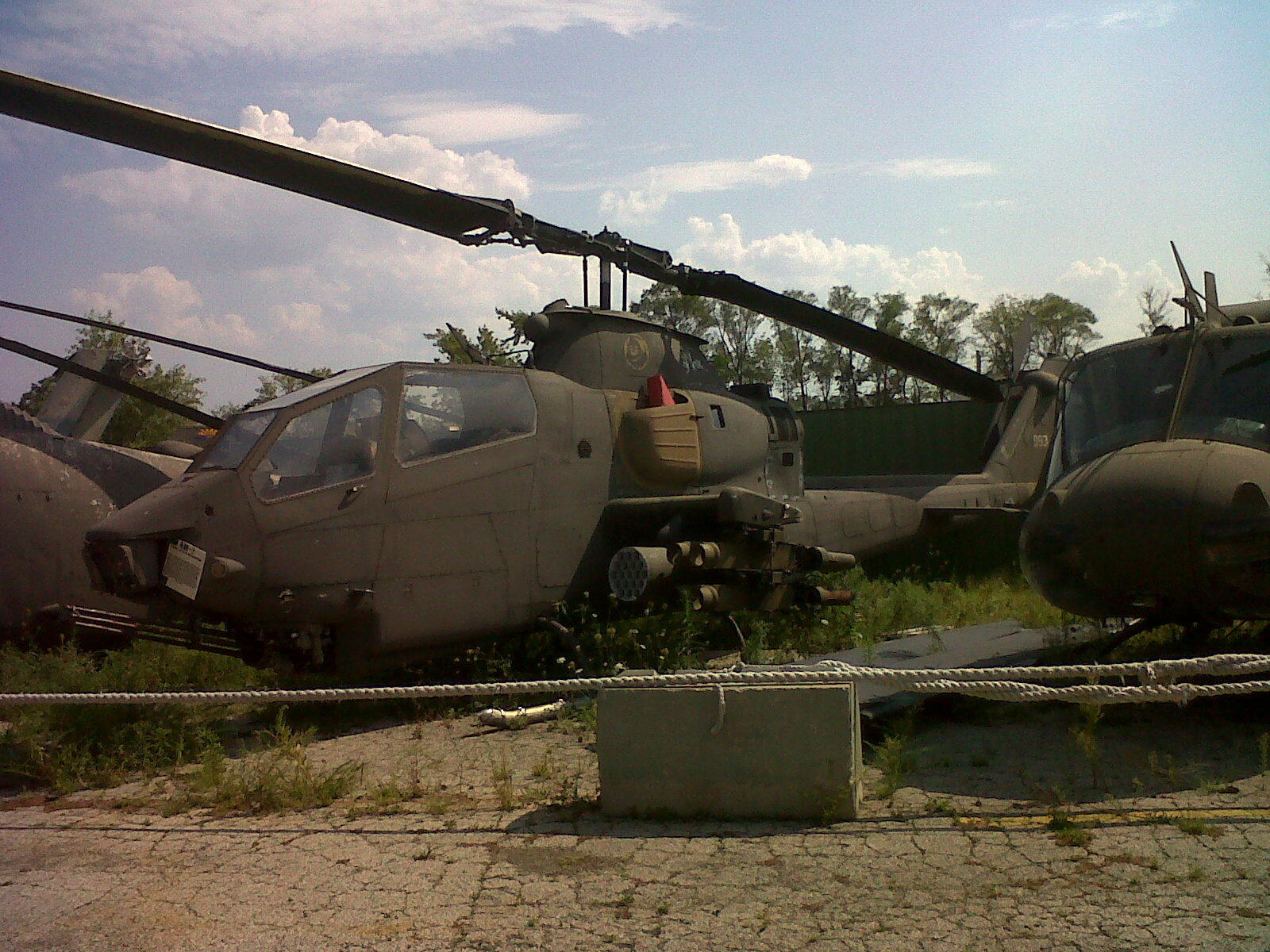
Bell AH-1 Cobra

- Aero Commander U-9
- Bell AH-1 Cobra
- Bell OH-58 Kiowa
- Bell UH-1B Iroquois
- Bell UH-1H Iroquois
- Fairchild Republic A-10 Thunderbolt II
- General Dynamics F-16 Fighting Falcon
- Grumman OV-1 Mohawk
- Gyrodyne QH-50 DASH
- Hiller H-23 Raven
- Hughes OH-6 Cayuse
- Hughes TH-55A Osage
- Lockheed T-33
- LTV A-7 Corsair II
- McDonnell Douglas F-15 Eagle
- Mil Mi-24
- Northrop T-38 Talon
- Republic F-84 Thunderjet
- Sikorsky CH-34 Choctaw
- Sikorsky CH-53 Sea Stallion
- Sikorsky CH-54 Tarhe
- Sikorsky HH-3

=== Ground vehicles ===
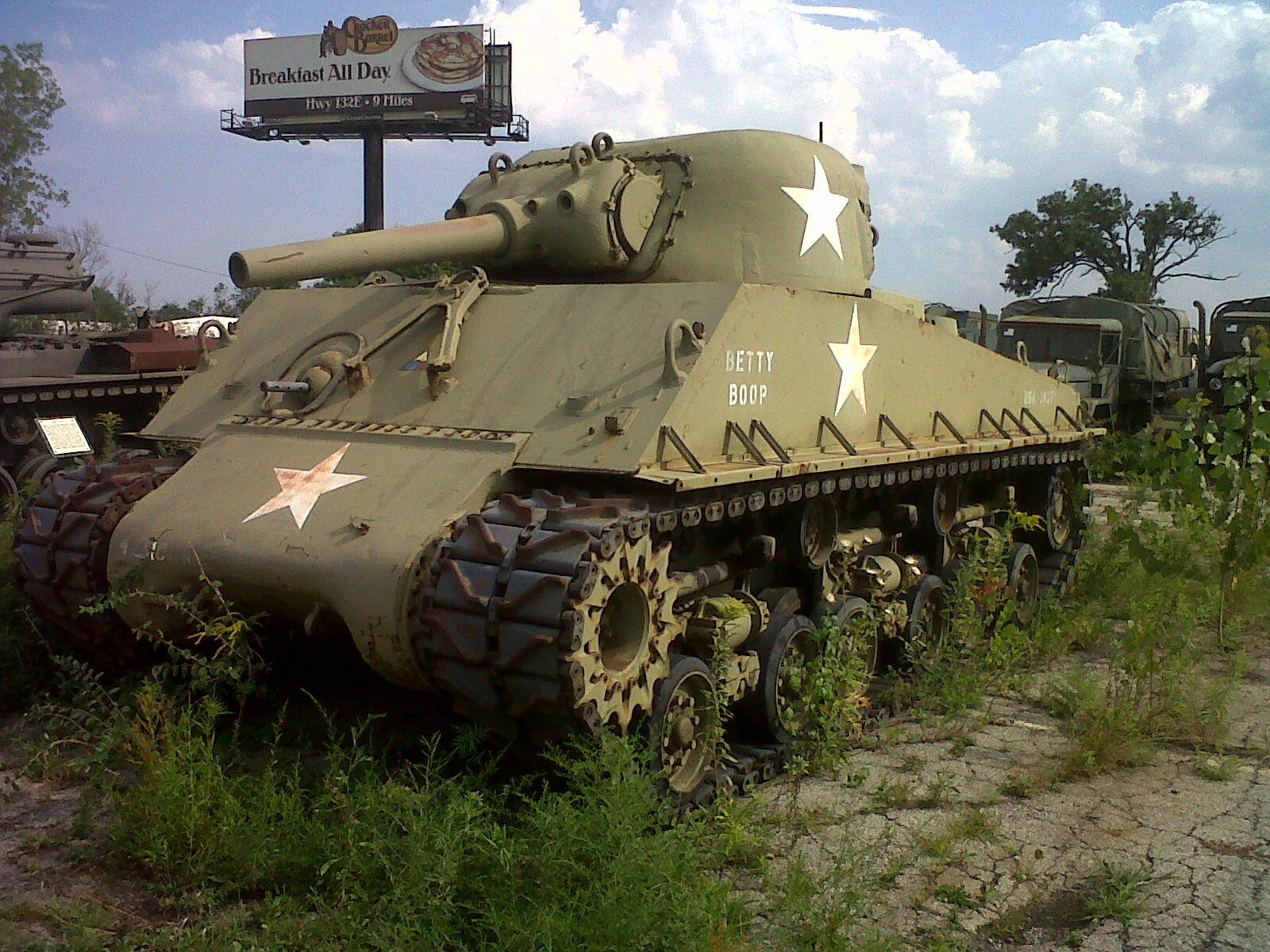
M4 Sherman

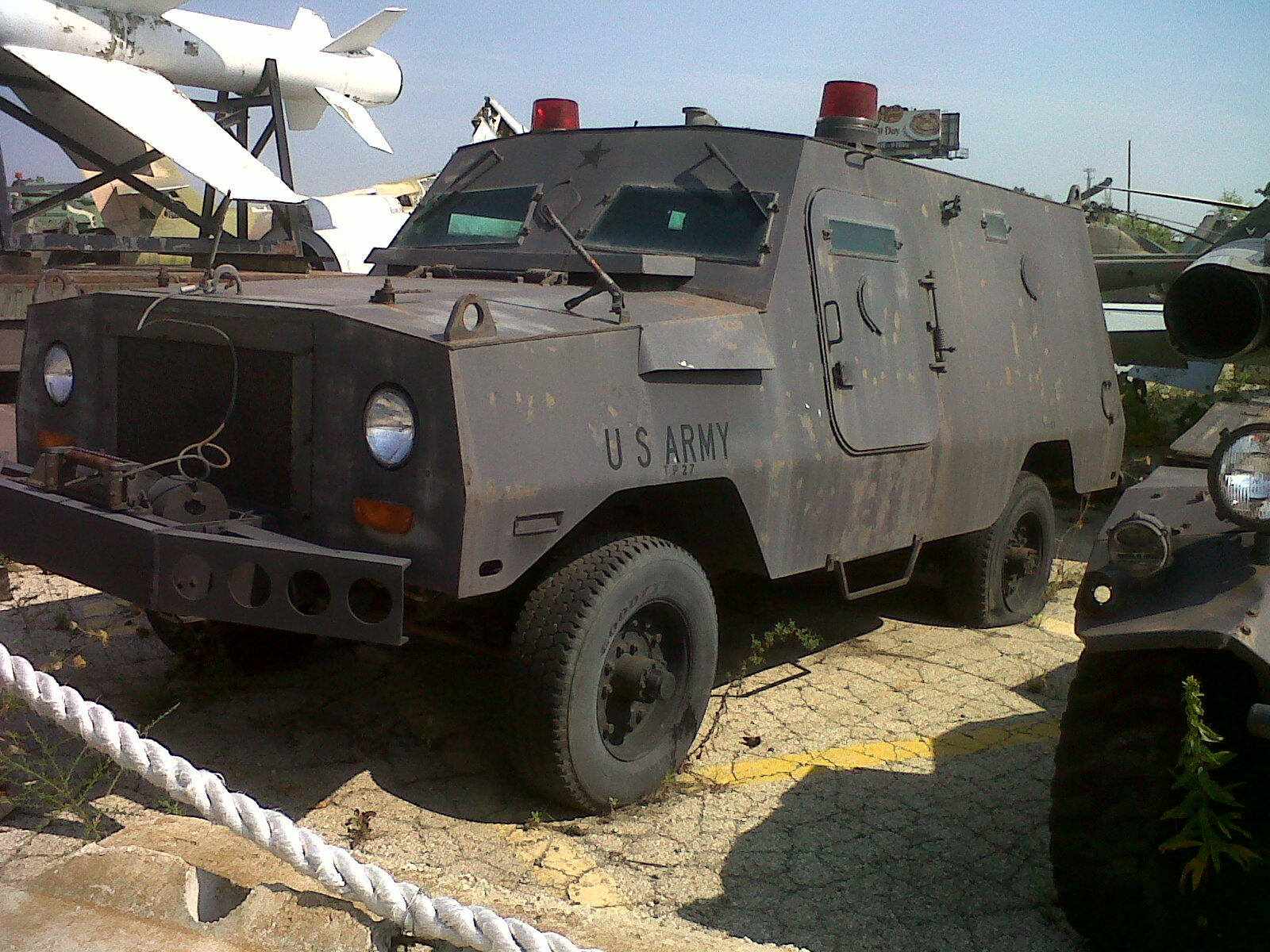
Cadillac Peacekeeper

- Bandvagn 206
- Cadillac Peacekeeper
- Centurion
- CJ-750
- Fast Attack Vehicle
- Ferret armoured car
- FMC XR311
- Harley-Davidson WLA
- LVTP-5
- M3A1 half-track
- M3A1 Stuart
- M4 Sherman
- M4 tractor
- M5 Stuart
- M5 tractor
- M7 Priest
- M16A1 multiple gun motor carriage
- M29C Weasel
- M32 tank recovery vehicle
- M35
- M37
- M41 Walker Bulldog
- M42 Duster
- M47 Patton
- M48 AVLB
- M48 Patton
- M60 Patton
- M110 howitzer
- M113 armored personnel carrier
- M114 Command and Reconnaissance Carrier
- M116 Husky
- M151
- M274
- M548
- M561 Gama Goat
- M578 light recovery vehicle
- M715
- M725
- M726
- M816
- M911
- M984
- M998
- M1008
- M1009
- M1030
- MLull EBFL
- Pandur I
- Sexton
- Unimog
- V-100 Commando
- M38
- Willys MB
- Wollard MB-4
- XM-501

== See also ==
- Motts Military Museum
- Indiana Military Museum
