= Matt Prodger =

Matt Prodger is a former BBC News Correspondent who has appeared on all the broadcaster's television and radio outlets. He formerly worked as a Newsnight correspondent and a foreign correspondent.

Prodger was born in Britain but spent most of his childhood in The Middle East.

He was later educated at Banchory Academy in Scotland and studied Politics, Philosophy and Economics at Hertford College, Oxford University.

He began his journalistic career in local newspapers and radio in Scotland, and briefly worked for a Lebanese newspaper before joining BBC GLR in 1996 as a reporter. He moved to World Service radio in 1998. He spent three years working for the station's flagship news programmes Newshour, The World Today, Assignment and From Our Own Correspondent. He also worked as a field producer and reporter in India, Pakistan, Jerusalem, Gaza, Egypt and Lebanon.

He later joined BBC World TV as a producer, and worked for BBC Breakfast News as a reporter before becoming the BBC's Balkans Correspondent based in Belgrade, where he covered the former Yugoslavia. In 2006 he covered the Lebanon war from Israel and Syria and in 2008 reported undercover from Burma in the aftermath of Cyclone Nargis.

In 2009 he joined the BBC's flagship current affairs daily Newsnight as a correspondent where among other stories he covered the MP's expenses and phone hacking scandals. He also secured an exclusive interview with Yemen's President Ali Abdullah Saleh and reported on the rise of Al Qaeda in the Arabian Peninsula.

In 2011 he was appointed Home Affairs Correspondent for the BBC, covering terrorism, policing, security and crime.
