= Ian Prosser (florist) =

Ian Prosser (born August 31, 1957) is a Florida-based florist. Born in Scotland, Prosser first worked on a U.S. presidential inauguration in 1993, at the inauguration of Bill Clinton. He was the Floral Design Chairman for the 2005 inauguration of George W. Bush, having been selected for this honor by the Society of American Florists out of a field of 200,000 florists. This entailed leading a team of 200 volunteer florists creating more than 3,500 floral arrangements. In 2014, Prosser won the Iron Designer Competition at the International Floriculture Expo.
