= Donner Memorial State Park =

State park in California, United States

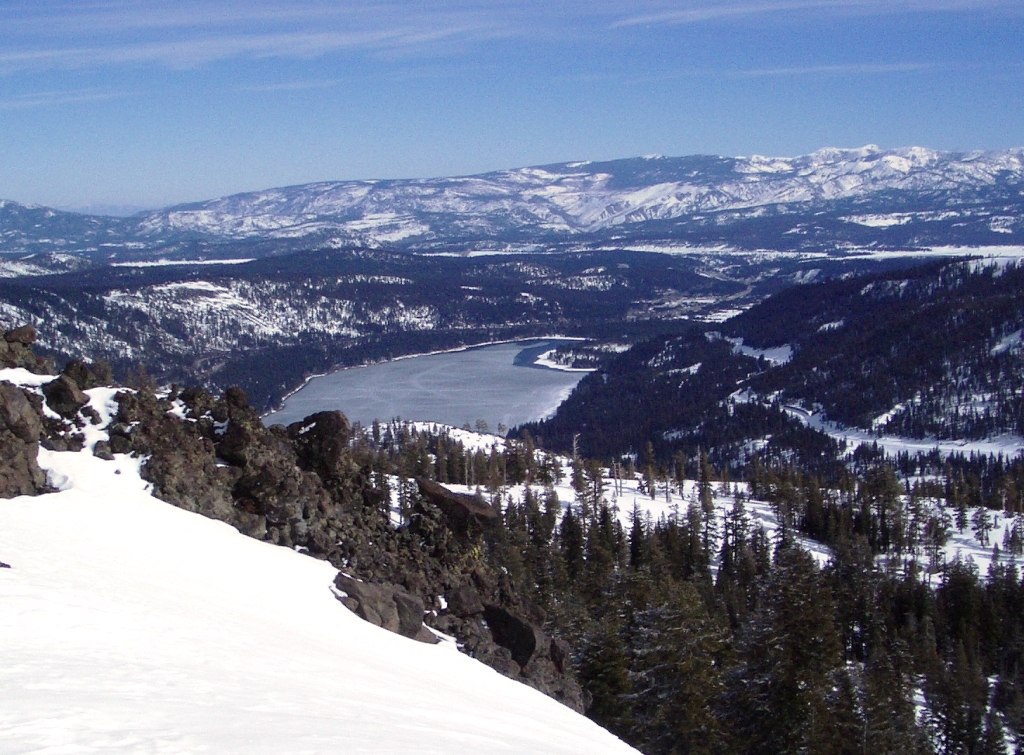
- Donner Lake, with Donner Memorial State Park at the far end, right, viewed from near Donner Peak

- Location within California Location within the United States
- Location: Nevada and Placer Counties, California, US
- Nearest city: Truckee, California
- Coordinates: 39°19′12″N 120°14′30″W
- Area: 3,549 acres (14.36 km^{2})
- Established: 1928
- Governing body: California Department of Parks and Recreation
- Donner Camp
- U.S. National Register of Historic Places
- U.S. National Historic Landmark
- California Historical Landmark No. 134
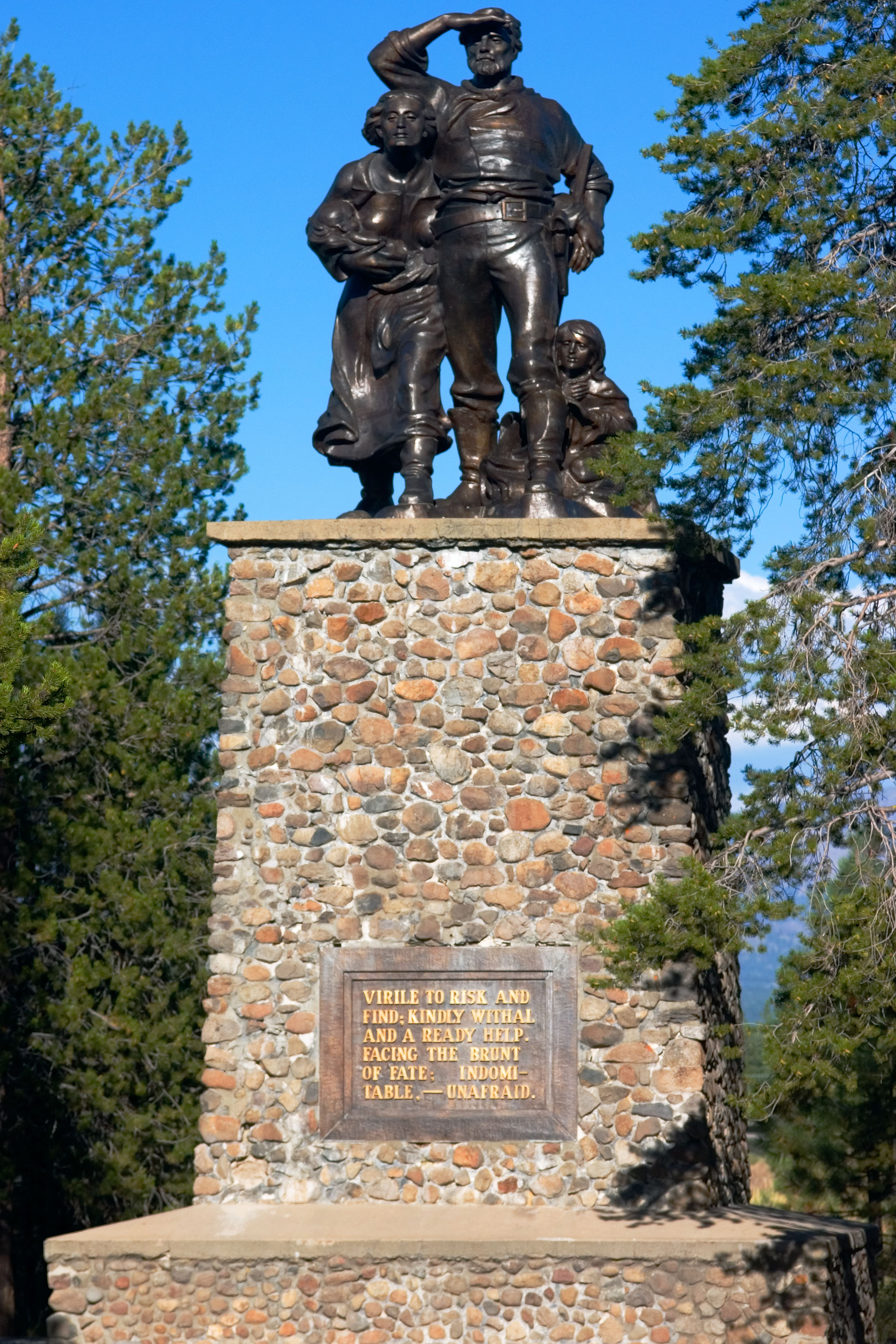
- The 1918 Pioneer Monument at Donner Camp
- Built: 1846
- NRHP reference No.: 66000218
- CHISL No.: 134

Significant dates
- Added to NRHP: October 15, 1966
- Designated NHL: January 20, 1961

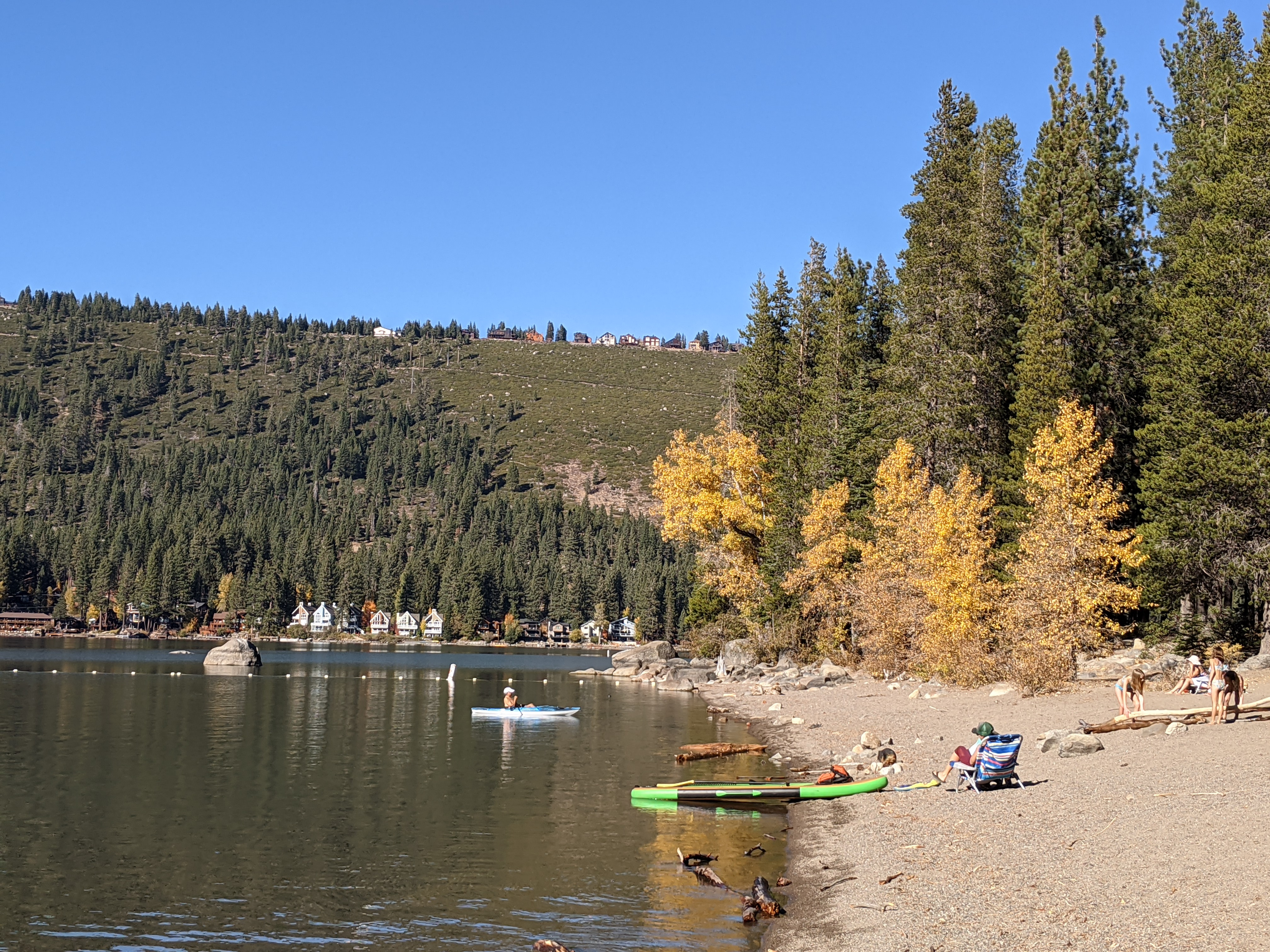
Beach at China Cove in Donner Memorial State Park

Donner Memorial State Park is a California State Park, located at the town of Truckee, California, United States. The park preserves a portion of the Donner Camp site, where members of the ill-fated Donner Party were trapped just short of Donner Pass by weather during the winter of 1846–1847. Caught without shelter or adequate supplies, members of the group resorted to cannibalism to survive. The camp site, high in the Sierra Nevada, has been designated a National Historic Landmark.

The 3,549-acre (1,436 ha) Donner Memorial State Park was established in 1928. It includes memorials to the Donner Party, such as the 1918 Pioneer Monument, along with a visitor center. Recreational opportunities include 18.5 miles (29.8 km) of trails, campgrounds, and 1.7 miles (2.7 km) of frontage on Donner Lake.

== History ==
As snowstorms stranded the Donner Party in the Sierra Nevada, two camps were established where they would attempt to survive the winter. At Alder Creek, a smaller group—including the Donner families—would settle in tents for the season. The larger portion of the wagon party traveled approximately 6 miles (9.7 km) further up the trail, and established their camp near Truckee Lake (now known as Donner Lake); the state park contains the sites of two of the three cabins used at this larger camp. (Note: There were three cabins at the larger Donner camp. One cabin was already standing, having been built by the Stephens–Townsend–Murphy Party in 1844. The Breens took possession of this cabin, apparently by right of first arrival. They allowed Keseberg to build a lean-to for his family against its side. The other two, newly built cabins had flat roofs, and simple openings for doors. One housed the Murphy family, along with the Eddys and others. The other sheltered the Graves family on one end, and the Reeds on the other; with the Reed's servants and teamsters, along with Stanton and two Indians. The Breen and Murphy Cabin sites are within the state park, the Graves Cabin is not.)

Early attempts to memorialize the Donner Party at the larger camp site included at least two different crosses, with the Donner Ice Company erecting a 20-foot-high (6.1 m) cross in 1906, after an earlier one was toppled in a storm. However, these crosses were built at the site of the Graves Cabin, which lies outside the current state park. (Note: The location of the Graves Cabin was near the original Truckee Agricultural Inspection Station along Interstate 80. When I-80 was being built in the 1950s, the cross was moved. It was moved once again in 1988 to make way for commercial development in town. As of 2010, it stands along Donner Pass Road near Truckee Elementary School.)

Within the future park's boundaries, Historian Charles McGlashan acquired 1 acre (0.40 ha) of land for a monument, where once sat the Schallenberger/Breen Cabin. (Note: The Schallenberger/Breen Cabin had been constructed in 1844, by the Stephens–Townsend–Murphy Party, the first to pioneer the route over Donner Pass. The cabin was still standing when the Donner party arrived two years later, and the Breen family occupied it during the winter.) This property was acquired by McGlashan from Joseph Marzen, owner of Donner Ice Company. With the help of the Native Sons of the Golden West, a monument at the site was constructed and then dedicated in June 1918.

In 1927, Cora Woodbridge brought forth legislation which allowed the state to acquire the now 11 acres (4.5 ha) of property at the larger Donner campsite owned by the Native Sons of the Golden West, including the 1918 monument. Passed by the California State Legislature that year, the bill also allowed for the purchase of additional land, all to be part of a new state park. On August 18, 1928, the property was ceremoniously transferred to the state during a celebration at the site.

Since its establishment in 1928, numerous land acquisitions have added to the park's acreage. This includes a major purchase in 1948, which brought the southeast shore of Donner Lake under the state's control. A number of trails and campsites were developed on the additional land.

== Features ==
=== Visitor center ===
While the monument was owned by the Native Sons of the Golden West, they leased land to T. C. Wohlbruck, who built a concession just west of the memorial. Opened in April 1920, Wohlbruck called the site the "Pioneer Donner Park," and within the concession he sold fuel, food, soda, souvenirs and provided a museum. The state cancelled the concession in 1930, and the building become park headquarters. At least two additional museums/visitor centers have been created since; the Emigrant Trail Museum in 1962, which was replaced by the Donner Memorial State Park Visitors Center in 2015.

Ground was broken for the Emigrant Trail Museum at the park in June 1961. As completion of the museum neared, relics of the Donner Party were moved from the museum at Sutter's Fort to the new museum. Inside, exhibits focused not just on the Donner Party, but on the Indigenous peoples of the area, early transportation at the Pass, and the emigrant era in general. The completed museum, costing $250,000 (equivalent to $2,660,891 in 2025), was dedicated on September 9, 1962. During the dedication, Bennett Gale, from the US National Park Service presented a plaque honoring the site being listed as a National Historic Landmark, and Charles DeTurk of the state's park department provided an address. The museum's audio-visual room was named in honor of Bizz Johnson, a US Congressman from California, who helped secure funding for the building.

After years of planning, construction for a new museum began in 2011 to replace the aging, small Emigrant Trail Museum. Originally meant to be called the High Sierra Crossing Museum, the building was finished in 2013, but due to contract disputes and a lack of funds, its opening was delayed. After the challenges were resolved, the new Donner Memorial State Park Visitor Center opened on June 6, 2015, which was also celebrated as the 97th anniversary of the Pioneer Monument in the park. The new visitor center cost $9.6 million (equivalent to $13,039,450 in 2025), and contained 9,400 square feet (870 m^{2}) of space. Inside the visitor center are exhibits about the cultural history of the area, including local Indigenous peoples, the Donner Party, and builders of the First transcontinental railroad. Park staff offer hikes, special presentations and campfires by the museum.

The old Emigrant Trail Museum building is now used as office space and storage.

=== Donner Party monuments ===
==== Pioneer Monument ====
Historian Charles McGlashan had acquired 1 acre (0.40 ha) of land for a monument at the site of the Schallenberger/Breen Cabin. This property came from Joseph Marzen, owner of Donner Ice Company. By the late 1890s, McGlashan had enlisted the Native Sons of the Golden West (NSGW) to help bring the monument to fruition. After years of planning and fundraising, a cornerstone laying ceremony for the monument was held on June 10, 1910. The stone, weighing 600 pounds (270 kg), was meant to be temporary, and carved on one of its sides was a message which noted a future monument would be built at the site "to the pioneers who crossed the plains." Present at the ceremony were three women, who, as young girls, had been part of the Donner Party; they were Frances Donner-Wilder, Virginia Reed-Murphy, and Martha "Patty" Reed-Lewis. McGlashan exhibited several relics during the ceremony and auctioned off small wooden pieces of the Murphy Cabin, which he had sealed in glass vials. Also present was Chester W. Chapman, chairman of the NSGW's Donner Monument Committee. By the time the cornerstone had been laid, it had already been decided that the planned monument would be too small to "express the story that the monument was to tell" and that for the time being, only the stone would be laid, while new plans were made and additional funds raised.

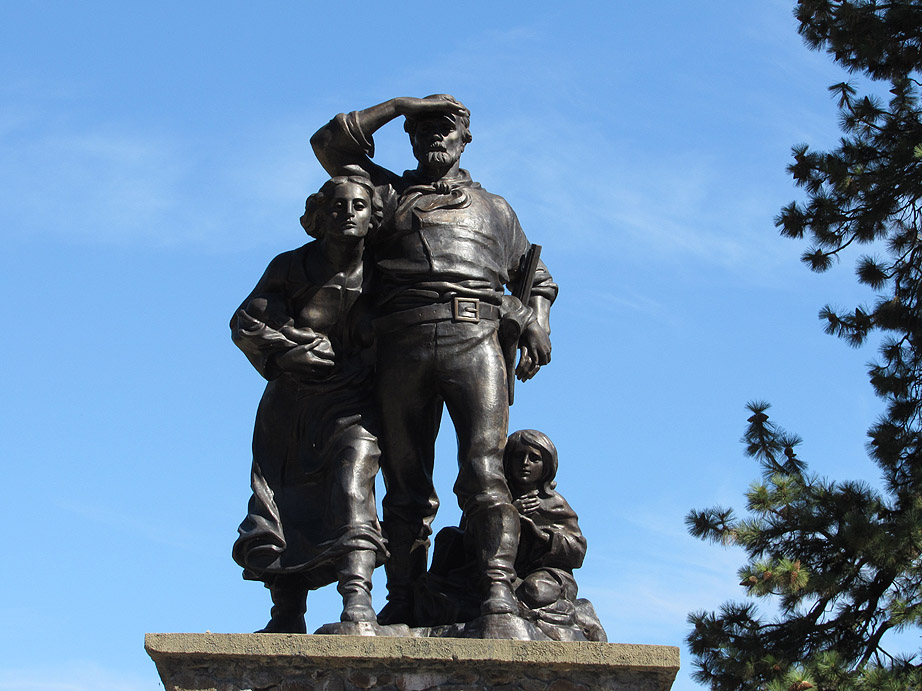
The Pioneer, sculpture atop the monument

The completed monument was unveiled on June 6, 1918. Present at the ceremony were California Governor William Stephens and Nevada Governor Emmet D. Boyle. Also present were Frances Donner-Wilder, Eliza Donner-Houghton, and Martha "Patty" Reed-Lewis, who had been members of the Donner Party as young girls. The monument's base is 20 by 21 feet (6.1 by 6.4 m) with a pedestal that rises 22 feet (6.7 m) high (the height of the snow during the winter of 1846–1847); both base and pedestal are faced with cobblestone. Placed on top of the pedestal is a statue of a pioneer family, rising an additional 17.5 feet (5.3 m) high. The statue, titled "The Pioneer", was created by artist John McQuarrie.

The completed monument's cost was $35,000 (equivalent to $749,170 in 2025), and the bronze statue atop it was said to be the largest in the United States west of the Mississippi River at the time. It was thought to have been built on the exact spot of the Schallenberger/Breen Cabin– a position McGlashan would defend, even writing a booklet, titled The Location of Site of Breen Cabin (1920). However, others—most notably NSGW's Chester W. Chapman—claimed the cabin was just south of the monument's location. Another point of contention had arisen between McGlashan and Chapman during the planning of the monument. McGlashan felt the monument should honor and memorialize only the Donner Party, and Chapman and the NSGW, wanted it to represent all pioneers who traveled west to settle California.

The plaque on the front of the Pioneer Monument reads:

Virile to risk and find; Kindly withal and a ready help.
Facing the brunt of fate; Indomitable,—Unafraid.

The plaque on the rear of the Pioneer Monument reads:

Near this spot stood the Breen Cabin of the party of emigrants who started for California from Springfield, Illinois, in April 1846, under the leadership of Captain George Donner. Delays occurred and when the party reached this locality, on October 29, the Truckee Pass Emigrant Road was concealed by snow. The height of the shaft of the monument indicates the depth of the snow, which was twenty-two feet. After futile efforts to cross the summit the party was compelled to encamp for the winter. The Graves Cabin was situated about three-quarters of a mile to the eastward, the Murphy Cabin about two hundred yards southwest of the monument, and the Donner tents were at the head of Alder Creek. Ninety people were in the party and forty-two perished, most of them from starvation and exposure.

In commemoration of the pioneers who crossed the plains to settle in California
Monument erected under the auspices of the Native Sons and the Native Daughters of the Golden West
Monument dedicated June 6, 1918

The monument underwent a comprehensive restoration in 2022, with funding from the Sierra State Parks Foundation.

==== Schallenberger/Breen Cabin site ====
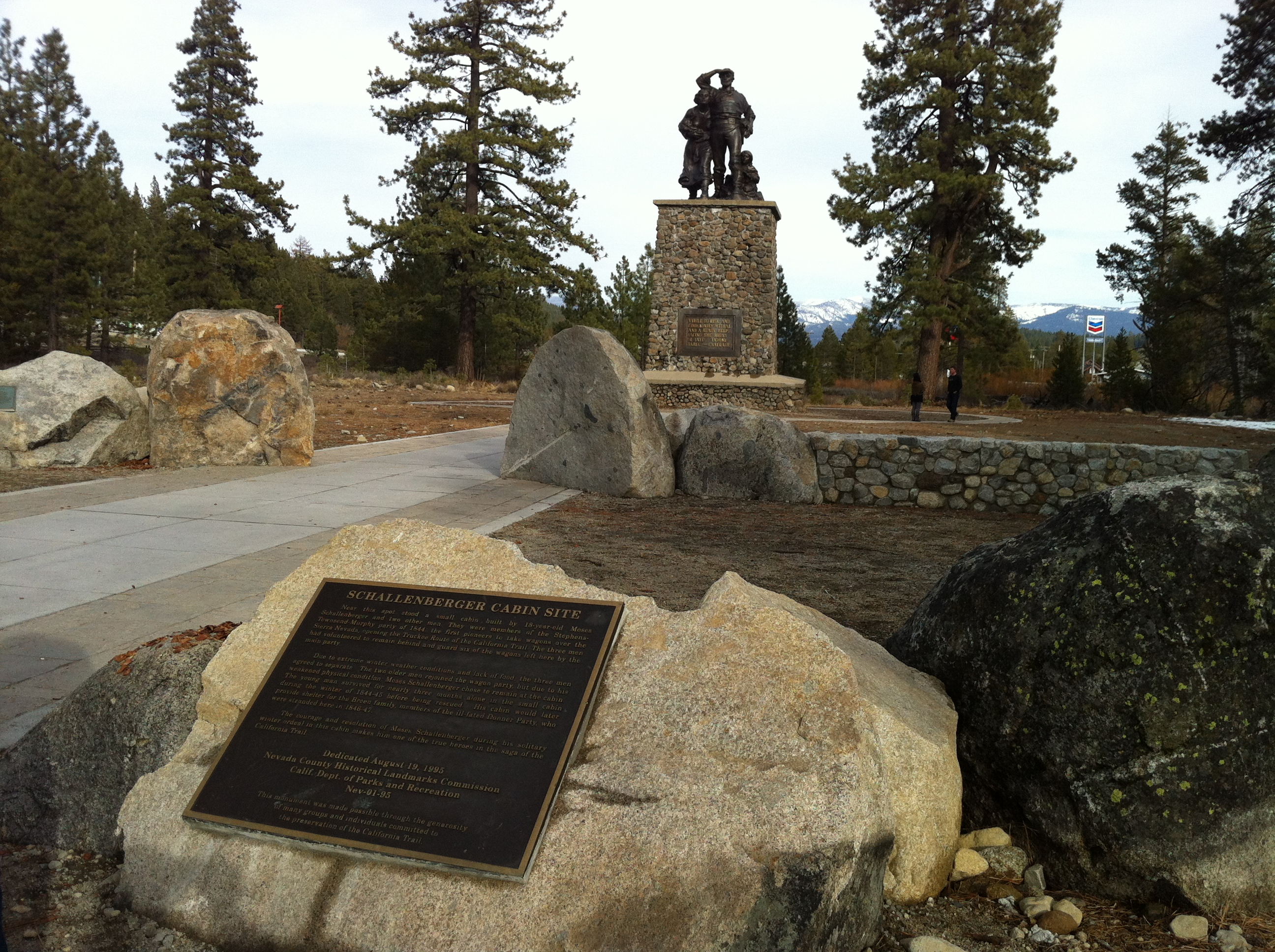
Plaque with the history of the Schallenberger Cabin; the Pioneer Monument can be seen in the background

The Pioneer Monument was built on or near the site of the Moses Schallenberger Cabin, which the Breen family occupied two years later while stranded at the site with other members of the Donner Party. A plaque was added in 1995 with a history of the cabin, it reads:

Near this spot stood a small cabin built by 18-year-old Moses Schallenberger and two other men. They were members of the Stephens–Townsend–Murphy party of 1844, the first pioneers to take wagons over the Sierra Nevada, opening the Truckee Route of the California Trail. The three men had volunteered to remain behind and guard six of the wagons left here by the main party.

Due to extreme winter weather conditions and lack of food, the three men agreed to separate. The two older men rejoined the wagon party, but due to his weakened physical condition, Moses Schallenberger chose to remain at the cabin. The young man survived for nearly three months alone in the small cabin during the winter of 1844-45, before being rescued. His cabin would later provide shelter for the Breen family, members of the ill-fated Donner Party, who were stranded here in 1846-47.

The courage and resolution of Moses Schallenberger during his solitary winter ordeal in the cabin makes him one of the true heroes in the saga of the California Trail.

Dedicated August 19, 1995
Nevada County Historical Landmarks Commission
Calif. Dept. of Parks and Recreation
Nev-01-95

This monument was made possible through the generosity of many groups and individuals committed to the preservation of the California Trail.

==== Murphy Cabin site ====
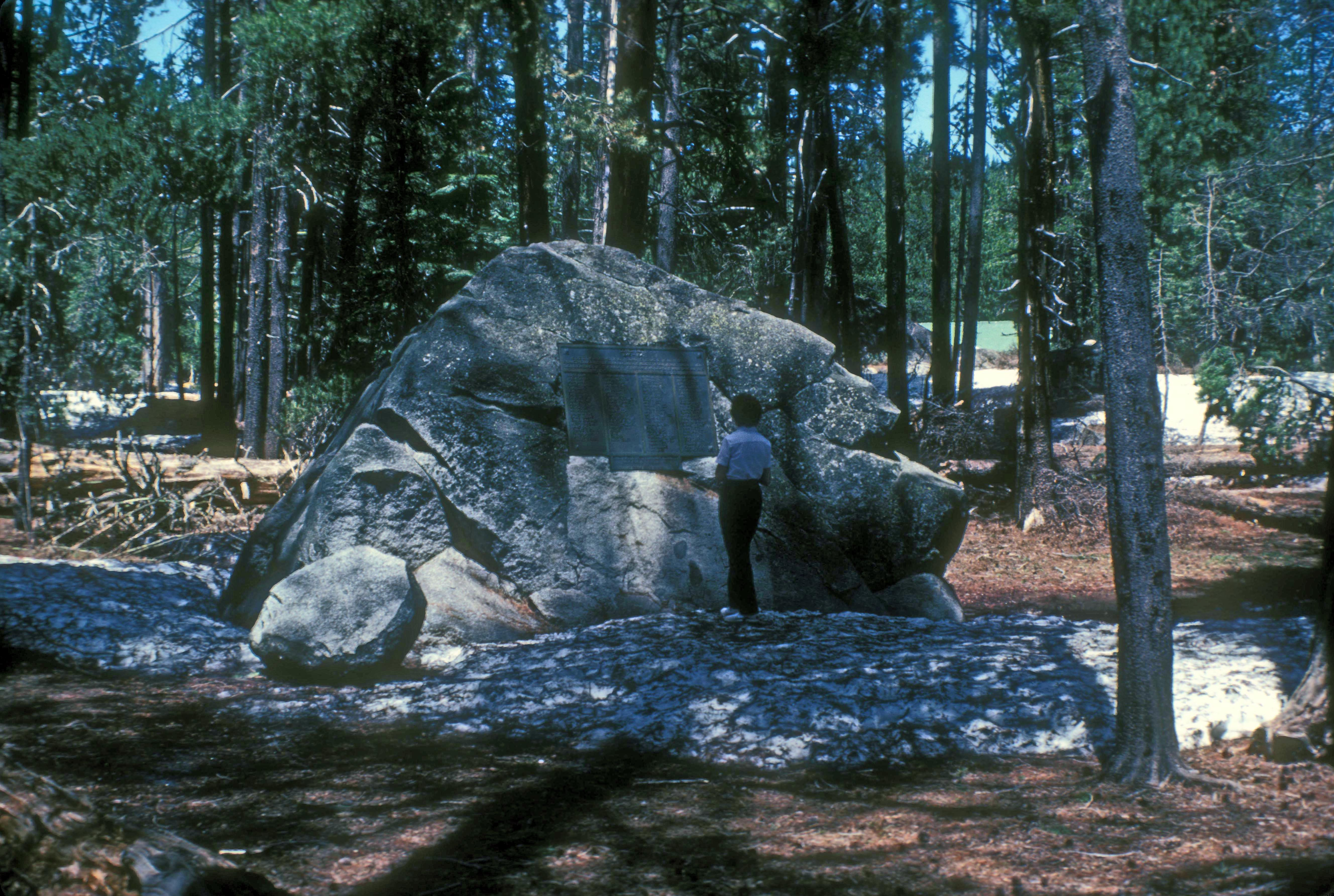
Monument at the site of the Murphy Cabin

The site of the Murphy Cabin was added to the park as part of a 1948 purchase of additional property. At the site is the large granite boulder against which was built the cabin that sheltered members of the Murphy, Pike, Foster, and Eddy families. A 1919 plaque on the boulder's face reads:

The face of this rock formed the north end and the fireplace of the Murphy Cabin. General Stephen W. Kearny, on June 22, 1847, buried, under the middle of the cabin the bodies found in the vicinity. Following is a complete list of the members of the Donner Party who occupied the various cabins and tents.

On the plaque, this quote is followed by a list of the members of the Donner Party, divided into "Survived" and "Perished." (Some of the information on this plaque is inaccurate, however.)

== Climate ==
The park has either a Mediterranean climate or a humid continental climate (Köppen climate classification Dsb/Csb) with cold, snowy winters and warm, dry summers. Winters are cold with a January average of 27.2 °F (−2.7 °C) and temperatures below 0 °F (−17.8 °C) occur on 3.6 days per year. Most of the precipitation falls during the winter months with an average precipitation of 38.81 inches (986 mm) and an average snowfall of 182.9 inches (465 cm). Summers are dry with warm daytime temperatures (can exceed 90 °F (32.2 °C) on 6.3 days) and cold nighttime temperatures that often reach below 32 °F (0.0 °C). The average high in the warmest month, July is 82.3 °F (27.9 °C) and the average low is 43.5 °F (6.4 °C) with a mean precipitation of only 0.35 inches (0.9 cm). The record low is −28 °F (−33.3 °C) on February 27, 1962, and the record high is 99 °F (37.2 °C) on July 10–11, 2002 and August 9, 1981.

Climate data for Donner Memorial State Park, California, 1991–2020 normals, extremes 1953–2015
Month	Jan	Feb	Mar	Apr	May	Jun	Jul	Aug	Sep	Oct	Nov	Dec	Year
Record high °F (°C)	67 (19)	67 (19)	72 (22)	79 (26)	88 (31)	95 (35)	99 (37)	99 (37)	96 (36)	90 (32)	75 (24)	67 (19)	99 (37)
Mean maximum °F (°C)	54.2 (12.3)	56.1 (13.4)	61.6 (16.4)	70.5 (21.4)	79.8 (26.6)	85.5 (29.7)	91.0 (32.8)	89.9 (32.2)	85.5 (29.7)	76.4 (24.7)	63.9 (17.7)	52.4 (11.3)	92.7 (33.7)
Mean daily maximum °F (°C)	41.0 (5.0)	43.1 (6.2)	47.8 (8.8)	53.5 (11.9)	63.2 (17.3)	73.0 (22.8)	82.3 (27.9)	80.8 (27.1)	74.5 (23.6)	62.6 (17.0)	49.2 (9.6)	39.1 (3.9)	59.2 (15.1)
Daily mean °F (°C)	29.0 (−1.7)	30.7 (−0.7)	34.8 (1.6)	39.9 (4.4)	48.1 (8.9)	55.5 (13.1)	62.9 (17.2)	61.4 (16.3)	55.4 (13.0)	45.9 (7.7)	35.9 (2.2)	28.1 (−2.2)	44.0 (6.7)
Mean daily minimum °F (°C)	17.0 (−8.3)	18.4 (−7.6)	21.8 (−5.7)	26.2 (−3.2)	33.0 (0.6)	38.0 (3.3)	43.5 (6.4)	42.0 (5.6)	36.3 (2.4)	29.2 (−1.6)	22.7 (−5.2)	17.1 (−8.3)	28.8 (−1.8)
Mean minimum °F (°C)	0.4 (−17.6)	0.2 (−17.7)	6.9 (−13.9)	15.7 (−9.1)	23.3 (−4.8)	28.1 (−2.2)	33.7 (0.9)	33.2 (0.7)	27.0 (−2.8)	19.7 (−6.8)	9.0 (−12.8)	0.6 (−17.4)	−4.6 (−20.3)
Record low °F (°C)	−18 (−28)	−28 (−33)	−10 (−23)	0 (−18)	10 (−12)	21 (−6)	23 (−5)	20 (−7)	16 (−9)	4 (−16)	−3 (−19)	−23 (−31)	−28 (−33)
Average precipitation inches (mm)	6.73 (171)	6.57 (167)	6.18 (157)	2.67 (68)	2.13 (54)	0.67 (17)	0.35 (8.9)	0.36 (9.1)	0.49 (12)	2.19 (56)	3.57 (91)	6.90 (175)	38.81 (986)
Average snowfall inches (cm)	40.0 (102)	37.7 (96)	32.9 (84)	15.4 (39)	3.4 (8.6)	0.5 (1.3)	0.0 (0.0)	0.0 (0.0)	0.0 (0.0)	2.4 (6.1)	10.1 (26)	40.5 (103)	182.9 (466)
Average extreme snow depth inches (cm)	34.1 (87)	40.4 (103)	36.9 (94)	18.7 (47)	3.8 (9.7)	0.3 (0.76)	0.0 (0.0)	0.0 (0.0)	0.2 (0.51)	1.7 (4.3)	8.6 (22)	24.8 (63)	51.7 (131)
Average precipitation days (≥ 0.01 in)	10.7	10.3	9.7	7.4	6.6	3.2	1.3	1.6	2.4	4.3	6.5	10.5	74.5
Average snowy days (≥ 0.1 in)	8.9	8.5	6.8	4.7	1.6	0.3	0.0	0.0	0.0	1.0	3.3	7.6	42.7
Source 1: NOAA
Source 2: XMACIS2 (mean maxima/minima, snow depth 1981–2010)

== See also ==
- Donner-Reed Museum
- List of California state parks
