= Prosser Creek Dam =

Dam in Nevada County, California, United States of America

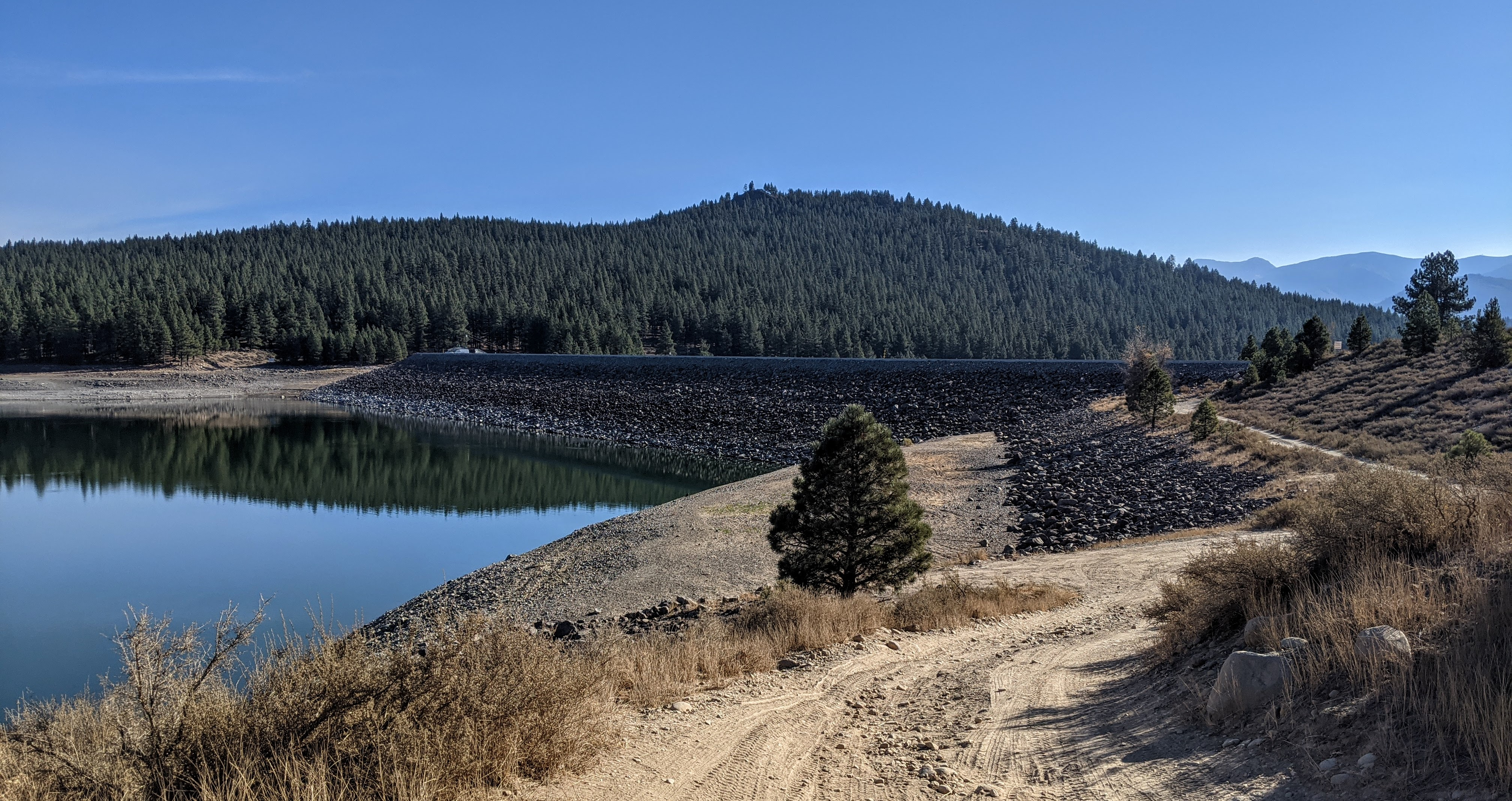
- Prosser Creek Dam viewed from the south shore of Prosser Creek Reservoir
- Location: Nevada County, California
- Coordinates: 39°22′45″N 120°08′19″W
- Construction began: 1959; 66 years ago
- Opening date: 1962; 63 years ago
- Owner(s): United States Bureau of Reclamation

Dam and spillways
- Type of dam: earthen and rockfill
- Impounds: Prosser Creek
- Height: 163 feet (50 m)
- Length: 1,830 feet (560 m)

Reservoir
- Creates: Prosser Creek Reservoir
- Total capacity: 29,800 acre⋅ft (36,800 dam^{3})
- Surface area: 750 acres (300 ha)
- National ID # CA10179

Prosser Creek Dam (National ID # CA10179) is a dam in Nevada County, California.

The earthen and rockfill dam was constructed from 1959 to 1962 by the United States Bureau of Reclamation with a height of 163 feet (50 m) feet and a crest length of 1,830 feet (560 m). It impounds Prosser Creek (a tributary of the Truckee River) for irrigation storage and winter and spring flood control, part of the Bureau's larger Washoe Project in the Tahoe region. The dam is owned and operated by the Bureau.

The reservoir it creates, Prosser Creek Reservoir, has a water surface of about 750 acres (300 ha), a shoreline of approximately 11 miles (18 km), and has a capacity of 29,800 acre-feet (36,800,000 m^{3}). Recreation includes fishing (for rainbow and brown trout), boating, camping, hunting, and hiking.

== Gallery ==
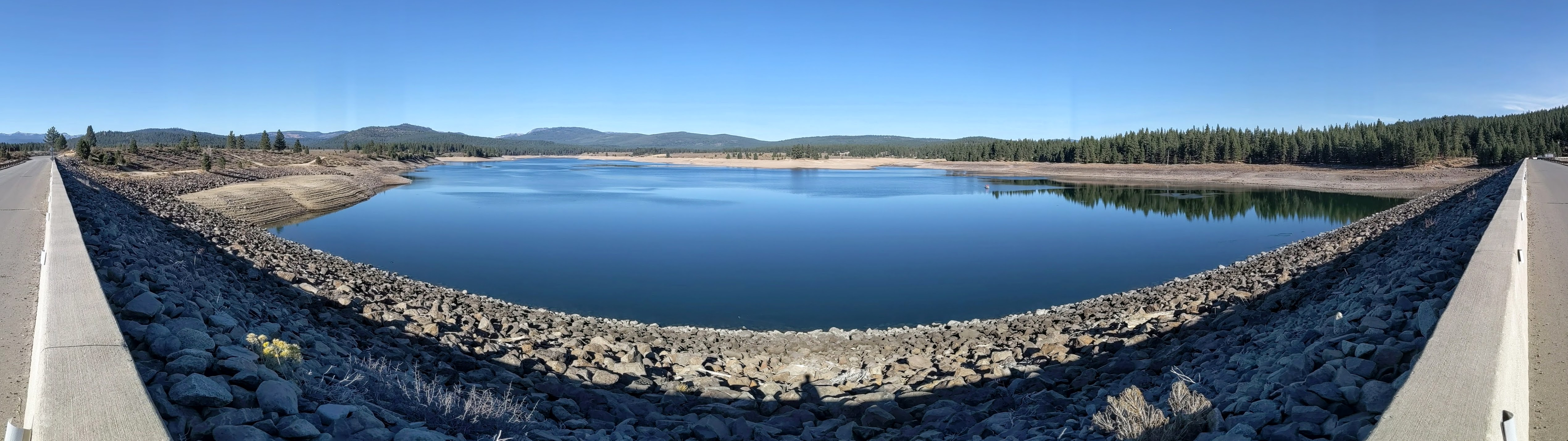
Panoramic view of Prosser Creek Reservoir from atop the dam
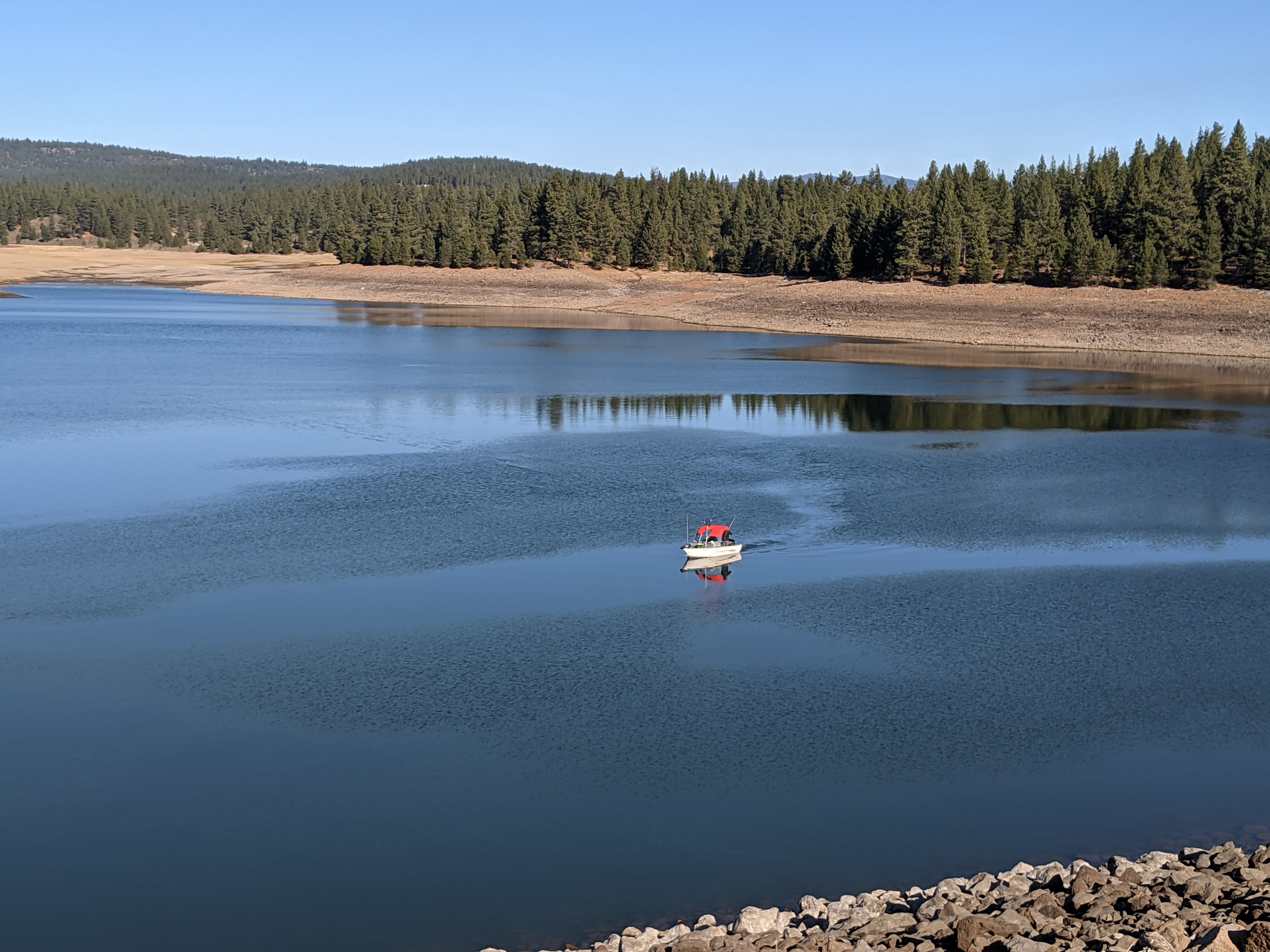
A fishing boat on the reservoir

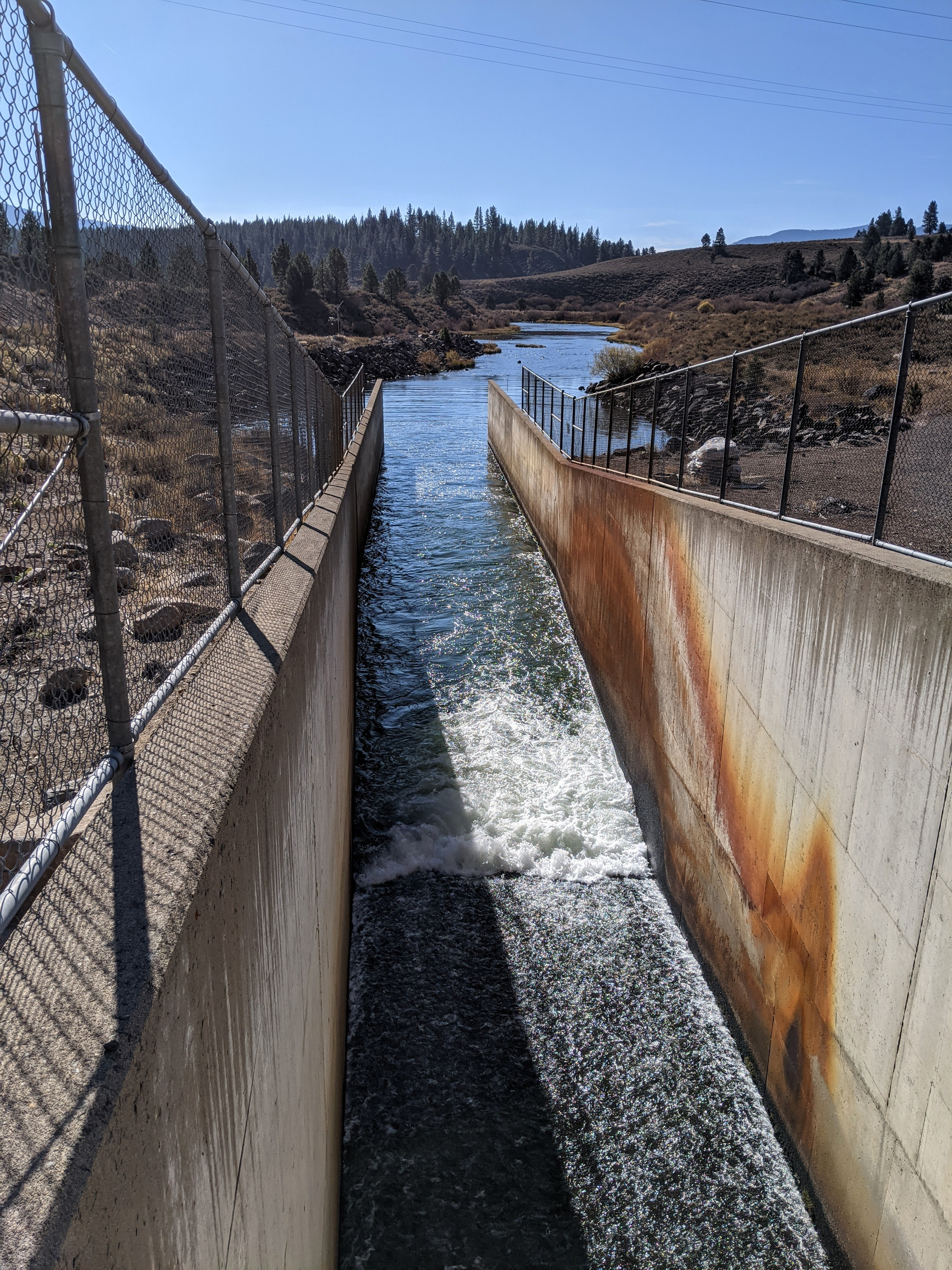
Outflow from the main spillway into Prosser Creek

== See also ==
- List of dams and reservoirs in California
- List of lakes in California
