= Susan Rosser =

Professor of Synthetic Biology

- Education: University of Dundee
- Scientific career
- Fields: Synthetic biology
- Workplaces: University of Edinburgh; University of Glasgow; University of Cambridge
- Website: http://rosser.bio.ed.ac.uk/

Susan Rosser FRSE FRSB FLSW is a professor of Synthetic Biology at the University of Edinburgh.

Rosser’s research focuses on the development of synthetic biology approaches and tools for engineering pathways and genomes in cell systems. Her work has been applied in biologic therapeutics, developing genetic tools for engineering stem cells and bio-computation.

== Education ==
Rosser studied microbiology and genetics at the University of Dundee. Her Ph.D. was on the mechanisms of multiple antibiotic resistance.

== Career and research ==
Rosser is currently Professor of Synthetic Biology at the University of Edinburgh, a joint appointment between the Schools of Biological Sciences and of Engineering. She is Director of the Edinburgh Mammalian Synthetic Biology Research Centre and Co-director of the Edinburgh Genome Foundry.

She has previously worked in the Institute of Biotechnology at the University of Cambridge researching the biotransformation of cocaine and explosive material. She was a lecturer in Biotechnology at the Institute of Molecular, Cell and Systems Biology at the University of Glasgow, where she was promoted to Professor in 2012. In 2011, she was awarded a Leadership Fellowship by the Engineering and Physical Sciences Research Council.

In 2015 Rosser was awarded funding to develop a new research centre for synthetic biology in Edinburgh, jointly funded from the 2012 Autumn Statement, the Biotechnology and Biological Sciences Research Council, Engineering and Physical Sciences Research Council, and the Medical Research Council.

Rosser is a member of the Scottish Industrial Biotechnology Development Group, and the Scottish Science Advisory Council, Scotland's highest level science advisory body, providing independent advice and recommendations on science strategy, policy and priorities to the Scottish Government.

Rosser is part of a group of scientists attempting to create a human genome in the laboratory, billed as an extension of the Human Genome Project, moving from reading the genome to building it.

In April 2018, Rosser was a recipient of a Royal Academy of Engineering’s Chair in Emerging Technologies, a scheme providing long-term support to visionary researchers in developing technologies with high potential to deliver economic and social benefit to the United Kingdom. Rosser was awarded the Chair for her research project to genetically engineer implantable 'surveillance cells' that recognize and process information associated with changes due to disease, which would allow for earlier detection and targeted treatment.

Rosser was elected a Fellow of the Royal Society of Edinburgh in 2022. Rosser was also elected a Fellow of the Learned Society of Wales in 2022.
