= Ronald E. Rosser =

United States Army Medal of Honor recipient (1929–2020)

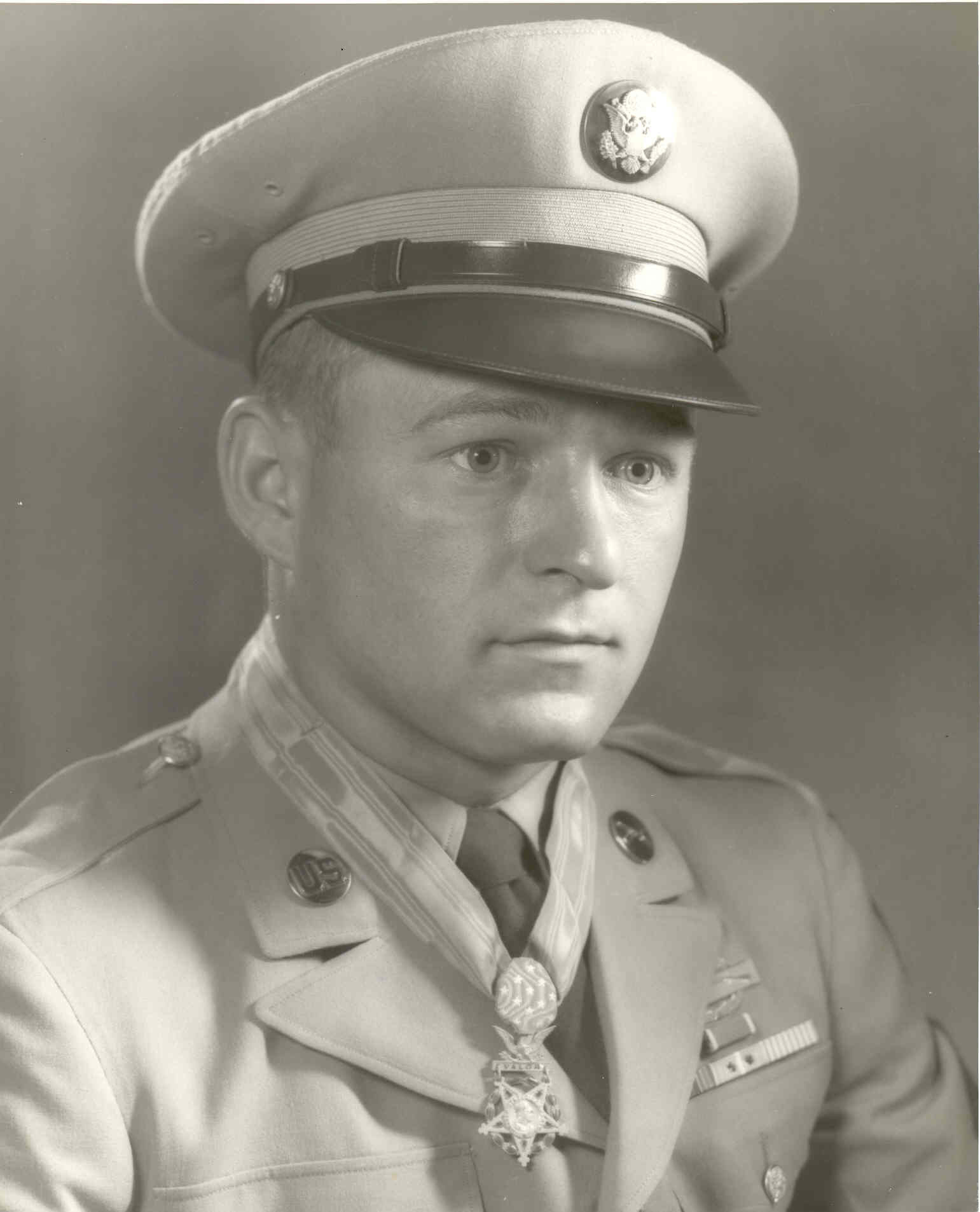
- Born: Ronald Eugene Rosser; October 24, 1929; Columbus, Ohio
- Died: August 26, 2020 (aged 90); Bumpus Mills, Tennessee
- Burial place: Iliff Cemetery, McLuney, Ohio
- Military career
- Allegiance: United States
- Branch: United States Army
- Service years: 1946–1949; 1951–1968
- Rank: Sergeant First Class
- Units: Company L, 38th Infantry Regiment, 2nd Infantry Division
- Conflicts: Korean War; Vietnam War
- Awards: Medal of Honor; Purple Heart

Ronald Eugene Rosser (October 24, 1929 – August 26, 2020) was a United States Army soldier who received the United States military's highest decoration, the Medal of Honor, for thrice attacking a hill alone, killing 13 enemies while wounded and carrying wounded comrades to safety one winter day in the Korean War.

== Military service ==
Born on October 24, 1929, in Columbus, Ohio, Rosser was the oldest of 17 children. He joined the United States Army as a paratrooper in the 82nd Airborne Division in 1946 at age 17 shortly after World War II for a three-year term of service. After one of his brothers was killed in the early stages of the Korean War, he re-enlisted from Crooksville, Ohio, in 1951 as a way of getting revenge. Initially stationed in Japan, Rosser requested to be sent into combat and was then deployed to Korea with the heavy mortar company of the 38th Infantry Regiment, 2nd Infantry Division.

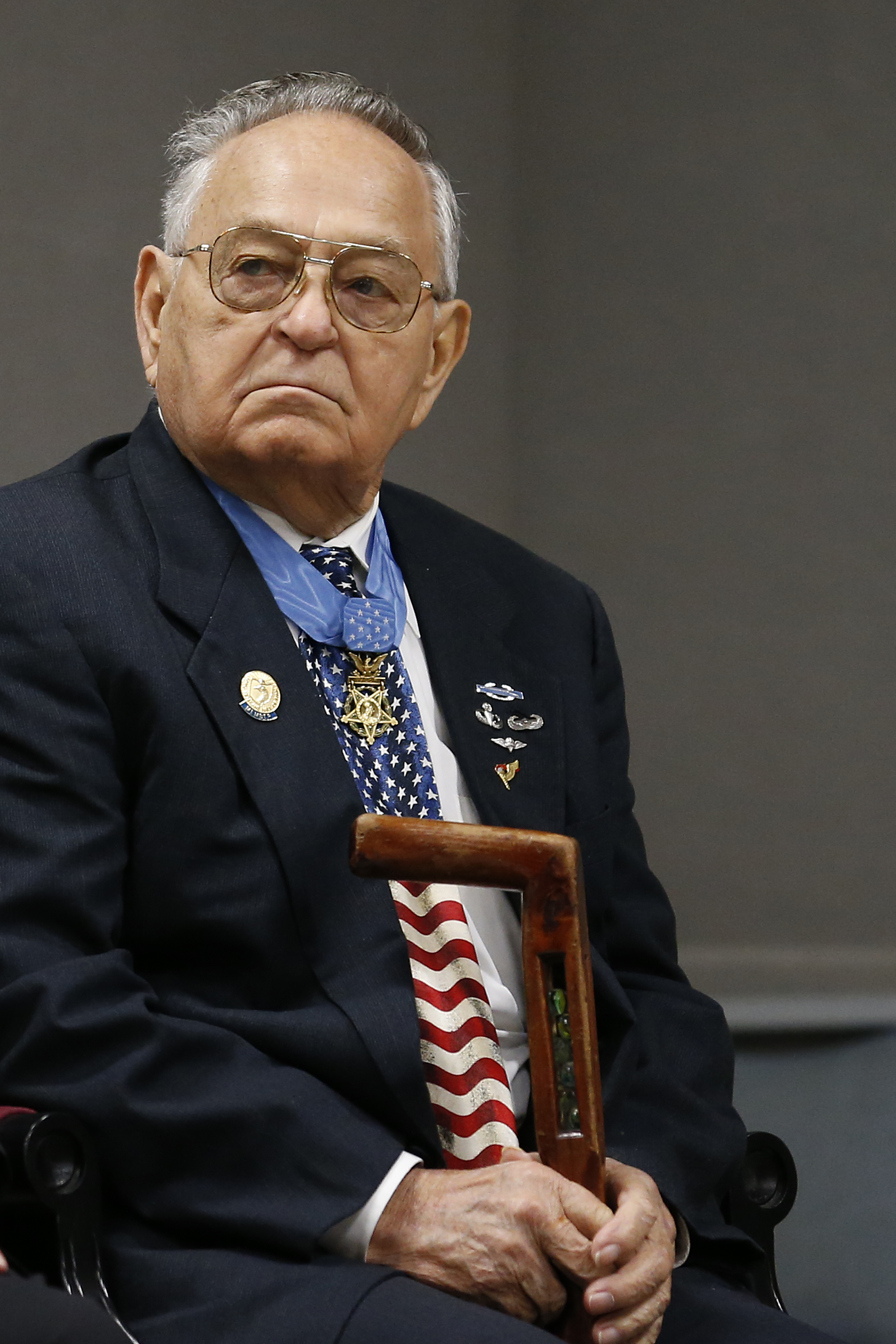
Rosser in 2012

On January 12, 1952, Rosser, by then a corporal, was acting as a forward observer with Company L's lead platoon during an assault on a heavily fortified hill near Ponggilli. When the unit came under heavy fire, Rosser went forward three times and attacked the hostile positions alone, each time returning to friendly lines to gather more ammunition before charging the hill again. Although wounded himself, he helped carry injured soldiers to safety once withdrawal became necessary. For these actions, Rosser was awarded the Medal of Honor. During his service, he also earned a Combat Infantry Badge, Glider Badge, Master Parachutist Badge, Pathfinder badge, Parachute Rigger and Army Recruiter Badge.

Rosser returned to the United States in May 1952 and was formally presented with the Medal of Honor by President Harry Truman a month later, on June 27, 1952.

On September 20, 1966, another of Rosser's brothers, PFC Gary Edward Rosser, USMC, was killed in action, this time in the Vietnam War. Rosser requested a combat assignment in Vietnam, but was rejected and retired from the army soon after.

== Medal of Honor citation ==
Rosser's official Medal of Honor citation reads:

Cpl. Rosser, distinguished himself by conspicuous gallantry above and beyond the call of duty. While assaulting heavily fortified enemy hill positions, Company L, 38th Infantry Regiment, was stopped by fierce automatic-weapons, small-arms, artillery, and mortar fire. Cpl. Rosser, a forward observer, was with the lead platoon of Company L when it came under fire from 2 directions. Cpl. Rosser turned his radio over to his assistant and, disregarding the enemy fire, charged the enemy positions armed with only carbine and a grenade. At the first bunker, he silenced its occupants with a burst from his weapon. Gaining the top of the hill, he killed 2 enemy soldiers, and then went down the trench, killing 5 more as he advanced. He then hurled his grenade into a bunker and shot 2 other soldiers as they emerged. Having exhausted his ammunition, he returned through the enemy fire to obtain more ammunition and grenades and charged the hill once more. Calling on others to follow him, he assaulted 2 more enemy bunkers. Although those who attempted to join him became casualties, Cpl. Rosser once again exhausted his ammunition, obtained a new supply, and returning to the hilltop a third time hurled grenades into the enemy positions. During this heroic action Cpl. Rosser single-handedly killed at least 13 of the enemy. After exhausting his ammunition he accompanied the withdrawing platoon, and though himself wounded, made several trips across open terrain still under enemy fire to help remove other men injured more seriously than himself. This outstanding soldier's courageous and selfless devotion to duty is worthy of emulation by all men. He has contributed magnificently to the high traditions of the military service.

== Awards and decorations ==

Badge	Combat Infantryman Badge		
1st row	Medal of Honor		
2nd row	Purple Heart	Army Commendation Medal	Army Good Conduct Medal With 5 Good Conduct Loops
3rd row	World War II Victory Medal	Army of Occupation Medal	National Defense Service Medal
4th row	Korean Service Medal with 2 Campaign stars	United Nations Service Medal Korea	Korean War Service Medal Retroactively Awarded, 2003
Badge	Master Parachutist Badge		Glider Badge
Unit awards	Presidential Unit Citation		Korean Presidential Unit Citation

== Personal life ==
Rosser was born to John Milton and Edith Marie Riffle Rosser, he was the eldest of 17 children. He grew up in Crooksville, Ohio in a six bedroom house on Washington Street.

Rosser resided in West Palm Beach, Florida, for thirty years. While he lived in Florida he was a letter carrier for the United States Postal Service. He lived in Roseville, Ohio. He was the father of Pamela [nee Rosser] Lovell.

Rosser served on the advisory board of the Motts Military Museum in Groveport, Ohio.

Rosser died on August 26, 2020, in Bumpus Mills, Tennessee.

== See also ==
- List of Korean War Medal of Honor recipients
