= Prosser Creek =

River in California, United States

Coordinates: 39°22′13″N 120°07′01″W

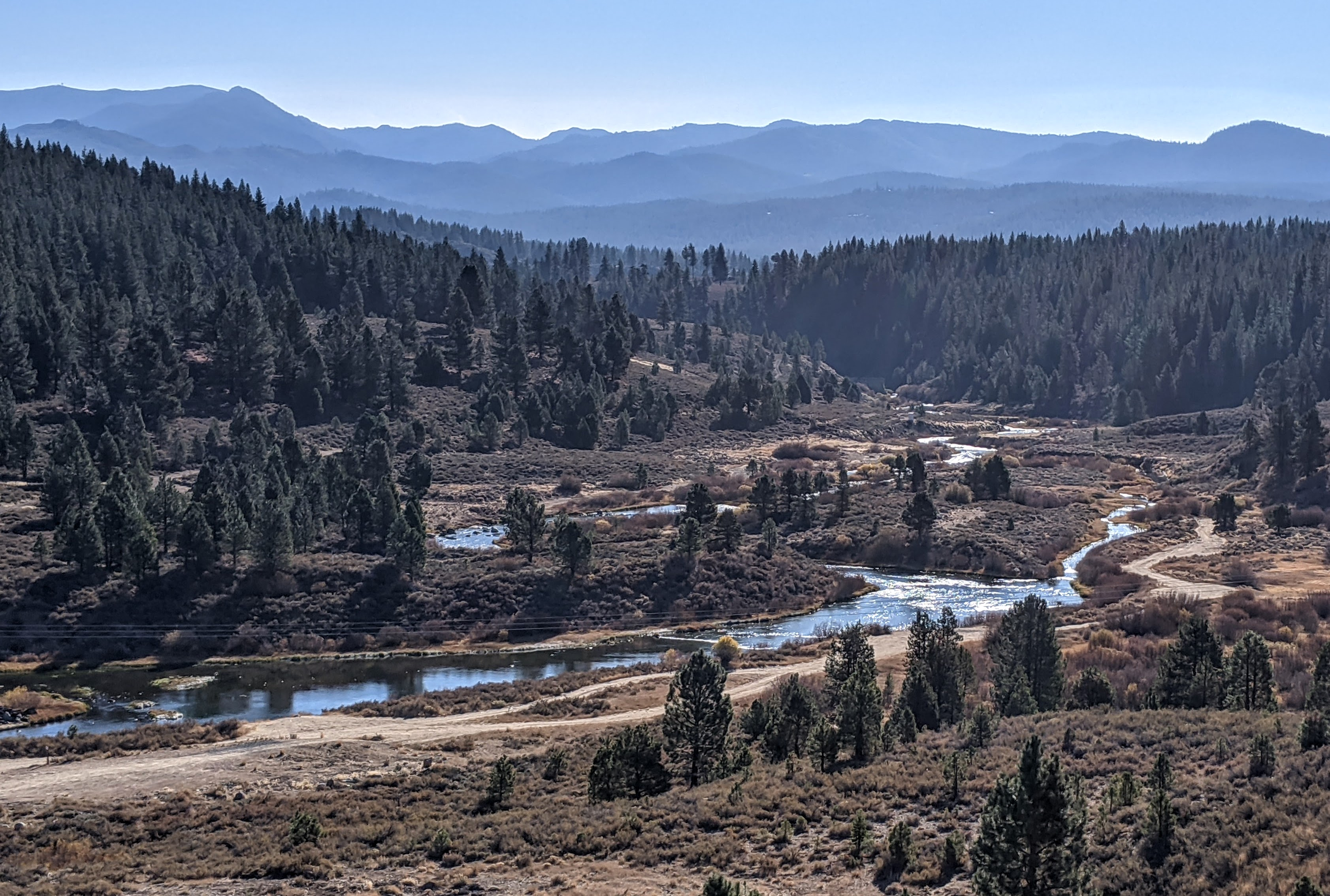
Prosser Creek view from Prosser Creek Dam

Prosser Creek is a perennial stream in Nevada County, California, formed from the North Fork Prosser Creek and South Fork Prosser Creek, then flowing into Prosser Creek Reservoir, and then to the Truckee River.

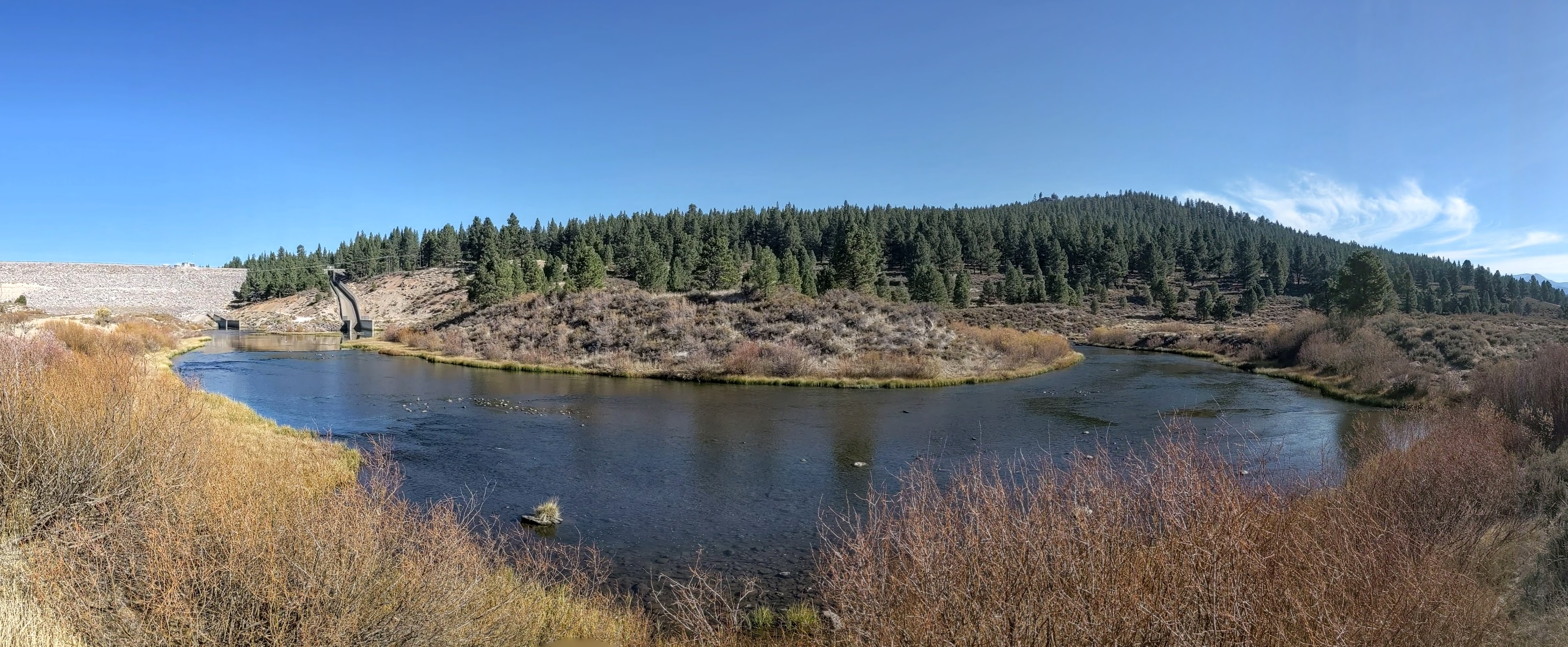
Prosser Creek panoramic view from the west bank below the Prosser Creek Dam. The dam and spillways are visible on the left.
