= Joseph Rosser =

American politician

Joseph Travis Rosser was a 19th-century American politician.

From Mankato, Minnesota, Rosser served as the Secretary of the Minnesota Territory from 1853 to 1857. Rosser was from Virginia, a lawyer, and slaveholder. He was also a delegate to the Democratic National Convention of 1860 from Minnesota.
