= List of Lake Tahoe inflow streams =

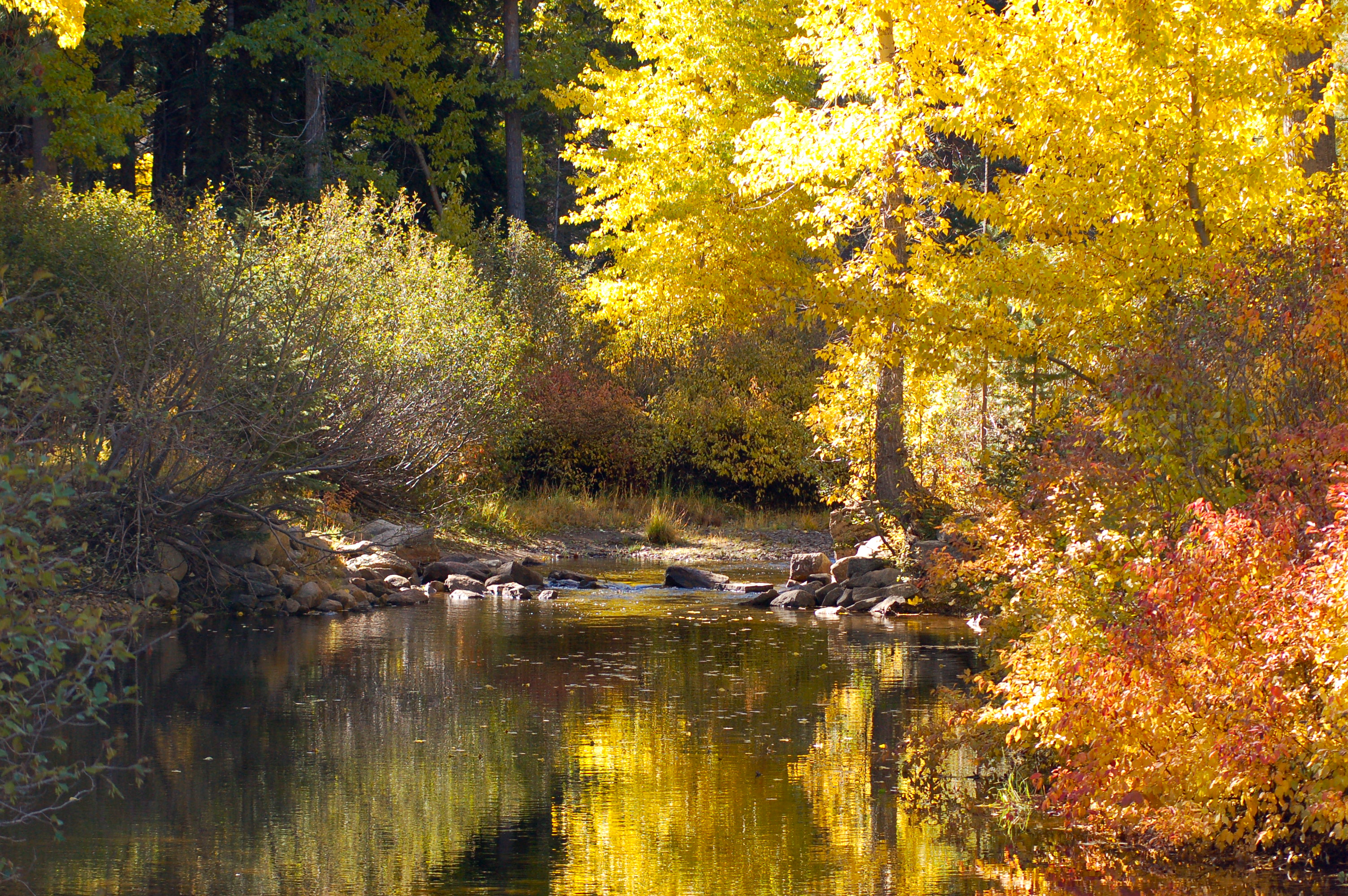
The Upper Truckee River is the largest tributary to Lake Tahoe.

Lake Tahoe inflow streams contribute 310,000 acre-feet (0.38 km^{3}) of the 530,000 acre-feet (0.65 km^{3}) of water that flows through Lake Tahoe every year. The list, below, groups rivers and creeks that flow into the lake by their locations on the north, east, south and west shores, in a clockwise order. Sub-tributaries are listed under the tributaries they feed, sorted by the elevation of the confluence so that tributaries entering nearest Lake Tahoe appear first.

Name of stream	Washo name	Course	Average flow
North shore
Burton Creek		flows through and namesake of Burton Creek State Park	
Dollar Creek	diphEkhwo'tha	flows into Lake Tahoe at Dollar Point, California	
Watson Creek		from near Mount Watson and Watson Lake, flows into Lake Tahoe at Ridgewood, near Carnelian Bay, California	
Carnelian Canyon		a short unnamed creek flows down Carnelian Canyon to Lake Tahoe at Carnelian Bay	
Tahoe Vista		Snow creek flows through Tahoe Vista to Lake Tahoe at Moon Dune Beach	
Griff Creek		flows from Martis Peak to Kings Beach	
Incline Creek	maʔgóyola	flows through Diamond Peak Ski Resort to Crystal Bay, Lake Tahoe at Incline Village	4,740 acre-feet per year (0.19 m^{3}/s)
East shore
Burke Creek		flows from south of Genoa Peak to Round Hill, Nevada	
Glenbrook Creek	dawmalá:dɨp		890 acre-feet per year (0.03 m^{3}/s)
Lincoln Creek		flows from Genoa Peak to Cave Rock	
Logan House Creek			300 acre-feet per year (0.01 m^{3}/s)
McFaul Creek		flows into Lake Tahoe at Zephyr Cove, Nevada	
Mill Creek		flows into Lake Tahoe past the Ponderosa Ranch	
Edgewood Creek	ʔlá:m wát'a	Namesake for Edgewood Golf Course	2,300 acre-feet per year (0.09 m^{3}/s)
Marlette Creek	pagác'ima	heads on Marlette Lake and runs west to Lake Tahoe	1,740 acre-feet per year (0.07 m^{3}/s)
North Canyon Creek		flows into Lake Tahoe at Deadman's Point in Glenbrook, Nevada	
Secret Harbor Creek			
Third Creek			5,630 acre-feet per year (0.22 m^{3}/s)
Tunnel Creek		flows into Lake Tahoe near Hidden Beach	
South shore
Trout Creek		originates south of Freel Peak in the Carson Range to South Lake Tahoe	25,770 acre-feet per year (1.01 m^{3}/s)
Upper Truckee River		flows from Red Lake Peak to South Lake Tahoe	71,311 acre-feet per year (2.79 m^{3}/s)
Taylor Creek	dawgašašíwa	heads in Fallen Leaf Lake and enters lake west of Camp Richardson	30,910 acre-feet per year (1.21 m^{3}/s)
Tallac Creek	debelelélek	starts on Mount Tallac and flows north to Lake Tahoe	
Cascade Creek		headwaters at near Kalmia Lake and flows into Lake Cascade then into Lake Tahoe	
Eagle Creek		headwaters at Dicks Peak and flows down Eagle Canyon into Emerald Bay and Lake Tahoe	
West shore
Rubicon Creek		headwaters at Rubicon Peak to the North and Jakes Peak to the South, and flows into Lake Tahoe near D.L. Bliss State Park	
General Creek	dukMéʔem	headwaters at Peak 8721 and flow into Lake Tahoe	11,800 acre-feet per year (0.46 m^{3}/s)
Meeks Creek		headwaters at Rubicon Lake and flows to D.L. Bliss State Park	
McKinney Creek	šuʔwélɨk	headwaters at Lily Lake; flows through McKinney Lake and into Lake Tahoe at Chambers Landing at the south end of McKinney Bay	
Quail Creek		headwaters at Quail Lake and flows into Lake Tahoe	
Homewood Creek	dúku dawot'o	headwaters at Peak 8416 and flows into Lake Tahoe	
Madden Creek		headwaters at Ellis Peak and flows into Lake Tahoe	
Blackwood Creek	dogásliʔ	headwaters at Peak 8652 and flow down into Lake Tahoe	26,280 acre-feet per year (1.03 m^{3}/s)
Ward Creek	dagásliʔ	headwaters at Peak 8521 and flow down Ward canyon into Lake Tahoe	18,390 acre-feet per year (0.72 m^{3}/s)

== See also ==
- List of rivers of California
- List of rivers of Nevada
- List of rivers of the Great Basin
