= Ward Creek =

There are dozens of streams or places named Ward Creek, 69 of which are in the United States, according to the USGS GNIS.

- Ward Creek (Alameda County), California
- Ward Creek (Lake Tahoe)
- Ward Creek (Rogue River tributary), a stream in Oregon
