= Burke Creek =

Burke Creek Friday Creek
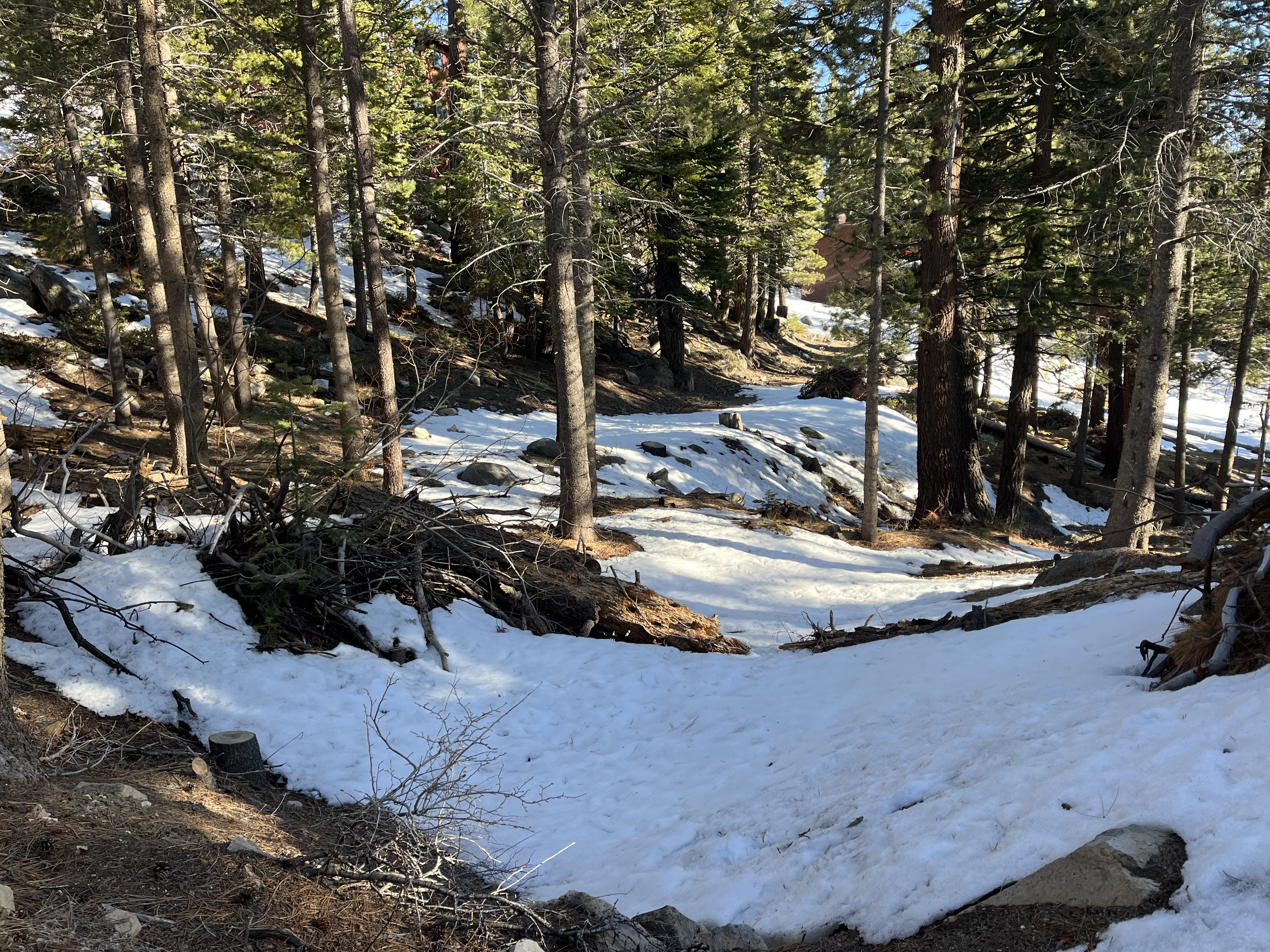

- Location of the mouth of Burke Creek at Round Hill, Nevada

Location
- Country: United States
- State: Nevada
- Region: Douglas County

Physical characteristics
- Source: South of Genoa Peak in the Carson Range east of Lake Tahoe
  - coordinates: 38°59′51″N 119°53′45″W
  - elevation: 7,801 ft (2,378 m)
- Mouth: Lake Tahoe
  - location: Round Hill Village, Nevada
  - coordinates: 38°58′36″N 119°57′6″W
  - elevation: 6,286 ft (1,916 m)

Burke Creek is a westward-flowing stream originating south of Genoa Peak in the Carson Range of the Sierra Nevada in Douglas County, Nevada, United States. It is tributary to the southeastern shore of Lake Tahoe at Round Hill Village, Nevada.

== History ==
The Washoe people camped along Burke Creek as evidenced by a mortar site near its mouth.

Burke Creek was named for Martin K. "Friday" Burke who built a log cabin along an improved Washoe game path that wound along the lakeshore towards Cave Rock. Burke started the first commercial fishing business on Lake Tahoe, known as Burke & Company, which drew seine nets 600 yards long over the Lahontan cutthroat trout (Oncorhynchus henshawi) spawning beds, "taking occasionally a thousand pounds per night". The creek was also known as Friday Creek.

== Watershed ==
Burke Creek originates south of Genoa Peak in the Carson Range of the Sierra Nevada, upstream from Castle Rock and the Tahoe Rim Trail in Kingsbury, Nevada. This is located north of where Castle Rock Road becomes Genoa Peak Road. Burke Creek is joined by several unnamed tributaries and as it descends westerly towards Lake Tahoe forms the northern border of Kingsbury. After crossing U.S. Route 50, the southern route of the Lincoln Highway, it forms the border between Round Hill Village and Stateline, Nevada, flowing through Rabe Meadow before entering Lake Tahoe in Round Hill.

== Ecology ==
North American beaver (Castor canadensis) inhabit Jennings Pond on Burke Creek in Rabe Meadow. Beaver are historically native to the Sierra Nevada. Not only have aspen and cottonwood survived ongoing beaver colonization but a recent study of ten Tahoe streams utilizing aerial multispectral videography has shown that deciduous, thick herbaceous, and thin herbaceous vegetation are more highly concentrated near beaver dams, whereas coniferous trees are decreased. Benefits of beaver dams include removal of sediment and excessive pollutants travelling downstream, which improves lake clarity, which was shown to worsen recently when beaver dams were removed in two Lake Tahoe tributary streams.

== See also ==
- List of Lake Tahoe inflow streams
- Beaver in the Sierra Nevada
