= Incline Creek =

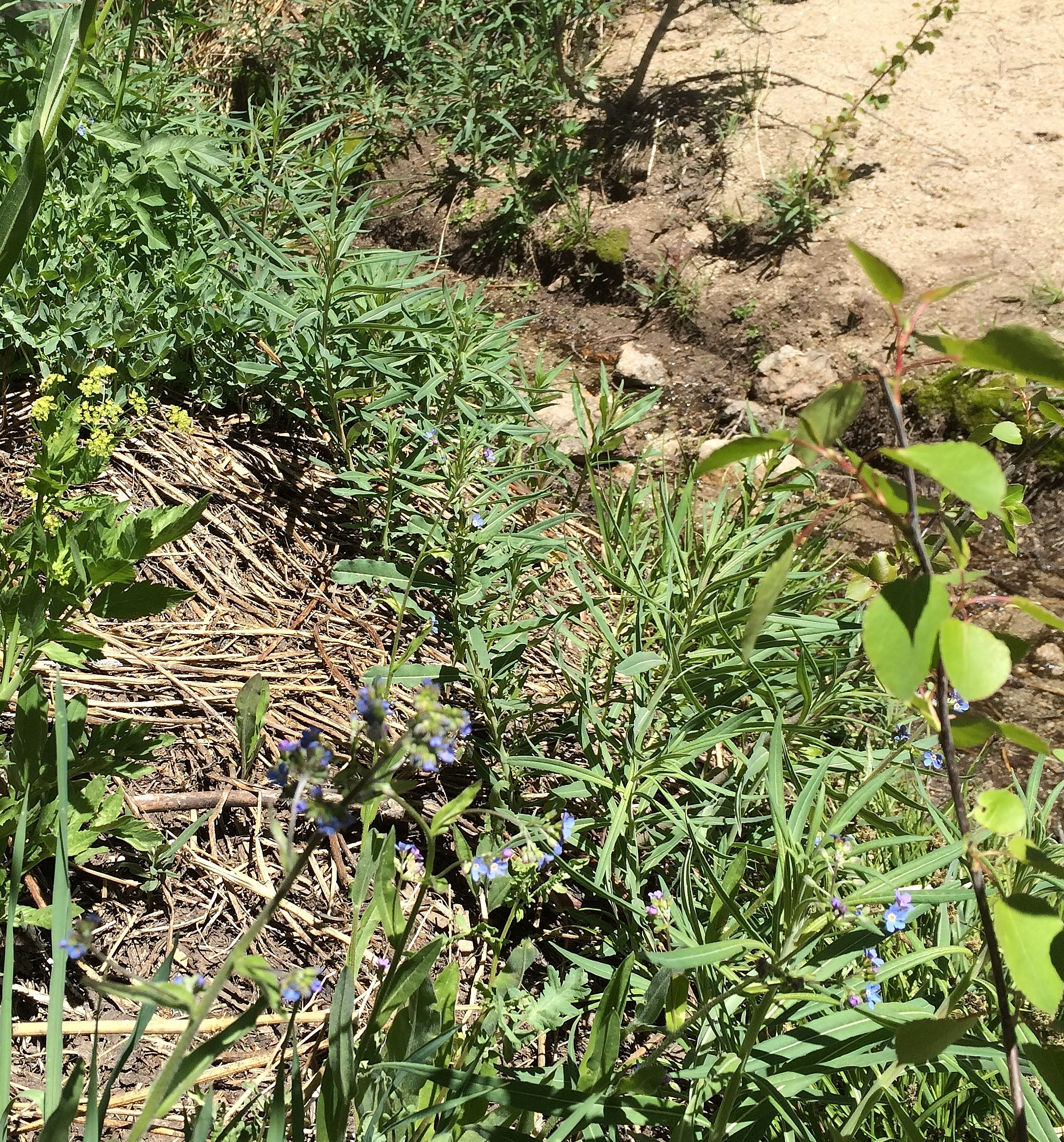
- Rivulet near the source of Incline Creek just above Tahoe Rim Trail east of Highway 431 with Jessica's stickseed (Hackelia micrantha) blue flowers.

- Location within Nevada
- Native name: ma' goiyatwO'tha (Washo)

Location
- Country: United States
- State: Nevada
- Region: Washoe County

Physical characteristics
- Source
  - location: Carson Range, Sierra Nevada in western Nevada, United States
  - coordinates: 39°17′24″N 119°54′09″W
  - elevation: 8,904 ft (2,714 m)
- Mouth: Washoe Lake
  - coordinates: 39°14′19″N 119°56′51″W
  - elevation: 6,234 ft (1,900 m)

Incline Creek is a 5.2-mile (8.4 km) southward-flowing stream originating in the Carson Range, Sierra Nevada in the northeast Lake Tahoe Basin in Washoe County in western Nevada. Incline Creek flows through the Diamond Peak Ski Area on the way to Incline Village where it empties into Lake Tahoe.

== History ==
Incline Creek, like Incline Village, is named for the inclined railroad built by H. Sam Marlette and Walter Scott Hobart. This railroad hauled the cut lumber from their lumber mill on Mill Creek, and Lake Tahoe, Tahoe. The Incline Railroad dated back to 1875, and carried the lumber up to a wooden flume that floated the lumber east, down the flume, for transport on the V+T Railroad. The cut lumber was used in Virginia City and Carson City mines, and for home and commercial construction.

== Watershed and course ==
Incline Creek is part of the Lake Tahoe/Truckee River watershed. Like Third Creek, it deposits heavy sediment loads into Lake Tahoe.

== Recreation ==
The Folsom Camp Loop is a relatively easy 6.2 miles (10.0 km) trail that begins at Diamond Peak Resort and ascends along Incline Creek to historic Folsom Camp before returning on the other side of the creek. The historic camp is named for lumberman Gilman Folsom, who with Sam Marlette, employed 400 Chinese laborers cutting timber for use in Virginia City.

== See also ==
- List of Lake Tahoe inflow streams
