= Blackwood Creek =

Blackwood Creek may refer to:

- Blackwood Creek (California), a tributary of Lake Tahoe along the Sierra Crest
- Blackwood Creek, Tasmania, a community in the Division of Lyons
