= Beaver in the Sierra Nevada =

Wildlife indigenous to California mountains

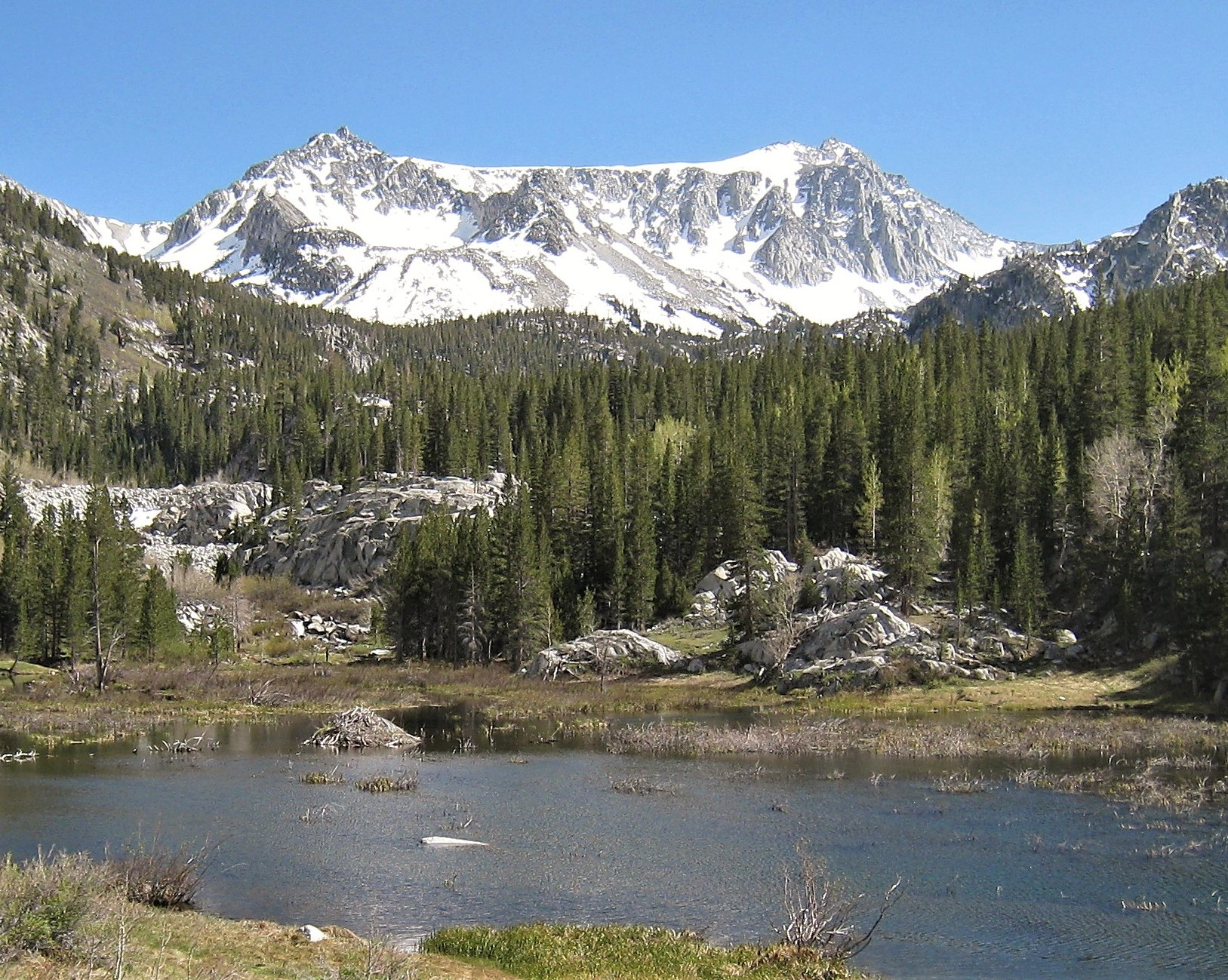
A beaver lodge in McGee Creek, eastern Sierra Nevada, California.

The North American beaver (Castor canadensis) had a historic range that overlapped the Sierra Nevada in California. Before the European colonization of the Americas, beaver were distributed from the arctic tundra to the deserts of northern Mexico. The California Golden beaver subspecies (Castor canadensis subauratus) was prevalent in the Sacramento and San Joaquin River watersheds, including their tributaries in the Sierra Nevada. Recent evidence indicates that beaver were native to the High Sierra until their extirpation in the nineteenth century.

== Historical range and distribution ==
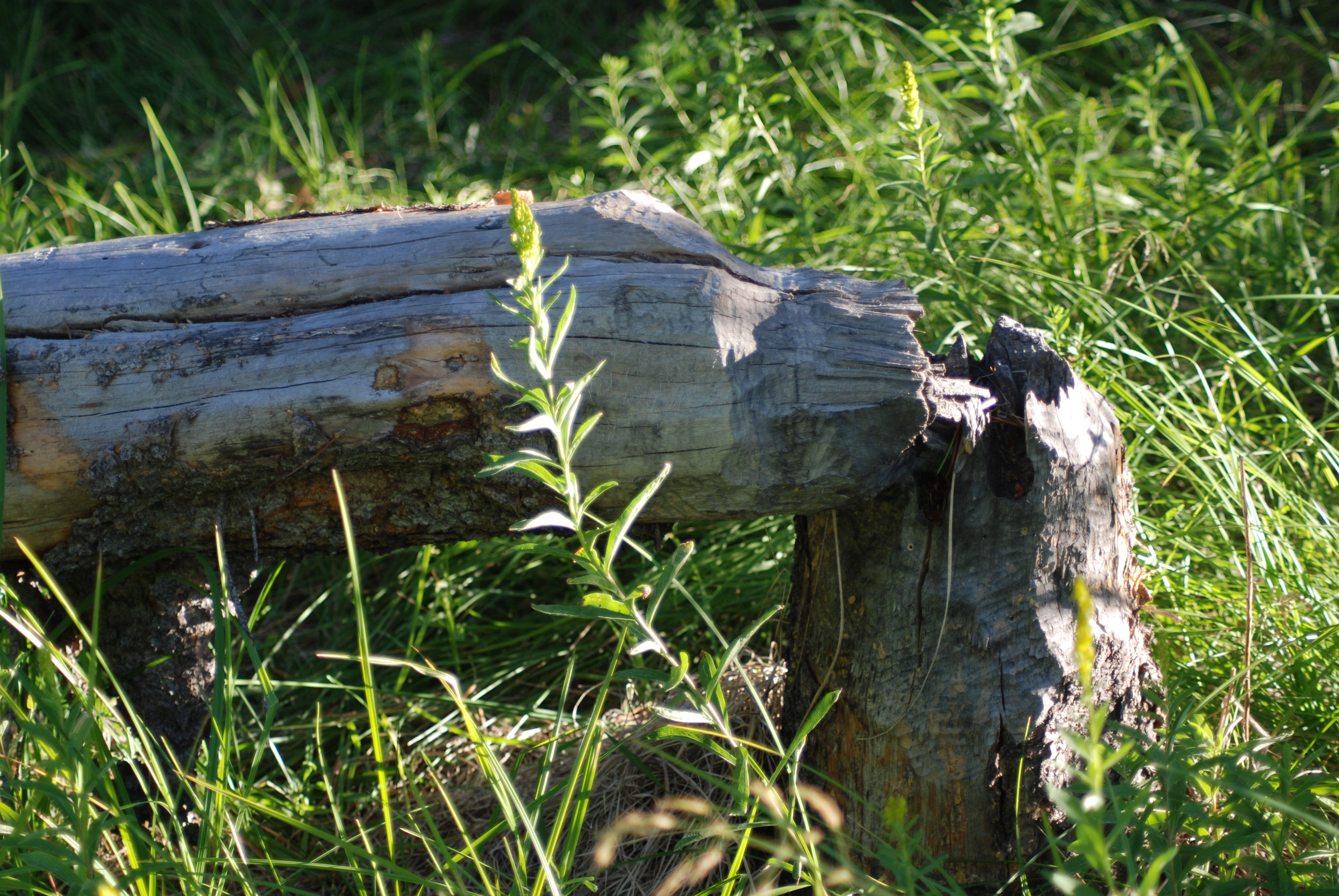
A conifer felled by beaver on Meeks Creek, Lake Tahoe August, 2010

In 1916, Harold Bryant wrote in California Fish and Game, "The beaver of our mountain districts has been entirely exterminated and there are but a few hundred survivors to be found along the Sacramento, Colorado and San Joaquin Rivers." Earlier, in 1906, Frank Stephens wrote in "California Mammals" that Castor canadensis' historic range was from the "Pacific slope from Alaska to central California east to and including the Sierra Nevada and Cascade Mountains" and adds "In most parts of California the presence of beavers is only made known by the stumps of the trees and saplings that they have cut." McIntyre hypothesized that beaver were trapped out of the Sierra early in the nineteenth century by trappers before records could be kept. Other early twentieth century naturalists (Grinnell, Tappe, etc.) questioned whether the California Golden beaver dwelt above 1,000 feet (300 m) of elevation in the Sierra. In 2012, physical evidence demonstrated that beaver were native to the Sierra until at least the mid-nineteenth century, via radiocarbon dating of buried beaver dam wood uncovered by deep channel incision in two locations in Red Clover Creek in the Feather River watershed. That report was supported by a summary of indirect evidence of beaver including reliable observer accounts of beaver in multiple watersheds from the northern to the southern Sierra Nevada, including its eastern slope.

=== Reintroduction to the Sierra ===
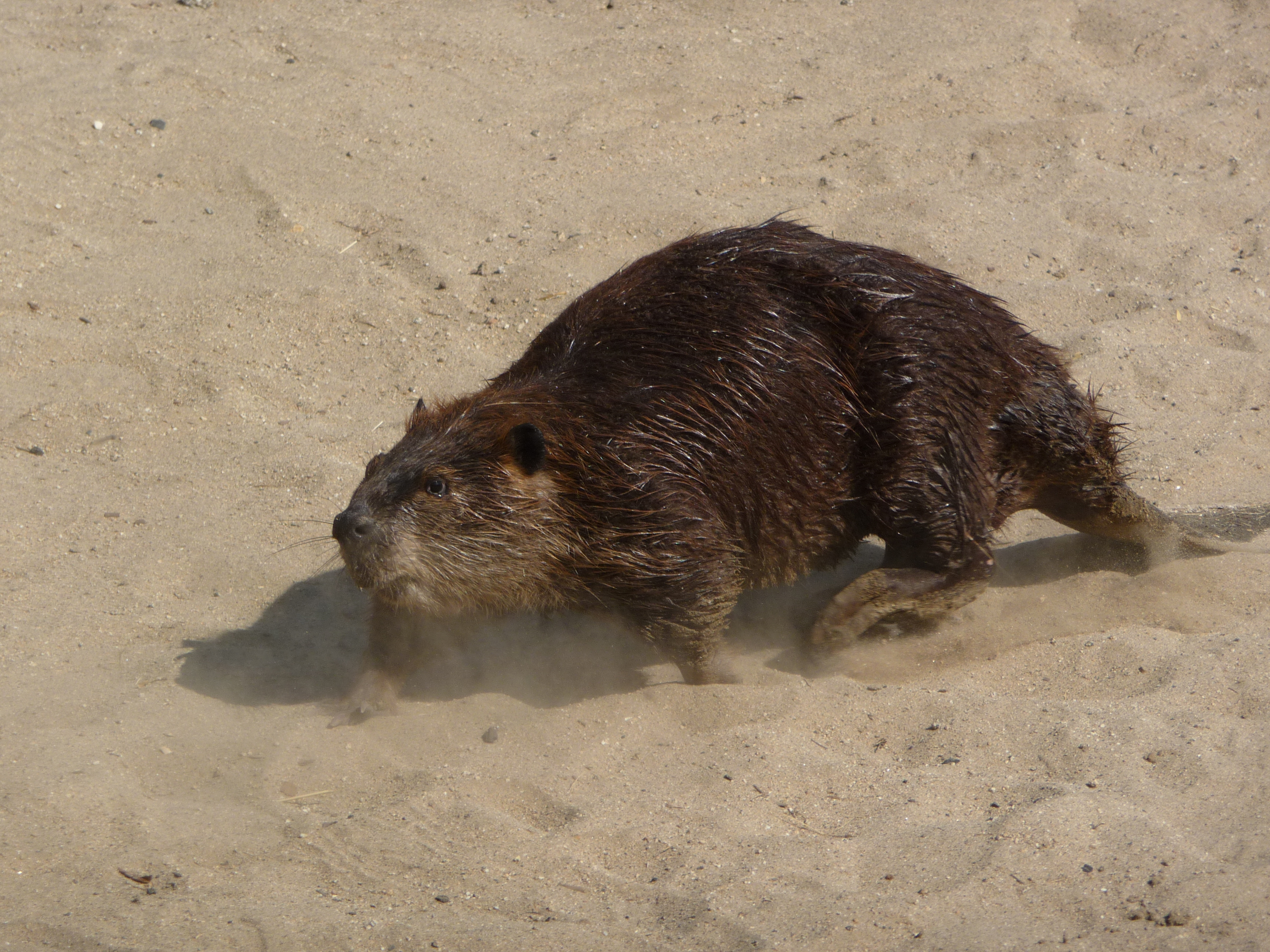
North American beaver on the bank of the Lower Kern River

California Golden beaver taken from Snelling, California (elevation 256 ft or 78 m and Waterford, California (elevation 51 ft or 16 m) were stocked in 1940 at Mather Station (elevation 4,522 ft or 1,378 m) west of Yosemite National Park and in 1944 at Fish Camp (elevation 5,062 ft or 1,543 m) by the California Department of Fish and Game (CDFG). These native "Central Valley" beaver have been building dams and rearing young successfully for 70 years in and near Yosemite at elevations higher than 5,000 feet (1,500 m). A second reference confirms that the CDFG re-introductions of beaver into Mariposa County in the Merced River watershed were all C. C. subauratus (Golden beaver) taken from near sea level elevations. These lowland beaver adapted to the high Sierra without difficulty.

Castor canadensis were re-introduced to the Tahoe Basin by the CDFG and the U. S. Forest Service between 1934 and 1949 in order to prevent stream degradation and to promote wetland restoration. Descended from no more than nine individuals from the Snake River in Idaho, 1987 beaver populations on the upper and lower Truckee River had reached a density of 0.72 colonies (3.5 beavers) per kilometer.

== Ecology ==
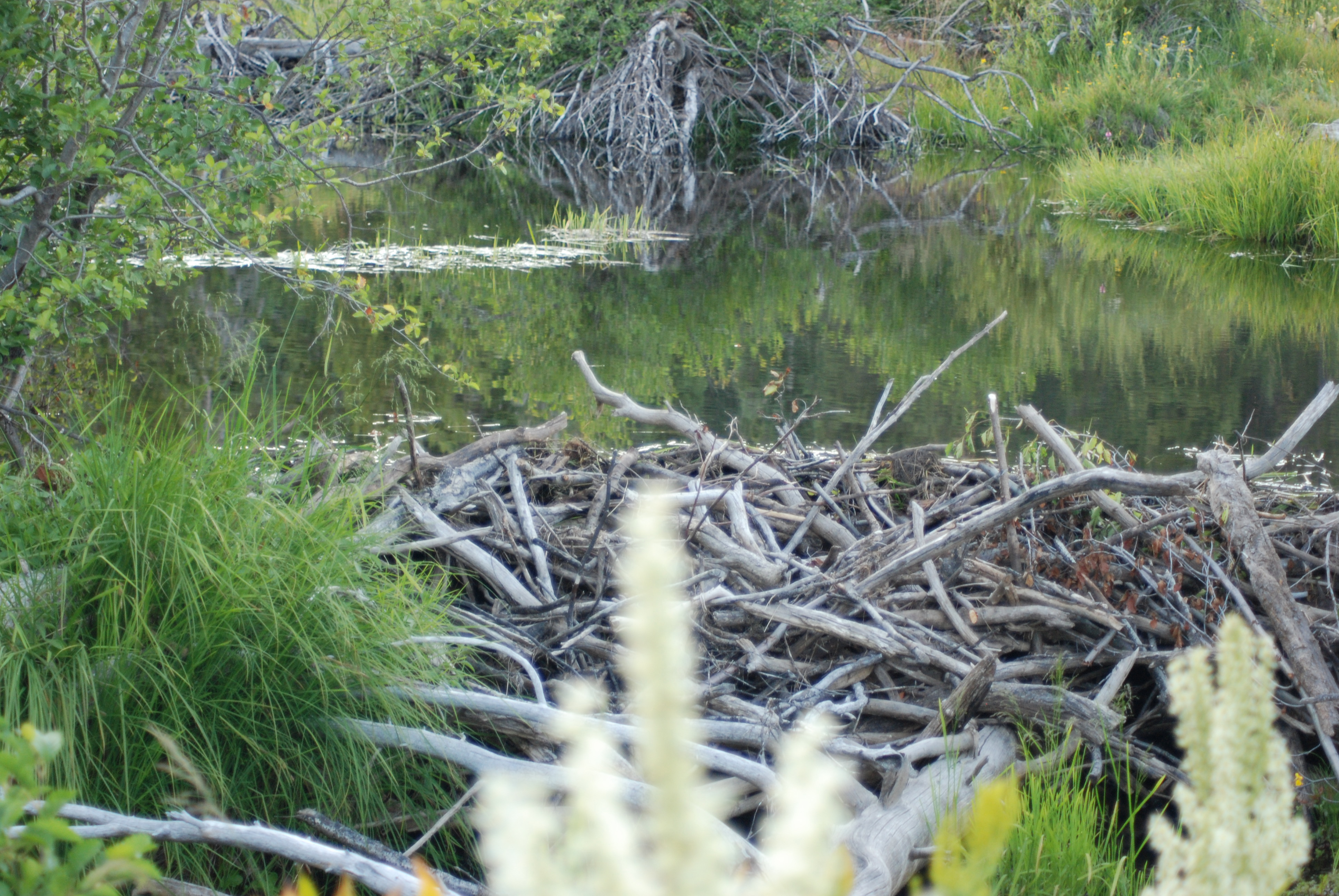
A beaver dam on Meeks Creek, Lake Tahoe August, 2010

Beaver have been documented in the upper and lower Truckee River, Ward Creek, Cold Creek, Taylor Creek, Meeks Creek, Blackwood Creek, and King's Beach, so the descendants of the original nine beavers have apparently migrated around most of Lake Tahoe. A 2007 study of Taylor Creek showed that the beaver dam removal decreased wetland habitat, increased stream flow, and increased total phosphorus pollutants entering Lake Tahoe - all factors which negatively impact the clarity of the lake's water. In addition, beaver dams located in Ward Creek, located on the west shore of Lake Tahoe, were also shown to decrease nutrients and sediments traveling downstream.

=== Effects on aspen, cottonwood and willow ===
In 1987, Beier reported that beaver had caused local extinction of Quaking aspen (Populus tremuloides) and Black cottonwood (Populus trichocarpa) on 4-5% of stream reaches on the lower Truckee River, however Willow (Salix spp.) showed good vigor despite heavy use in most reaches. He further speculated that without control of beaver populations that aspen and cottonwood could go extinct on the Truckee River. However, not only have aspen and cottonwood survived ongoing beaver colonization but a recent study of ten Tahoe streams utilizing aerial multispectral videography has shown that deciduous, thick herbaceous, and thin herbaceous vegetation are more highly concentrated near beaver dams, whereas coniferous trees are decreased.

=== Effects on salmonids ===
Until recently, beaver were considered pests who caused flooding and impaired the passage of spawning trout and salmon. However, it has been shown that trout and salmon move freely across beaver dams. The presence of beaver dams has also been shown to either increase the number of fish, their size, or both, in a study of brook, rainbow and brown trout in Sagehen Creek, which flows into the Little Truckee River at an altitude of 5,800 feet (1,800 m).

=== Beaver control ===
As of 2023, the California Department of Fish and Game recognizes the ecosystem services provided by beavers across the state. In cases where beavers are harming human property, the DFG will first attempt to educate the human party, and only then issue a limited permit to kill the beaver.

== See also ==
- California Fur Rush
- Mountain beaver
- Martinez, California beavers
- Ecology of the Sierra Nevada
