= Glenridge =

Glenridge may refer to:

- Glenridge, a community in the city of St. Catharines, Ontario, Canada
- Glenridge Middle School, a public middle school in Orlando, Florida, Florida, United States

== See also ==
- Glen Ridge (disambiguation)
- Glenridge Park, California
