= Glen Ridge =

Glen Ridge may refer to:

- Glen Ridge, Florida, United States
- Glen Ridge, New Jersey, United States
  - Glen Ridge High School
  - Glen Ridge (NJT station)

== See also ==
- Glenridge (disambiguation)
