= Griff Creek =

Griff Creek San Antonio Creek
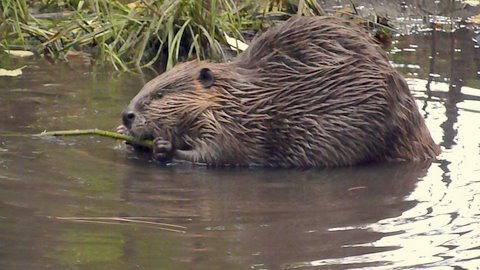
- Griff Creek Beaver in October, 2010

- Location of Griff Creek in California

Location
- Country: United States
- State: California
- Region: Placer County
- City: Kings Beach

Physical characteristics
- Source: Martis Peak
  - location: Sierra Nevada
  - coordinates: 39°17′25″N 120°01′09″W
  - elevation: 8,390 ft (2,560 m)
- Mouth: Lake Tahoe
  - location: Kings Beach, California
  - coordinates: 39°14′13″N 120°01′49″W
  - elevation: 6,234 ft (1,900 m)

Griff Creek is a southward-flowing stream originating on Martis Peak in Placer County, California, United States. It culminates in north Lake Tahoe at Kings Beach, California.

== History ==
The Washo used the meadow where Griff Creek enters Lake Tahoe "as a resting spot, but not a full-fledged campsite". The name Griff may derive from Griffin's Mill, a sawmill where a creek entered the Lake near Agate Bay.

== Beaver controversy ==
In November, 2009 a California Golden beaver family was caught in snares underwater and drowned in Griff Creek, a stream in Kings Beach, California, when Placer County Department of Public Works ordered their removal for fear that the beaver would cause flooding. Recent studies of two other Lake Tahoe tributaries, Taylor Creek and Ward Creek, showed that beaver dam removal decreased wetland habitat, increased stream flow, and increased total phosphorus pollutants entering Lake Tahoe - all factors which negatively impact the clarity of the lake's water.(United States Geological Survey 2002) Beavers develop wetland areas which trap sediments and improve water quality. Flow devices such as "Beaver Deceivers" are often used to control water heights in beaver ponds instead of killing beavers, as the latter is typically only a temporary remedy, for beavers recolonize prime habitat quickly. In fact, in October 2010 Placer County officials again killed the new beaver family at King's Beach only to have schoolchildren protest and suggest more contemporary management solutions. According to Placer County officials there were four beavers who built three dams on Griff Creek, and they were killed by sharpshooters licensed by the county in a night operation. The Tahoe Regional Planning Agency stated that "removing beavers is not uncommon at Lake Tahoe" but "the county could have 'easily' removed the beaver dam in a more conscientious manner, thus preventing sediment naturally filtered by the dam from reaching Lake Tahoe". Cheryl Millham, executive director of Lake Tahoe Wildlife Care, argued that the culverts on Griff Creek could easily be protected from damming with fencing and that "municipalities all over the United States have learned to peacefully co-exist with these animals". Depredation is likely a temporary solution as the county has had to kill beaver families two years in a row and Peter Kraatz, deputy director of the Placer County Department of Public Works, conceded that the area is "perfect habitat for beavers".

== See also ==
- Kings Beach, California
- Beaver in the Sierra Nevada
- North American beaver
