= Tahoe Keys, California =

Tahoe Keys
- Neighborhood of South Lake Tahoe
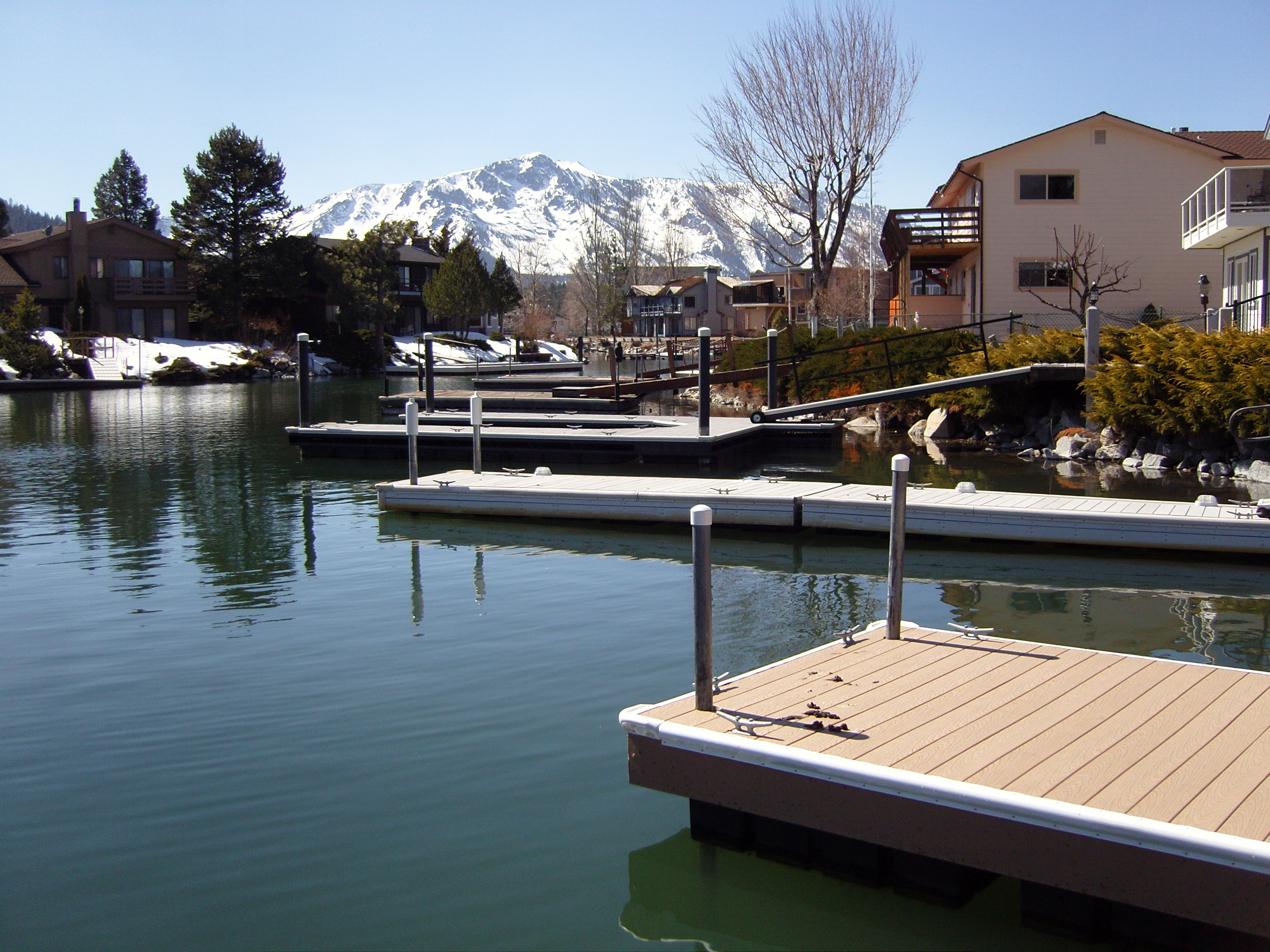
- Nickname: The Keys
- Location in California
- Coordinates: 38°55′54″N 120°00′49″W
- Country: United States
- State: California
- County: El Dorado County
- City: South Lake Tahoe
- Elevation: 6,240 ft (1,902 m)

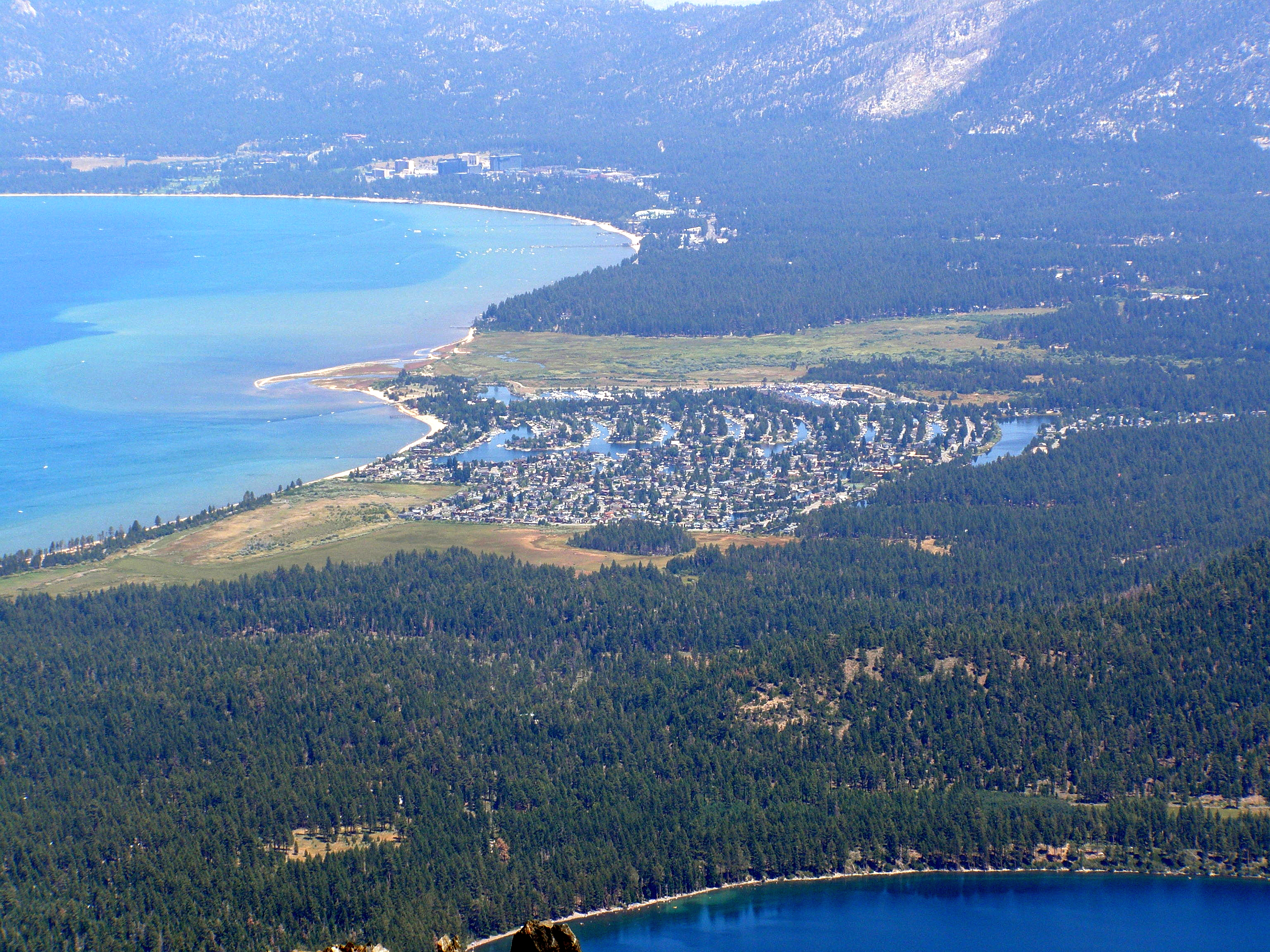
View from Mount Tallac

Tahoe Keys is a private waterfront community within the city of South Lake Tahoe in El Dorado County, California. It lies at an elevation of 6,240 feet (1,900 m). The Tahoe Keys is a 740-acre (300 ha) marina community laced with eleven miles of inland waterways located at the southern tip of Lake Tahoe in South Lake Tahoe, California. Most of the 1500+ members who own homes, townhouses or vacant lots have a private boat dock and are located on numerous lagoons, canals or the Tahoe Keys Marina with its boat launching ramps.

== Ecology ==
Constructed in the 1960s, the community consists of over 1,500 homes adjacent to a series of canals. Its construction destroyed half of the Upper Truckee Marsh, the primary filter for river water entering the lake, and has since been called the most environmentally damaging intrusion on the lakeshore in Lake Tahoe's human history.

Due to lack of maintenance and poor planning, the community has the largest population of non-native plants and fish in Lake Tahoe. The problem is severe enough that the most common control methods have failed. As a result there has been discussion about whether to make special allowances for otherwise banned herbicides in Lake Tahoe.

In 2025, 43 acres of small trees, brush and woody debris was turned into mulch to reduce fire danger.
