= Dardanelles and Freel Roadless Areas =

- IUCN category VI (protected area with sustainable use of natural resources)
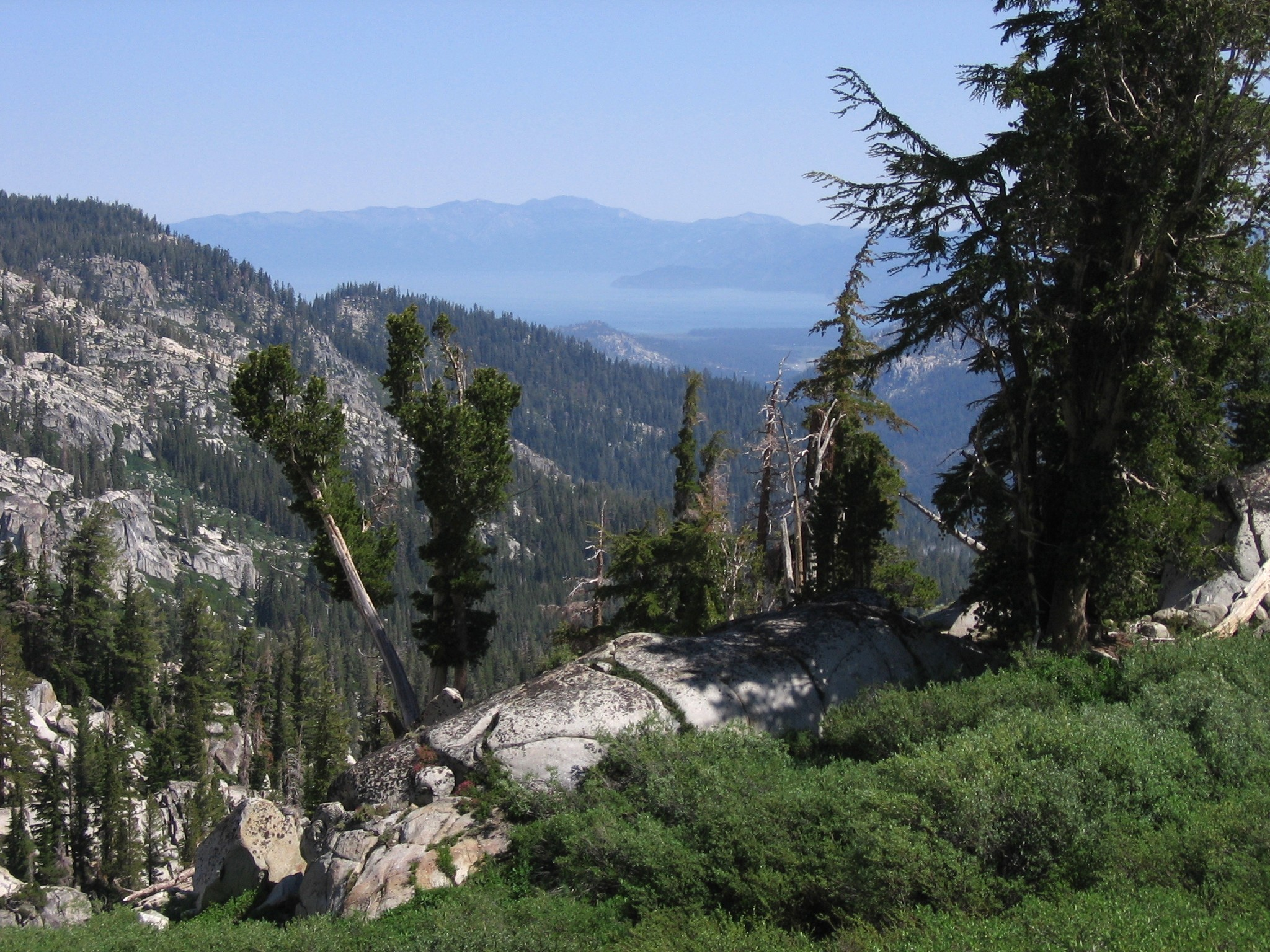
- Near Showers Lake in the Dardanelles Roadless Area

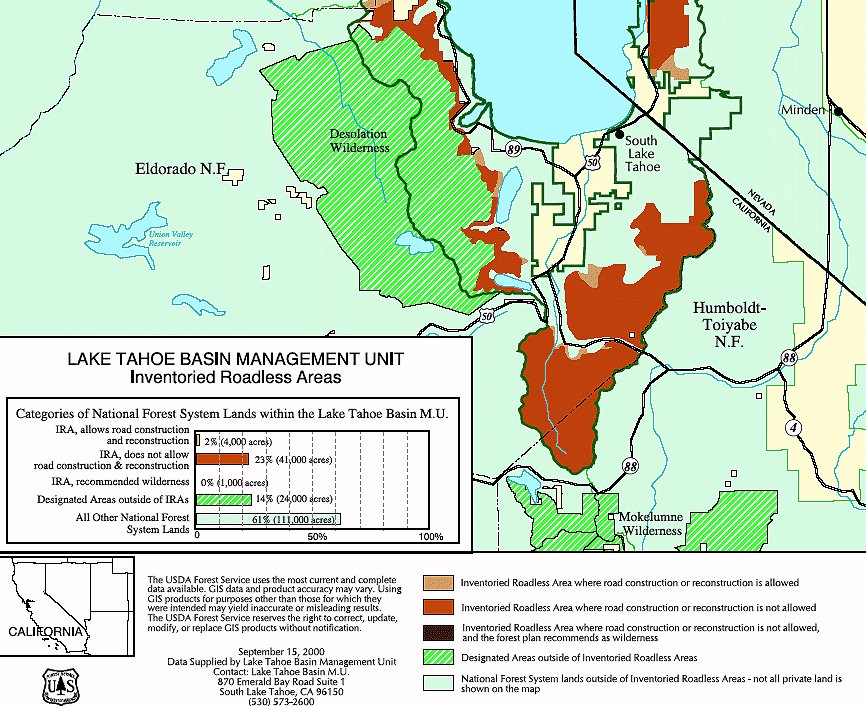
- USDA map of inventoried roadless areas in southern Lake Tahoe.
- Location: South of Lake Tahoe, Eldorado County, northern California.
- Nearest city: South Lake Tahoe, California
- Governing body: Lake Tahoe Basin Management Unit / USDA

The Dardanelles and Freel Roadless Areas are located 7 miles (11 km) and 3 miles (4.8 km), respectively, south of Lake Tahoe, California, and both are managed by the Lake Tahoe Basin Management Unit of the US Forest Service.These areas are contiguous, separated only by the corridor of highway 89. The historic Hawley Grade, an immigrant wagon road, now a hiking trail, is within the Dardanelles Roadless Area, as well as the watershed of Lake Tahoe's largest inflow, the Upper Truckee River.

The Freel Roadless Area is named for Freel Peak, the highest point in both the Lake Tahoe Basin and the Carson Range. Freel Peak supports one of the few areas of alpine cushion plants this far north in the Sierra Nevada/Carson Range. Both the Pacific Crest Trail and the Tahoe Rim Trail pass through these roadless areas.

"Roadless area" is the designation for backcountry, undeveloped lands having wilderness attributes as specified in the Wilderness Act of 1964 and that could be considered for inclusion in the National Wilderness Preservation System. These lands were formally inventoried in the Roadless Area Review and Evaluation process (RARE II) and managed under the land management plans of the US Forest Service. On Jan. 12, 2001, the Roadless Area Conservation Rule was established. This rule set national guidelines limiting backcountry timber harvest and road construction and reconstruction with a goal of upholding the roadless characteristics found on millions of acres of inventoried roadless areas. It allowed reasonable exceptions for management activities like fire suppression and other public health safety measures, and permitted projects, such as mining, with valid existing rights to proceed. At the same time, the national roadless rule attempted to conserve fish and wildlife habitat while not closing any existing access to these lands.

== Dardanelles Roadless Area ==
This 14,500-acre (59 km^{2}) set aside is managed as a nonwilderness, nonmotorized roadless recreation area and is second only to nearby Desolation Wilderness in popularity in the Lake Tahoe region. Often called "Meiss Country" after the local ranching family whose historic Meiss cabin, built in 1878, still stands in the Upper Truckee Basin area.

Lake Tahoe and its primary inflow, the Upper Truckee River, occupy a basin that is between the split crest of the Sierra Nevada Range, with the eastern crest extending north to become the Carson Range and the main crest heading northwest. The Upper Truckee River headwaters begin in a 2,000-foot (610 m) thick assemblage of volcanic rock at Stevens Peak.

The Dardanelles Roadless Area's highest features are Stevens (10,043 ft) and Red Lake peaks (10,060 ft). These peaks are the highest in northern California that are composed of mudflow breccia (conglomerate). Stevens Peak was named in 1889 for J. M. Stevens, a local county supervisor who operated a stage coach station in nearby Hope Valley in the 1860s.

The area has subalpine meadows, lodgepole pine stands, krummholz mats of whitebark pine, and stratified volcanic peaks and ridges.

The Pacific Crest Trail traverses the area between Carson Pass and Echo Summit.

=== Hawley Grade ===
This trail began as an immigrant wagon road, the first road built across the central Sierra mountains. Asa Hawley, in the spring of 1854, established a trading post in Lake Valley near the Upper Truckee River's canyon wall that became known as Hawley's Hill. Construction began for a wagon road as the grade was gentle enough to safely travel, unlike the existing Carson Grade, where block and tackle had to be used to get the wagons over into Lake Valley. The new route was completed in 1857 and further improvements were done by El Dorado and Sacramento counties. Hawley's Grade was, for a short time, the route to take. Built to convey miners and the like to the Mother Lode country, the Hawley Grade was a reverse route as well when the 1859 discovery of silver happened in Nevada territory. As the Hawley Grade's purpose was to bypass the steeper road, so the Hawley Grade was itself bypassed in favor of an even shorter path, the wagon-and-stage toll road down Meyers Grade (today's highway 50), completed in 1860.

A portion of the old road, now a hiking trail, can be hiked all the way to State highway 50, one and one-half miles, with an elevation gain of less than 1,000 feet (300 m). The trailhead begins at the boulder-blocked dead end of a spur road from Upper Truckee Road. It begins near the Upper Truckee River, then turns northward through vegetation of Jeffrey pine, huckleberry oak, alder and bracket fern. Also growing is the toxic dogbane, or Indian hemp, used by Native Americans in basket-weaving and for bowstrings. The trail has views of Lake Tahoe, Highway 50 (Meyers Grade), the town of South Lake Tahoe and volcanic cliffs of Round Top mountain, south of the trail.

== Freel Roadless Area ==
This nonwilderness, nonmotorized recreation area is more than 15,000 acres (61 km^{2}) in size. It is located along the crest and northwest slopes of the Carson Range, bounded on the south by highway 89 and Grass Lake, with Thompson Peak at the southeast corner, then northward to Freel Peak and Star Lake with the Tahoe Rim Trail the eastern boundary. The area is named for Freel Peak, which rises to 10,843 feet elevation and is both the highest point in the Lake Tahoe Basin and in the Carson Range. Of the few lakes in the area, Star Lake is at the highest elevation, 9,100 feet (2,800 m). (Mud Lake is actually higher at 9,239 feet (2,816 m), but is an aptly named, fishfree lakelet.) The forest is mixed conifer of fir and pine, mountain hemlock, and krummholtz mats of whitebark pine. Freel Peak has one of the few areas of alpine cushion plants this far north in the Sierra Nevada/Carson Range area.

The Tahoe Rim Trail's length is more than 22 miles (35 km) through this roadless area and includes the trail's highest elevation point of 9,730 feet (2,970 m). This trail section is very popular with bicyclists during the summer months.
Freel Peak was named in 1874 by William Eimbeck, a surveyor, for James Freel, who was a settler at the base of the mountain.

The largest private inholding of the Lake Tahoe Basin area, the Trimmer Ranch, is within the Freel area.
