= Kings Beach, California =

- census-designated place
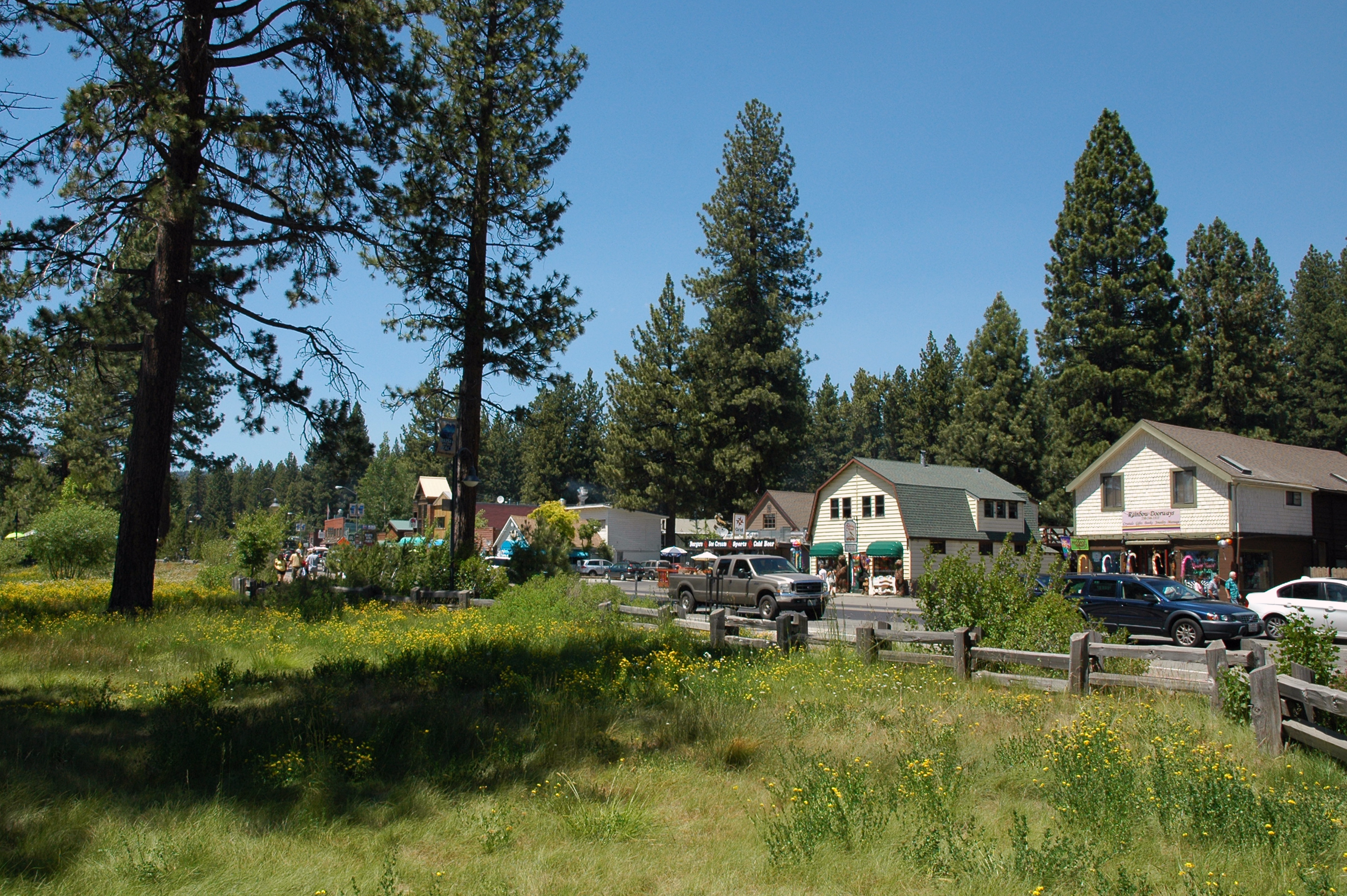
- Downtown Kings Beach, 2011

- Location in Placer County and the state of California

- Location in the United States
- Coordinates: 39°15′05″N 120°01′23″W
- Country: United States
- State: California
- County: Placer

Government
  - State Senator: Marie Alvarado-Gil (R)
  - Assemblymember: Heather Hadwick (R)
  - U.S. Congress: Kevin Kiley (I)

Area
  - Total: 2.975 sq mi (7.705 km^{2})
  - Land: 2.859 sq mi (7.404 km^{2})
  - Water: 0.116 sq mi (0.301 km^{2}) 3.91%
- Elevation: 6,444 ft (1,964 m)

Population (2020)
  - Total: 3,563
  - Density: 1,246/sq mi (481.2/km^{2})
- Time zone: UTC-8 (PST)
  - Summer (DST): UTC-7 (PDT)
- ZIP code: 96143
- Area codes: 530, 837
- FIPS code: 06-38548
- GNIS feature ID: 2408481

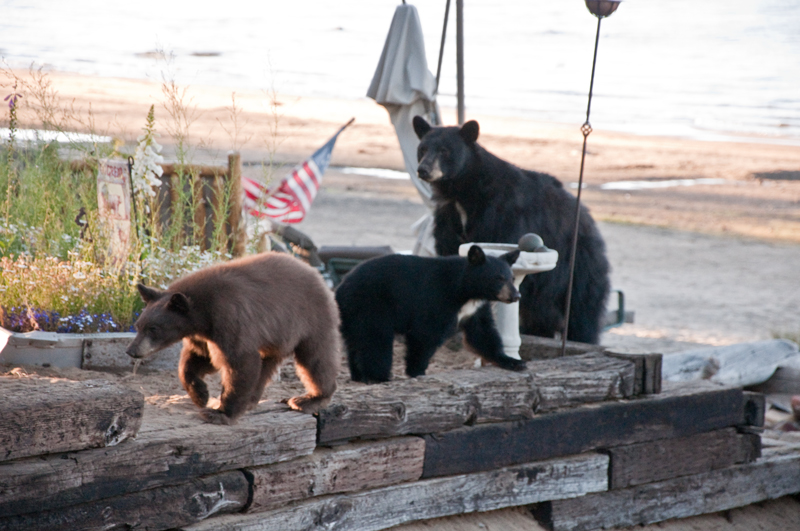
Bears at Kings Beach, August 2010

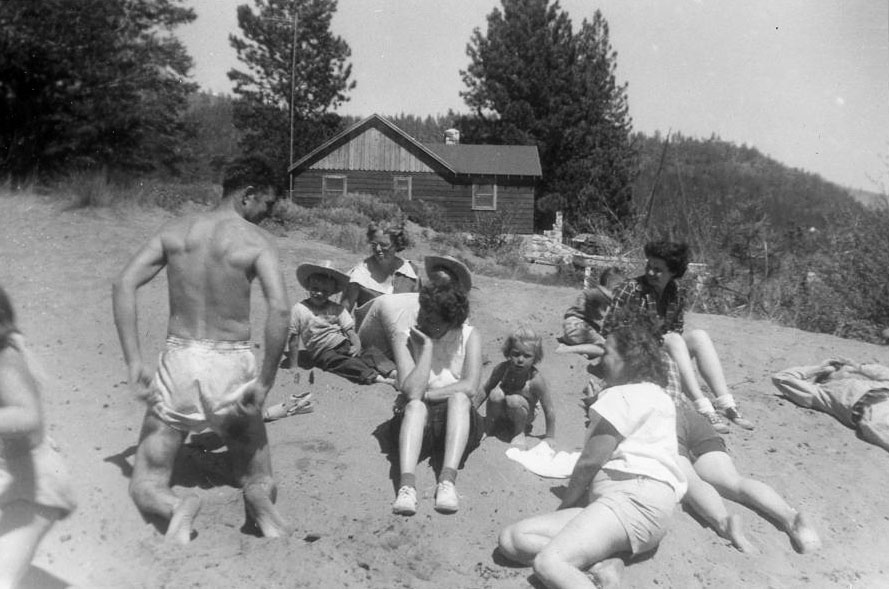
Kings Beach, Lake Tahoe, around 1945

Kings Beach is a census-designated place (CDP) in Placer County, California, United States, on the north shore of Lake Tahoe. The population was 3,563 at the 2020 census.

The town's post office was erected in 1937. The area is named after its first postmaster, Joe King.

== Geography ==
According to the United States Census Bureau, the CDP has a total area of 3.0 square miles (7.8 km^{2}), of which 2.9 square miles (7.5 km^{2}) is land and 0.12 square miles (0.31 km^{2}) is water.

Kings Beach sits on the north shore of Lake Tahoe. It sits on the Nevada state line and borders Crystal Bay, Nevada, to the east.

California State Route 28 begins where Nevada State Route 28 ends in Crystal Bay; Route 28 passes through Kings Beach along the Lake Tahoe shore. California State Route 267 meets Route 28 in Kings Beach and connects the town to Northstar, Truckee, and Interstate 80.

== Demographics ==
Historical population
Year	Pop.	±%
1980	1,942	—
1990	2,796	+44.0%
2000	4,037	+44.4%
2010	3,796	−6.0%
2020	3,563	−6.1%
U.S. Decennial Census

Because of its location on Lake Tahoe, Kings Beach is one of the top vacation spots in Northern California, and many of its dwellings are vacation homes. Fire officials attribute the community's "very high fire hazard severity zone" designation in part to visitors' desire to light campfires. An illegal campfire caused the nearby Angora Fire in 2007.

=== 2020 census ===
As of the 2020 census, Kings Beach had a population of 3,563. The population density was 1,047.9 inhabitants per square mile (404.6/km^{2}). The median age was 36.5 years. 23.9% of residents were under the age of 18 and 11.5% of residents were 65 years of age or older. For every 100 females there were 111.8 males, and for every 100 females age 18 and over there were 116.0 males age 18 and over.

95.0% of residents lived in urban areas, while 5.0% lived in rural areas.

There were 1,417 households in Kings Beach, of which 31.1% had children under the age of 18 living in them. Of all households, 37.0% were married-couple households, 30.3% were households with a male householder and no spouse or partner present, and 23.1% were households with a female householder and no spouse or partner present. About 31.8% of all households were made up of individuals and 9.4% had someone living alone who was 65 years of age or older.

There were 2,393 housing units, of which 40.8% were vacant. The homeowner vacancy rate was 1.7% and the rental vacancy rate was 3.1%.

Racial composition as of the 2020 census
Race	Number	Percent
White	1,899	53.3%
Black or African American	5	0.1%
American Indian and Alaska Native	27	0.8%
Asian	68	1.9%
Native Hawaiian and Other Pacific Islander	10	0.3%
Some other race	804	22.6%
Two or more races	750	21.0%
Hispanic or Latino (of any race)	1,699	47.7%

=== 2010 census ===
At the 2010 census Kings Beach had a population of 3,796. The population density was 1,103.7 inhabitants per square mile (426.1/km^{2}). The racial makeup of Kings Beach was 3,216 (84.7%) White, 15 (0.4%) African American, 20 (0.5%) Native American, 14 (0.4%) Asian, 2 (0.1%) Pacific Islander, 409 (10.8%) from other races, and 120 (3.2%) from two or more races. Hispanic or Latino of any race were 2,115 persons (55.7%).

The census reported that 3,717 people (97.9% of the population) lived in households, 79 (2.1%) lived in non-institutionalized group quarters, and no one was institutionalized.

There were 1,362 households, 487 (35.8%) had children under the age of 18 living in them, 589 (43.2%) were opposite-sex married couples living together, 106 (7.8%) had a female householder with no husband present, 81 (5.9%) had a male householder with no wife present. There were 134 (9.8%) unmarried opposite-sex partnerships, and 6 (0.4%) same-sex married couples or partnerships. 381 households (28.0%) were one person and 72 (5.3%) had someone living alone who was 65 or older. The average household size was 2.73. There were 776 families (57.0% of households); the average family size was 3.44.

The age distribution was 924 people (24.3%) under the age of 18, 400 people (10.5%) aged 18 to 24, 1,405 people (37.0%) aged 25 to 44, 842 people (22.2%) aged 45 to 64, and 225 people (5.9%) who were 65 or older. The median age was 31.6 years. For every 100 females, there were 125.3 males. For every 100 females age 18 and over, there were 129.8 males.

There were 2,372 housing units at an average density of 689.7 per square mile, of the occupied units 552 (40.5%) were owner-occupied and 810 (59.5%) were rented. The homeowner vacancy rate was 5.3%; the rental vacancy rate was 14.4%. 1,379 people (36.3% of the population) lived in owner-occupied housing units and 2,338 people (61.6%) lived in rental housing units.

=== 2000 census ===
At the 2000 census, there were 4,037 people, 1,411 households, and 788 families in the CDP. The population density was 1,176.4 inhabitants per square mile (454.2/km^{2}). There were 2,284 housing units at an average density of 665.6 units per square mile (257.0 units/km^{2}). The racial makeup of the CDP was 70.03% White, 0.72% Black or African American, 1.88% Native American, 0.40% Asian, 0.02% Pacific Islander, 23.61% from other races, and 3.34% from two or more races. 48.43% of the population were Hispanic or Latino of any race.

Of the 1,411 households 34.8% had children under the age of 18 living with them, 39.4% were married couples living together, 8.9% had a female householder with no husband present, and 44.1% were non-families. 28.3% of households were one person and 3.0% were one person aged 65 or older. The average household size was 2.86 and the average family size was 3.69.

The age distribution was 28.0% under the age of 18, 13.3% from 18 to 24, 38.0% from 25 to 44, 17.4% from 45 to 64, and 3.4% 65 or older. The median age was 29 years. For every 100 females, there were 122.9 males. For every 100 females aged 18 and over, there were 133.2 males.

The median household income was $35,507 and the median family income was $37,837. Males had a median income of $25,880 versus $21,571 for females. The per capita income for the CDP was $16,556. About 17.1% of families and 17.7% of the population were below the poverty line, including 20.3% of those under age 18 and 4.1% of those age 65 or over.

== Historic fire lookout and scenic overlook ==
The historic Stateline fire lookout and Crystal Bay scenic overlook are in Kings Beach on the hill above downtown, close to the California–Nevada state line, accessible by an easy hiking trail from Crystal Bay, Nevada.

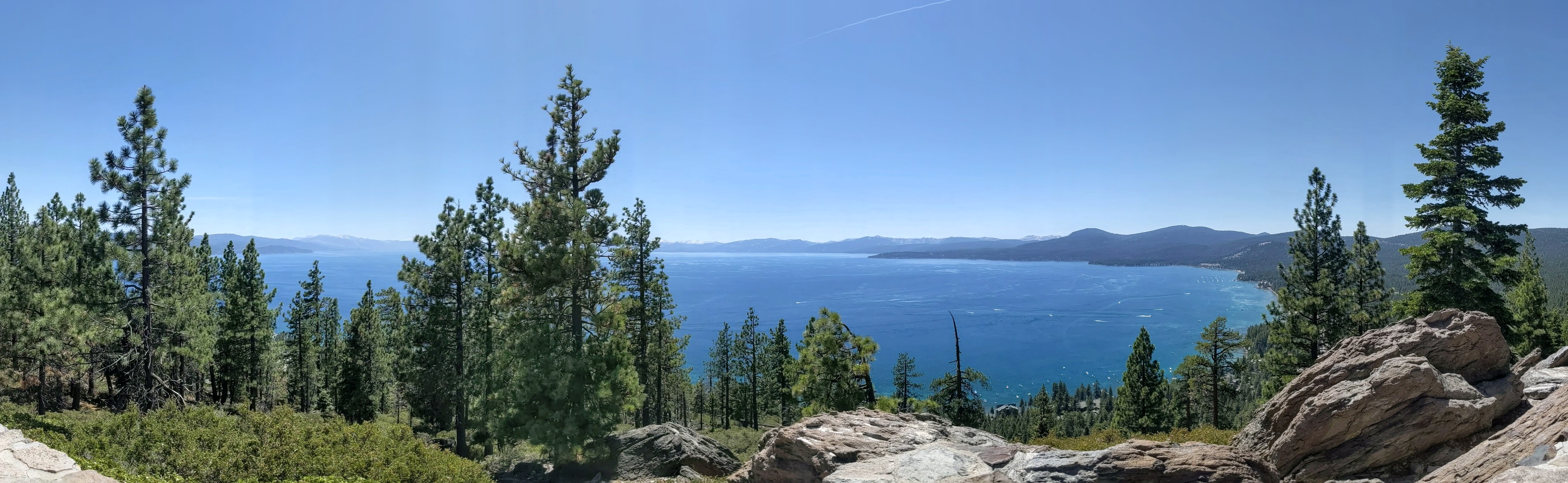
Panoramic view of Lake Tahoe from historic Stateline fire lookout

== Education ==
It is in the Tahoe-Truckee Unified School District.

== Beaver controversy ==
In November, 2009, historically endemic California Golden beavers were caught in snares underwater and exterminated in Griff Creek, a stream in Kings Beach, when the Placer County Department of Public Works ordered their removal for fear that the beaver would cause flooding. Although beavers are an invasive species to the area, recent studies of two other Lake Tahoe tributaries, Taylor Creek and Ward Creek, showed that beaver dam removal decreased wetland habitat, increased stream flow, and increased total phosphorus pollutants entering Lake Tahoe – all factors that negatively impact the clarity of the lake's water (United States Geological Survey 2002). Beavers develop wetland areas which trap sediments and improve water quality. Flow devices such as "Beaver Deceivers" are often used to control water heights in beaver ponds instead of killing beavers, as the latter is typically only a temporary remedy, for beavers recolonize prime habitat quickly. In fact, in October 2010 Placer County officials again exterminated beavers at King's Beach only to have schoolchildren protest and suggest more contemporary management solutions. According to Placer County officials there were four beavers who built three dams on Griff Creek, and they were killed by sharpshooters licensed by the county in a night operation. The Tahoe Regional Planning Agency stated that "removing beavers is not uncommon at Lake Tahoe" but "the county could have 'easily' removed the beaver dam in a more conscientious manner, thus preventing sediment naturally filtered by the dam from reaching Lake Tahoe." Cheryl Millham, executive director of Lake Tahoe Wildlife Care, argued that the culverts on Griff Creek could easily be protected from damming with fencing and that "municipalities all over the United States have learned to peacefully co-exist with these animals." Depredation is likely a temporary solution as the county has had to kill beaver families two years in a row and Peter Kraatz, deputy director of the Placer County Department of Public Works, conceded that the area is "perfect habitat for beavers".

== See also ==
- Angora Fire
- Beaver in the Sierra Nevada
- Griff Creek
