= Ward Creek (Rogue River tributary) =

Stream in Oregon, U.S.

Coordinates: 42°25′45″N 123°10′16″W

Ward Creek is a stream in the U.S. state of Oregon. It is a tributary to the Rogue River.

Ward Creek was named after Oliver J. Ward.
