= Trout Creek (Lake Tahoe) =

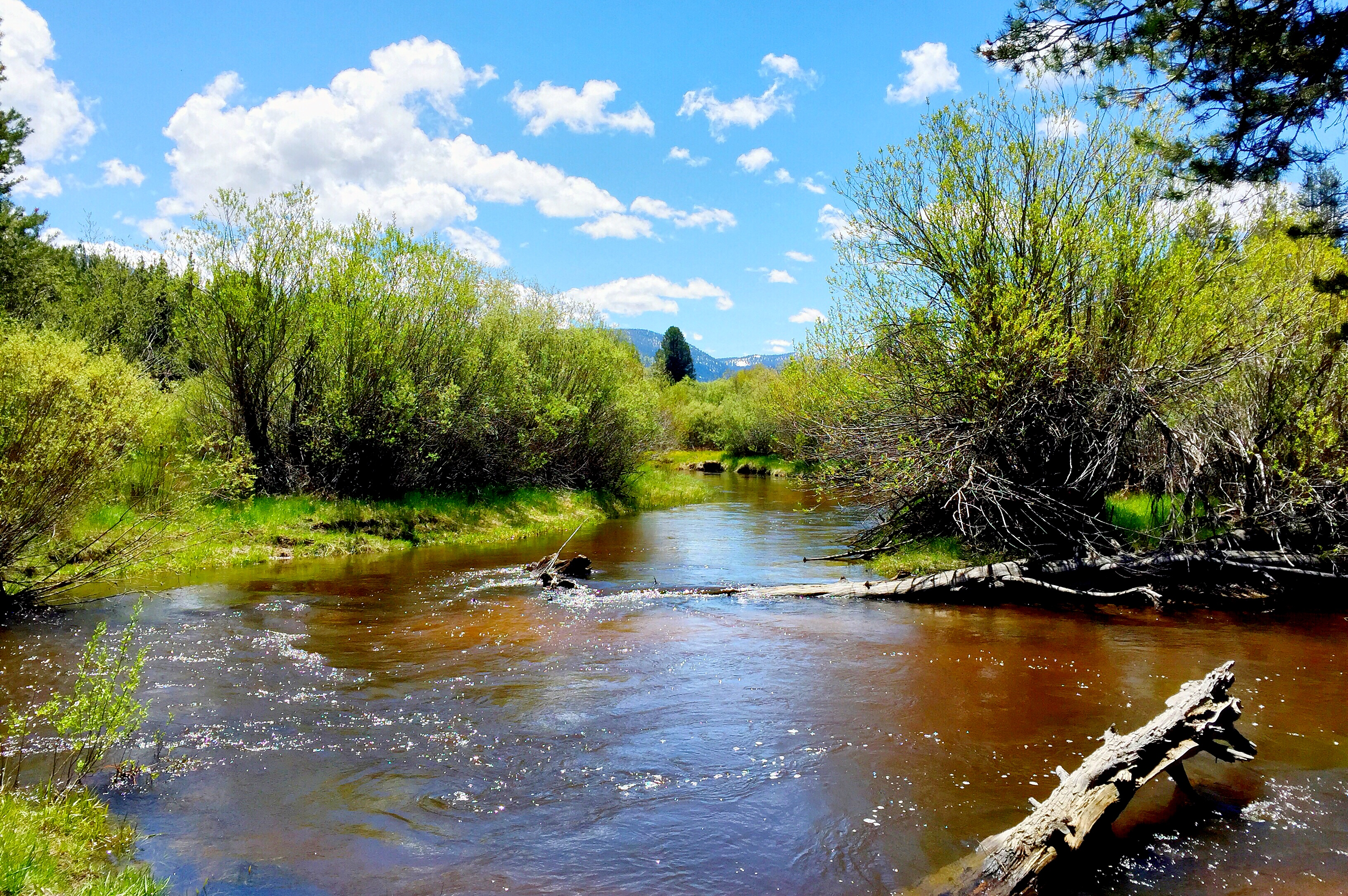
- Native name: Mathocahuw O'tha (Washo)

Location
- Country: United States
- State: California
- Region: El Dorado County

Physical characteristics
- Source: West side of Armstrong Pass in the Carson Range of the Sierra Nevada
  - coordinates: 38°50′01″N 119°54′49″W
  - elevation: 8,630 ft (2,630 m)
- Mouth: Lake Tahoe
  - location: South Lake Tahoe, California
  - coordinates: 38°56′28″N 119°59′48″W
  - elevation: 6,224 ft (1,897 m)

Basin features
- Tributaries
  - left: Saxon Creek
  - right: Cold Creek, Heavenly Valley Creek

Trout Creek is a northward-flowing stream originating on the west side of Armstrong Pass on the Carson Range in El Dorado County, California, United States.

== History ==
Trout Creek was an important fall camp for the Washo people who caught Mountain whitefish (Prosopium williamsoni, formerly Coregonus williamsoni (Girard, 1856)) there. The Washo name Mathocahuw O'tha means "river of the whitefish". George and Adeline Fountain built a log cabin near the headwaters in 1860 and the area is referred to as "Fountain Place".

== Watershed ==
Trout Creek originates south of Freel Peak in the Carson Range of the Sierra Nevada. It is joined by Saxon Creek in Lake Valley, then meets Cold Creek at Lake Christopher which was created by damming the creek, then after being joined by Heavenly Valley Creek, it enters Truckee Marsh and south Lake Tahoe. The only lake in the Trout Creek watershed is Star Lake. Trout Creek has a drainage area of 106 square kilometers, and the main channel length is approximately 19.5 km long. The Cold Creek sub-basin drains a watershed area of 12.8 square miles (33 km^{2}) and originates at 10,884 feet (3,317 m) at Freel Peak.

== Ecology ==
The Trout Creek Stream Restoration and Wildlife Enhancement Project in South Lake Tahoe was completed in 2001. Over 3000 m of channel were reconstructed with enhanced sinuosity, a raised channel elevation, reduced slope, and an overall increase in channel length. The purpose was to improve stream habitat, raise the water table and to allow for increased hydrologic connectivity between the stream channel and the floodplain. Trout Creek is being studied by the U. S. Forest Service for the effectiveness of the stream restoration effectiveness, particularly total and fine sediment load reductions with a final report due in 2012.

North American beaver (Castor canadensis) inhabit multiple reaches of Trout Creek and Cold Creek. Beaver were re-introduced to the Tahoe Basin by the CDFG and the U. S. Forest Service between 1934 and 1949 in order to prevent stream degradation and to promote wetland restoration. The presence of beaver dams has also been shown to either increase the number of fish, their size, or both, in a study of brook, rainbow and brown trout in Sagehen Creek, which flows into the Little Truckee River at an altitude of 5,800 feet (1,800 m) and is a stream typical of the eastern slope of the northern Sierra Nevada. Not only have aspen and cottonwood survived ongoing beaver colonization but a recent study of ten Tahoe streams, including Trout Creek and Cold Creek, utilizing aerial multispectral videography has shown that deciduous, thick herbaceous, and thin herbaceous vegetation are more highly concentrated near beaver dams, whereas coniferous trees are decreased. Benefits of beaver dams include removal of sediment and excessive pollutants travelling downstream, which improves lake clarity, which was shown to worsen recently when beaver dams were removed in nearby Taylor Creek and Ward Creek.

== See also ==
- Beaver in the Sierra Nevada
