= Burton Creek State Park =

State park in California, United States

- Location within California Location within the United States
- Location: Placer County, California, United States
- Nearest city: Tahoe City, California
- Coordinates: 39°11′42″N 120°8′30″W
- Area: 1,890 acres (7.6 km^{2})
- Established: 1976
- Governing body: California Department of Parks and Recreation

Burton Creek State Park is a state park in the U.S. state of California, located in Placer County near Truckee. Situated on the outskirts of Tahoe City, the park offers 6 miles (9.7 km) of unpaved roadway for hiking and cross-country skiing. The 1,890-acre (760 ha) park was established in 1976.

== See also ==
- List of California state parks
