= Upper Truckee River =

Upper Truckee River Lake Stream, Lake Valley Creek, Little Truckee River
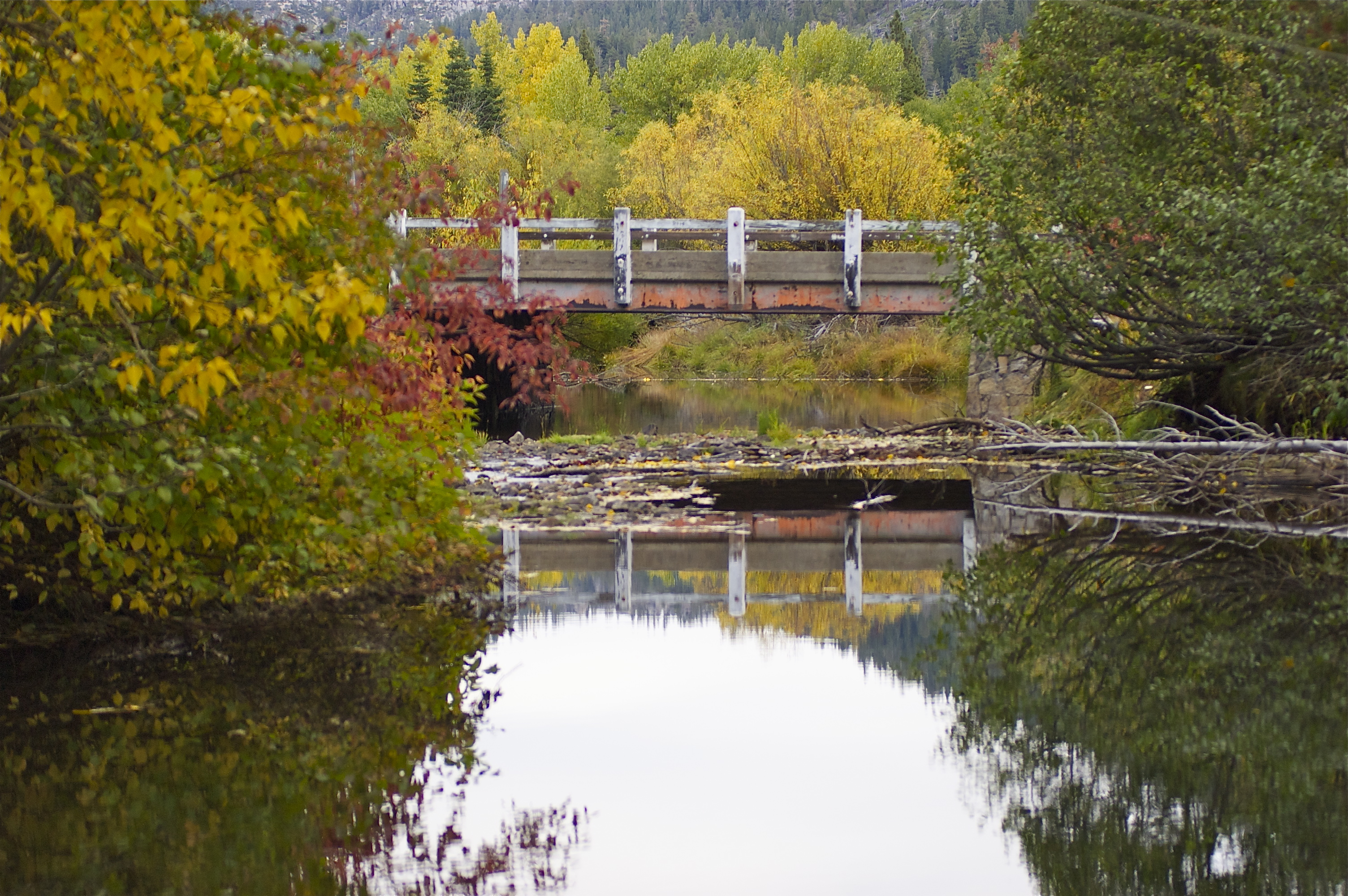
- Upper Truckee River, October 2010
- Etymology: Named after the Paiute chief Truckee

Location
- Country: United States
- State: California
- Cities: Meyers, California, South Lake Tahoe, California

Physical characteristics
- Source: Red Lake Peak
  - location: Sierra Nevada, Alpine County, California
  - coordinates: 38°43′06″N 119°59′21″W
  - elevation: 9,480 ft (2,890 m)
- Mouth: Lake Tahoe
  - location: El Dorado County, California
  - coordinates: 38°56′32″N 119°59′46″W
  - elevation: 6,224 ft (1,897 m)

Basin features
- Tributaries
  - left: Echo Creek, Angora Creek
  - right: Grass Lake Creek, Trout Creek (Lake Tahoe) (historically)

The Upper Truckee River is a stream that flows northward from the western slope of Red Lake Peak in Alpine County, California to Lake Tahoe via the Truckee Marsh in South Lake Tahoe, California. The river flows northeasterly and is 23 miles (37 km) long. It is Lake Tahoe's largest tributary.

== History ==
At the very top of the Upper Truckee River watershed, Grass Lake and Grass Lake Creek were named by civil engineer and land surveyor George H. Goddard, who in 1859 crossed Luther Pass from Hope Valley in the West Fork Carson River watershed over the pass and found "a swampy valley...with a pond filled with rank grass that (we) called Grass Lake...".

== Watershed ==
This watershed is the largest in the Lake Tahoe Basin and occupies 56.5 square miles (146 km^{2}), which is 18 percent of the total land area tributary to Lake Tahoe (314 square miles (810 km^{2})). Tributaries include Angora, Echo, Grass Lake, and Big Meadow Creeks, and Upper and Lower Echo, Round, and Dardanelles Lakes. Major lakes include and smaller lakes include Dardanelles, Round, Showers, Elbert, Tamarack, Ralston, and Angora Lakes.

The stretch between Meyers and South Lake Tahoe is known as Lake Valley.

Historically, Trout Creek was a tributary to the Upper Truckee River in the Truckee Marsh area near the lake (fig. 2). But with the development of the Tahoe Keys, the Upper Truckee River was channeled to the lake, and currently the streamflow of the two tributaries combine only during high runoff.

== Ecology and restoration ==
Woody vegetation in the Upper Truckee River watershed is primarily coniferous forest with lodgepole pine, ponderosa pine, Jeffrey pine, white fir, red fir, western white pine, mountain hemlock, and sugar pine. Alders, aspens, and willows are common along the stream zone. Major wetlands include Grass Lake, Osgood Swamp, Truckee Marsh, Benwood Meadow, and Big Meadow. Two large sphagnum bogs, Grass Lake and Osgood Swamp, are located in the watershed, and both are considered to be Significant Natural Areas by the California Department of Fish and Game (CDFG). Grass Lake has been designated a U.S. Forest Service Research Natural Area. The headwaters are in Desolation Wilderness and in roadless areas managed for quasi-wilderness uses by the U.S. Forest Service. Both areas receive heavy recreational use. The reach of the Upper Truckee above Christmas Valley is under study for inclusion in the federal Wild and Scenic Rivers system. Threatened native Lahontan cutthroat trout (Oncorhynchus clarki henshawi) have been reintroduced into the river in the Meiss Meadows area, and the endangered shorezone plant Lake Tahoe yellowcress (Rorippa subumbellata) is found near the mouth of the river on the shores of Lake Tahoe.

Much of the vast Truckee Marsh was filled to create the Tahoe Keys subdivision. Further hydrologic modification occurred (reaches of the river were channelized) for construction of the South Lake Tahoe airport. Spills of treated wastewater from the South Tahoe Public Utility District's export facilities in this watershed are an ongoing concern.

The straight boulder-lined man-made channel by the airport was converted back to a more natural, meandering course as of November, 2011.

California State Parks acquired two properties to protect wet meadows and floodplain habitat along the Upper Truckee River in the mid-1980s: Washoe Meadows State Park (WMSP) and Lake Valley State Recreation Area (LVSRA).

== See also ==
- Truckee River
- Trout Creek
- Dardanelles and Freel Roadless Areas
