= Blackwood Creek (California) =

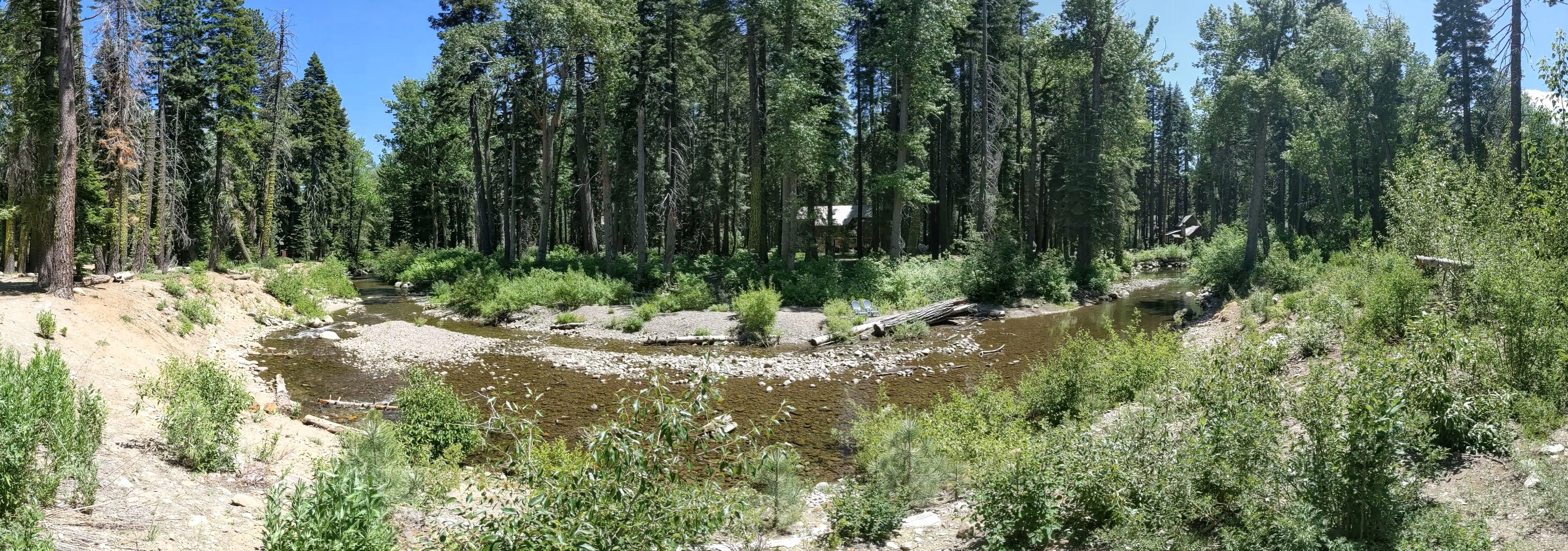
- Blackwood Creek, just above California State Route 89

- Location of the mouth of Blackwood Creek in California

Location
- Country: United States
- State: California
- Region: Placer County
- Cities: Tahoe Pines, Idlewild

Physical characteristics
- Source: Southwest flank of Ellis Peak in the Sierra Nevada Mountains
  - coordinates: 37°19′12″N 122°09′19″W
  - elevation: 8,000 ft (2,400 m)
- Mouth: Lake Tahoe
  - location: Tahoe Pines
  - coordinates: 39°03′47″N 120°12′24″W
  - elevation: 6,234 ft (1,900 m)

Basin features
- Tributaries
  - left: Middle Fork Blackwood Creek, North Fork Blackwood Creek

Blackwood Creek (Washo: dogásliʔ), is a 8-mile-long (13 km) eastward-flowing stream originating on the southwest flank of Ellis Peak in the Sierra Nevada. The creek flows into Lake Tahoe 4.2 miles (6.8 km) south of Tahoe City, California, between the unincorporated communities of Idlewild and Tahoe Pines in Placer County, California, United States.

== History ==
Blackwood Creek was named for early settler, miner and fisherman Hampton Craig Blackwood, who settled at the creek's mouth in 1866. The area was heavily grazed and logged into the 1970s. "Blackwood Pass" at the head of the creek is named on the Wheeler Survey Report of 1876–1877.

== Watershed ==
Blackwood Creek is the third largest stream (by area and discharge) of the 63 Tahoe Basin watersheds flowing into Lake Tahoe. The Blackwood Creek watershed drains an area of 7,166 acres (2,900 ha) and the creek mainstem has Middle Fork and North Fork tributaries. The creek mainstem is paralleled by Barker Pass Road.

== Ecology ==
Historically, Blackwood Creek once hosted native Lahontan cutthroat trout (Oncorhynchus clarki henshawi) and other native fishes and was almost as important as the Upper Truckee River to the Washoe as a fishery. It is now a critical spawning stream for Lake Tahoe's non-native rainbow trout (Oncorhynchus mykiss).

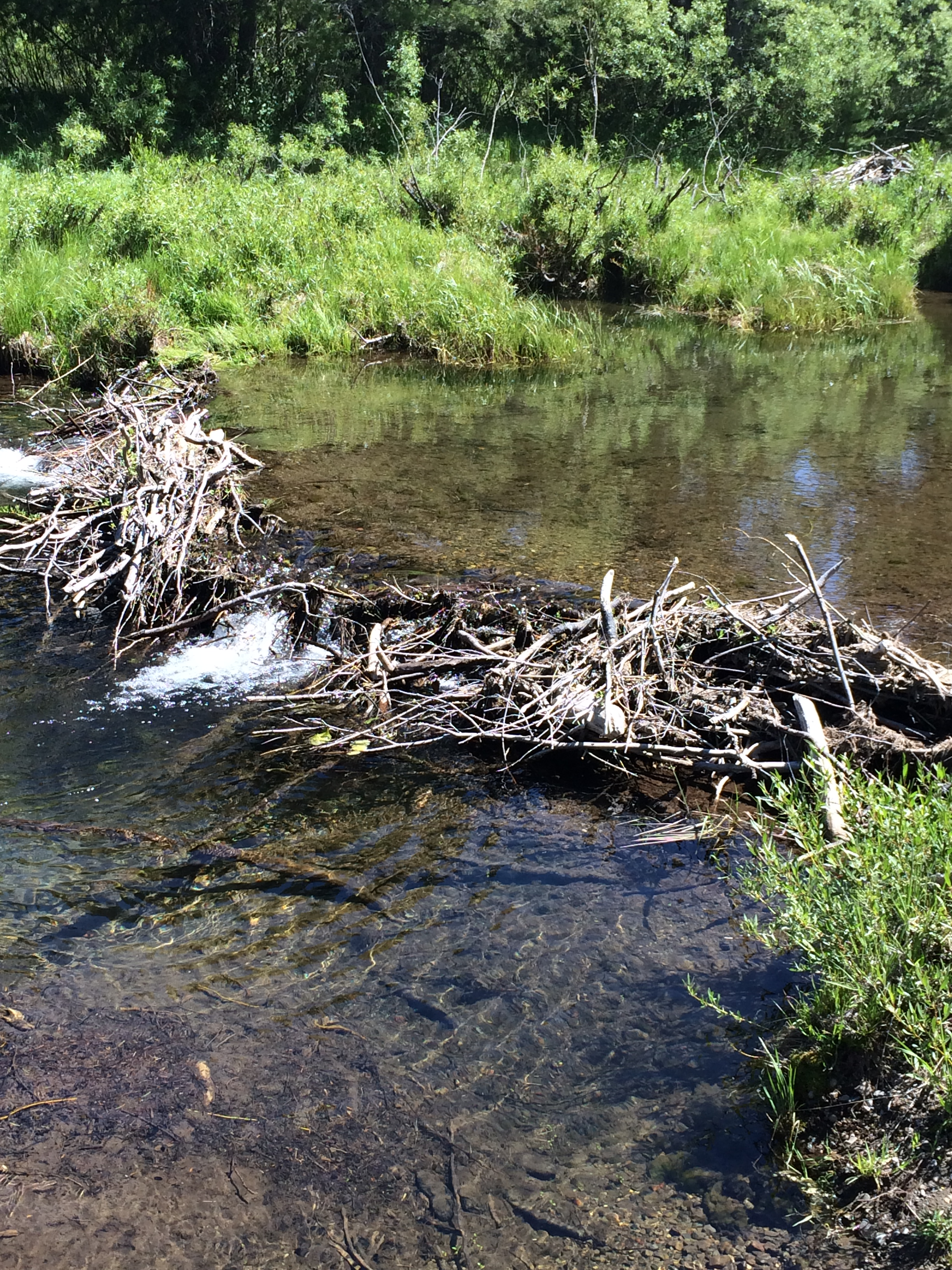
Beaver dam on Blackwood Creek apparently broken by vandals. Beaver dams are easily crossed by trout and beaver ponds serve as critical breaks for wildfires.

== See also ==
- List of Lake Tahoe inflow streams
