= Idlewild, Placer County, California =

Unincorporated community in California, United States

Idlewild
- Unincorporated community
- Location in California Idlewild (the United States)
- Coordinates: 39°06′32″N 120°09′34″W
- Country: United States
- State: California
- County: Placer County
- Elevation: 6,200 ft (1,900 m)

Idlewild is an unincorporated community in Placer County, California. Idlewild is located on Lake Tahoe, 1.5 miles (2.4 km) north of Homewood. It lies at an elevation of 6234 feet (1900 m).

Idlewild was the name of a summer lodge built at the location in 1905 by Frederick Kohl of San Francisco. Kohl also acquired a large cruiser ship, also named the Idlewild, which sailed on Lake Tahoe for many years. The ship was hauled ashore in 1942, and then destroyed in December of that year when it was crushed by a tree blown over in a storm.
