= Diamond Peak (ski area) =

Ski area in Nevada, United States

Diamond Peak Ski Resort
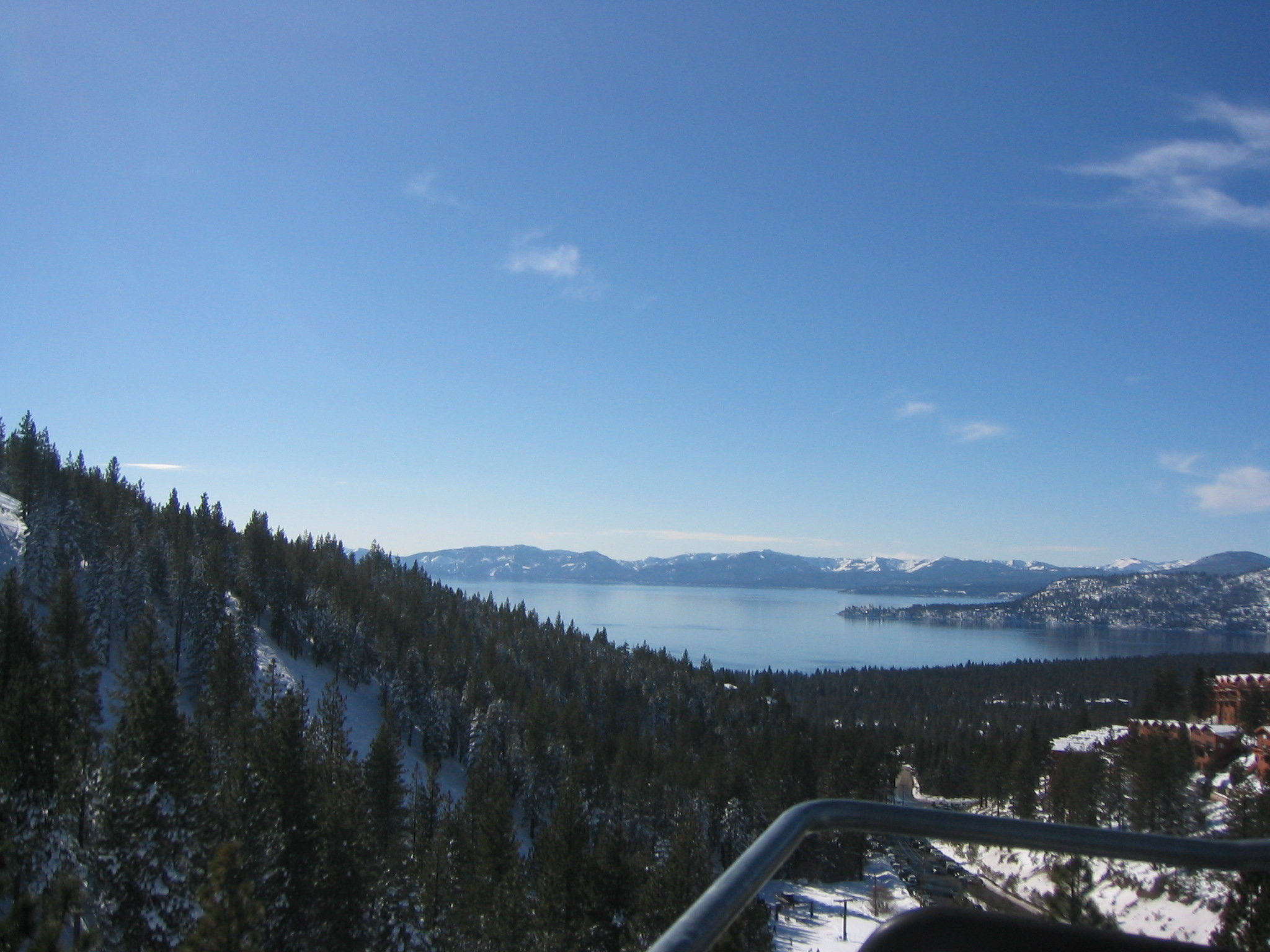
- View of Lake Tahoe from Lakeview quad lift

- Location in Nevada Diamond Peak Ski Resort (the United States)
- Location: Incline Village, Nevada, U.S.
- Nearest city: Reno – 23 miles (37 km)
- Coordinates: 39.254°N 119.924°W
- Vertical: 1,840 ft (561 m)
- Top elevation: 8,540 ft (2,603 m) AMSL
- Base elevation: 6,700 ft (2,042 m)
- Skiable area: 655 acres (2.65 km^{2})
- Trails: 30 – 18% easiest – 46% more difficult – 36% most difficult
- Longest run: 2.5 miles (4.0 km)
- Lift system: 6 chairlifts; 1 surface lift
- Lift capacity: Crystal Express – 4; Lakeview Quad – 4; Lodgepole Quad – 4; Red Fox – 2; Ridge Chair – 2; Schoolhouse – 2
- Terrain parks: 3
- Snowmaking: 75%
- Night skiing: none
- Website: www.diamondpeak.com

Diamond Peak is a ski resort in the Western United States, located in Incline Village, Nevada. Near the northeast shore of Lake Tahoe, the resort has 6 chairlifts, 27 runs, and 14 open glades/tree skiing on its 655 acres (2.65 km^{2}) of terrain.

Its summit elevation is 8,540 feet (2,603 m) above sea level, yielding a vertical drop of 1,840 feet (561 m), sixth among the ski areas surrounding Lake Tahoe. Its season ranges from December to April, and its longest run is 2.5 miles (4.0 km). Lifts include the "Lakeview Quad" which features a view of Lake Tahoe during the lift's ascent.

== Lifts ==
Diamond Peak has six chairlifts and one surface lift (only used by the ski/snowboard school):

Chairlifts:

- Lakeview Quad (launchpad)
- School House
- Red Fox
- Ridge
- Lodgepole Quad (launchpad)
- Crystal Express

Surface Lift:

- Pete's Powerline (only for ski/snowboard school)

== History ==
Oklahoman entrepreneur Art Wood and his associate Harold Tiller envisioned the idea for the resort which was then known as "Ski Incline", and was developed to reality in 1966 by Luggi Foeger, an Austrian ski resort consultant whom Wood hired to design and build the resort. It has long since expanded and grown since its debut 60 years ago in November 1966.

== See also ==
- Skiing
- List of ski areas and resorts in the United States
