= Meeks Bay, California =

Unincorporated community in California, United States

Meeks Bay
- Unincorporated community
- Location in California Meeks Bay (the United States)
- Coordinates: 39°02′04″N 120°07′27″W
- Country: United States
- State: California
- County: El Dorado
- Elevation: 6,240 ft (1,902 m)

Meeks Bay (formerly Meigs Bay, Micks Bay, and Murphys) is an unincorporated community in El Dorado County, California, United States. It lies on Lake Tahoe at the mouth of Meeks Creek, at an elevation of 6240 feet (1902 m). The place is named for John Meeks, who owned the land.

Meeks Bay was once the site of a popular summer resort, with a 400-seat theater, several restaurants, beauty shops, and horse stables. The resort closed in the 1970s, and a US Forest Service campground was built on the site. The Washoe tribe later acquired meadow land along Lake Tahoe and gained the right to operate a newer resort complex at Meek's Bay, re-establishing some of the tribe's original presence along the shores of Lake Tahoe.

A post office operated at Meeks Bay from 1929 to 1972.

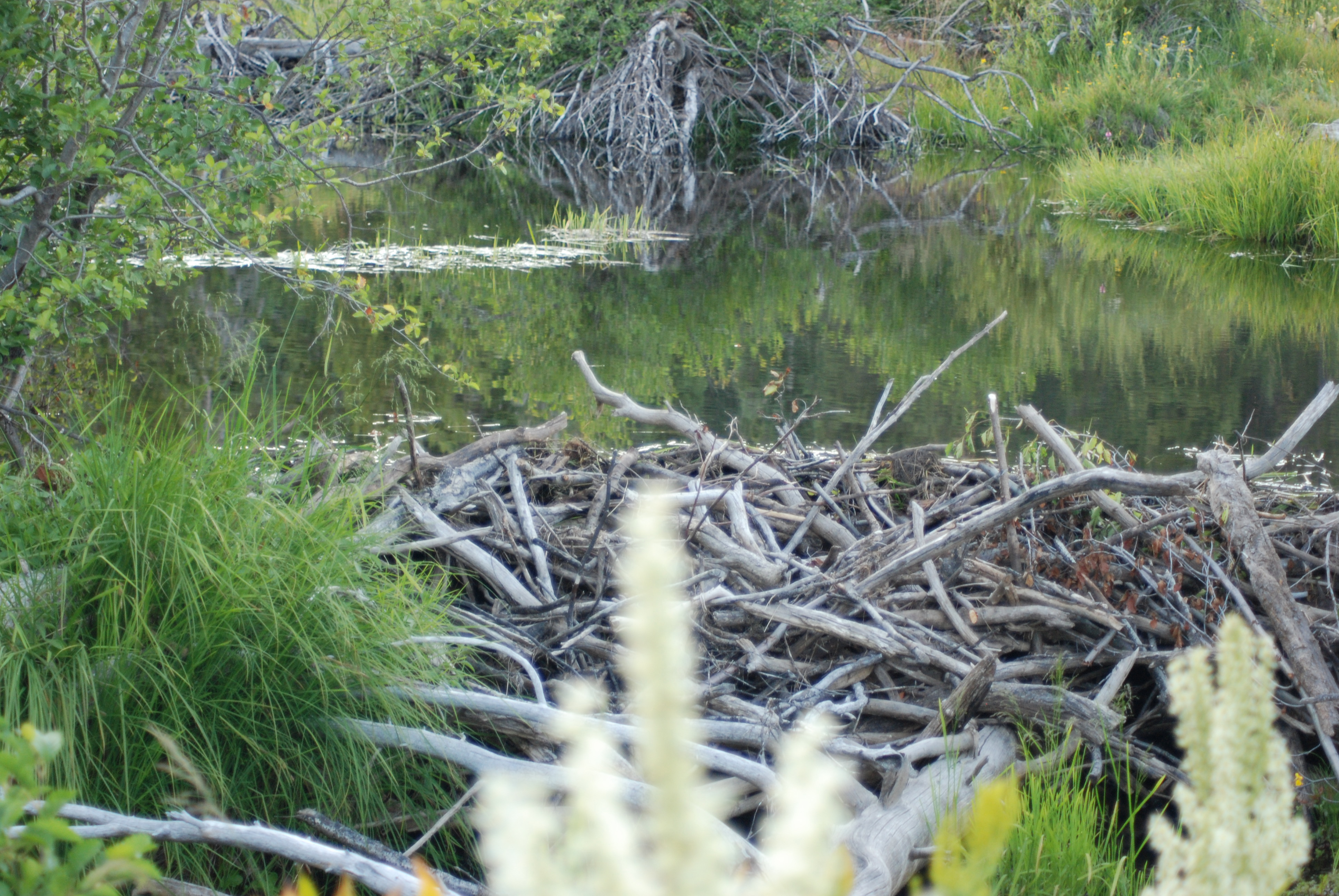
A beaver dam on Meeks Creek, Lake Tahoe, August 2010
