= Meeks Creek =

Meeks Creek Meigs Creek
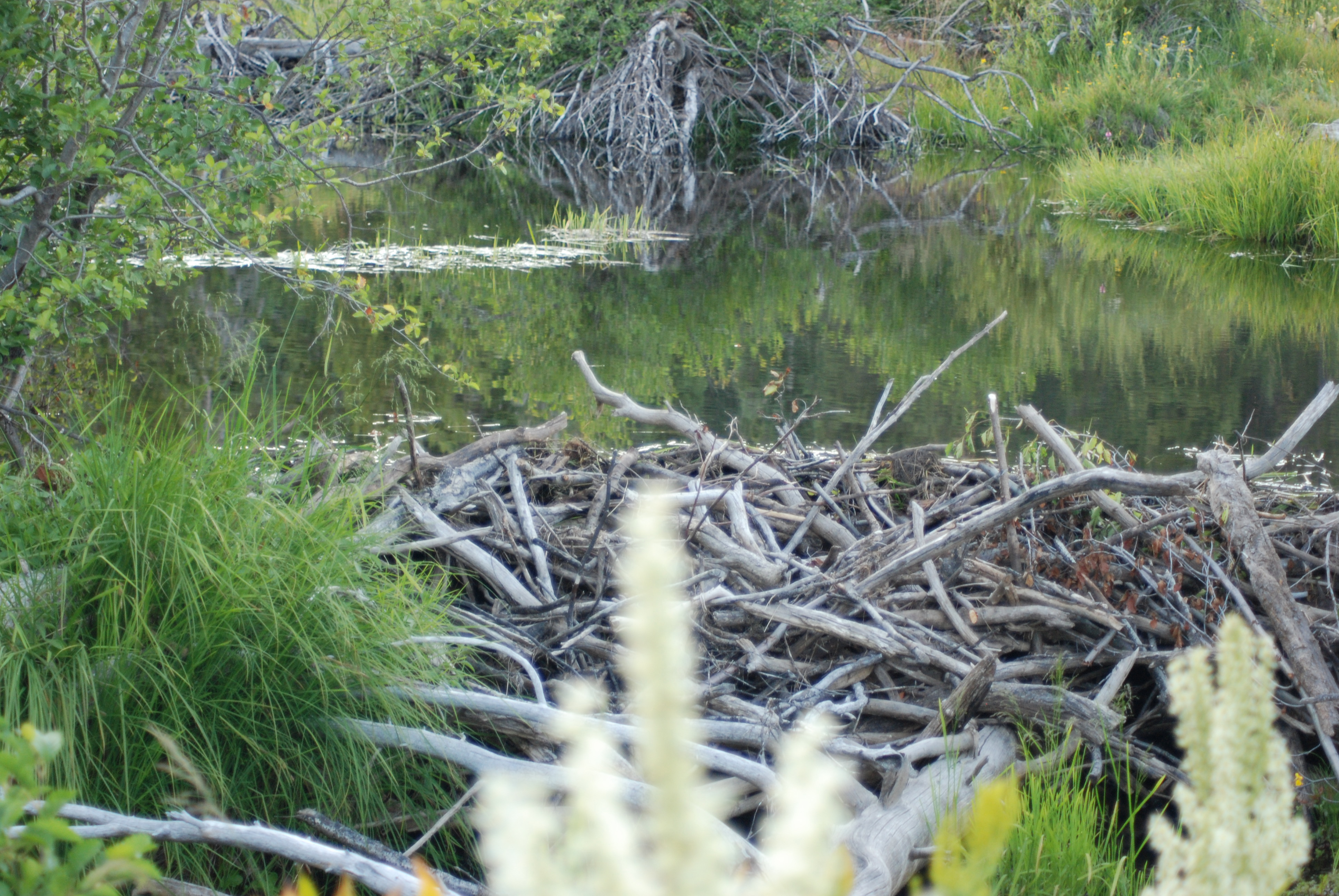
- A beaver dam in Meeks Meadow with White-flowered bog orchid (Platanthera leucostachys) in foreground, 2010

Location
- Country: United States
- State: California
- Region: El Dorado County
- City: Meeks Bay, California

Physical characteristics
- Source: Rubicon Lake
  - location: Desolation Wilderness
  - coordinates: 38°58′05″N 120°08′03″W
  - elevation: 2,400 ft (730 m)
- Mouth: Lake Tahoe
  - location: Meeks Bay, California
  - coordinates: 39°02′13″N 120°07′22″W
  - elevation: 6,234 ft (1,900 m)

Meeks Creek is a western tributary of Lake Tahoe which has its source on Rubicon Lake, 1.2 miles (1.9 km) northeast of Phipps Peak in Desolation Wilderness, trends northwest through Stony Ridge Lake, Shadow Lake, Crag Lake, and Lake Genevieve 3.5 miles (5.6 km), continues northeast 3.5 miles (5.6 km) to Meeks Bay on Lake Tahoe. At its mouth is the tiny town of Meeks Bay, in El Dorado County, California, United States.

== History ==
The stream and bay are named for John Meeks, who owned the land. The Meeks brothers bailed 25 tons of wild hay in the meadows at the mouth of Meeks Creek in 1862.

== Ecology ==
North American beaver (Castor canadensis) are gradually restoring Meeks Meadow which had been overgrown with coniferous trees. This meadow is an important wildflower viewing area and is easy to access as the trail starts across from Meeks Bay Resort. Mallow, iris, meadow aster, buckwheat, wandering daisy, yarrow, yampah, phlox, scarlet gilia, monkshood, flax and lupine are just some of the flowers that one can see in bloom during the peak flowering time in late June–July.

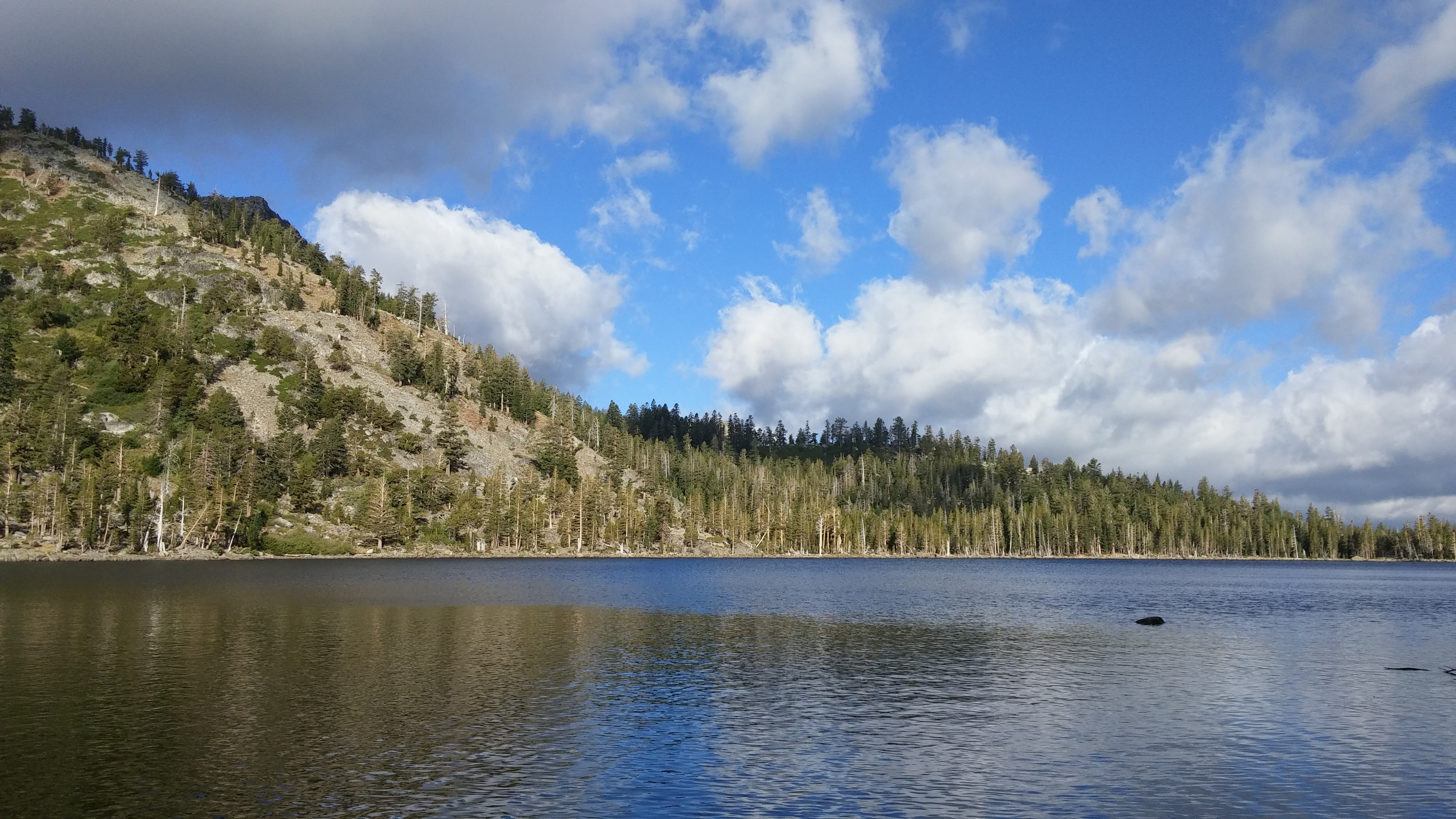
Stony Ridge Lake, fed by Meeks Creek.

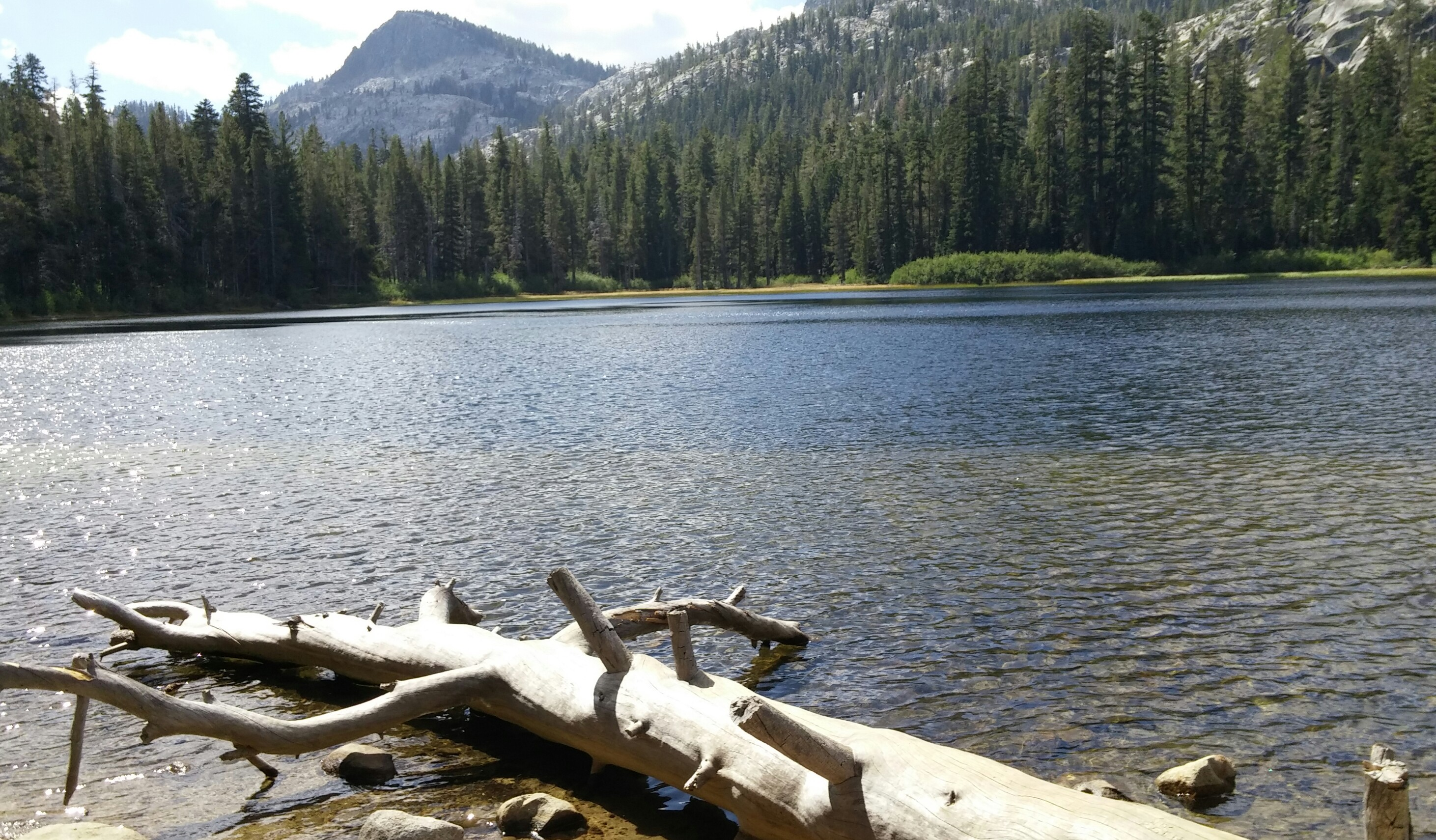
Lake Genevieve, fed by Meeks Creek

== Recreation ==
The Meeks Bay trail follows Meeks Creek, beginning just north of the California State Route 89 bridge over the stream. The first 1.4 miles is along a gentle gated road and parallels Meeks meadow, which after an additional mile meets a trail that courses southwest eventually meeting the Pacific Crest Trail between Phipps Peak and Middle Velma Lake. The total trail length to Rubicon Lake is 8 miles (13.33 km); to Stony Ridge Lake 6.3 miles; to Shadow Lake 5.9 miles; to Hidden Lake 5.7 miles; to Crag Lake 5 miles; to Genevieve Lake 4.5 miles. Crag Lake is a popular day trip goal and swimming lake.

The lower 1.8 miles of trail are also excellent for snowshoeing (3.6 miles round trip and 1,000 feet elevation gain).
