= Hot Springs, California =

Hot Springs, California may refer to:

- Hot Springs, former name of Brockway, California

== See also ==
- Boyes Hot Springs, California
- Desert Hot Springs, California
- Fetters Hot Springs-Agua Caliente, California
- Harbin Hot Springs, California
