= California State Route 28 =

Highway in California

State Route 28
- SR 28 highlighted in red

Route information
- Maintained by Caltrans
- Length: 10.943 mi (17.611 km)

Major junctions
- West end: SR 89 in Tahoe City
- SR 267 at Kings Beach
- East end: SR 28 in Brockway

Location
- Country: United States
- State: California
- Counties: Placer

Highway system
- State highways in California; Interstate; US; State; Scenic; History; Pre‑1964; Unconstructed; Deleted; Freeways
← SR 27	→ SR 29

State Route 28 (SR 28) is a state highway in the U.S. state of California that travels along the northern shore of Lake Tahoe, starting at Route 89 in Tahoe City and ending at the Nevada state border, whereupon it becomes Nevada State Route 28.

== Route description ==
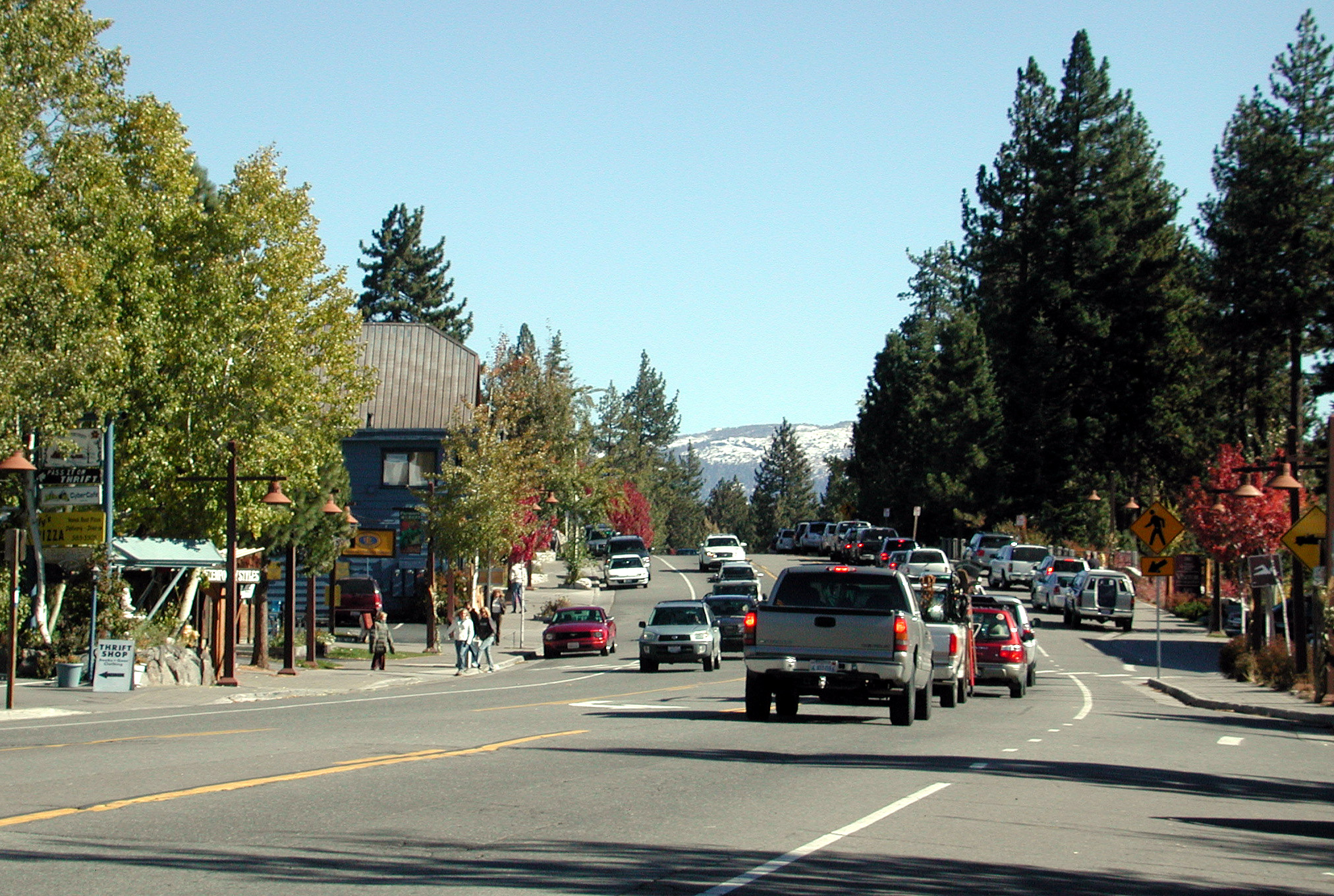
SR 28 in Tahoe City

Route 28 is defined in section 328 of the California Streets and Highways Code, and that the highway is "from Route 89 at Tahoe City along the northern boundary of Lake Tahoe to the Nevada state line at Crystal Bay".

The route begins at SR 89 in Tahoe City and heads eastward. It then intersects SR 267 in Kings Beach and continues to its terminus at Nevada State Route 28 at the Nevada state line. Route 28 is one of only three state routes that keep the same number in Nevada, along with Route 88 and Route 266.

SR 28 is part of the California Freeway and Expressway System, but is not part of the National Highway System, a network of highways that are considered essential to the country's economy, defense, and mobility by the Federal Highway Administration. SR 28 is eligible for the State Scenic Highway System, but it is not officially designated as a scenic highway by the California Department of Transportation.

== History ==
The original SR 28 highway, connecting the Mendocino coast to the Sacramento Valley, was renumbered SR 128 in 1952, allowing the present-day SR 28 to coordinate its numbering with Nevada State Route 28.

In October 2019, construction on a short bypass of SR 89 in Tahoe City, which includes two roundabouts and a new bridge over the Truckee River, was completed. As a result, SR 28 was extended for a short distance on part of SR 89's former alignment from its former western terminus at the "Wye" intersection that was formerly with SR 89 to its new western terminus at the roundabout with SR 89, adjacent to the Truckee River.

== Major intersections ==
Except where prefixed with a letter, postmiles were measured on the road as it was in 1964, based on the alignment that existed at the time, and do not necessarily reflect current mileage. Postmile prefixes include: R reflecting a realignment in the route since then, M indicating a second realignment, L referring to an overlap due to a correction or change, and T indicating postmiles classified as temporary. Segments that remain unconstructed or have been relinquished to local control may be omitted. The entire route is in Placer County.

Location	Postmile	Destinations	Notes
Tahoe City		SR 89 (River Road) – Truckee, Emerald Bay	Roundabout; west end of SR 28; serves Tahoe Forest Hospital
Tahoe City	0.09	Lake Boulevard to SR 89 south – Emerald Bay	Former SR 89 south
Kings Beach	9.34	SR 267 north (North Shore Boulevard) – Truckee	Southern terminus of SR 267
Brockway	11.03	SR 28 south	Continuation into Nevada; east end of SR 28
1.000 mi = 1.609 km; 1.000 km = 0.621 mi

== See also ==
- List of state highways in California
