= Trout Creek Outrage =

19th Century hate crime against Chinese Americans

- Part of Anti-Chinese violence in California
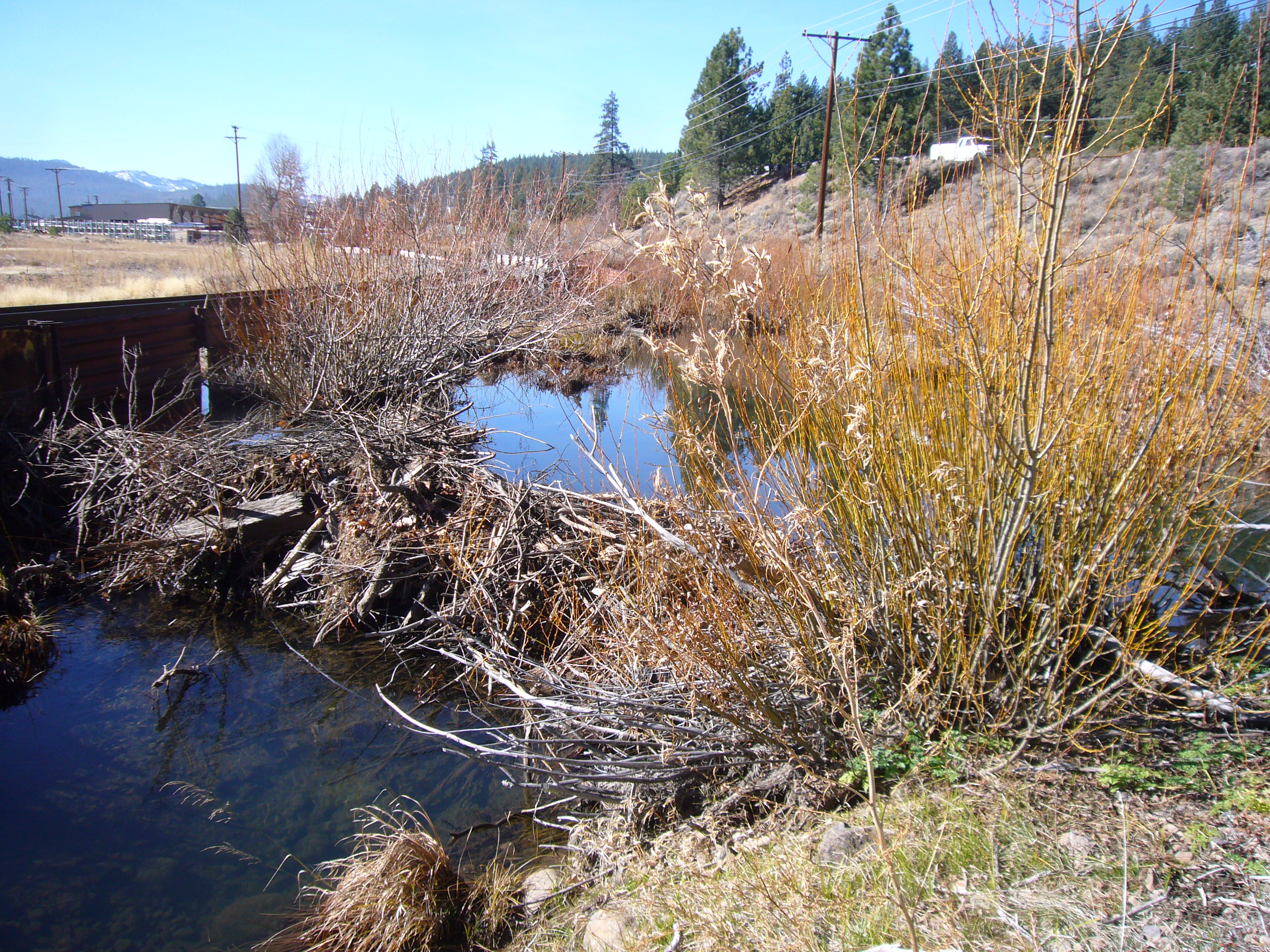
- Trout Creek (2010)
- Date: June 17–18, 1876
- Location: Trout Creek, Truckee, California, United States; 39.3435°N 120.2249°W
- Caused by: Racism
- Goals: Exclusion
- Methods: arson, ambush, mass shooting

Parties
| Seven members of the Truckee Caucasian League: W. George Getchell; Calvin McCullough; G. W. Mershon; J. O'Neal; James Reed; Fred. Wilbert; Frank Wilson | Six Chinese woodcutters: Ah Fook; Ah Joe; Ah Lang (injured); Ah Ping (killed); two, unnamed |

Number
| 7 | 6 |

Casualties and losses
| none | 2 |

Casualties
- Deaths: 1
- Injuries: 1
- Arrested: 7
- Charged: 7

The Trout Creek Outrage, also known as the Truckee Outrage or Trout Creek Murder, was an incident of anti-Chinese violence in California which occurred on the night of June 17–18, 1876. White residents of Truckee, California set fire to two cabins along Trout Creek that housed six Chinese immigrants working as woodcutters approximately 2 mi (3.2 km) northwest of the town; as the woodcutters fled the fires, the Truckee men shot them, killing one and wounding another. Seven men were arrested two months later and tried for arson and murder in September 1876, but the lone defendant for the murder charge was found not guilty by an all-white jury after nine minutes of deliberation, and the arson charges against the men were dismissed. Ten years later in 1886, the citizens of Truckee succeeded in driving the last Chinese immigrants from the city, which previously had been the home of the second-largest Chinatown in the western United States.

== Background ==
As the Central Pacific Railroad were pushing over Donner Pass, Chinese laborers began settling in Truckee as early as 1868. Truckee's original Chinatown was north of the town's namesake river, centered at Spring and Jiboom streets, behind Front Street. After the completion of the First transcontinental railroad in 1869, some of the Chinese who had emigrated to California settled in Truckee and continued their work for the Virginia and Truckee Railroad, despite efforts to displace them. Other Chinese immigrants in Truckee worked as woodcutters, merchants, laundrymen, doctors, and prostitutes. By 1870, Truckee's Chinatown had 407 residents; for comparison, the town itself totaled 1,467. It was the second-largest Chinese community on the west coast.

In late May 1875, Truckee's Chinatown was wiped out completely by a fire that started in a restaurant. The fire destroyed forty Chinese buildings and four houses on Front Street; the latter were mostly insured, though, and losses totaled US$60,000 (equivalent to $1,760,000 in 2025). It was estimated that up to thirty hogs perished in the fire, but no humans. After the fire, a meeting of property owners agreed the Chinatown should be rebuilt on the south side of the Truckee River. Although the initial effort was unsuccessful, broad streets were planned, which would "confine [the existing] Chinatown proper within reasonably narrow limits" and by June 3, concerned citizens had collected enough money to purchase the original land on which Chinatown stood and obtained an agreement with D. H. Haskell, Town Site Agent, to prohibit the sale or rental of any lots within to the Chinese. Nevertheless, the Chinese rebuilt on the burned site.

The Truckee Caucasian League was formed soon after the fire. The Caucasian League was in communication with the San Francisco Anti-Coolie Club, also known as the Young Men's Universal Reform Club. In a May 1876 meeting, the Anti-Coolie Club endorsed the recent forced relocation of Chinese immigrants from Antioch on April 29 and the use of violence in general to expel Chinese immigrants. By June 7, it was reported the Caucasian League had 200 members, actively intimidating Chinese immigrants in town and warning them to leave.

== Ambush ==
According to the sworn statement of Calvin McCullough, the Caucasian League held a meeting from 8 to 10 p.m. on the night of June 17, 1876; some of the attendees lingered and discussed how they planned "to give the Chinamen a scare". After the meeting, seven men met at the cabin of Frank Wilson, where they armed themselves with guns and proceeded to sneak up on the Chinese camp on the west bank of Trout Creek. The encampment was approximately 2 mi (3.2 km) northwest of Truckee, and the Chinese immigrants worked as woodcutters. The ambushers arrived at approximately 1 a.m.

There, O'Neal and Getchell set the first (upstream) cabin on fire; two others shot at the escaping residents while the remainder stood guard. In the first cabin, two Chinese immigrants (Ah Joe and Ah Lang) were sleeping, but woke after the cabin was doused in coal oil and set on fire. Ah Lang attempted to subdue the fire with a bucket of water, but was shot and injured, then fell and laid quietly in a hole while waiting for the raiders to leave. 48 pellets were removed from his body.

The marauders then proceeded to the second (lower) cabin, approximately 3/4 mi (1.2 km) downstream, where four men were sleeping; it was similarly soaked in kerosene and put to the torch. The first to escape, Ah Ping, was shot by the waiting men. According to the statement of Ah Fook, who also lived in the downstream cabin, Ah Ping had left the cabin with a bucket to retrieve water from the nearby creek when he was shot by two men. Ah Ping returned to the cabin and the woodcutters inside protected themselves with blankets until the heat became too intense, forcing them out. They carried Ah Ping across the creek and concealed him in the bushes. At daybreak, they took him to their employer, Joseph Gray, who sent for treatment by Dr. William Curless. However, Ah Ping died at approximately 4 p.m. on June 18. At the trial, Dr. Curless testified the wound, caused by a bullet passing from left to right through Ah Ping's abdomen, "was severe, but not necessarily fatal", but carrying the stricken Ah Ping over 2 to 3 mi (3.2 to 4.8 km) of "rough road" and subsequent treatment by a Chinese doctor may have exacerbated the injury.

== Arrests ==
Such a crime will be as fruitful of mischief and embarrassment as the Coushitta massacre [sic] was to the Southern Democrats, and it will also be regarded as a complete proof that our claims of superior intelligence and civilization are preposterous and impudent. ... If a party of Americans in China had been attacked as the Truckee miscreants attacked the Chinese, the press of the United States would have been in arms at once, and the Government would have been called upon to demand instant indemnification from Peking, while it would have been thought perfectly justifiable to back up the demand with the guns of our men-of-war.

— Editorial, Sacramento Daily Union (June 21, 1876)

The first reports were made on June 18; later, details of the crimes were published the next day, and early speculation was that "vagabonds, inflamed by liquor, committed the deed." The editors of the Sacramento Daily Union called upon Governor William Irwin to offer a "heavy reward for the discovery and arrest of the Truckee criminals", adding "the reputation of California is at stake". Less than ten days later, the combined reward was US$2,500 (equivalent to $80,000 in 2025).

Both Calvin McCullough and George W. Getchell had loudly declared their intentions to claim the reward, and reportedly said they would fabricate a story to satisfy the Chinese, then leave after receiving the reward money. According to J. B. Harris, McCullough approached him on July 4 and said he was planning to take a position as night watchman for Chinatown; after that "he would tell the Chinamen a plausible story, and wanted [me and Conard] to corroborate it; if we would we could get the reward, and he would divide with us, and we could take a walk". McCullough and Getchell separately confessed to the crime; their confessions were taken while miles apart, but their stories were almost identical.

Five men were arrested for arson and murder on August 8, 1876 and jailed in Nevada City. George W. Getchell was arrested in Lake Tahoe on August 10; the arrests were made by Captain S. Deal, Leonard Harris (deputy sheriff of Sacramento County and detective of the Central Pacific), and Truckee Constable Jake R. Cross. Calvin McCullough testified before the coroner's jury on August 14, implicating F. Wilbert, G. W. Mershon, James Reed, Frank Wilson, and J. O'Neal; McCullough's testimony was corroborated by a statement from Getchell. At the inquest, forty witnesses from Truckee came to the defense of the accused, including Caucasian League president Hamlet Davis. In addition, the five accused were characterized as "old residents of Truckee, [with] good reputations [to-date]". The men were indicted and held for trial.

On Thursday, August 17, 1876, Leonard Harris separated Getchell and McCullough, jailing them in Sacramento to keep them safe from harm and prevent them from conspiring with their five fellow co-defendants.

== Trial ==
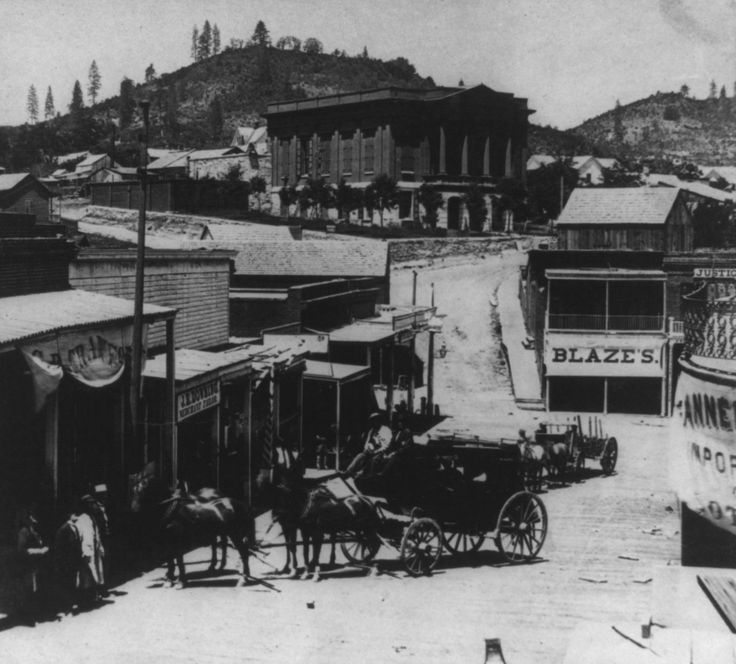
Court House in Nevada City (c. 1866), where the trial was held.

The trial began in the Fourteenth District Court in Nevada City on September 25, 1876, under Judge T. B. Reardon. Because most of the witnesses subpoenaed failed to show up, the start of the trial was delayed to September 27. An all-white jury was selected. California Attorney General Jo Hamilton and District Attorney E. H. Gaylord asserted the attack was coordinated by the Caucasian League and presented the prosecution's case through September 29. Two of the indicted men, Getchell and McCullough, testified for the prosecution on September 27 and 28.

The prosecution rested on the morning of September 29, and the defense began calling their witnesses. The defense, led by Charles McGlashan, successfully attacked the characters of the prosecution's witnesses and advanced a theory that a competing group of Chinese had perpetrated the attack; all of the defendants were acquitted. McCullough was characterized as an ex-convict and Getchell was said to be drunk on the night of the murder. Under cross-examination, McCullough's criminal record as a boot and horse thief was exposed, along with interim reward payments that Cross had made to him prior to the trial. The defense called fifty witnesses who provided alibis for each defendant on the night in question. In addition, several witnesses testified that Getchell had stayed in Andy Johnson's saloon, intoxicated, between 10 p.m. and 1 a.m. Other witnesses recounted that Cross offered US$500 (equivalent to $15,100 in 2025) to multiple people to corroborate McCullough's statement. In addition, it was noted that Ah Fook had testified at the coroner's inquest that he kept kerosene in the camp in unlabeled bottles. The defense rested on October 2.

After deliberating for nine minutes, the jury returned a verdict of not guilty for defendant O'Neal on October 3. District Attorney Gaylord made a nolle prosequi motion to dismiss the remaining indictments the next day. In an editorial published on October 6, 1876, the editor of Grass Valley Daily Union wrote "the Defendants who were indicted were not connected, by the evidence, with the acts of murder and arson. Indeed the testimony in the case showed, with great preponderance, the contrary state of facts."

== Aftermath ==
The Trout Creek outrage was compared to the Hamburg massacre. In March 1877, a similar anti-Chinese shooting occurred in Chico, California; the Trinity Journal wrote "Had the participators in the Trout Creek affair of last Summer met their deserts [sic], it is not probable that we should have to record the Chico tragedy at this time."

James Reed, one of the accused, served as the Constable of Truckee from 1878 to 1890. Reed shot and killed Constable Jacob Teeter, who had succeeded him, in 1891 after "nearly twenty years [of] bad blood"; the shooting was ruled to be justifiable self-defense. Their animosity dated back to the time when Teeter had arrested Reed in 1876 in connection with the murder of Ah Ling, and the two men competed regularly for the elected office of Constable after that. Reed died in 1905; according to the obituary printed at the time, his role in the 1876 outrage was never proven because "[a prosecuting witness] being of powerful frame, fearless and brave as the bravest, wilted in [Reed's] presence" and refused to identify him in court.

Another fire in October 1878 destroyed the Truckee Chinatown; this time, Chinatown was relocated south of the river. In 1886, citizens of Truckee organized a boycott of Chinese-owned businesses and white-owned businesses with Chinese employees; the so-called "Truckee Method" was successful in driving the remaining Chinese immigrants from the town. When the last left later that year, Truckee held a celebratory parade. The sole remaining trace of Chinatown in Truckee is the Chinese Herb Shop at 10004 South East River Street, which dates to 1878.
