= CA-28 =

CA-28 may refer to:

- California's 28th congressional district
- California State Route 28
- USS Louisville (CA-28), a World War II heavy cruiser
