= Trout Creek (Truckee River tributary) =

Trout Creek (Truckee River)
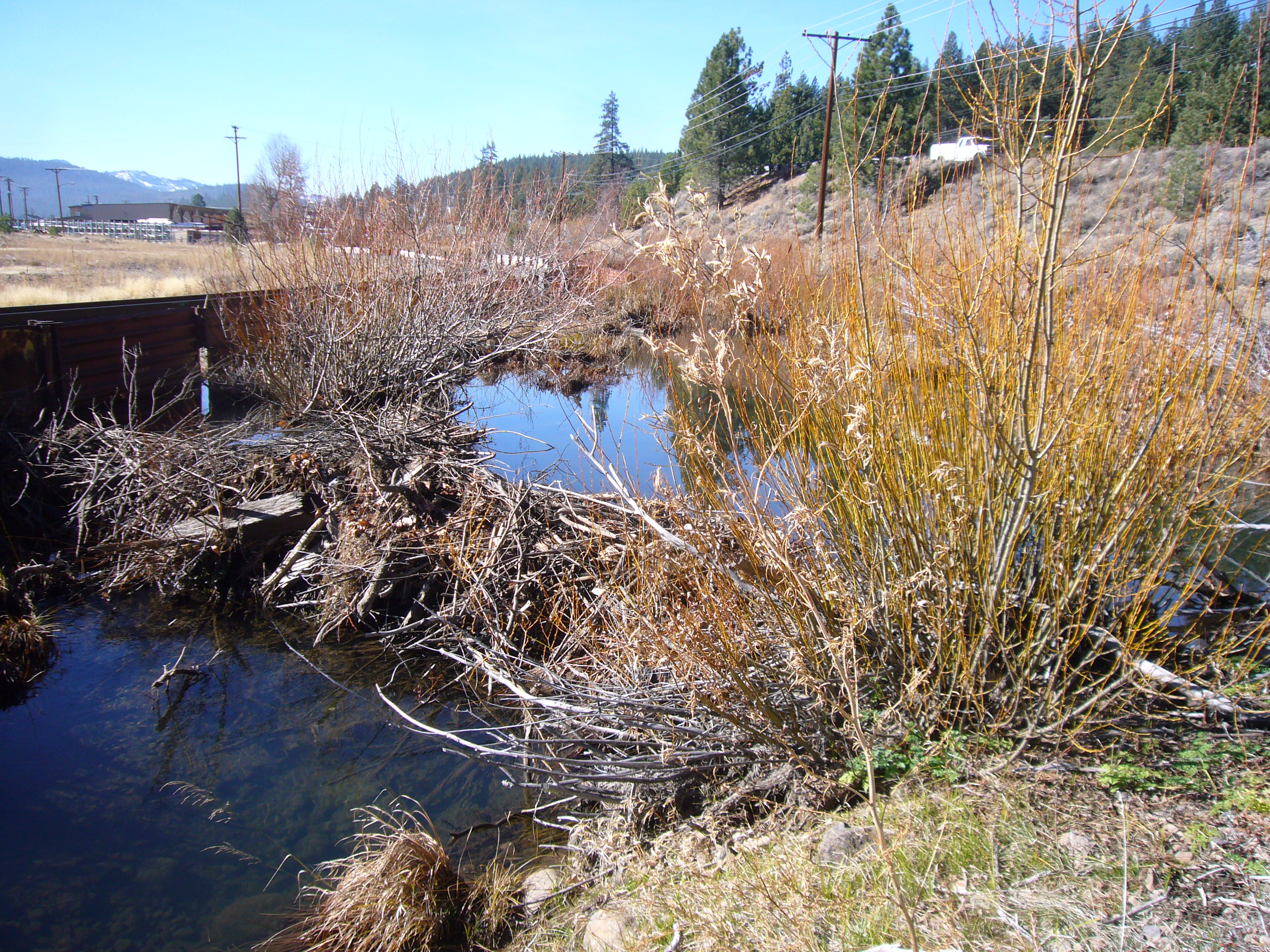
- Beaver Dam on Trout Creek in Truckee, CA courtesy Ted Guzzi 2010

- Location of the mouth within California

Location
- Country: United States
- State: California
- Region: Nevada County

Physical characteristics
- Source
  - coordinates: 39°20′49″N 120°14′46″W
  - elevation: 6,550 ft (2,000 m)
- Mouth: Confluence with the Truckee River
  - location: Truckee, California
  - coordinates: 39°19′56″N 120°09′54″W
  - elevation: 5,745 ft (1,751 m)

Trout Creek is a small tributary of the Truckee River draining about 5.1 square miles (13 km^{2}) along the eastern crest of the Sierra Nevada. It originates east of Donner Ridge and north of Donner Lake in the Tahoe–Donner Golf Course and flows through the town of Truckee, California, to its confluence with the Truckee River in Nevada County, California, just west of Highway 267.

== Trout Creek restoration project ==
Historically, Trout Creek was re-routed for development of downtown Truckee, to power a lumber mill in a flume, channelized, and used to feed ponds for ice harvesting and logging. None of the lower portion of the creek follows its original channel and a large portion has been channelized within a concrete flume between Jibboom Street and Donner Pass Road.

The Town of Truckee is working to restore Trout Creek in order to:

- Restore the natural function of the creek.
- Improve ecological value by creating riparian and aquatic habitat.
- Improve water quality by managing local water runoff.
- Provide flood protection.
- Improve recreational and aesthetic value of the creek.

The restoration is on the section of the creek from its I-80 undercrossing east of Bridge Street, under Donner Pass Road, past the Lumber Yard, through the Railyard Development area, and to the Union Pacific Railroad right of way line, which is immediately north of the Truckee River.

== Ecology ==
Observed species include a variety of birds, including killdeer (Charadrius vociferus), belted kingfisher (Ceryle alcyon), hairy woodpecker (Picoides villosus), Steller's jay (Cyanocitta stelleri), common raven (Corvus corax), mountain chickadee (Poecile gambell), white-breasted nuthatch (Sitta carolinensis). brown creeper (Certhia americana), and dark-eyed junco (Junco hyemalis) and several mammals. including California ground squirrel (Spermophilys beecheyi), North American beaver (Castor canadensis), raccoon (Procyon lotor), and mule deer (Odocoileus hemionus). The primary fish species that are present through the project reach are brook trout (Salvelinus fontinalis), rainbow trout (Oncorhynchus myklss), brown trout (Salmo trutta), and Paiute sculpin (Cottus beldingi). All of these fish species, except for the sculpin, are introduced species. The presence of highly aggressive salmonids, such as non-native rainbow trout, probably depredated the historically native, federally listed, Lahontan cutthroat trout (Oncorhynchus clarki henshawi).

North American beaver (Castor canadensis) are now prevalent on Trout Creek, and have built over 30 dams from the bridge on Donner Pass Road to the Truckee River. Beaver were re-introduced to the Tahoe Basin by the California Department of Fish and Game (CDFG) and the U. S. Forest Service between 1934 and 1949 in order to prevent stream degradation and to promote wetland restoration. That beaver were once native to the area is supported by the fact that the Washo have a word for beaver, c'imhélhel and the northern Paiute of Walker Lake, Honey Lake and Pyramid Lake have a word for beaver su-i'-tu-ti-kut'-teh. When Stephen Powers visited the northern Paiute to collect Indian materials for the Smithsonian Institution in preparation for the Centennial Exhibition of 1876, he reported that the northern Paiute wrapped their hair in strips of beaver fur, made medicine from parts of beaver and that their creation legend included beaver. In addition, fur trapper Stephen Hall Meek "set his traps on the Truckee River in 1833", which strongly suggests that he saw beaver or beaver sign. The presence of beaver dams has been shown to either increase the number of fish, their size, or both, in a study of brook, rainbow and brown trout in nearby Sagehen Creek, which flows into the Little Truckee River at an altitude of 5,800 feet (1,800 m) and is a stream typical of the eastern slope of the northern Sierra Nevada. Not only have aspen and cottonwood survived ongoing beaver colonization but a recent study of ten Tahoe streams utilizing aerial multispectral videography, including Trout Creek and Cold Creek, has shown that deciduous, thick and thin herbaceous vegetation has increased near beaver dams, whereas coniferous trees are decreased. Benefits of beaver dams include removal of sediment and excessive pollutants travelling downstream, which improves water clarity, which was shown to worsen when beaver dams were recently removed in nearby Taylor Creek and Ward Creek. Flooding from beaver dams is relatively inexpensively controlled with flow devices.

== See also ==
- Beaver in the Sierra Nevada
