= Robert Lee Burns =

American reformed convict

- Robert Lee Burns in 2001 outside a court hearing about his extradition
- Born: c. 1930 or 1931; Oklahoma, U.S.
- Died: January 22, 2002 (aged 70–71); Springfield, Oregon, U.S.
- Occupation: House painter
- Known for: Subject of an interstate extradition dispute between Oregon and California
- Children: 7
- Status: Convicted
- Criminal charges: Murder (under felony murder rule), Attempted robbery
- Penalty: Life in prison (California); Twenty-year sentence (Oregon)
- Capture status: Arrested, later released on bail, died before extradition was settled
- Wanted by: California
- Accomplices: Roger Mealman; Clifford Toycen Jr.
- Wanted since: 1975 (by California officials)
- Time at large: ~26 years (from California's perspective)

Details
- Victims: Glenn W. Carlson (California Highway Patrol officer, shot by accomplice)
- Date apprehended: 2001-01-04 (by FBI)

Robert Lee Burns (1930/31 – January 22, 2002) was an American ex-convict and retired house painter from Eugene, Oregon, who in 2001 became the subject of an interstate dispute with respect to whether or not he should be extradited from Oregon to California to serve a prison sentence originally ordered in the 1960s.

The dispute stemmed from the 1963 murder of a California Highway Patrol (CHP) officer following a bank robbery committed by Burns and two other men. Burns was on parole out of Oregon for attempted robbery at the time. When the CHP officer pulled over the group's getaway car, one of the other men shot and killed him. Although he did not harm the officer personally, under the felony murder rule, Burns was charged with murder. He pled guilty and was sentenced to life in prison in California.

After five years in prison in California, Burns was transferred to Oregon to finish his sentence for the attempted robbery charge, with the expectation that he would be returned to California when that sentence was finished. While imprisoned in Oregon, he rehabilitated himself to such a degree that at the end of his sentence, then-governor Robert W. Straub refused to return him to California. Burn settled in Eugene under his own name and lived without further incident until California officials began to make efforts to extradite him to California in 2001. He contested the extradition and died at home at the age of 71 before the matter was settled.

== Early life ==
Burns was born in Oklahoma during the Great Depression. He described his father as an abusive alcoholic who abandoned Burns, his eleven siblings, and his wife, leaving them in dire poverty. He was kicked out of his home with a fourth-grade education at eleven years old and joined the United States Army at sixteen. Despite being involved in several minor incidents of violence while serving, he was honorably discharged. From there, he turned to petty theft, for which he was arrested. He fled jail and worked his way to Bakersfield, California, where he began to rob convenience stores with his brother across several states. They were eventually arrested in San Francisco in 1954 for charges stemming from eight different states. Most of the charges were dropped, except for those from Oregon; Burns was extradited to Oregon to serve a twenty-year sentence for attempted robbery. He was paroled after nine years.

== Bank robbery and murder in California ==
In November 1963, Burns and two partners, Roger Mealman and Clifford Toycen Jr., robbed a Bank of America in Sacramento, California, for $45,000. Burns acted as the driver of the getaway car. At the time, he was on parole for an attempted robbery in Oregon from 1955. While speeding away from the area in a white Cadillac convertible bearing stolen plates, the men were pulled over in Truckee, California, by California Highway Patrol officer Glenn W. Carlson. Officer Carlson initially wrote the men a speeding ticket and let them go, but realized shortly after that their plates were stolen and that the men matched the description that had been broadcast of the robbery suspects.

Officer Carlson gave chase and pulled the men over a second time. During the ensuing disturbance, Mealman shot and killed the 33-year-old Carlson. He also wounded Burns by mistake. The men fled the scene, but the three were arrested days later. Mealman, Burns, and Toycen were all charged with murder under the felony murder rule, which assigns collective responsibility for killings committed in the commission of a violent crime. The men all pled guilty to murder in order to avoid the death penalty. All three were sentenced to life in prison in 1964. At his sentencing, the judge told Burns, "I can see a constructive individual in you." Burns later described the judge's compassion as the moment he went "from bad to good."

== Prison and parole in Oregon ==
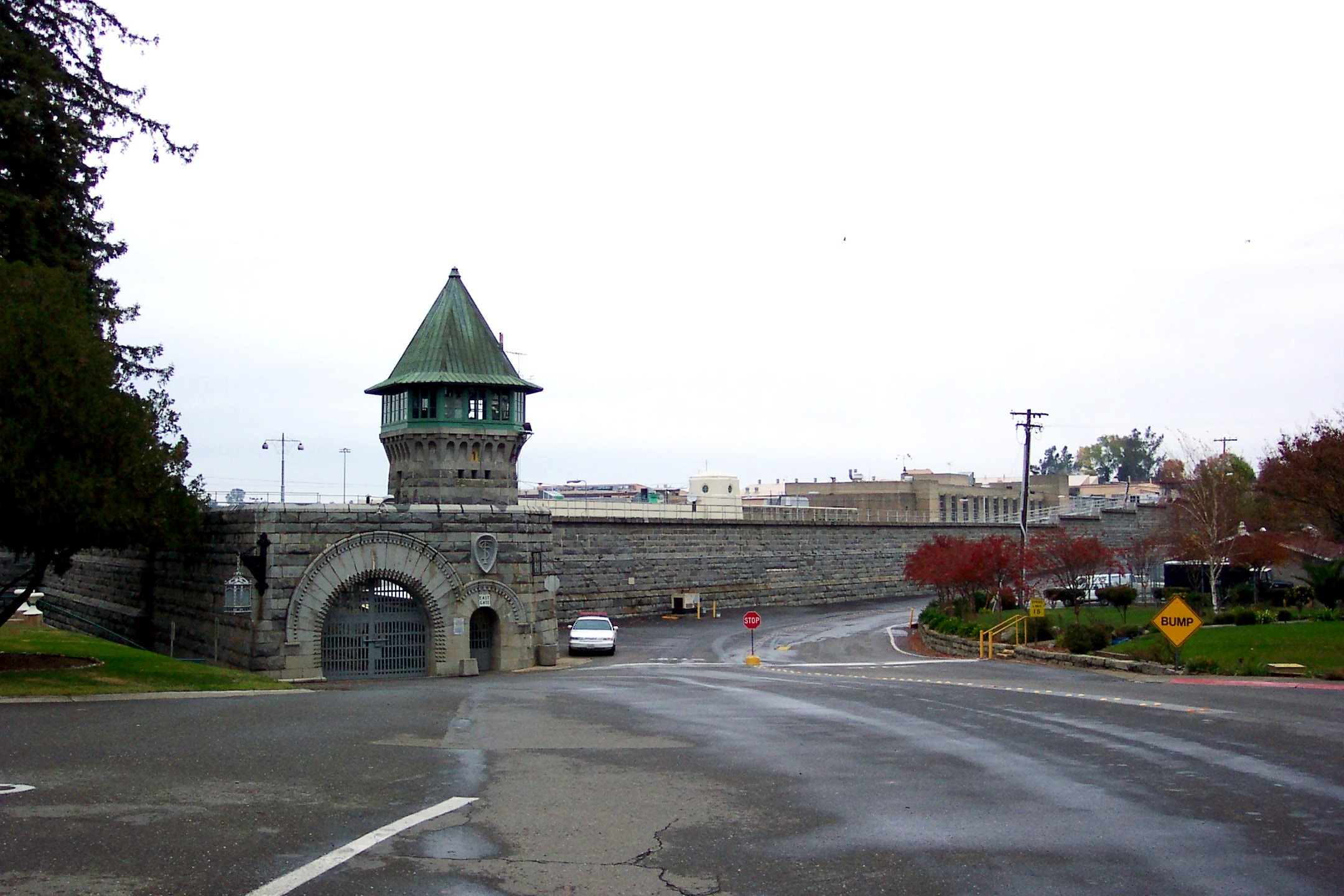
Burns was incarcerated in California's Folsom State Prison for four and a half years

Burns spent four and a half years in California's Folsom State Prison before being transferred to Oregon State Penitentiary to serve out the remainder of his Oregon conviction; at the time, transferring prisoners between states in this way was a routine practice. Officials from California had placed a detainer on him and were under the impression that Burns would be returned to them at the conclusion of that sentence, as was standard practice at the time.

While imprisoned in Oregon, Burns suffered a serious illness that almost killed him. Recalling the judge's decision to spare him from the death penalty, he decided to turn his life around. He earned his high school diploma, took courses from the University of Pennsylvania and University of California by correspondence, and read extensively in an array of subjects. He learned several trade and technical skills, including masonry and painting. He worked with his brother to start a vacuum-cleaning business, despite being in prison. He was reduced to minimal custody status and given escorted day passes to give motivational talks at schools and community centres. Finally, he gathered approximately 50 recommendation letters supporting his parole efforts from prison personnel like guards, counsellors, and even the prison warden.

In 1975, he was paroled again on the original attempted robbery charge from Oregon. The governor of Oregon, Robert W. Straub, considered him rehabilitated and refused to sign the warrant to return him to California. California officials, including then-governor Ronald Reagan, protested and called for Burns to be returned to California. At the time, they had no authority to force Straub to return Burns; prior to the 1987 Supreme Court case Puerto Rico v. Branstad, there was no way to force an unwilling state to extradite a person.

Mealman and Toycen were also paroled in California in the 1970s.

== Intervening years ==
Burns remained in Oregon, living openly under his legal name and making no attempt to conceal his criminal history. He married, fathered several children, and remained a law-abiding citizen. Burns was arrested on fugitive warrants in 1982 and 1983, while traveling for business in Nevada and Alaska, respectively, but California officials did not follow through on these extradition attempts and nothing came of them.

Although Governor Straub had refused to return Burns to California at his release, the 1987 Supreme Court decision Puerto Rico v. Branstad ruled that the federal courts have the power to enforce interstate extraditions, even against the wishes of the governors of involved states. Despite the change, California did not actively attempt to have Burns extradited until 2001. By that time, Burns was 70 years old and suffering a number of serious ailments, including heart disease and prostate cancer.

== 2001 extradition dispute ==
Burns's case returned to prominence in 2001, when California officials discovered Burns's name on a list of fugitives during a "routine review" of their records. California officials sought extradition so Burns could serve out the remainder of his California sentence, a move opposed by Burns and his lawyer.

California officials had expected Burns to be returned after his Oregon sentence was complete, as was standard at the time. Because he was never returned, the position taken by the state of California was that legally, Burns was a fugitive, as he had neither served the remainder of his California prison sentence, nor had he officially been released on parole by the state of California. Stephen Green of the California Youth and Adult Correctional Agency was quoted in 2001 as saying, "We are required by statute to pursue all fugitives," although he conceded that "previous administrations didn't look very hard." California officials intended to bring Burns back to California for a parole hearing with the California parole board once apprehended.

=== Arrest ===
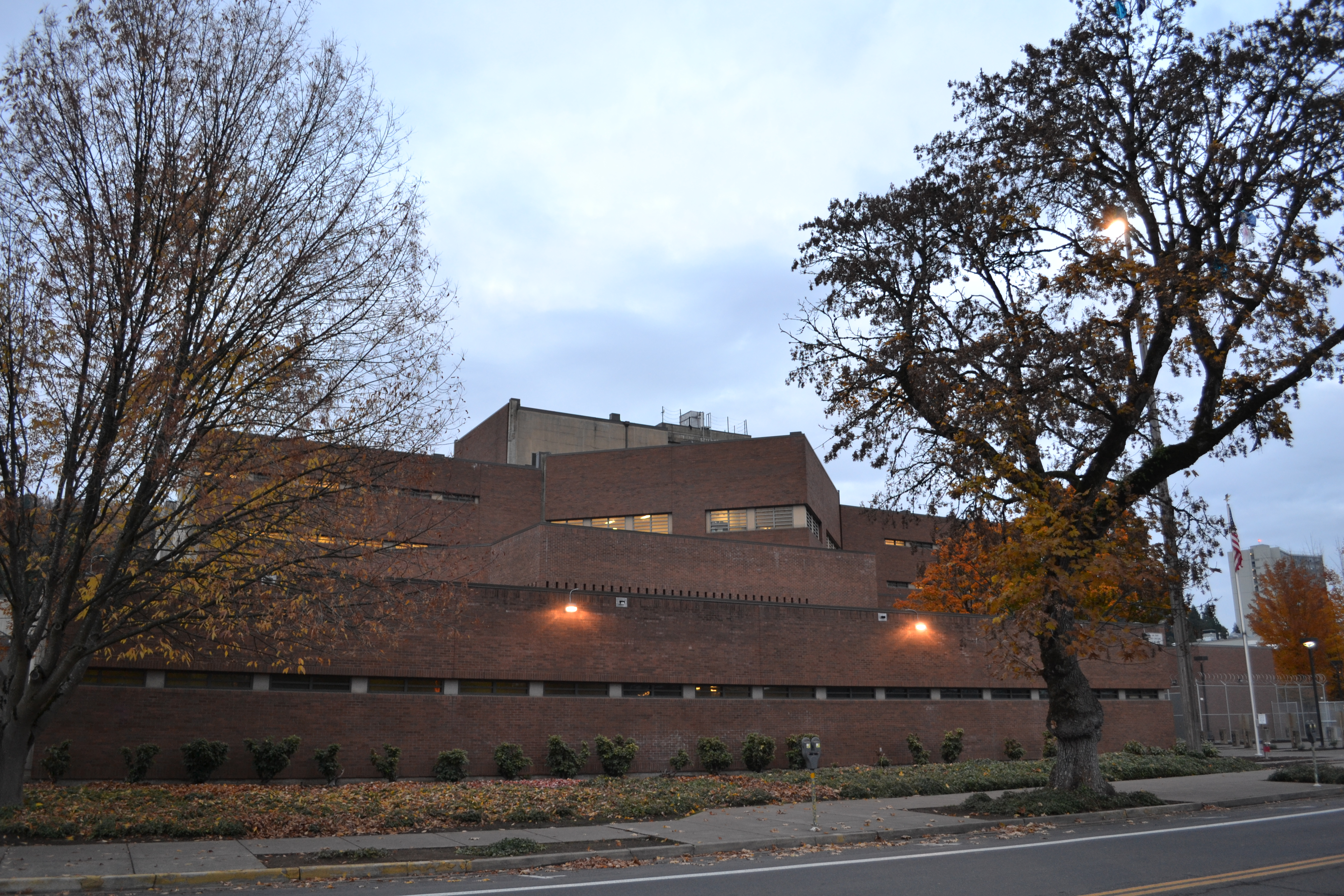
Lane County jail in Eugene, where Burns was held pending bail.

He was arrested by the Federal Bureau of Investigation on January 4, 2001, and was held in the Lane County jail in Eugene until March 23, when a lawyer paid his $10,000 bail. During his incarceration, he was hospitalized three times due to his failing health. He remained in Oregon, appealing the process through a public defender. His lawyer advanced several arguments against his extradition, including the argument that Burns, having been brought to Oregon as prisoner, had not left California voluntarily in the first place. Phillips later argued that returning Burns to California would effectively be "a death sentence" because of his health concerns. Phillips suggested that Burns would not be eligible for immediate compassionate release, and it would be at least six months before a parole hearing would be held, during which he was likely to die. Burns said that he did not expect to live past those six months, and would prefer to die with his family. He expressed remorse for the murder, stating "What happened on that highway was a tragedy. That poor officer lost his life, and a lot of other lives were devastated too. I think about it every day. And I've apologized in every way I know how."

In March 2001, Oregon governor John Kitzhaber wrote a letter to California governor Gray Davis, asking Davis to drop the matter, although Kitzhaber did acknowledge that the law favored California's position. Davis responded by saying that Burns was still considered a fugitive, and that it would be inappropriate for his office to intervene while he remained "at large" in Oregon.

In April 2001, Lane County circuit judge Bryan Hodges denied Burns's motion for a stay of extradition. He commended Burns for his upstanding life and clean record, but found that the law showed no alternative to extradition. Officers from the California Department of Corrections (CDC) took custody of Burns and loaded him into a prison van to transport him south towards the California border. In the meantime, Burns's lawyer won an emergency stay of extradition "pending a review of Mr. Burns's case by the Oregon Court of Appeals".

The CDC van was pulled over by Oregon State Police officers just outside of Medford, Oregon, about 21 miles (34 km) from the California border. Burns was returned to Medford, but officials in Jackson County refused to lodge him in their jail, citing his extreme medical issues. State Police then transported Burns back to Lane County jail, and he was eventually released with an electronic ankle monitor.

== Reactions and legacy ==
Family and friends of Officer Carlson objected to Burns remaining in Oregon, and stated that he should return to California. In an interview, Carlson's son Eric, who was barely four years old when his father died, stated in an interview that he sympathized with Burns's family potentially losing a loved one, but that he still believed that Burns should return to California to stand before the parole board for a hearing.

In contrast, Burns's family labelled the extradition attempt "cruel and unreasonable," citing his age and serious health issues, as well as his exemplary post-prison record. Oregon authorities confirmed that Burns had not had any negative law enforcement contact since his release, not even minor infractions such as speeding tickets.

Burns died at home in Springfield, Oregon, on January 22, 2002, without having been returned to California. He was 71 years old and had prostate cancer and heart disease. Although his case was still pending, his family told him it had been settled and removed his monitoring bracelet. His former sister-in-law, Tami Ferguson, stated, "We wanted him to die thinking he was a free man."

A bypass over California State Route 267 near Old Brockway Road in Truckee is named the CHP Officer Glenn Carlson Memorial Bypass in Carlson's memory. A memorial ceremony was held in November 2013 to commemorate the 50th anniversary of Carlson's death.
