= Peter Johnson (skier) =

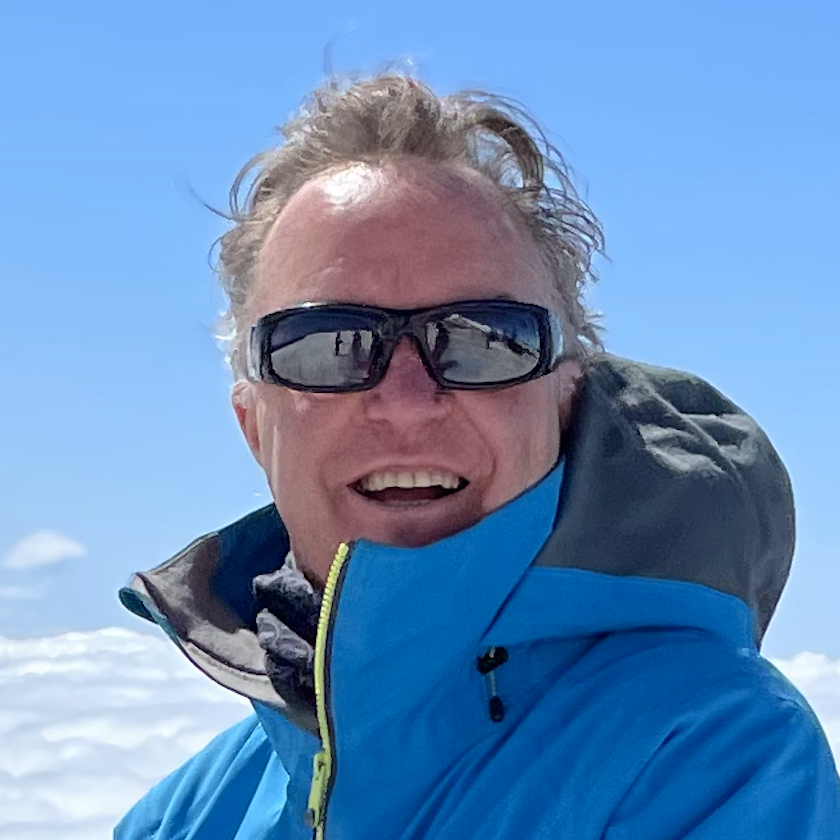

Peter Johnson (born August 20, 1956 in Truckee, California) is a former World Mogul Skiing Champion, United States Technical Delegate for the International Ski Federation (FIS) and founder of the Pro Mogul Tour (World Pro Mogul Tour).

His skiing career spans the early days of hot dog skiing, where in the early 1970s, the sport began as a free spirited form of expression, quickly gained worldwide recognition under two organizations, Professional Freestyle Associates (PFA) and the International Freestyle Skiers Association (IFSA) and evolved into the Olympic sport that it is today.

As his signature move, performed at the end of every mogul competition, he created and named the Zudnick, described under International Ski Federation (FIS) tricks as "A Nordic type jump in which the upper body is bent roughly 90° at the waist by bringing the upper body forward and down and the lower body forward and up. The toes rise up towards and in the vicinity of the competitor's chin. The skis should remain close." Zudnick has hence gained infamy as an FIS recognized aerial maneuver, subject of the Warren Miller ski film Black Diamond Rush with Zudnick the Wonder Dog and inspiration for the jacket from Columbia Sportswear company.

When the International Ski Federation (FIS) recognized freestyle as a sport in 1979, he became the first United States Technical Delegate and Chairman of a three-man international jury (Technical Delegate, Chief of Course and Chief Judge) to oversee all World Cup Freestyle competition in Canada.

The early days of FIS Freestyle Skiing set the stage for the International Olympic Committee (IOC) to select Freestyle Skiing as a demonstration event at the 1988 Winter Olympics in Calgary. Mogul skiing was added as an official medal event at the 1992 Winter Olympics in Albertville, and the aerials event was added for the 1994 Winter Olympics in Lillehammer.

In 1981 he organized a team of young Americans to ski the three highest mountains in Mexico including El Pico de Orizaba (a volcano at 18,700 ft, the third highest summit in the western hemisphere). The team included Craig Sabina and John Harlan III (renowned mountaineer and author of the book, The Eiger Obsession: Facing the Mountain That Killed My Father and subject of the 2007 MacGillivray Freeman film, The Alps).

While attending the University of Colorado at Boulder, he started the University's first freestyle ski team, now the CU Freestyle Ski Team and the Pro Mogul Tour (World Pro Mogul Tour).

He has served as Director Sportiff for the Swiss National Cycling Team, Director of Special Events for the Coors International Bicycle Classic, founded and co-directed the Look Freestyle Camps in Bariloche, Argentina and has executive produced over thirty made-for-television skiing, mountain biking and wind surfing events for ESPN, ESPN2, Prime Sports and Liberty Media.

In 1994, he created the StorageTek "16 in One" to benefit Junior Achievement - setting a world record by skiing sixteen Colorado ski areas in one day, utilizing StorageTek's S-76 Sikorsky helicopter for the Fall reconnaissance and two Bell 212s for the event helicopters.

His Boardrider Project, documented the social commentary of skateboard art on contemporary American culture with the collection of over 200 skateboards from Think, Girl, Chocolate, Alien Workshop, Sector9, Fuct, World Industries, Powell Peralta, Krooked, Toy Machine and Zoo York among others. The project culminated in a "The Underside—Skateboard Art Revealed" a retrospective exhibit at the University of Denver School of Art and Art History.

In 1996, he started the International Outdoor Group (IOG) and the International Outdoor Festival that brought outdoor enthusiasts together with some of the world's foremost athletes including Ed Viesturs, the first American to summit all 14 8,000m peaks without supplemental oxygen, Erik Weihenmayer, the only blind person to have climbed the "Seven Summits," the tallest peak on every continent, Eric Simonson, whose 1999 expedition found the remains of George Mallory on Mount Everest and many more.

IOG is the recipient of numerous awards for multi-partner and integrated marketing excellence from the American Marketing Association (AMA) and Promotional Marketing Association (PMA) and 2008 the Oregon Chapter of the American Marketing Association awarded IOG Integrated Marketing Campaign of the Year.

In 2011, among the legends of freestyle, he was recognized as a Pioneer of Freestyle Skiing by the U.S. Ski & Snowboard Hall of Fame.

In 2015 he launched Captured52 around the idea that the right photograph, when viewed on a grand scale, completely transforms the experience. Each of five seasons represented a single, large scale (40" x60" — 60" x 80"), open edition photograph from each of 52 invited photographers from around the world. At the end of Season 5, Captured52 repositioned as the most unique collection of large scale photographs in the world—260 original photographs from 218 photographers in 48 countries. As the leader in large scale, contemporary photography, Captured52 now offers Bodies of Work, a selection of 10-15 unique images from a select group of international photographers, representing a total portfolio of over 450 original photographs.

Today, Captured52 is recognized worldwide for unconventional curation, personalized service and museum quality work at a fair price—selling to collectors, designers, architects and advisors in North America, Asia and Europe. Elle Decor calls Captured52 "an ultra cool art seller with an extremely unique platform. The online store invites some of the world's most talented photographers to sell their work on their site–and that's where things get interesting."

As Founder and Managing Director of the Portland Waterfront Alliance he serves as President of the Board, leading an effort to revitalize his hometown of Portland, Oregon. Reimagining how a downtown waterfront park can serve as a sustainable placemaking venue of historical and cultural significance. A collaborative effort to elevate the civic value for a diverse community and guests—an iconic destination of world class art, entertainment, technology, sustainability, architecture and landscape design.

World Trophy Tour Results

- 1st Place Moguls Snowbird, Utah World Championships
- 1st Place Moguls Telluride, Colorado
- 1st Place Moguls St Moritz, Switzerland
- 3rd Place Moguls Bayrischzell, Germany
- 4th Place Moguls Cervinia, Italy
- 2nd 1976 Overall World Mogul Standings
