= Kathleen Eagan =

American politician

1st Mayor of Truckee
- In office 1996–2001

Personal details
- Born: 1943 (age 82–83)

Kathleen Eagan (born 1943) is an American politician who served as the mayor of Truckee, California. She is also an environmental activist and has a biography mentioned at the National Women's History Alliance.

== Career ==
Eagan worked for Wells Fargo in San Francisco for 16 years before relocating to Truckee, California. Eagan became interested in incorporation analysis which led her to run successfully for a spot as a Truckee council in 1993.

After serving as a council member, Eagan became the first mayor of Truckee in 1996, serving two terms until 2001.

In 2004, Eagan successfully ran for a spot on the Reno–Tahoe International Airport board of directors. Eagan served on the board until December 2012, also serving as President of the Board twice during her tenure.

Eagan has worked to restore local habitats including marshland and streams, including protections to the Truckee River.

== Personal life ==
Eagan and her husband live in Prosser Heights neighborhood of Truckee, California.
