= California State Route 267 =

State highway in Nevada and Placer counties in California, United States

State Route 267

- Map of northeastern California with SR 267 highlighted in red

Route information
- Maintained by Caltrans
- Length: 12.69 mi (20.42 km)

Major junctions
- West end: I-80 / SR 89 in Truckee
- East end: SR 28 at Kings Beach

Location
- Country: United States
- State: California
- Counties: Nevada, Placer

Highway system
- State highways in California; Interstate; US; State; Scenic; History; Pre‑1964; Unconstructed; Deleted; Freeways
← SR 266	→ SR 269

State Route 267 (SR 267), known as North Shore Boulevard, is a state highway in the U.S. state of California. It connects Interstate 80 in Truckee with State Route 28 in Kings Beach on Lake Tahoe's shoreline. It serves as an alternate route to State Route 89 for connecting between Interstate 80 and State Route 28 near the Nevada border. SR 267 also serves the Northstar California ski resort.

== Route description ==
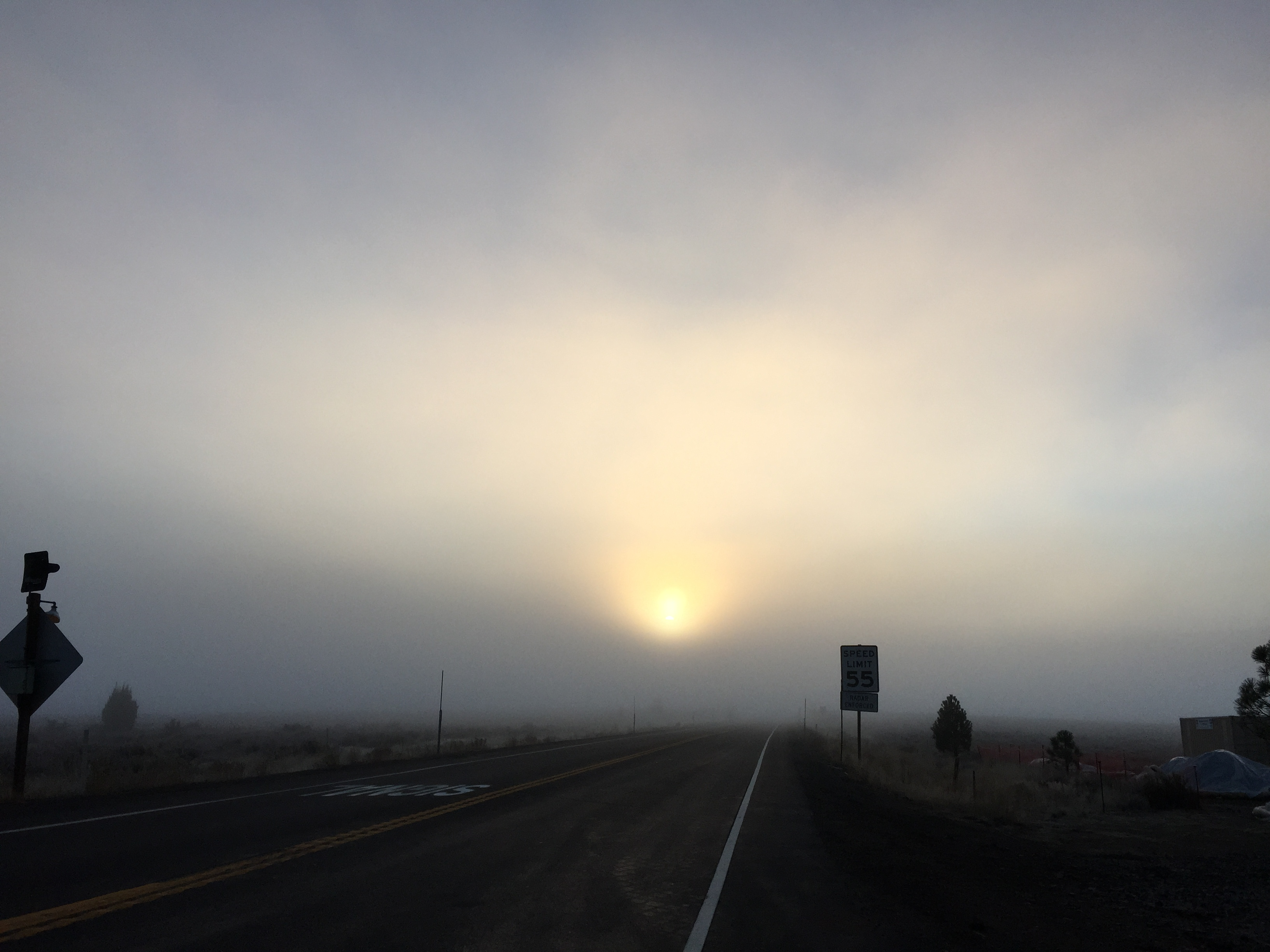
View east along SR 267 near Truckee Tahoe Airport during fog.

Route 267 is defined in section 567 of the California Streets and Highways Code, and that the highway is "from Route 80 near Truckee to Route 28 near Kings Beach, Lake Tahoe via Northshore Boulevard".

SR 267 begins at Interstate 80 in Truckee with an interchange. It then continues through Nevada County until it reaches the county line. In Placer County, it meets its east end at SR 28 in Kings Beach.

SR 267 is not part of the National Highway System, a network of highways that are considered essential to the country's economy, defense, and mobility by the Federal Highway Administration. The route from I-80 to Brockway Road is named the CHP Officer Glenn Carlson Memorial Bypass after CHP officer Glenn W. Carlson, who was killed along the route in 1963.

== Major intersections ==
Except where prefixed with a letter, postmiles were measured on the road as it was in 1964, based on the alignment that existed at the time, and do not necessarily reflect current mileage. Postmile prefixes include: R reflecting a realignment in the route since then, M indicating a second realignment, L referring to an overlap due to a correction or change, and T indicating postmiles classified as temporary. Segments that remain unconstructed or have been relinquished to local control may be omitted. The numbers reset at county lines; the start and end postmiles in each county are given in the county column.

County	Location	Postmile	Destinations	Notes
Nevada; NEV M0.00-M1.80	Truckee	M0.00	SR 89 north – Sierraville	Continuation beyond I-80
Nevada; NEV M0.00-M1.80	Truckee	M0.00	I-80 / SR 89 south – Reno, Sacramento	Interchange; west end of SR 267; I-80 east exit 188B, west exit 188
Nevada; NEV M0.00-M1.80	Truckee	M1.42	Brockway Road, Soaring Way	Brockway Road is former SR 267
Placer; PLA 0.00-9.90		3.76	Northstar Drive	
Placer; PLA 0.00-9.90	Kings Beach	9.90	SR 28 (Lake Boulevard) – Stateline, Tahoe City	East end of SR 267
1.000 mi = 1.609 km; 1.000 km = 0.621 mi
