= Brockway, California =

Unincorporated community in California, United States

Brockway
- Unincorporated community
- Location in California Brockway (the United States)
- Coordinates: 39°13′36″N 120°00′44″W
- Country: United States
- State: California
- County: Placer County
- Elevation: 6,270 ft (1,910 m)

Brockway (formerly, Hot Springs) is an unincorporated community in Placer County, California. Brockway is located on the north shore of Lake Tahoe on State Line Point, adjacent to the Nevada state border. It lies at an elevation of 6266 feet (1910 m).

The Brockway post office operated from 1901 to 1966. The name honors Nathaniel Brockway, uncle of the first postmaster.

Brockway was one of the first places settled at Lake Tahoe by American immigrants to California after the first Trans-Continental Railroad, which passed 12 miles north of the lake, through Truckee. The first road built to transport tourists from the Truckee railstop to Lake Tahoe was over Brockway summit (Highway 267), and ended at the Brockway pier, where steamers could take visitors to other locations. Soon afterwards, a spur railroad was built to Tahoe City from Truckee, and it became the first real resort community at the lake. (The old railroad grade is now a bicycle path along the Truckee River.)

Brockway has the only hot springs at Lake Tahoe, right at the shore. Old "grain grinding holes" (Washo: gámuŋ) are visible in massive talus boulders along the shore. A "commodious" hotel was constructed around 1869, shortly after the completion of the road over Brockway Summit.

Brockway was once located in two different states as surveyors establishing the California-Nevada border (which makes its turn to the north in the middle of the lake) mistakenly placed the line a half mile west of its proper location, placing Brockway in Nevada. It was eventually corrected.

The Brockway community grew and numerous homes were built in the 1920s and 30s. In the 1930s and 40s, Brockway attracted Hollywood celebrities.
