= Truckee, California =

Town in California, United States

Truckee
- Town
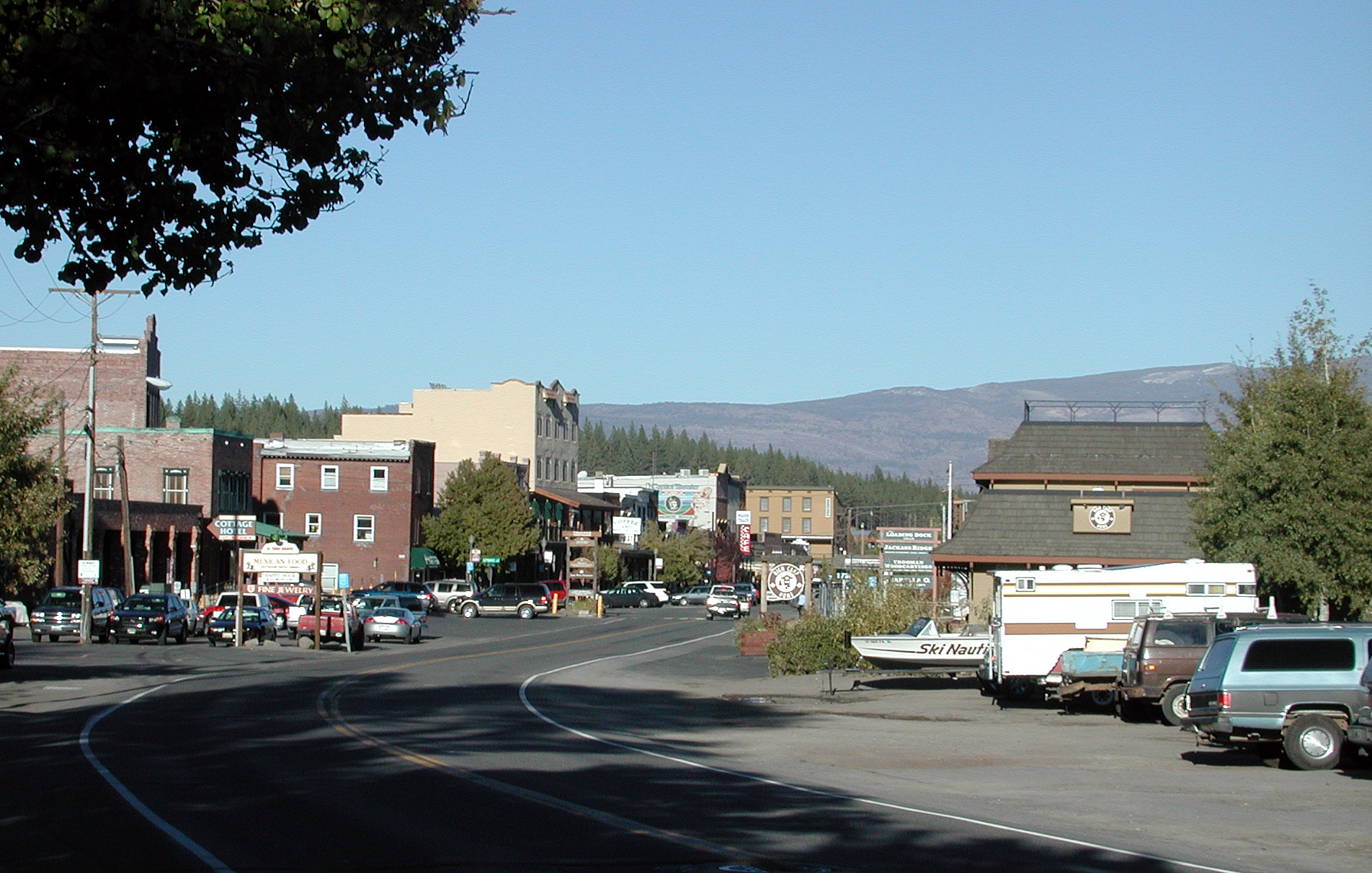
- Donner Pass Road

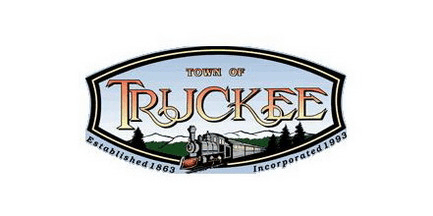
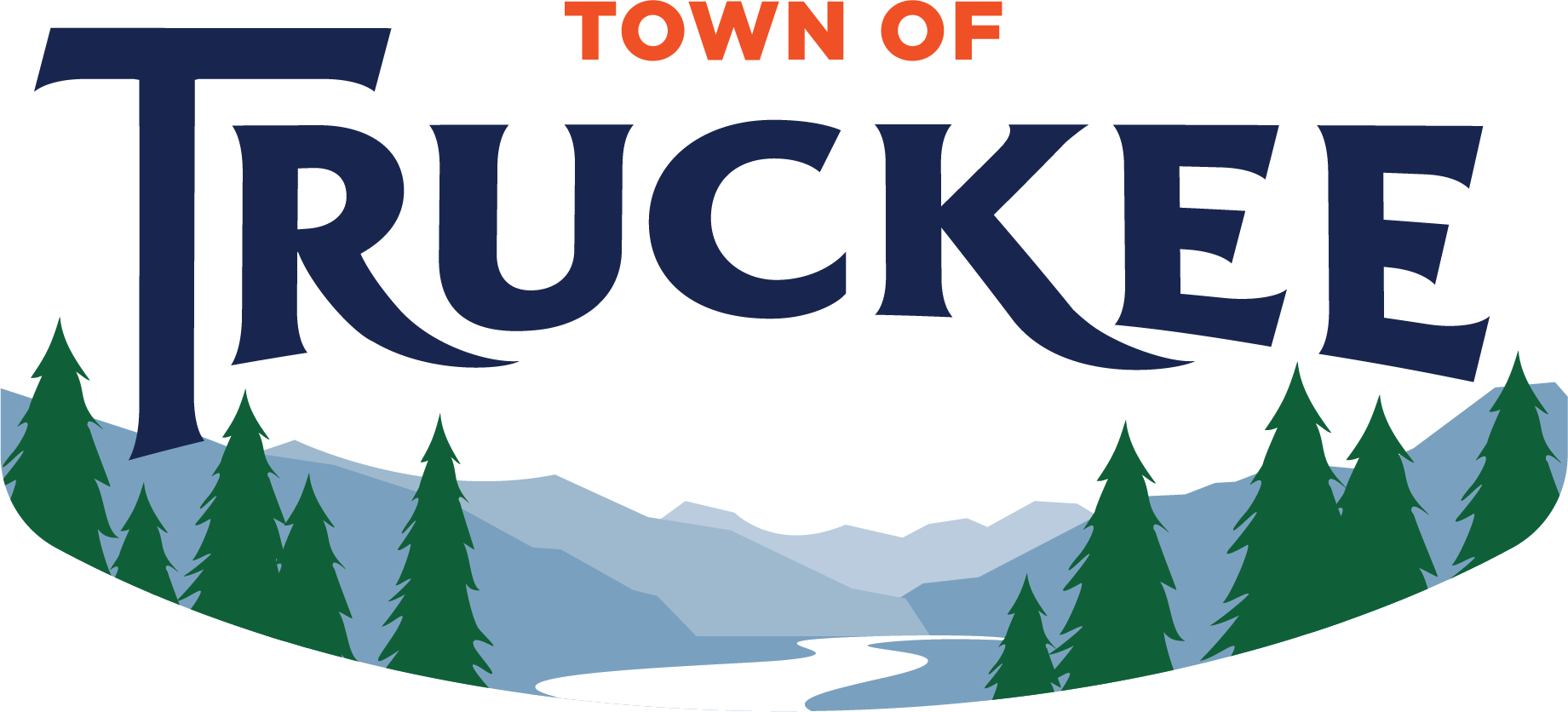
- Flag Logo
- Interactive map of Truckee
- Coordinates: 39°21′25″N 120°11′06″W
- Country: United States
- State: California
- County: Nevada
- Incorporated: March 23, 1993
- Named for: Truckee

Government
  - Mayor: Jan Zabriskie

Area
  - Total: 33.66 sq mi (87.19 km^{2})
  - Land: 32.33 sq mi (83.74 km^{2})
  - Water: 1.33 sq mi (3.45 km^{2}) 3.96%
- Elevation: 6,152 ft (1,875 m)

Population (2020)
  - Total: 16,729
  - Density: 517.6/sq mi (199.84/km^{2})
- Time zone: UTC−8 (Pacific)
  - Summer (DST): UTC−7 (PDT)
- ZIP Codes: 96160–96162
- Area code: 530, 837
- FIPS code: 06-80588
- GNIS feature IDs: 2413403
- Website: www.townoftruckee.gov

Truckee is an incorporated town in Nevada County, California, United States. As of the 2020 United States census, the population was 16,729, an increase from the 16,180 recorded in the 2010 census.

== History ==
=== Name ===
Truckee's existence began in 1863 as Gray's Station, named for Joseph Gray's Roadhouse on the trans-Sierra wagon road. A blacksmith named Samuel S. Coburn was there almost from the beginning, and by 1866 the area was known as Coburn's Station. The Central Pacific Railroad selected Truckee as the name of its railroad station by August 1867, even though the tracks would not reach the station until a year later in 1868. It was renamed Truckee after a Paiute chief, whose assumed Paiute name was Tru-ki-zo. He was the father of Chief Winnemucca and grandfather of Sarah Winnemucca. The first Europeans who came to cross the Sierra Nevada encountered his tribe. The friendly chief rode toward them yelling, "Tro-kay!", which is Paiute for 'Everything is all right'. The unaware travelers assumed he was yelling his name. Chief Truckee later served as a guide for John C. Frémont.

=== Donner Party ===
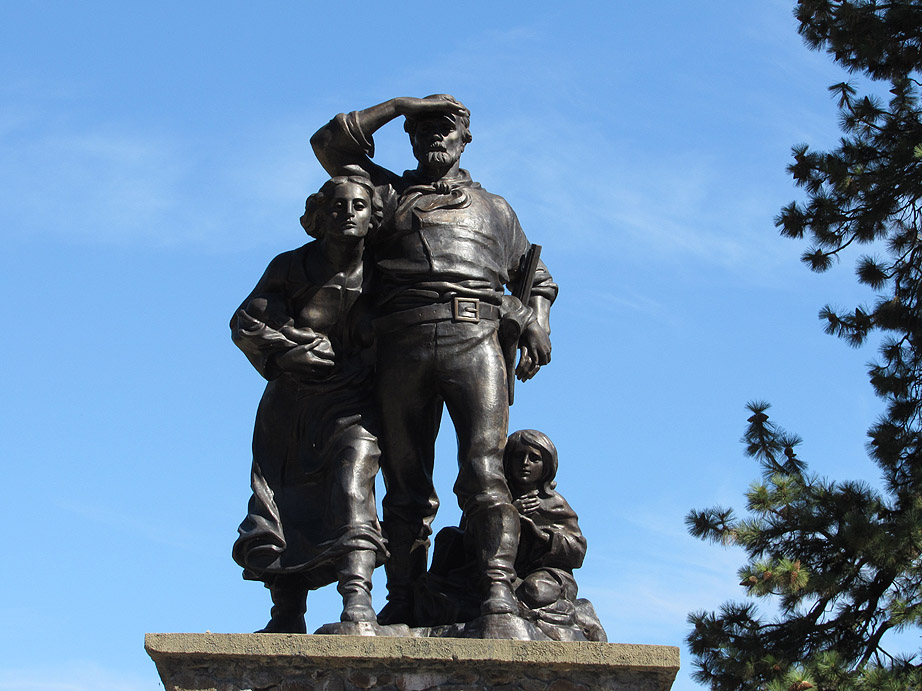
Monument to the Donner Party in Donner Memorial State Park

The Donner Party ordeal is arguably Truckee's most famous historical event. In 1846, a group of settlers from Illinois, originally known as the Donner-Reed Party but now usually referred to as the Donner Party, became snowbound in early fall as a result of several trail mishaps, poor decision-making, and an early onset of winter that year. Choosing multiple times to take shortcuts to save distance compared to the traditional Oregon Trail, coupled with infighting, a disastrous crossing of the Utah salt flats, and the attempt to use the pass near the Truckee River (now Donner Pass) all caused delays in their journey.

Map of Donner Party encampments on Donner Lake

Finally, a large, early blizzard brought the remaining settlers to a halt at the edge of what is now Donner Lake, about 1,200 feet (370 m) below the steep granite summit of the Sierra Nevada mountains and 90 miles (140 km) east of their final destination, Sutter's Fort (near Sacramento). Several attempts at carting their few remaining wagons, oxen, and supplies over the summit—sometimes by pulling them up by rope—proved impossible due to freezing conditions and a lack of any preexisting trail. The party returned, broken in spirit and short of supplies, to the edge of Donner Lake. A portion of the camp members also returned to the Alder Creek campsite a few miles to the east.

During the hard winter the travelers endured starvation and were later found to have practiced cannibalism. Fifteen members constructed makeshift snowshoes and set out for Sutter's Fort in the late fall but were thwarted by freezing weather and disorientation. Only seven survived: two were lost, and six died. Those who died were used as food by those who remained. The Truckee camp survivors were saved by James F Reed who had set out ahead after having been ejected from the party months earlier for killing John Snyder in a violent argument. Seeing that the group never arrived at Sutter's Fort, he initiated several relief parties.

Of the original 87 settlers in the Donner-Reed party, 48 survived the ordeal. The Donner Memorial State Park is dedicated to the settlers and is located at the East End of Donner Lake.

=== Historical events ===
Truckee grew as a railroad town originally named Coburn Station, starting with the Transcontinental Railroad. The railroad goes into downtown Truckee, and the Amtrak passenger lines still stop there on the trip from Chicago to San Francisco.

By the middle of the 1870s, roughly 1/4 of Truckee's residents were Chinese, many of whom moved there after the completion of the Pacific railroad. Most lived in wooden shanties on or near the town's main thoroughfare. In 1875 a fire destroyed about 40 Chinese buildings along with some white-owned businesses, and as anti-Chinese sentiment rose, white merchants attempted to segregate the Chinese residents. By 1876, some 300 of the town's residents, from workers to its most prominent citizens, had formed a local chapter of the Order of the Caucasians, also known as the Caucasian League, to drive out the Chinese. Truckee gained statewide notoriety that summer, in an incident that was later called the Trout Creek Outrage, when late one night a number of the group's members, clad in black, surrounded and set fire to two cabins full of Chinese woodcutters who had refused to leave the area. The vigilantes shot at the Chinese men as they ran out of the cabin, killing forty-five-year-old Ah Ling. Seven men were eventually arrested and indicted for arson and murder. Charles Fayette McGlashan, local lawyer and owner/publisher of the Truckee Republican, defended those accused. An Irishman named William O'Neal was the first to be tried. Despite convincing evidence against him, the jury acquitted O'Neal after deliberating for only nine minutes. The prosecutor decided to not try the others, given the pervasiveness of anti-Chinese sentiment.

In October 1878, Truckee's entire Chinese quarter, located near Spring and Jibboom Streets, was burned down. The town's safety committee blocked the Chinese residents from rebuilding and ordered them to leave town and relocate across the river. Although not the first to do so, Truckee gained renown for its successful expulsion of resident Orientals.

In 1891, lawman Jacob Teeter was killed in a violent gunfight with fellow lawman, James Reed (no relation to James Frazier Reed of the Donner Party). Constable Reed was among those accused of participating in the Trout Creek Outrage fifteen years prior.

Truckee reportedly had one of the nation's first mechanized ski lifts at the site of the Hilltop Lodge. The historic Hilltop Lodge was converted to a restaurant in the 1940s by the Crandall Brothers, and eventually became Cottonwood Restaurant and Bar. There were possibly two rope tows and a Poma lift, which was installed in 1954. At the same location there was a ski jump constructed during the early 1900s that was designed by Lars Haugen, a seven-time Olympic ski jumping champion.

In 1993, Truckee incorporated as a city.

== Geography ==
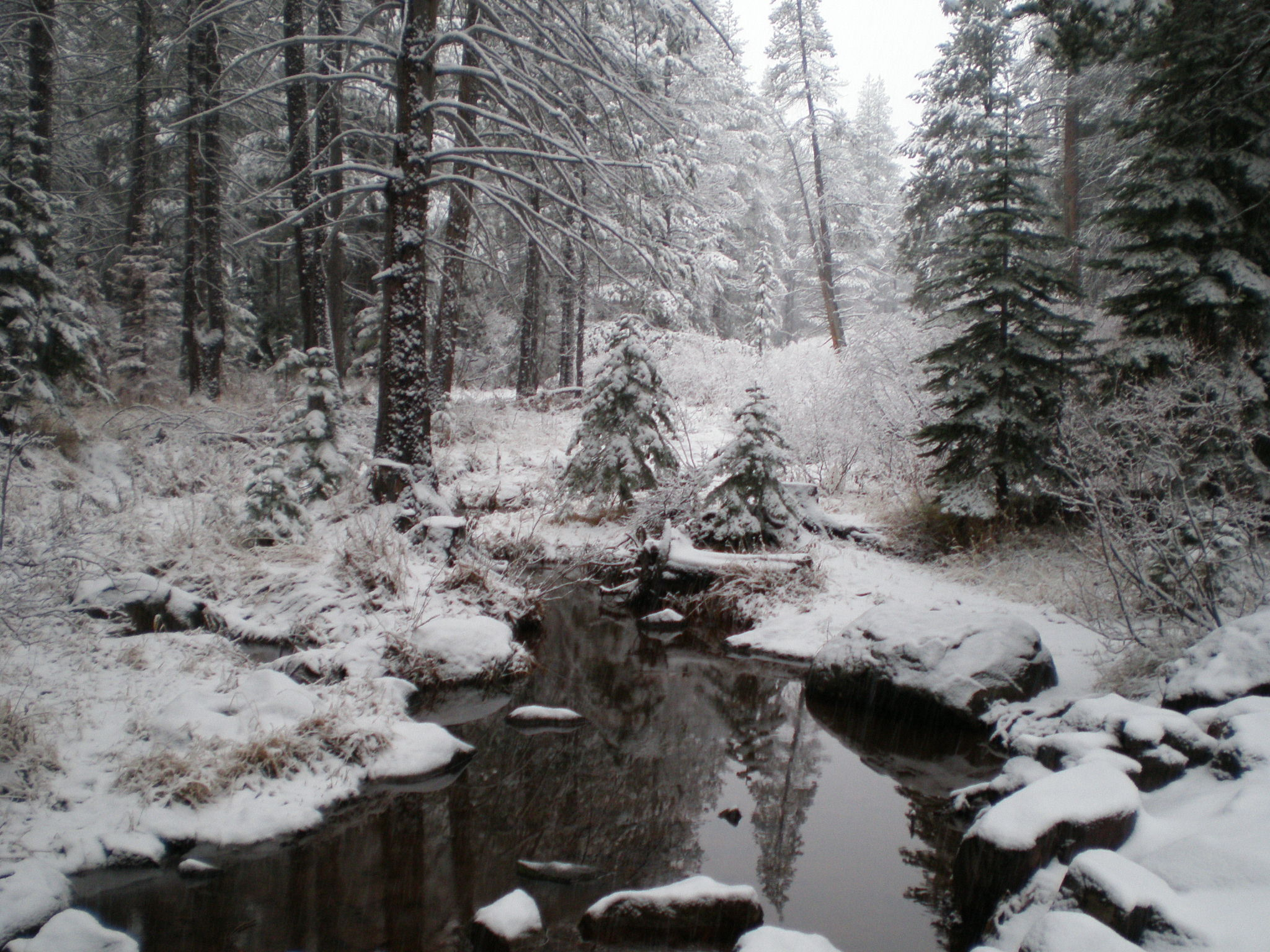
First snow of winter, Trout Creek, December 2007

According to the United States Census Bureau, the town has a total area of 33.7 square miles (87 km^{2}), of which 32.3 square miles (84 km^{2}) is land and 1.3 square miles (3.4 km^{2}) (3.96%) is water, mostly Donner Lake and the Truckee River.

=== Climate ===
Under the Köppen climate classification system, Truckee has a humid continental climate (Dsb) with Mediterranean like characteristics. Winters are chilly with regular snowfall, while summers are warm to hot and dry, with occasional periods of intense thunderstorms. Its location near the Sierra Nevada crest at 1,798 metres (5,899 ft) provides conditions for winter storms to commonly deposit nearly a meter of snow in a 24-hour storm event and the occasional week-long storm event can deliver 2 to 3 metres (79 to 118 in) of snow. The National Weather Service reports that Truckee's warmest month is July with an average maximum temperature of 82.7 °F (28.2 °C) and an average minimum temperature of 42.4 °F (5.8 °C). January is the coldest month with an average maximum temperature of 40.9 °F (4.9 °C) and an average minimum temperature of 16.3 °F (−8.7 °C). The record maximum temperature of 101 °F or 38.3 °C was on August 28, 1915. The record minimum temperature of −28 °F (−33.3 °C) was on February 27, 1962. Annually, there are an average of 8.4 days with highs of 90 °F (32.2 °C) or higher and 239 with a high above 50 °F (10 °C). Freezing temperatures have been observed in every month of the year and there are an average of 228.4 nights with lows of 32 °F (0 °C) or lower – seven more than Fairbanks and only eight fewer than Nome – but only 6.0 nights with lows of 0 °F (−17.8 °C) or lower and 15.6 days where the high does not top freezing.

Normal annual precipitation in Truckee is 30.85 inches (783.6 mm); measurable precipitation (0.01 inches (0.25 mm) or more) occurs on an average of 87.0 days annually. The most precipitation in one month was 23.65 inches (600.7 mm) in December 1955, and the most in 24 hours was 5.21 inches (132.3 mm) on February 1, 1963. The wettest calendar year has been 1997 with 54.62 inches (1,387.3 mm) and the driest 1976 with 16.04 inches (407 mm), although the extremes by "rain year" are a maximum of 53.50 inches (1,358.9 mm) between July 1981 and June 1982 and a low of 15.91 inches (404.1 mm) between July 2000 and June 2001.

Truckee has an average of 206.6 inches (5.2 m) of snow annually, which makes it the fifth-snowiest city in the United States, while snow cover usually averages 28 inches (0.71 m) in February, but has exceeded 115 inches (2.9 m). The most snow in one month was 196.0 inches (5.0 m) in February 1938, and the most in a season was 444.3 inches (11 m) between July 1951 and June 1952. The maximum 24-hour snowfall was 34.0 inches (0.86 m) on February 17, 1990.

Climate data for Truckee, California (Truckee Ranger Station), 1991–2020 normals, extremes 1904–2009
Month	Jan	Feb	Mar	Apr	May	Jun	Jul	Aug	Sep	Oct	Nov	Dec	Year
Record high °F (°C)	64 (18)	68 (20)	73 (23)	83 (28)	92 (33)	94 (34)	100 (38)	101 (38)	95 (35)	87 (31)	82 (28)	66 (19)	101 (38)
Mean maximum °F (°C)	52.9 (11.6)	55.0 (12.8)	60.6 (15.9)	68.9 (20.5)	78.8 (26.0)	86.8 (30.4)	91.9 (33.3)	91.1 (32.8)	86.2 (30.1)	77.7 (25.4)	65.9 (18.8)	55.0 (12.8)	94.1 (34.5)
Mean daily maximum °F (°C)	41.8 (5.4)	44.5 (6.9)	49.6 (9.8)	54.8 (12.7)	64.3 (17.9)	74.8 (23.8)	83.8 (28.8)	83.8 (28.8)	76.2 (24.6)	64.6 (18.1)	50.9 (10.5)	40.5 (4.7)	60.8 (16.0)
Daily mean °F (°C)	28.8 (−1.8)	29.9 (−1.2)	35.4 (1.9)	40.0 (4.4)	47.8 (8.8)	55.3 (12.9)	62.6 (17.0)	62.1 (16.7)	55.2 (12.9)	46.0 (7.8)	36.0 (2.2)	27.8 (−2.3)	43.9 (6.6)
Mean daily minimum °F (°C)	15.9 (−8.9)	17.3 (−8.2)	21.2 (−6.0)	25.2 (−3.8)	31.4 (−0.3)	35.8 (2.1)	41.4 (5.2)	40.3 (4.6)	34.1 (1.2)	27.5 (−2.5)	21.2 (−6.0)	15.0 (−9.4)	27.2 (−2.7)
Mean minimum °F (°C)	−4.1 (−20.1)	−1.7 (−18.7)	4.5 (−15.3)	14.7 (−9.6)	22.2 (−5.4)	27.2 (−2.7)	31.9 (−0.1)	31.2 (−0.4)	25.9 (−3.4)	18.9 (−7.3)	7.2 (−13.8)	−0.9 (−18.3)	−8.9 (−22.7)
Record low °F (°C)	−28 (−33)	−23 (−31)	−18 (−28)	−1 (−18)	6 (−14)	18 (−8)	15 (−9)	20 (−7)	16 (−9)	4 (−16)	−14 (−26)	−30 (−34)	−30 (−34)
Average precipitation inches (mm)	5.68 (144)	5.09 (129)	4.46 (113)	2.13 (54)	1.49 (38)	0.57 (14)	0.26 (6.6)	0.53 (13)	0.63 (16)	1.77 (45)	2.81 (71)	5.15 (131)	30.57 (774.6)
Average snowfall inches (cm)	43.6 (111)	47.9 (122)	32.2 (82)	18.5 (47)	4.1 (10)	0.9 (2.3)	0.0 (0.0)	0.0 (0.0)	0.5 (1.3)	2.8 (7.1)	11.9 (30)	44.2 (112)	206.6 (524.7)
Average extreme snow depth inches (cm)	34 (86)	45 (110)	41 (100)	23 (58)	5 (13)	1 (2.5)	0 (0)	0 (0)	1 (2.5)	2 (5.1)	11 (28)	24 (61)	62 (160)
Average precipitation days (≥ 0.01 in)	11.9	11.0	10.0	9.4	7.3	3.2	1.9	2.0	2.8	4.9	7.7	11.6	83.7
Average snowy days (≥ 0.1 in)	8.7	8.1	6.8	5.4	1.6	0.3	0.0	0.0	0.2	1.2	3.7	7.8	43.8
Source 1: NOAA
Source 2: WRCC (mean maxima and minima 1904–2009)

== Demographics ==
Historical population
Census	Pop.	Note	%±
1880	1,147		—
1890	1,350		17.7%
1970	1,392		—
1980	2,389		71.6%
1990	3,484		45.8%
2000	13,864		297.9%
2010	16,180		16.7%
2020	16,729		3.4%
2024 (est.)	17,240	▲	3.1%
U.S. Decennial Census

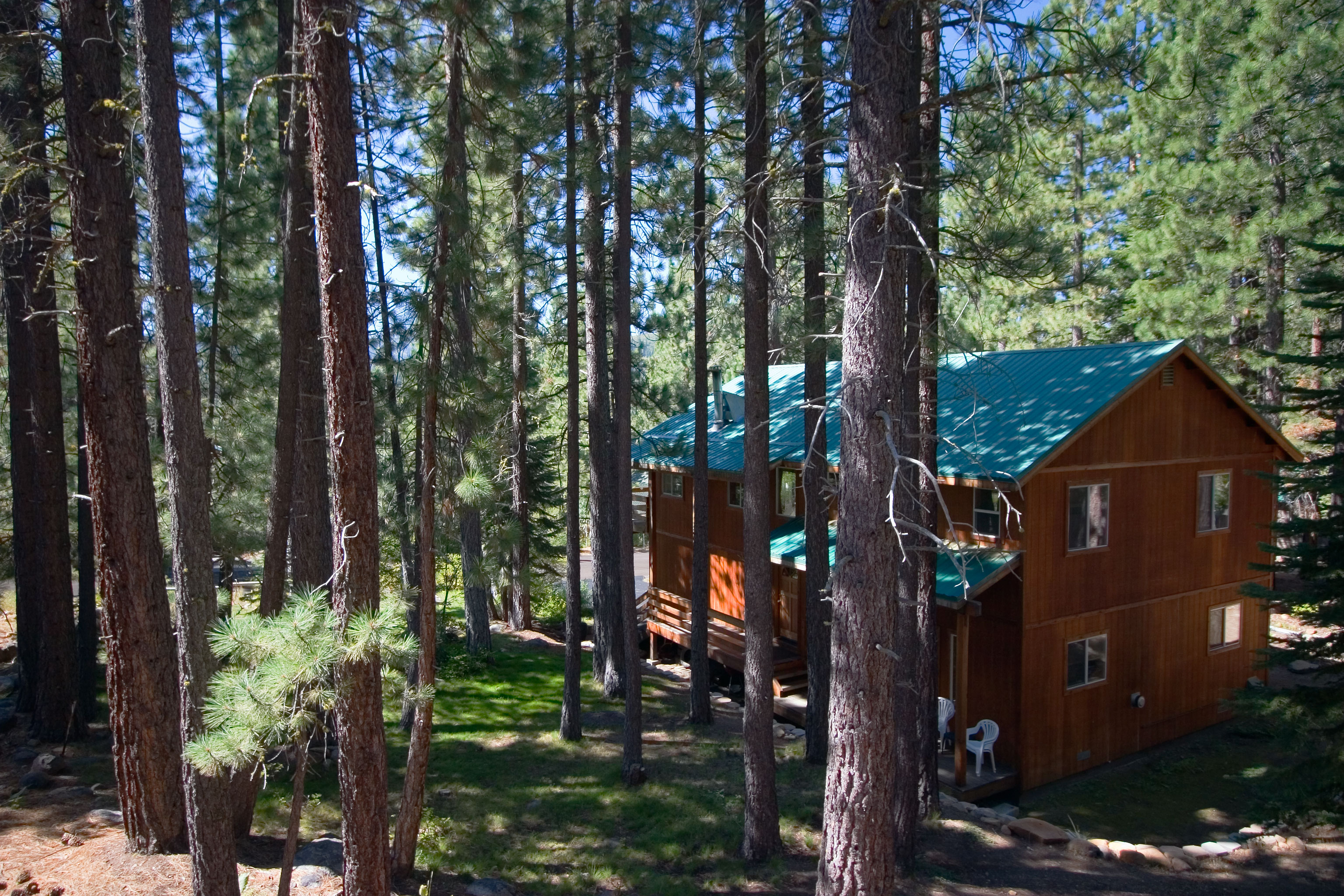
A house in Truckee

=== 2020 census ===
As of the 2020 census, Truckee had a population of 16,729. The median age was 40.0 years. 23.0% of residents were under the age of 18 and 13.1% of residents were 65 years of age or older. For every 100 females there were 106.8 males, and for every 100 females age 18 and over there were 106.3 males age 18 and over.

71.6% of residents lived in urban areas, while 28.4% lived in rural areas.

There were 6,606 households in Truckee, of which 34.0% had children under the age of 18 living in them. Of all households, 53.2% were married-couple households, 20.1% were households with a male householder and no spouse or partner present, and 18.5% were households with a female householder and no spouse or partner present. About 23.1% of all households were made up of individuals and 7.8% had someone living alone who was 65 years of age or older.

There were 13,374 housing units, of which 50.6% were vacant. The homeowner vacancy rate was 1.7% and the rental vacancy rate was 8.8%.

Racial composition as of the 2020 census
Race	Number	Percent
White	12,946	77.4%
Black or African American	31	0.2%
American Indian and Alaska Native	92	0.5%
Asian	275	1.6%
Native Hawaiian and Other Pacific Islander	9	0.1%
Some other race	1,446	8.6%
Two or more races	1,930	11.5%
Hispanic or Latino (of any race)	3,128	18.7%

=== Demographic estimates ===
Per the 2021 American Community Survey, 8.1% of the town's population were people with disabilities.

Per the 2021 American Community Survey, the average family size was 3.07.

Per the 2021 American Community Survey, 12.8% of Truckee residents had moved: 4.1% had moved within the same county, 5.2% had moved from a different county within California, 1.1% had moved from a different state, and 2.4% had moved from abroad.

=== 2010 census ===
The 2010 United States census reported that Truckee had a population of 16,180. The population density was 480.8 inhabitants per square mile (185.6/km^{2}). The racial makeup of Truckee was 13,992 (86.5%) White, 3,016 (18.6%) Hispanic or Latino, 60 (0.4%) African American, 95 (0.6%) Native American, 241 (1.5%) Asian, 15 (0.1%) Pacific Islander, 1,431 (8.8%) from other races, and 346 (2.1%) from two or more races.

The Census reported that 16,137 people (99.7% of the population) lived in households, 43 (0.3%) lived in non-institutionalized group quarters, and 0 (0%) were institutionalized.

There were 6,343 households, out of which 2,135 (33.7%) had children under the age of 18 living in them, 3,443 (54.3%) were opposite-sex married couples living together, 411 (6.5%) had a female householder with no husband present, 314 (5.0%) had a male householder with no wife present. There were 502 (7.9%) unmarried opposite-sex partnerships, and 43 (0.7%) same-sex married couples or partnerships. 1,382 households (21.8%) were made up of individuals, and 275 (4.3%) had someone living alone who was 65 years of age or older. The average household size was 2.54. There were 4,168 families (65.7% of all households); the average family size was 2.98.

The population was spread out, with 3,769 people (23.3%) under the age of 18, 1,139 people (7.0%) aged 18 to 24, 5,030 people (31.1%) aged 25 to 44, 4,986 people (30.8%) aged 45 to 64, and 1,256 people (7.8%) who were 65 years of age or older. The median age was 38.0 years. For every 100 females, there were 108.9 males. For every 100 females age 18 and over, there were 111.3 males.

There were 12,803 housing units at an average density of 380.4 per square mile (146.9/km^{2}), of which 4,326 (68.2%) were owner-occupied, and 2,017 (31.8%) were occupied by renters. The homeowner vacancy rate was 3.3%; the rental vacancy rate was 7.8%. 10,783 people (66.6% of the population) lived in owner-occupied housing units and 5,354 people (33.1%) lived in rental housing units.

=== 2000 census ===
As of the 2000 census, there were 13,864 people, 5,149 households, and 3,563 families residing in the town. The population density was 426.1 inhabitants per square mile (164.5/km^{2}). There were 9,757 housing units at an average density of 299.8 per square mile (115.8/km^{2}). The racial makeup of the town was 88.4% White, 0.3% African American, 0.6% Native American, 0.9% Asian, 0.2% Pacific Islander, 7.6% from other races, and 2.2% from two or more races. Hispanic or Latino of any race were 12.8% of the population.

There were 5,149 households, out of which 37.1% had children under the age of 18 living with them, 58.2% were married couples living together, 6.7% had a female householder with no husband present, and 30.8% were non-families. 18.7% of all households were made up of individuals, and 3.2% had someone living alone who was 65 years of age or older. The average household size was 2.68 and the average family size was 3.09.

In the town, the population was spread out, with 26.7% under the age of 18, 7.0% from 18 to 24, 36.8% from 25 to 44, 24.0% from 45 to 64, and 5.5% who were 65 years of age or older. The median age was 35 years. For every 100 females, there were 112.1 males. For every 100 females age 18 and over, there were 112.0 males.

The median income for a household in the town was $58,848, and the median income for a family was $62,746. Males had a median income of $38,631 versus $29,536 for females. The per capita income for the town was $26,786. About 2.8% of families and 4.6% of the population were below the poverty line, including 5.3% of those under age 18 and 2.0% of those age 65 or over. Recent land clearing outside town limits may affect the population.

== Government ==
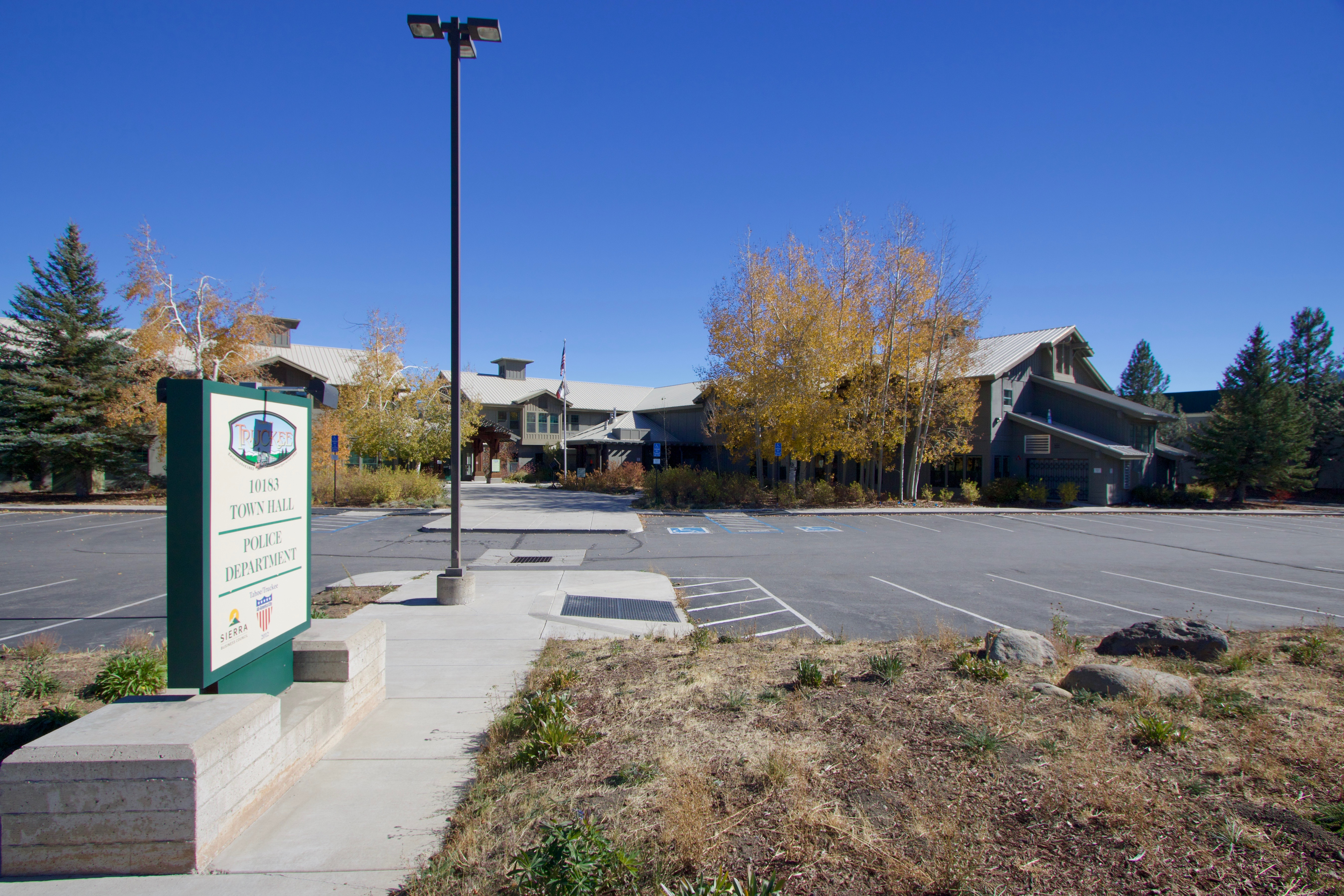
Truckee Town Hall and Police Department.

The town is governed by a five-member Town Council, which elects one of its members as Mayor; the mayor presides over meetings and ceremonial events, but has no other special responsibilities.

The mayor as of October 2025 is Jan Zabriskie. The first mayor of Truckee was Kathleen Eagan, who served from the town's incorporation in 1993 through 1995.

=== State and federal representation ===
In the California State Legislature, Truckee is in the 4th senatorial district, represented by Republican Marie Alvarado-Gil, and the 1st Assembly district, represented by Republican Heather Hadwick.

In the United States House of Representatives, Truckee is in California's 3rd congressional district, represented by Independent Kevin Kiley.

According to the California Secretary of State, as of February 10, 2019, Truckee has 9,910 registered voters. Of those, 4,336 (43.8%) are registered Democrats, 1,901 (19.2%) are registered Republicans, and 1,398 (14.1%) have declined to state a political party.

== Education ==
The Tahoe-Truckee Unified School District, which covers the municipality, provides K-12 education to Truckee and the Lake Tahoe area with six schools in the town itself. These consist of two elementary schools, one elementary-middle school, one middle school, and two high schools including Truckee High School.

== Infrastructure ==
=== Transportation ===
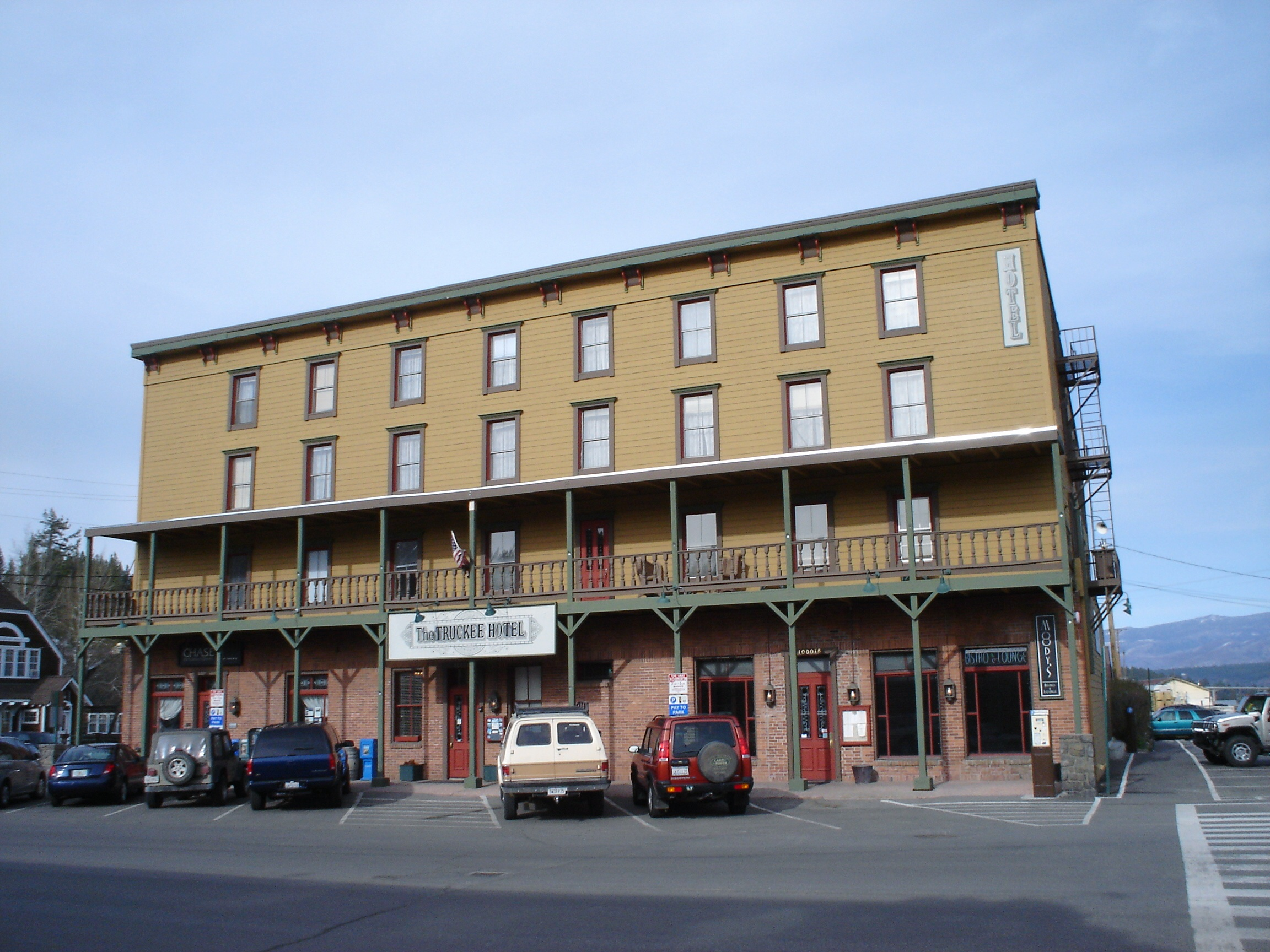
Truckee Hotel

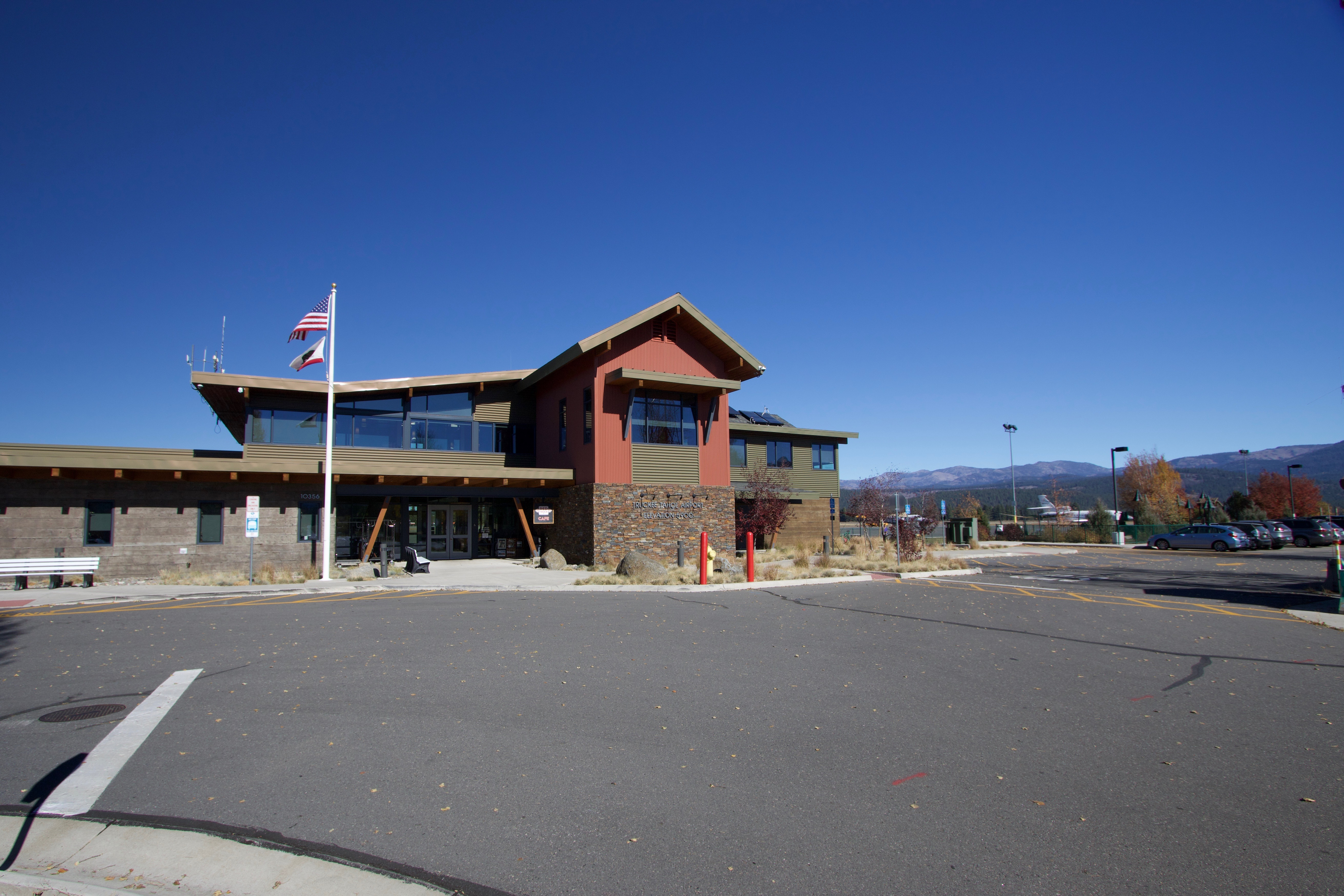
Truckee Tahoe Airport

Amtrak's California Zephyr stops daily at Truckee station.

A free public bus, operated by Placer County, California, connects Truckee station to Lake Tahoe, and to Incline Village, Nevada. Greyhound operates from Truckee station.

Interstate 80 passes west–east through Truckee. State Route 89 runs north–south, but overlaps with I-80 for 2.18 miles until it separates at the northern terminus of State Route 267, also in Truckee.

Truckee-Tahoe Airport provides general aviation to the California side of the Sierra Nevada region near Lake Tahoe.

== Notable people ==
- Krista Benjamin, poet and writer
- Bryce Bennett, alpine skier
- Alissa Bjerkhoel, litigation coordinator, California Innocence Project, Nevada County Superior Court Judge
- Rory Bosio, World class ultramarathon runner, two times winner of UTMB (Ultra-Trail du Mont-Blanc)
- Will Butler, ex-Arcade Fire, multi-instrumentalist, and composer who was nominated for two Tony Awards for his orchestrations & score of the play Stereophonic
- Win Butler, Canadian-American singer, songwriter, musician, and multi-instrumentalist
- Stacey Cook, World Cup alpine ski racer
- Kathleen Eagan, former mayor of Truckee
- Andy Finch, snowboarder
- Travis Ganong, World Cup alpine ski racer
- Chas Guldemond, snowboarder
- Jeff Hamilton, former World Speed Skiing champion, 1992 Olympic Bronze Medal winner
- Peter Johnson, former World Mogul Skiing champion
- Jeremy Jones, snowboarder
- Neel Kashkari, banker and politician
- Douglas Kelley, United States Army Military Intelligence Corps officer who served as chief psychiatrist at Nuremberg Prison during the first months of the Nuremberg trials
- Errol Kerr, downhill skier
- Ximena McGlashan, entomologist
- Debbie Meyer, former competition swimmer
- Ryan O'Nan, actor
- Daron Rahlves, a former World Skiing champion and Olympian
- Pierre Robert, radio personality for WMMR in Philadelphia
- Karly Shorr, snowboarder
- April Stewart, voice actress
- Marco Sullivan, former World Cup alpine ski racer
- Annika Taylor, cross country skier
- Amy Westervelt, journalist
- Maia Wilkins, ballerina
