= Spooner Lake =

- Spooner Reservoir
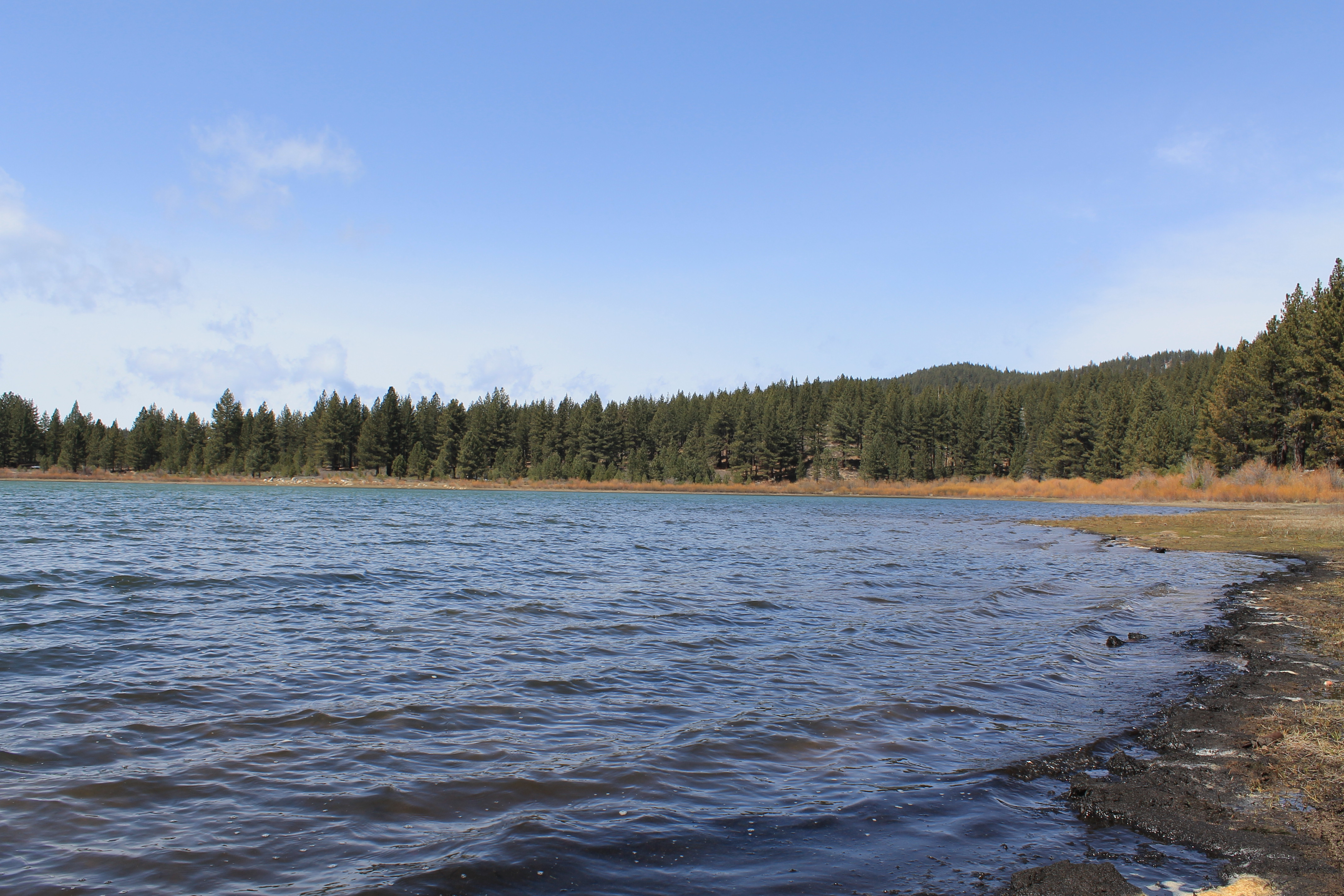
- Spooner Lake in April 2013

- Location within Nevada
- Location: Carson Range of the Sierra Nevada, Nevada, United States
- Coordinates: 39°06′25″N 119°54′31″W
- Type: Reservoir
- Basin countries: United States
- Surface area: 100 acres (40 ha)
- Max. depth: 22 ft (6.7 m)
- Surface elevation: 6,972 ft (2,125 m)
- Settlements: Carson City, Nevada

Spooner Lake is a man-made reservoir located just north of the intersection of Highway 50 and Highway 28 near Spooner Summit, a pass in the Carson Range of the Sierra Nevada, leading to Carson City, Nevada from Lake Tahoe. It is located in Lake Tahoe – Nevada State Park.

== History ==
There are historical references to an "M. E. Spooner" and "Spooner & Co.'s House" in the area, but the first documented eponymous reference was "a strip of productive land extends back from the lake for a distance of 2 miles, where it is called Spooner's Meadow". A dam constructed in 1927 to store irrigation water converted the eastern part of Spooner Meadow into a small lake. Spooner Lake has been used for recreational fishing since the 1930s.

== Watershed and Geographical characteristics ==
The Spooner Lake watershed is approximately 1 square mile (2.6 km^{2}). Peak flows from the lake are limited by Spooner Dam. The dam was re-built in 1982 due to leakage.

Spooner Lake is positioned 6,972 feet (2,125 m) above sea level. It is fed by numerous seeps and snowmelt, and its outflow below Spooner Dam is to North Canyon Creek in Spooner Meadow. North Canyon Creek then heads west, then northwest along Highway 28, before turning to the southwest and flowing down Slaughterhouse Canyon to Glenbook and Lake Tahoe. The creek flows through the Toiyabe National Forest on its journey to Lake Tahoe. The reservoir covers approximately 100 acres (40 ha) and has a maximum depth of 22 feet (6.7 m).

== Recreation ==
In 1973, the Nevada Department of Wildlife began stocking Spooner Lake with trout. Trout species include the native Lahontan cutthroat trout (Oncorhynchus clarkii henshawi), as well as multiple non-native species and hybrids including rainbow trout (Oncorhynchus mykiss), brown trout (Salmo trutta), bowcutt trout (rainbow x cutthroat), brook trout (Salvenlinus fontinalis), and tiger trout (brown x brook). However, the lake's shallowness has made trout overwintering difficult and native Lahontan tui chub (Gila bicolor) have come to dominate the lake's fish species. Regulations changed from general (allowing harvest) to zero-harvest in 1982, then to a 5 fish limit in 2006.

Spooner Lake is at the start of a 5 miles (8.0 km) hiking trail to Marlette Lake via North Canyon and the Tahoe Rim Trail.

== See also ==
- Lake Tahoe - Nevada State Park
- Tahoe Rim Trail
