= North Canyon Creek =

North Canyon Creek Slaughterhouse Creek

Location
- Country: United States
- State: Nevada
- Cities: Carson City, Glenbrook

Physical characteristics
- Source: West flank Snow Valley Peak
  - location: Carson Range of the Sierra Nevada
  - coordinates: 39°06′01″N 119°56′49″W
  - elevation: 8,650 ft (2,640 m)
- Mouth
  - location: Lake Tahoe
  - coordinates: 39°09′23″N 119°53′21″W
  - elevation: 6,230 ft (1,900 m)

Basin features
- Tributaries
  - left: Outflow from Spooner Lake
  - right: Secret Harbor Creek

North Canyon Creek is a 6.8-mile-long (10.9 km) southwestward-flowing stream originating on Snow Valley Peak in the Carson Range of the Sierra Nevada. Most of the stream is in Carson City, Nevada, United States. It is a tributary stream of Lake Tahoe culminating at Glenbrook in Douglas County on Tahoe's Nevada shore.

== History ==
North Canyon Creek's lower portion is designated as Slaughterhouse Creek on USGS maps, the latter name referring to a place where cattle were butchered.

The aggressive logging activities of the Comstock Era (1860–1900) had major impacts on North Canyon Creek. In 1870, a flume was constructed within North Canyon to transport fallen logs and supply water to Spooner Lake where lumber could be transported east to Spooner Summit where they could be sent down the Clear Creek Flume to the Carson City lumberyards. Originally a shingle and mill site, much of the Spooner Lake and Glenbrook area became controlled by the Carson Tahoe Lumber and Fluming Company (CTLFC), a monopoly lumber business during the Comstock Era owning nearly one-fifth of the basin lands. Large stands of timber along the east shore of Lake Tahoe were cut during the mid-1870s and most of the clear cutting was completed by the 1880s, with the Glenbrook Railroad transported logs from the lower elevations to Spooner Summit.

== Watershed and course ==
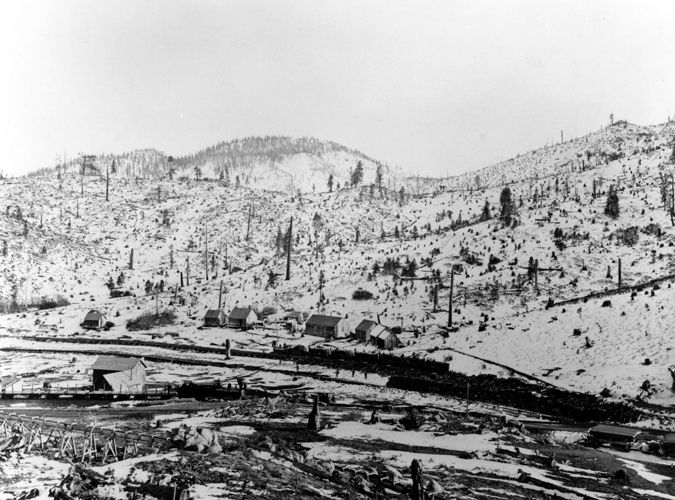
The mountains around Spooner Summit in the Carson Range of the Sierra Nevada were clear-cut to provide lumber for Comstock Era Carson and Virginia Cities. Note the Carson and Tahoe Lumber and Fluming Company railroad moving lumber from Lake Tahoe and Spooner Lake to Carson City. Photo by Carleton E. Watkins, Courtesy of Nevada Historical Society

North Canyon Creek's source is on the western flank of Snow Valley Peak at 8,650 feet (2,640 m), and flows southerly down North Canyon from just below Marlette Lake to Spooner Meadow, where it receives outflows from Spooner Lake. The upper reaches receive flows from a Comstock era man-made diversion from upper Secret Harbor Creek into North Canyon Creek. The diversion increased the watershed catchment area from 2.5 square miles (6.5 km^{2}) to 4 square miles (10 km^{2}). Just north of the intersection of Highway 50 and Highway 28, North Canyon Creek enters Spooner Meadow where it receives outflows from Spooner Lake, a man-made reservoir formed by a dam built in the 1860s. The Spooner Lake watershed is approximately 1 square mile (2.6 km^{2}) but peak flows from the lake are limited by Spooner Dam. Since the 1930s Spooner Lake has been used to store water for irrigation and recreational fishing.

At Spooner Meadow, North Canyon Creek turns west and then northwest along Highway 28 before turning to the southwest and flowing down Slaughterhouse Canyon to Glenbrook and Lake Tahoe. The stream flows throw the Toiyabe National Forest and Lake Tahoe – Nevada State Park.

== Habitat and wildlife ==
Historical beaver dams in Spooner Meadow indicate past use by this semi-aquatic mammal and would likely have acted to increase the watered area of the meadow. In the early 20th century, rancher Charles Fulstone hired a caretaker to control the beaver population, and construct fences and irrigation ditches in the meadow. This information is consistent with recent physical evidence that beaver were historically present in the Sierra Nevada, as well as historical observer records from the northern to southern ends of this mountain range.

Mammals currently inhabiting North Canyon Creek include the American marten (Martes americana), northern flying squirrel (Glaucomys sabrinus), Douglas squirrel (Tamiasciurus douglasii), Allen's chipmunk (Tamias senex), alpine chipmunk (Tamias alpinus), golden-mantled ground squirrel (Spermophilus lateralis), gray squirrel (Sciurus griseus), and multiple bat species, snowshoe hare (Lepus americanus), mountain cottontail (Sylvilagus nuttallii), bobcat (Lynx rufus), puma (Puma concolor), black bear (Ursus americanus), gray fox (Urocyon cinereoargenteus), mule deer (Odocoileus hemionus), long-tailed weasel (Mustela frenata), coyote (Canis latrans), raccoon (Procyon lotor), and Trowbridge's shrew (Sorex trowbridgii).

Non-native brook trout (Salvelinus fontinalis) is the only fish known to occupy North Canyon Creek in recent times. Brook trout prey on native Lahontan cutthroat trout (Oncorhynchus clarkii henshawi) and compete with them for food. Spooner Lake is stocked with multiple trout species but the native Lahontan tui chub (Gila bicolor) has come to dominate the lake.

== Trails and recreation ==
Marlette Lake Trail in North Canyon begins at Spooner Lake and climbs due north through aspen groves for 4.5 miles (7.2 km) about 1,200 feet (370 m) elevation to a ridge overlooking North Canyon, and finally down into Marlette Lake. Alternatively, one can ascend the west flank of Snow Valley Peak.

== See also ==
- List of Lake Tahoe inflow streams
