= Sands Hall =

American dramatist

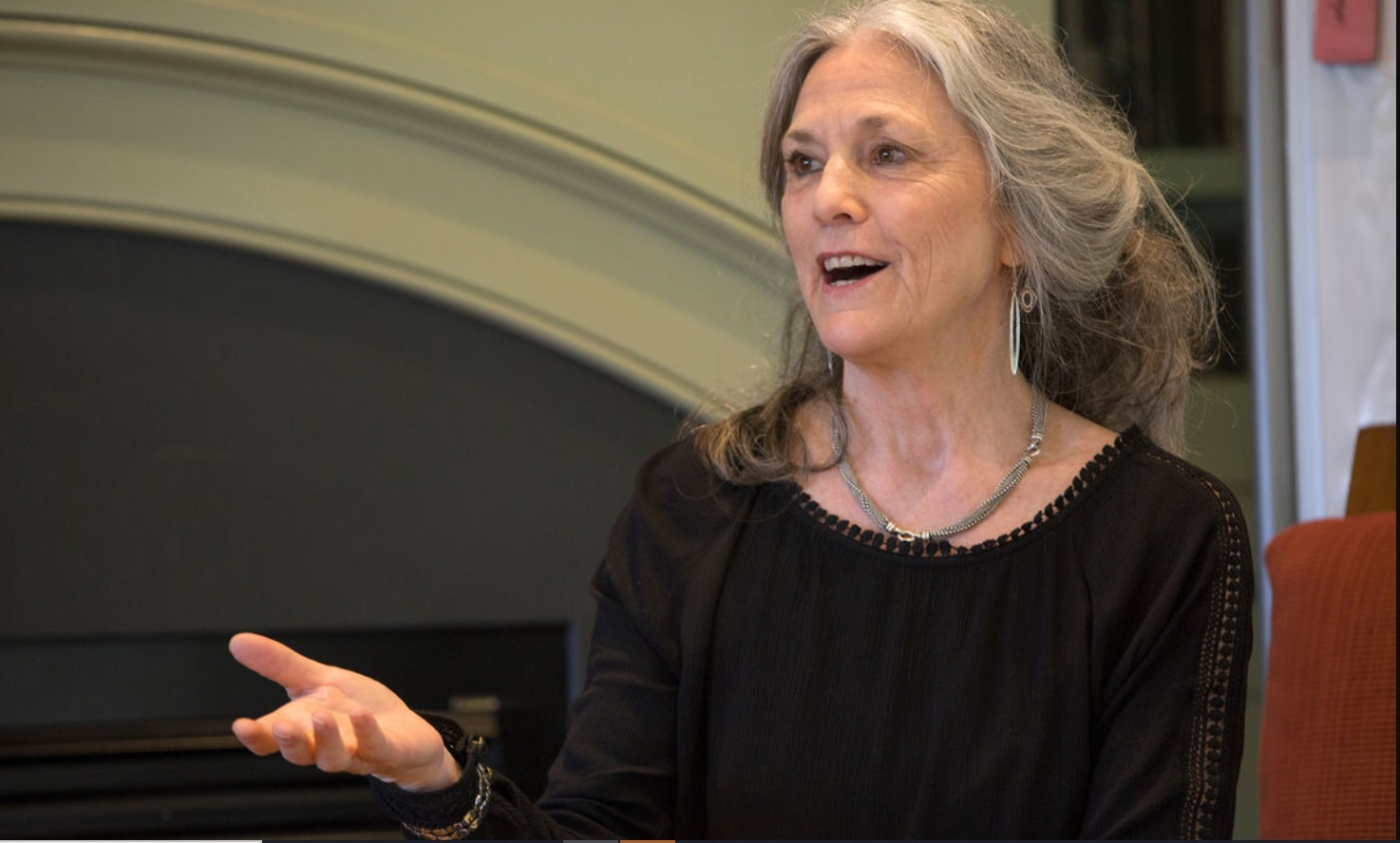
- Born: July 17, 1952 (age 74); La Jolla, California, U.S.
- Education: University of California, Irvine (BA); University of Iowa (MA, MFA)
- Occupations: Writer; theatre director; actor; musician
- Website: sandshall.com

Sands Hall (born April 17, 1952) is an American writer, theatre director, actor, and musician.

== Biography ==
The daughter of novelist Oakley Hall, she was born in La Jolla, California, and graduated magna cum laude with a Bachelor of Arts in Drama from the University of California, Irvine. She earned two Master of Fine Arts degrees from the University of Iowa, one in Theatre Arts and the second in Fiction from the Iowa Writers' Workshop. She also studied at the American Conservatory Theater's Advanced Training Program.

Hall's writing work includes the play Fair Use, which explores the plagiarism in Wallace Stegner's Angle of Repose, and the novel Catching Heaven, a Random House Reader's Circle selection and a 2001 Willa Award Finalist for Best Contemporary Fiction.

Hall previously taught at the University of California, Davis Extension. She has taught for nearly three decades at the Iowa Summer Writing Festival, with the exception of 2024, and is co-director of the Memoir/Nonfiction Programs at the Community of Writers.

Hall’s theatre work includes acting with the Oregon Shakespeare Festival, Colorado Shakespeare Festival, Lake Tahoe Shakespeare Festival, the Old Globe Theatre, Lexington Conservatory Theatre, and internationally at the Maxim Gorky Theatre in Vladivostok, Russia.

She has acted and directed for the Lake Tahoe Shakespeare Festival and the Colorado Shakespeare Festival, and has performed with the B Street Theatre in Sacramento. Hall was formerly an Affiliate Artist with the Foothill Theatre Company in Nevada City, California, until its closure in 2008. She currently directs for Sierra Stages/Sierra Theatre Company.

She is Professor Emerita of English and Creative Writing at Franklin & Marshall College in Lancaster, Pennsylvania, where she taught from 2008 until her retirement in 2020.

== Career and scholarly work ==
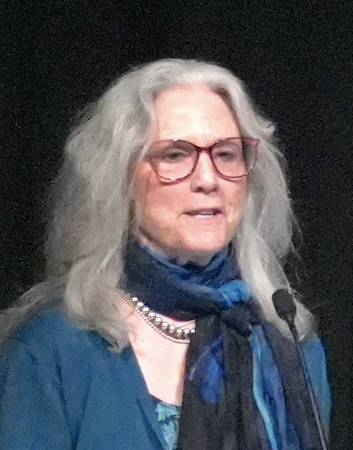
Hall in 2025

Her debut novel, Catching Heaven (Ballantine), was selected as a Penguin/Random House Reader’s Circle Selection and was a finalist for the Willa Award for Best Contemporary Fiction. Hall has also authored Tools of the Writer’s Craft (Moving Finger Press), a collection of essays and exercises for writers, which is used in creative writing courses and workshops. She is the author of the memoir Flunk. Start.: Reclaiming My Decade Lost in Scientology, originally published in 2018. The book recounts her ten-year involvement with the Church of Scientology and has been reissued in paperback under the revised title Reclaiming My Decade Lost in Scientology, accompanied by a new cover design.

The memoir was named a Best Book in Religion and Spirituality by Publishers Weekly, was a finalist for the Northern California Book Award in Creative Nonfiction, and was long-listed for the Golden Poppy Award in Nonfiction.

In drama, Hall’s stage work includes her adaptation of Little Women by Louisa May Alcott, which has received multiple productions, and Fair Use, a play examining the literary controversy surrounding Wallace Stegner’s Angle of Repose and its use of materials by Mary Hallock Foote. Her essay on this subject, The Ways of Fiction Are Devious Indeed, was published in Alta Journal and received critical acclaim.

The essay received recognition, winning third place in Investigative Reporting at the 2023 San Francisco Press Club's 46th Annual Greater Bay Area Journalism Awards. It was also recognized with an Eddie Award in the Essays and Criticism category at Folio's Eddie and Ozzie Awards. The essay was also recognized at the Los Angeles Press Club's National Arts & Entertainment Journalism.

Hall has directed theatrical productions ranging from classical works, including those by Shakespeare and Giraudoux, to new plays by contemporary writers. She also has a background in acting, with an extensive resume in regional and academic theatre.

== Views and opinions ==
Hall has written and spoken extensively on topics related to religion, literature, authorship, and the creative process. In her memoir Reclaiming My Decade Lost in Scientology, she offers a personal critique of the Church of Scientology, reflecting on themes of belief, autonomy, and psychological manipulation. She has addressed the allure of high-demand organizations and the challenges of disentangling from them, often emphasizing the importance of critical thinking and personal agency. In her essays and lectures, Hall has explored questions of literary ethics and authorship. Her play Fair Use and related essay, “The Ways of Fiction Are Devious Indeed,” engage with the controversy surrounding Wallace Stegner’s use of historical source material from Mary Hallock Foote, raising broader questions about intellectual ownership, attribution, and the boundaries of artistic license. As a teacher and writing mentor, Hall advocates for empathy, discipline, and honesty in storytelling. She emphasizes the role of craft and revision in creative writing and encourages writers to confront complex emotional truths in their work. In public interviews and musical performances, Hall often reflects on themes such as love, loss, spiritual searching, and resilience, grounding her views in both personal experience and broader cultural critique.

== Music ==
She refers to her influences as the "three j's": Joan Baez, Judy Collins, and Joni Mitchell. When not performing her own songs, she chooses murder ballads and story songs, like "Long Black Veil", "Red Red Rose", and "Pretty Polly".

She currently performs with Maggie McKaig, Luke Wilson, Randy McKean, Murray Campbell, and Louis B. Jones, who also appear on her album Rustler’s Moon. She has also released the album Sturdy Boots, produced by Boneyard Records.

Hall has written and performed a number of songs, including:

- Love is Gonna Win, featuring Luke Wilson, Kit Bailey
- Comin Back to Me, featuring Gerry Pineda, Maggie McKaig
- Losing You, featuring Luke Wilson, Maggie McKaig
- Will I Know You When I Know You, featuring Gerry Pineda, Murray Campbell
- Dance Boots, featuring Maggie Mckaig, Kit Bailey
- It May Be, featuring Randy McKean, Kit Bailey

== Bibliography ==
=== Books ===
- Flunk. Start.: Reclaiming My Decade Lost in Scientology (2018)
- Tools of the Writer's Craft (2005)
- Catching Heaven (2000)

=== Plays ===
- Fair Use (2001 Premiere, Foothill Theatre Company)
- Little Women, adapted from the novel by Louisa May Alcott, (1999 Premiere, Foothill Theatre Company)

=== Short fiction ===
- Silver Dagger, Green Mountains Review, Spring 2009
- Hide and Go Seek, Iowa Review, December 2008

=== Essays ===
- Snow Tahoe Quarterly Magazine, Winter 2009.
- Two Trees Tahoe Quarterly Magazine, Spring 2008.
- Making Workshops Work, Workshop in a Book, Chronicle Books, 2007.
- The Stacks, Open to All, 2007.
- Banning Juliet, Women's Literary Salon, Spring 2007.
- Dialogue Without Words, Now Write!: Fiction Writing From Today's Best Writers and Teachers, 2006.
- The Literary Life of Mary Hallock Foote, California State Library Foundation Bulletin, Winter/Spring, 2006.
- Mary Hallock Foote & Wallace Stegner, Idaho Magazine, Fall 2004.
- Foreword: Sierra Songs and Descants: Prose and Poetry of the Sierra, 2003.
- Fair Game, or Fair Use?, Art Matters, Spring, 2001.
- Abject Naturalism: Lessons from a Tough Workshop, THE WORKSHOP: Seven Decades of the Iowa Writer's Workshop, 1999.
- A Stolen Life, Wild Duck Review, 1996.
- A Tide of Metaphor, Wild Duck Review, 1995.
- The Meanders of Sands: Essays on Writer's Craft, Omnium Gatherum of the Community of Writers at Squaw Valley, annual column 1995–2004.
