= Snow Valley Peak =

Mountain in Nevada, United States

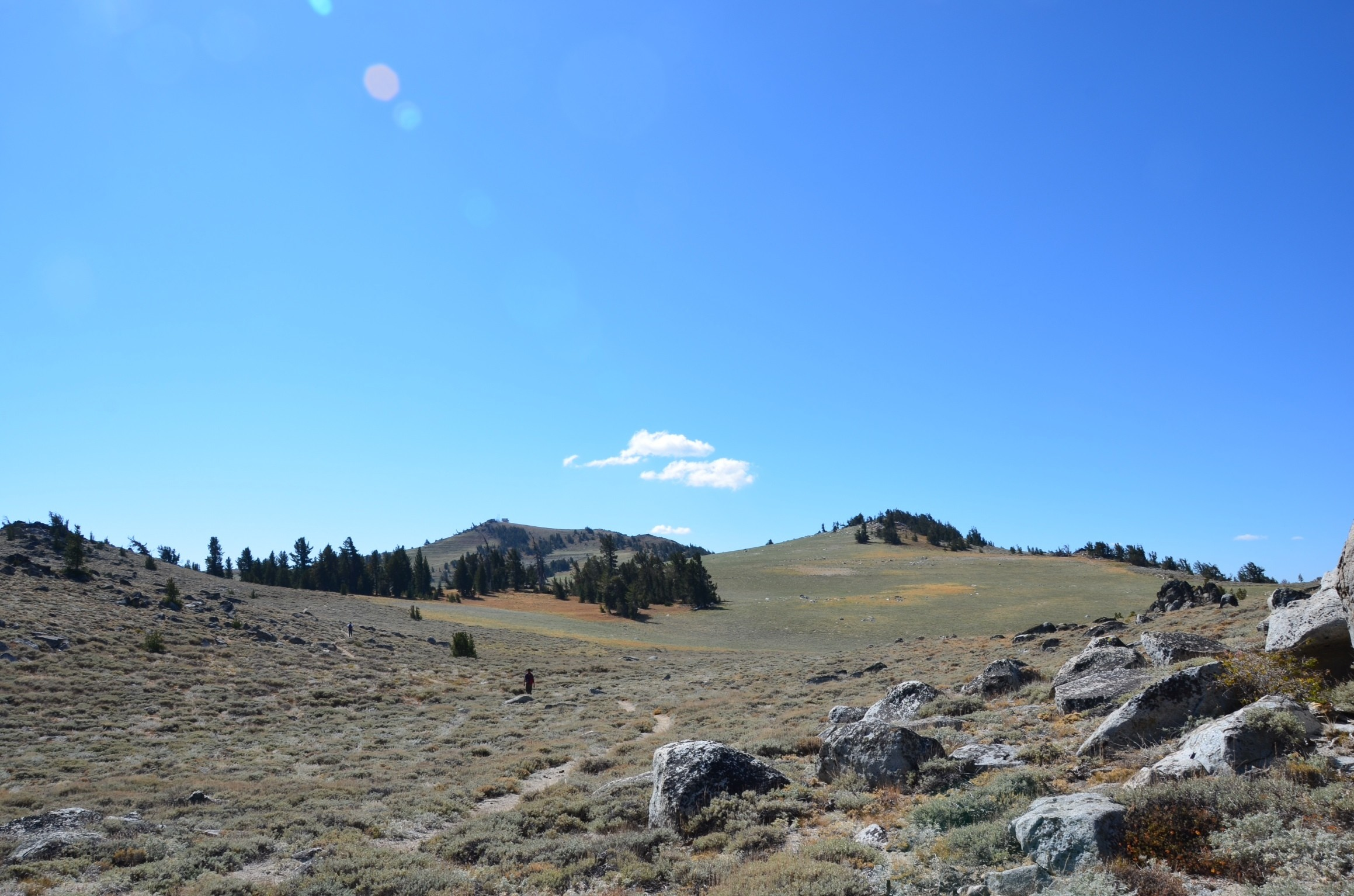

Highest point
- Elevation: 9,218 ft (2,810 m) NAVD 88
- Prominence: 1,254 ft (382 m)
- Listing: Nevada County High Points 16th
- Coordinates: 39°09′14″N 119°52′59″W

Geography
- Location within Nevada
- Location: Carson City, Nevada, U.S.
- Parent range: Carson Range
- Topo map: USGS Marlette Lake

Climbing
- Easiest route: Tahoe Rim Trail

Snow Valley Peak is a mountain located in the Carson Range of the Sierra Nevada. The mountain lies within the city limits of Carson City, NV. At 9,214 feet in elevation it is also the city's highest point. From the peak Mound House, Carson City, Lake Tahoe, Reno and Carson Valley are all clearly visible. The peak is accessible along the Tahoe Rim Trail from the Spooner Lake Trailhead. The mountain is part of the Humboldt-Toiyabe National Forest although Lake Tahoe-Nevada State Park lies immediately to the west.

The sources of three creeks begin on Snow Valley Peak: North Canyon Creek on the western flank, Clear Creek on the southern, and Ash Canyon Creek on the eastern.
