= Nevada State Route 28 =

State highway in Nevada, United States

State Route 28
- SR 28 highlighted in red

Route information
- Maintained by NDOT
- Length: 16.166 mi (26.017 km)
- Existed: 1948–present
- Tourist routes: North Shore Road; Lake Tahoe – Eastshore Drive

Major junctions
- South end: US 50 near Glenbrook
- SR 431 in Incline Village
- Northwest end: SR 28 at the California state line in Crystal Bay

Location
- Country: United States
- State: Nevada
- Counties: Douglas, Carson City, Washoe

Highway system
- Nevada State Highway System; Interstate; US; State; Pre‑1976; Scenic
← I-15	→ US 50

State Route 28 (SR 28) is a 16.3-mile (26.2 km) state highway in Douglas County, Carson City and Washoe County in western Nevada, United States, that runs along the northeastern shore of Lake Tahoe. SR 28 connects U.S. Route 50 (US 50) in Douglas County with California State Route 28 at Crystal Bay. SR 28 has been part of the Nevada scenic byway system since June 1994 and the National Scenic Byway system since September 1996.

== Route description ==
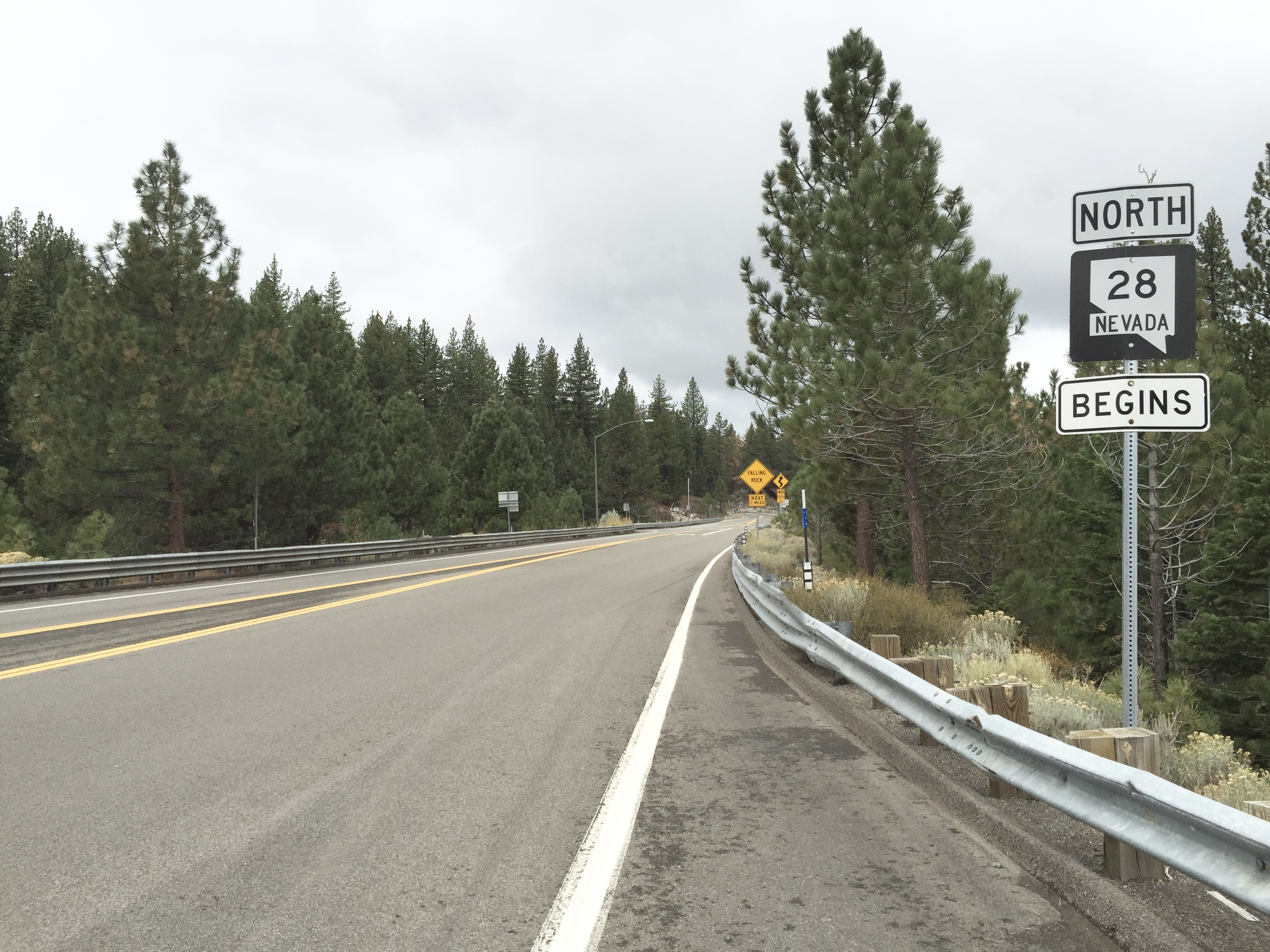
View northward from the south end of SR 28 in northwestern Douglas County, October 2015

SR 28 begins at Spooner Junction, a T intersection with US 50 (also known as the Lincoln Highway) and SR 28 on the border between the Humboldt–Toiyabe National Forest and the Lake Tahoe–Nevada State Park in northwestern Douglas County, just south of Spooner Lake.

From its southern terminus, SR 28 heads northwest, initially along the border between the national forest and the state park. After about 1 mile (1.6 km) the highway leaves Douglas County and enters Carson City (independent city) and fully enters the state park. Shortly thereafter the highway crosses over North Canyon Creek and about 1 mile (1.6 km) after entering the state park, the highway leaves the park and enters the Humboldt–Toiyabe National Forest. Assuming a northerly course, SR 28 continues through the national forest and after about another 3 miles (4.8 km), the highway leaves Carson City and enters Washoe County.

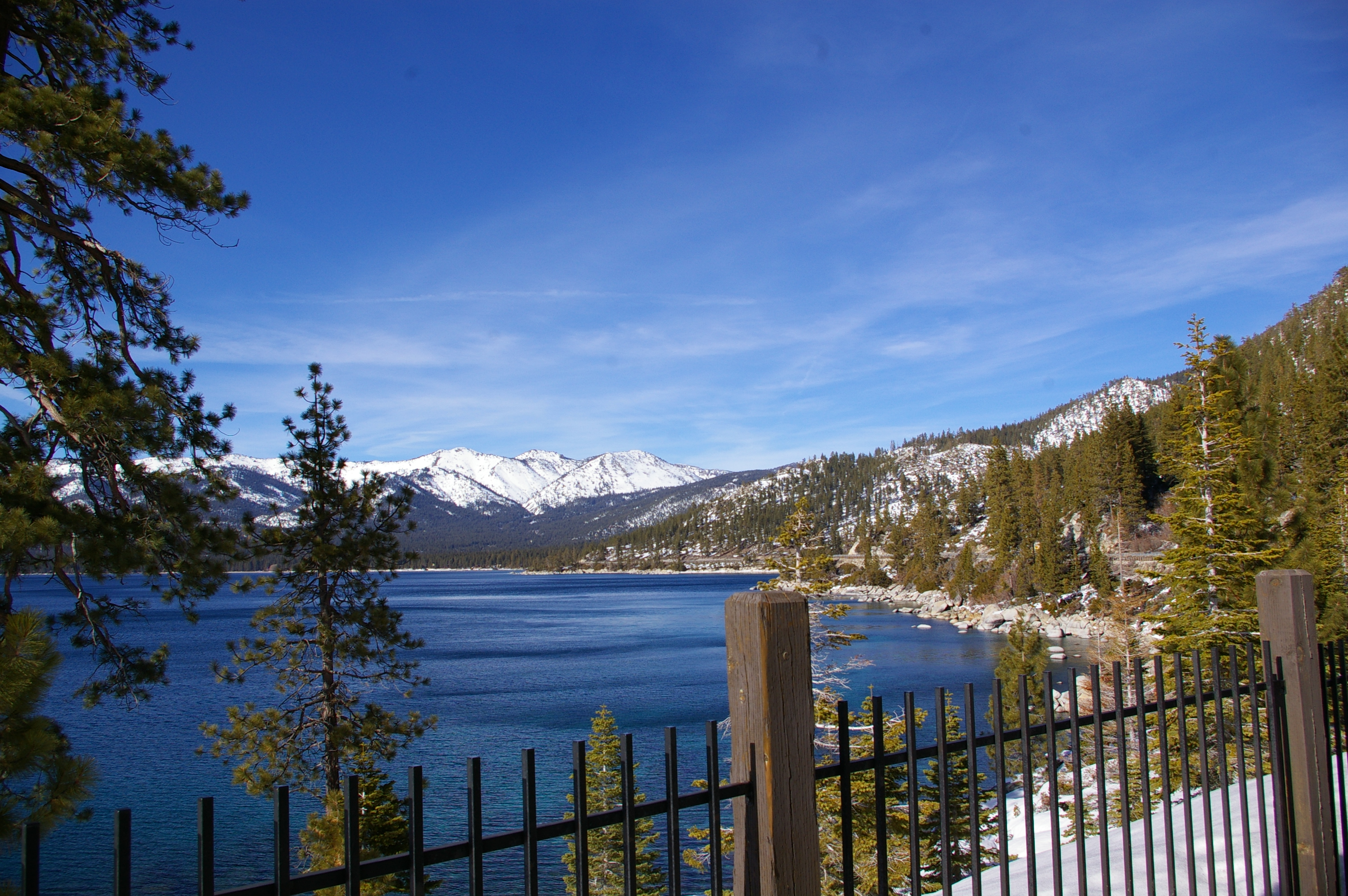
View of Lake Tahoe and Incline Village from a rest area along SR 28 in Lake Tahoe – Nevada State Park, February 2008

Just over 1 mile (1.6 km) after entering Washoe County, SR 28 begins a segment (of approximately 4 miles [6.4 km]) which runs along the east shore of Lake Tahoe. About 1/2 mile (0.80 km) along this segment, SR 28 leaves the national forest to re-enter the state park. The route then passes just east of the Sand Harbor area of the state park, site of the annual Lake Tahoe Shakespeare Festival. North of Sand Harbor, SR 28 is also known as Tahoe Boulevard. Just over 3 miles (4.8 km) after reentering the state park, the route finally leaves it, briefly passes through another short section of the national forest and enters the census-designated place of Incline Village.

Upon entering Incline Village, the route leaves the Lake Tahoe shoreline and connects with the eastern end of Lakeshore Boulevard at a T intersection (which heads west to reconnect with SR 28) and then turns to a westerly heading through the community. About 3.5 miles (5.6 km) after entering the community, near the west side of town, SR 28 connects with the southern end of Nevada State Route 431 (SR 431) at a roundabout. About 1/2 mile (0.80 km) later SR 28 reconnects with Lakeshore Boulevard. At that intersection, Tahoe Boulevard ends and SR 28 begins running along Lakeshore Boulevard. Continuing west, the highway resumes running along the shore of Lake Tahoe before it leaves Incline Village and turns south toward census-designated place of Crystal Bay.

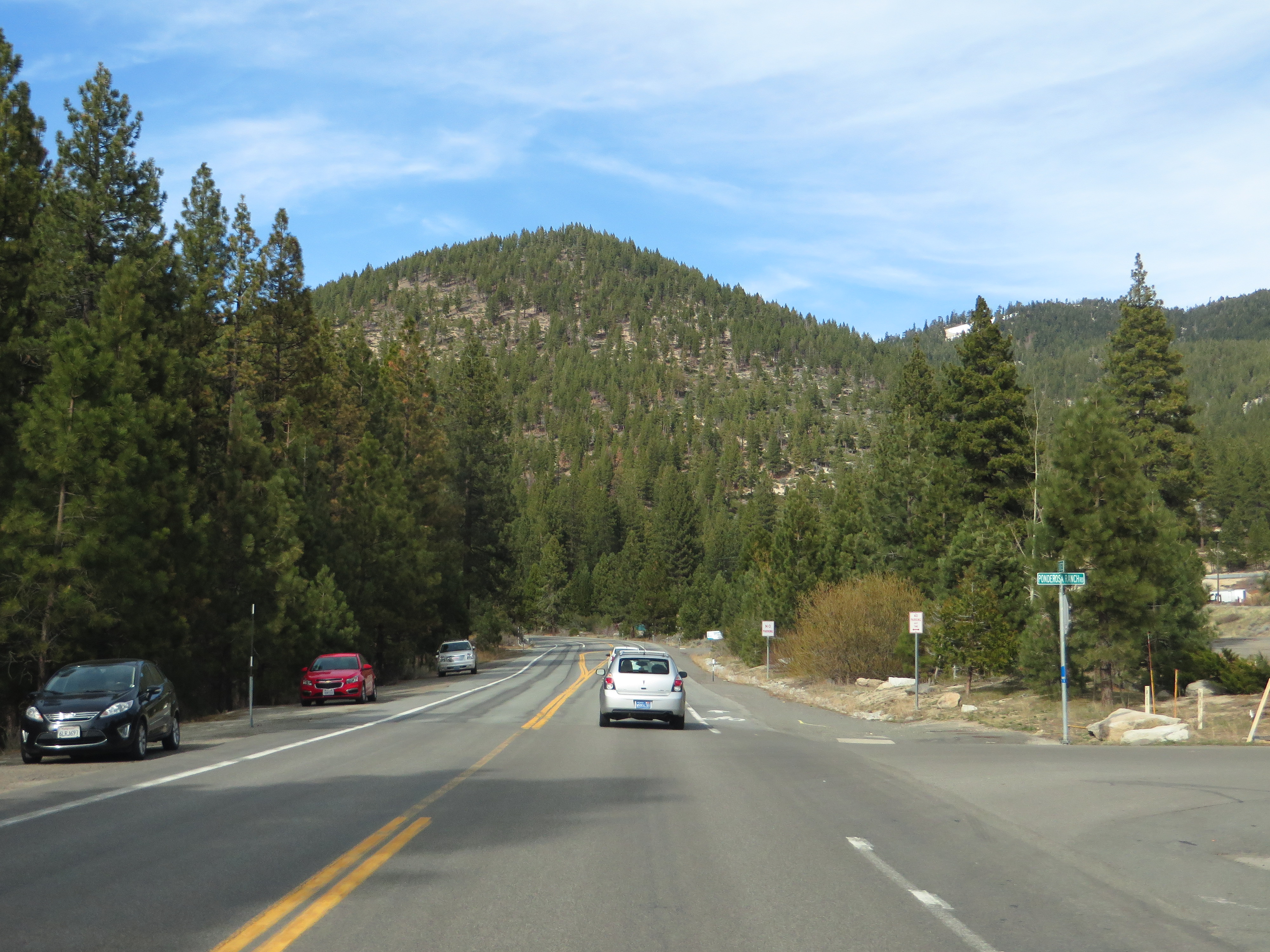
Heading west on SR 28 in eastern Incline Village, March 2015

As SR 28 heads south, it runs less than 1 mile (1.6 km) from and roughly parallel to the California state line. In southern Crystal Bay, the route turns west and promptly reaches its western terminus at the California state line and the eastern end of California State Route 28 at an intersection with Stateline Road. California State Route 28 continues west through the census-designated place and border community of Kings Beach (including the community of Brockway) and on to Tahoe Vista and Tahoe City.

At a point near the northern intersection of Lakeshore Boulevard, around 12,900 cars travel along SR 28 on average each day.

== History ==
The road that became SR 28, used for flumes in the timber industry since 1880, was paved around 1932. The route first appeared in 1948, with the same general alignment as it has today. The highway gained fame for many years as the location of the Ponderosa Ranch, filming location of the television series Bonanza that is located on the east end of Incline Village. On June 7, 1994, the Nevada Department of Transportation (NDOT) designated SR 28 as a scenic byway, named North Shore Road. Later in September 1996, SR 28 and part of US 50 was designated as Lake Tahoe - Eastshore Drive, a National Scenic Byway.

== Major intersections ==
Note: Mileposts in Nevada reset at county lines; the start and end mileposts for each county are given in the county column.

County	Location	mi	km	Destinations	Notes
Douglas; 0.00–1.23		0.000	0.000	US 50 – Carson City, South Lake Tahoe	Southern terminus
City of Carson City; 0.00–3.95				No major junctions	
Washoe; 0.00–11.09	Incline Village			Lakeshore Boulevard	
Washoe; 0.00–11.09	Incline Village			SR 431 east (Mount Rose Highway) – Reno	Roundabout; western terminus of SR 431
Washoe; 0.00–11.09	Crystal Bay	16.166	26.017	California state line	Northwestern terminus
Washoe; 0.00–11.09	Crystal Bay	16.166	26.017	SR 28 west – Tahoe City	Continuation into California
1.000 mi = 1.609 km; 1.000 km = 0.621 mi
