= Hermann Schussler =

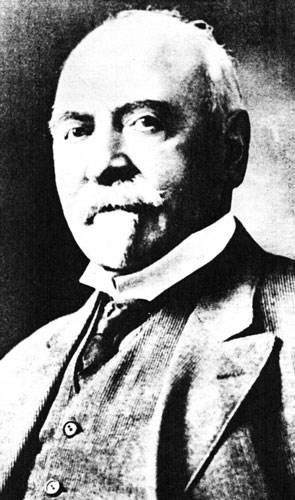
Hermann Schussler

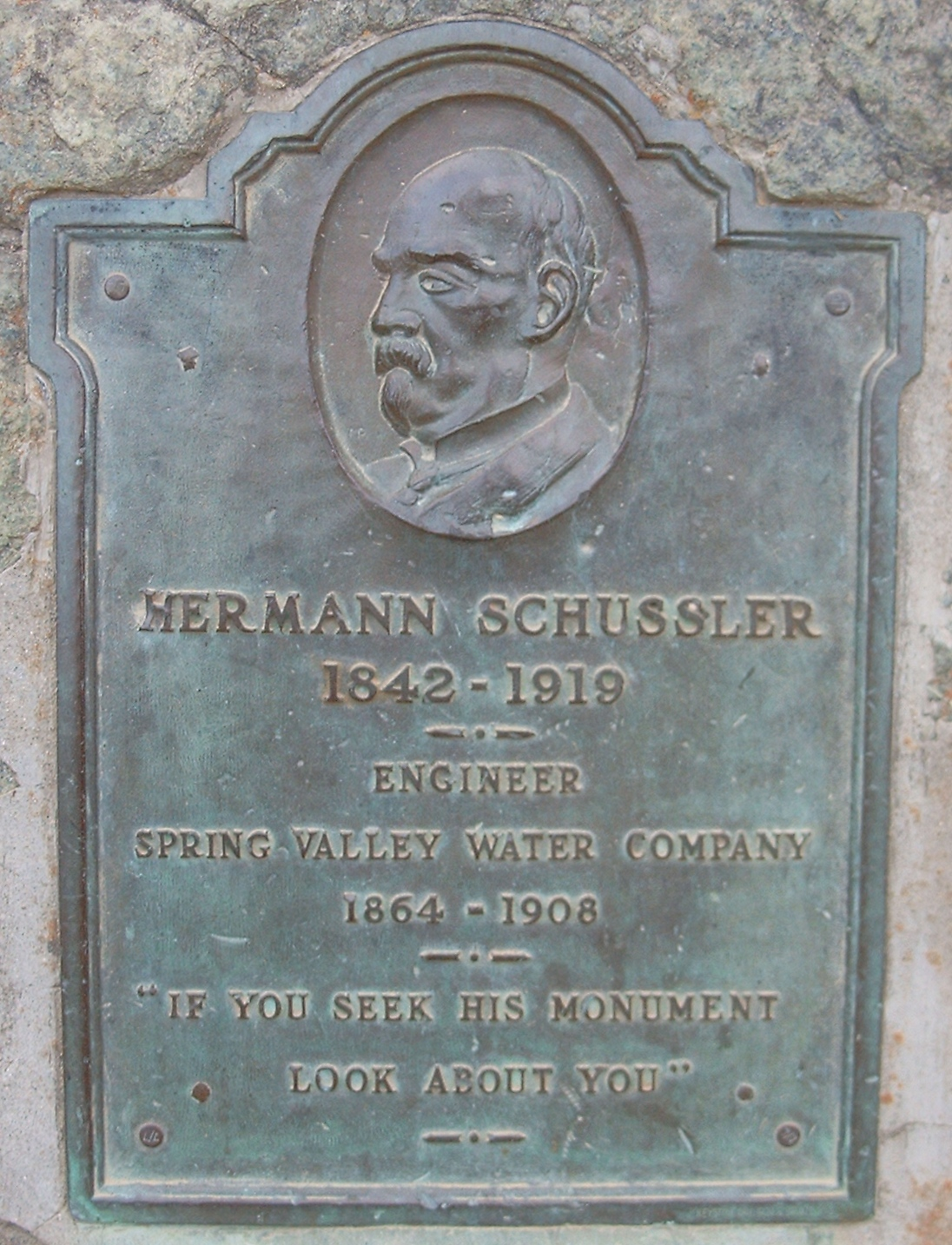
A bronze plaque to honor Hermann Schussler located at the Crystal Springs Reservoir

Hermann Schüssler or Schussler (August 4, 1842 – April 27, 1919) was a German civil engineer and designer of dams, famous for designing the Crystal Springs Dam and the Marlette Lake Water System.

== Early years ==
Hermann F.A. Schussler was born in what is today Rastede, Germany. From 1859 to 1862 he enrolled in the Prussian Military Academy of Oldenburg. After his graduation he studied civil engineering in Zürich and Karlsruhe.

== Engineer in USA ==
In 1864 Hermann Schussler immigrated to California, and started working for the Spring Valley Water Works of San Francisco. He worked on several projects in the Bay Area. Remarkable projects are the dams at Crystal Springs Reservoir and San Andreas Lake which survived the 1906 San Francisco earthquake. Schussler also was the chief engineer of Marin County, and Virginia City. In Virginia City, Schussler worked for Virginia and Gold Hill Water Company and designed the Comstock water system. He also worked on the design for the Sutro Tunnel Company and designed the water system for Tuscarora and Pioche. In 1878 Schussler worked on several water projects in Hawaii. Schussler taught engineering at the University of California, Berkeley. He retired from Spring Valley Water Company in 1914.

== External ilnks ==
- Media related to Hermann Schussler at Wikimedia Commons
