= Clear Creek (Nevada) =

Location
- Country: United States
- State: Nevada

Physical characteristics
- Source: Snow Valley Peak
  - location: Toiyabe National Forest, Carson Range
  - coordinates: 39°09′02″N 119°52′59″W
  - elevation: 8,780 ft (2,680 m)
- Mouth: Confluence with Carson River
  - location: Carson City, Nevada
  - coordinates: 39°05′47″N 119°43′57″W
  - elevation: 4,639 ft (1,414 m)
- Length: 13.5 mi (21.7 km)

Clear Creek is a 13.5 miles (21.7 km) long stream that begins at 8,780 feet (2,680 m) on the southern slopes of Snow Valley Peak (Toiyabe National Forest, Carson Range) west of Carson City. It is the only perennial tributary of the Carson River mainstem, and is protected by The Nature Conservancy. Its mouth is at its confluence with the Carson River in the southeast portion of Carson City, Nevada.

== History ==
Clear Creek Station, about 5 miles south of Carson City proper, was a famous stage station and headquarters for sheepherders. Three large sawmills were built on the banks of Clear Creek in 1862. Clear Creek Mining District was organized in 1859 and appears on Henry De Groot's Map of the Washoe Mines of 1860.

== Watershed ==
Clear Creek flows south before crossing under U.S. Route 50 (Lincoln Highway) and into Douglas County, Nevada from Carson City, then it turns east and bounces along the Carson City - Douglas County line, until its terminus in the Carson River southeast of downtown Carson City.

== See also ==
- Carson River
