= Lake Tahoe–Nevada State Park =

State park on Lake Tahoe in Nevada, United States

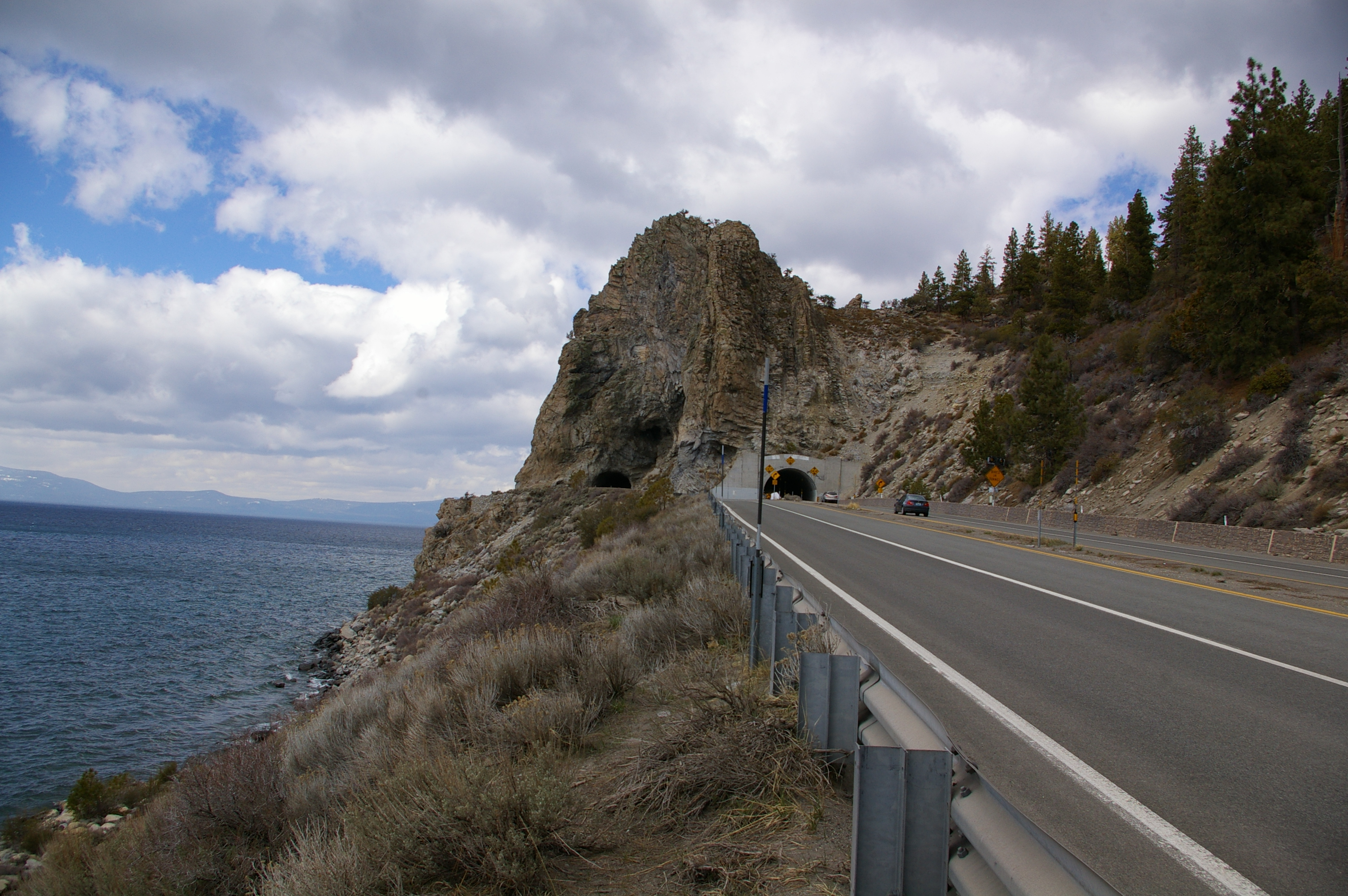
- Cave Rock

- Location within Nevada
- Location: Washoe and Douglas counties, Nevada, United States
- Nearest city: Carson City, Nevada
- Coordinates: 39°2′46″N 119°56′56″W
- Area: 14301
- Elevation: 6,227 ft (1,898 m)
- Established: 1958 (Sand Harbor)
- Administrator: Nevada Division of State Parks
- Designation: Nevada state park
- Website: Official website

Lake Tahoe–Nevada State Park is a state park comprising multiple management units and public recreation areas on the northeast shores of Lake Tahoe in the U.S. state of Nevada. The park covers approximately 14,301 acres (5,787 ha). The Marlette Lake Water System, which is listed on the National Register of Historic Places and as a National Historic Civil Engineering Landmark, lies within park boundaries.

== Park units ==
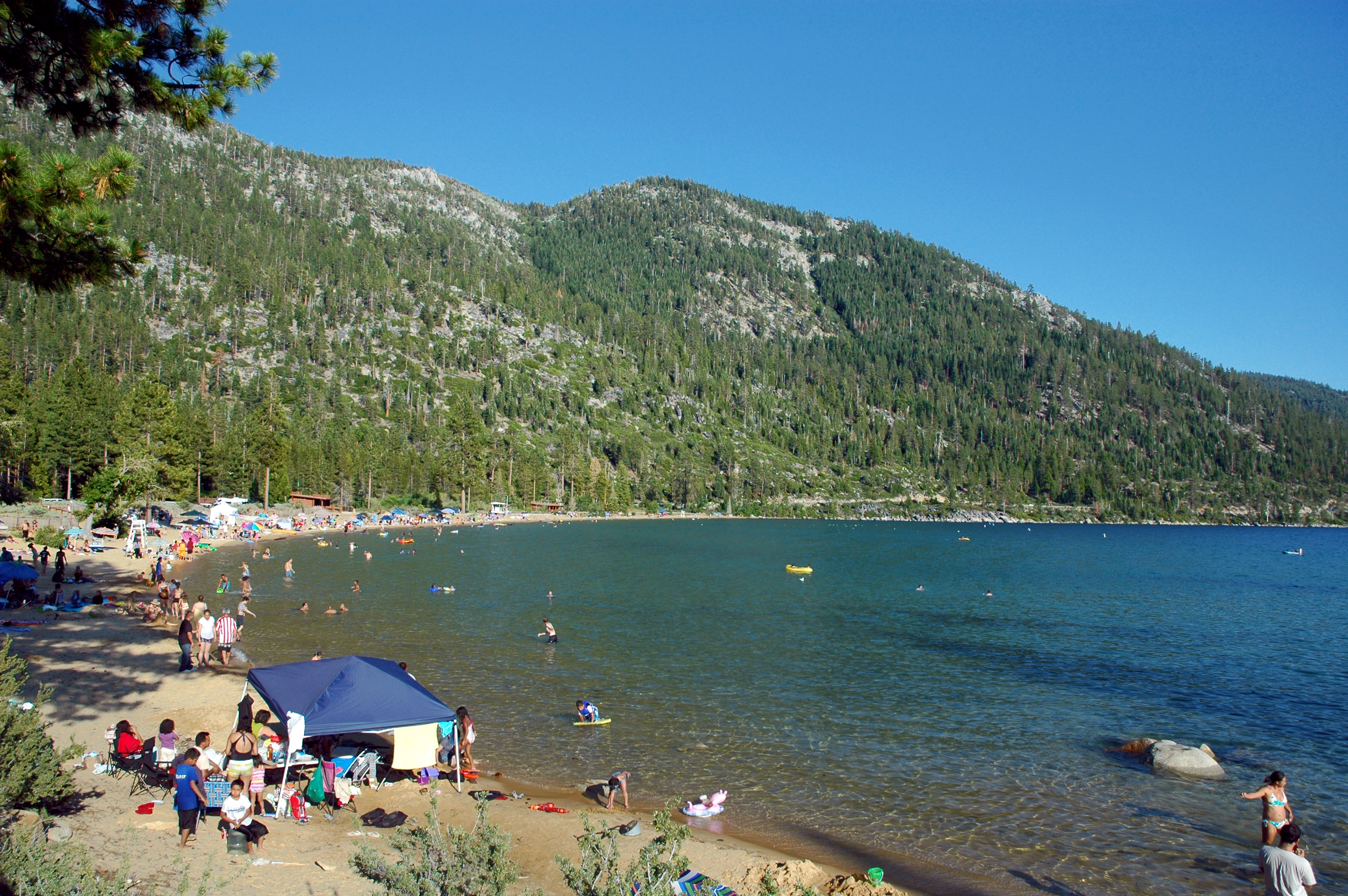
Main beach at Sand Harbor

=== Sand Harbor ===
Sand Harbor features a large sandy beach, picnicking facilities, a nature trail, a boat launch, and a visitors’ center and is the site of the Lake Tahoe Shakespeare Festival. The Sand Harbor unit covers 55 acres (22 ha).

=== Cave Rock ===
Cave Rock is a day-use area along U.S. 50 with a boat launch, picnic areas, and a sandy beach. The site, located beneath Cave Rock and the Cave Rock Tunnel, measures slightly more than three acres (1.2 ha).

=== Spooner Lake ===
Spooner Lake is located near the intersection of U.S. Route 50 and State Route 28 at "Spooner Summit." The unit's 1,140 acres (460 ha) are used for hiking, picnicking, fishing, and wildlife viewing. The site is the primary starting point for the Marlette/Hobart Backcountry trails and the main vehicle entrance to both areas. Snow Valley Peak may be reached by hiking along North Canyon Creek from Spooner Lake north almost to Marlette Lake and then east to the summit.

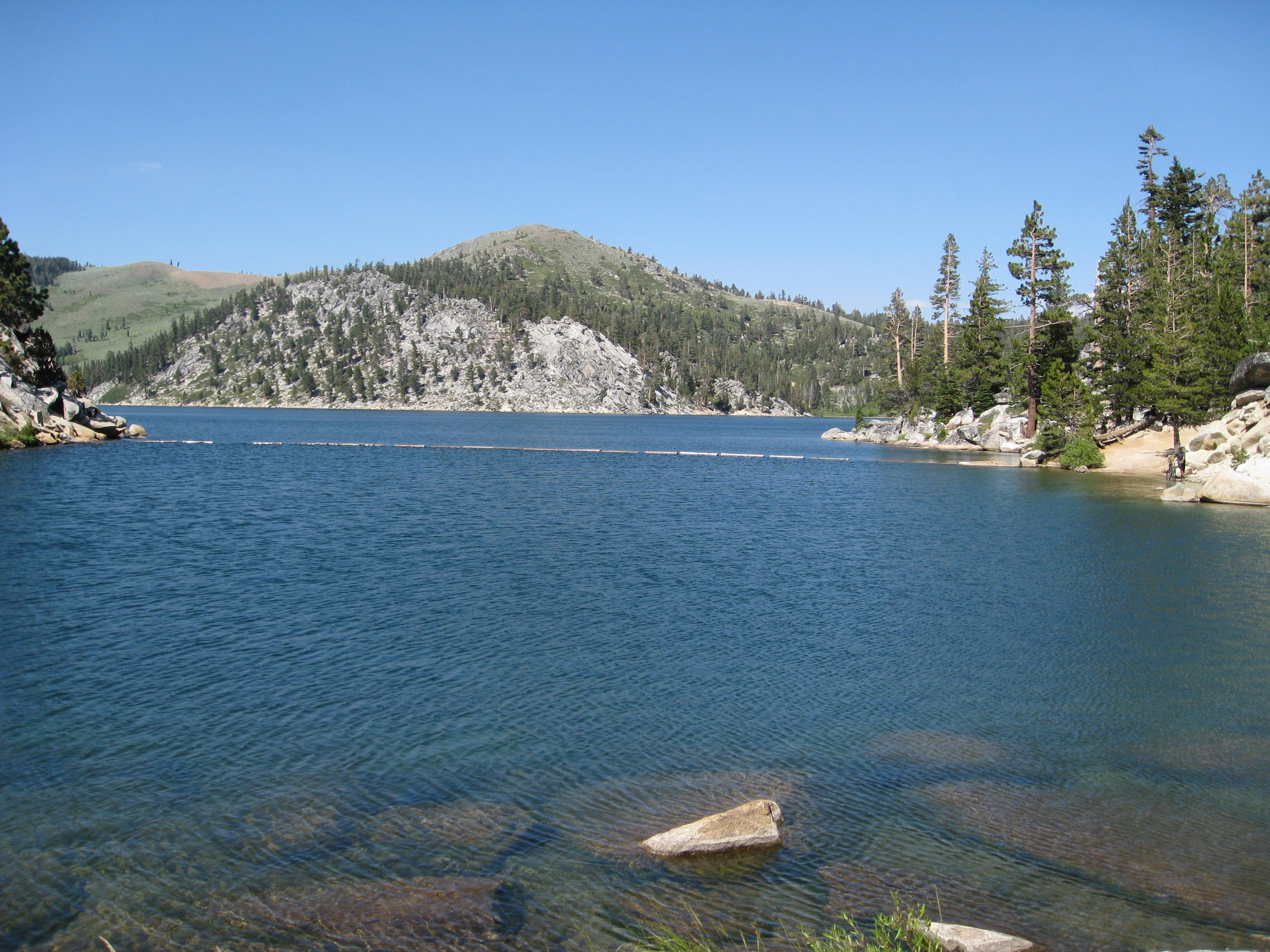
Marlette Lake

=== Marlette/Hobart backcountry ===
The Marlette/Hobart backcountry covers 12,183 acres (4,930 ha) in the Carson Range. Among the area's multiple trails are the Flume Trail, which has views of Lake Tahoe, and a portion of the Tahoe Rim Trail. The area encompasses Marlette Lake and Hobart Reservoir, which were created to feed the Marlette Lake Water System during the area's early mining and logging years. Remnants of abandoned mills can be seen. Two rustic cabins and several backpacking campsites provide overnight amenities.

=== Highway 28 corridor ===
The park areas along Nevada State Route 28 cover 40 acres (16 ha) that include Hidden Beach, a secluded sandy beach just south of Incline Village, accessible by trail or water, and Memorial Point, a roadside park that connects by trail to Sand Harbor.
