= Crystal Springs Dam =

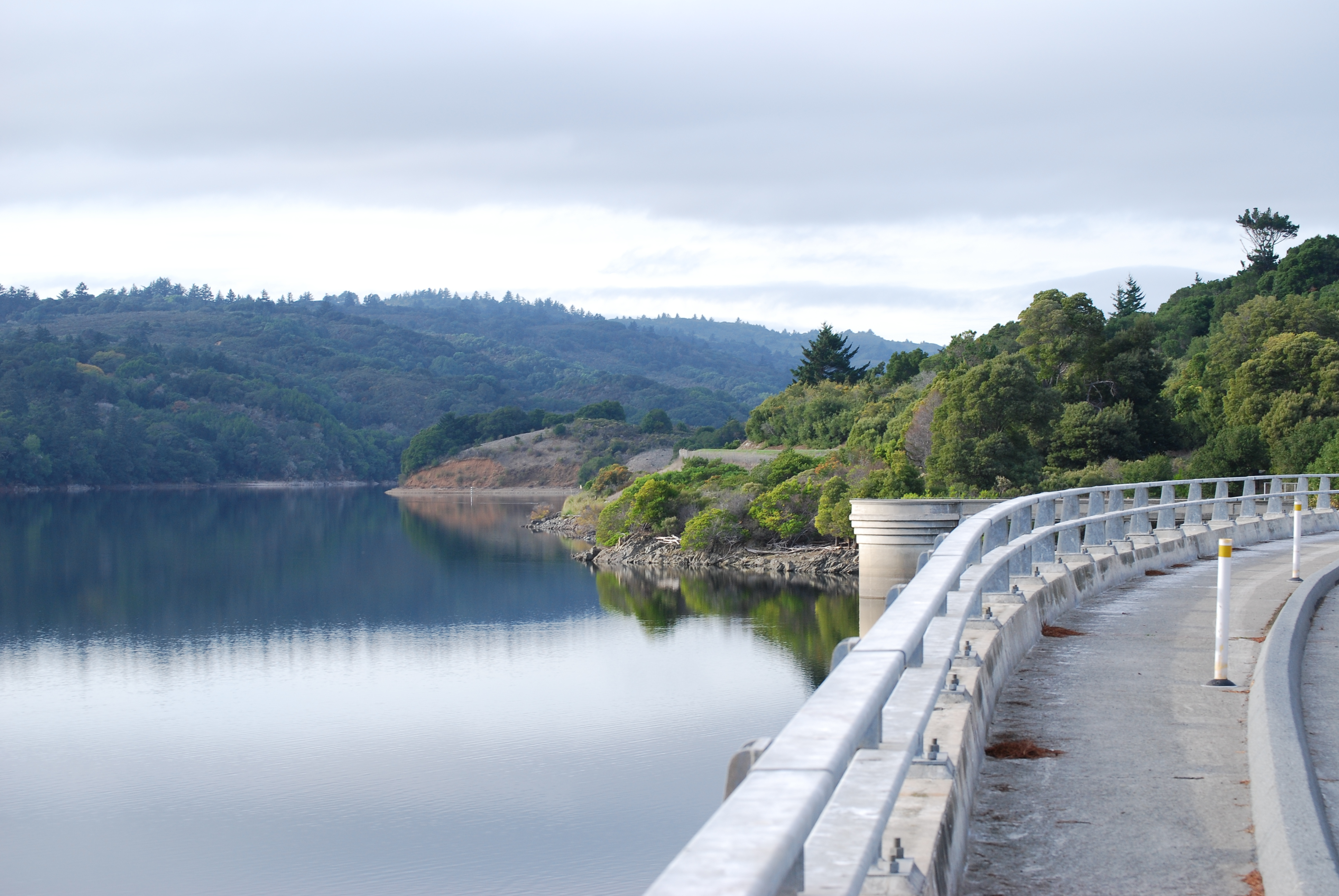
- Crystal Springs Reservoir viewed from the dam wall in 2006

- Location within San Francisco Bay Area
- Interactive map of Crystal Springs Dam
- Official name: Lower Crystal Springs Dam
- Location: San Mateo County, California, US
- Coordinates: 37°31′44″N 122°21′44″W
- Opening date: 1889; 137 years ago
- Operator: San Francisco Public Utilities Commission

Dam and spillways
- Impounds: San Mateo Creek
- Height: 145 ft (44 m)
- Length: 600 ft (180 m)
- Width (base): 40 ft (12 m)

Reservoir
- Creates: Crystal Springs Reservoir
- Total capacity: 57,910 acre⋅ft (71,430,000 m^{3})
- Catchment area: 29.4 sq mi (76 km^{2})
- Surface area: 1,323 acres (5.35 km^{2})

Crystal Springs Dam is a concrete gravity dam constructed across the San Mateo Creek in San Mateo County, California, United States. It impounds water in a rift valley created by the San Andreas Fault to form the Crystal Springs Reservoir. The dam is located about 1,100 feet (340 m) east of the fault. It is owned and operated by the San Francisco Public Utilities Commission, and stores drinking water for the City of San Francisco. The current dam is 145 feet (44 m) high with a crest length of 600 feet (180 m).

It was the first mass concrete gravity dam built in the United States. Upon its completion in 1889, it became the largest concrete structure in the world and the tallest dam in the United States. A 2024 review by American Society of Civil Engineers (ASCE) and the Institution of Civil Engineers in Great Britain indicated that it is likely the oldest mass concrete dam in the world. Construction techniques used at the dam, including washing aggregate and staggered joints, influenced the development of future gravity dams, such as Hoover Dam and Grand Coulee Dam. In December 2023, it was recognized as a National Historic Civil Engineering Landmark by the ASCE.

The dam has undergone multiple repairs and improvements throughout its lifetime, and survived both the 1906 San Francisco earthquake and the 1989 Loma Prieta earthquake with minimal damage.

== Background ==
Spring Valley Water Works, the private utilities corporation that eventually developed the Crystal Springs Dam, was formed in 1858 to provide the rapidly expanding port city of San Francisco with a reliable water source. Under the leadership of George Ensign, a prominent land baron, it quickly established a monopoly on the San Francisco water market. Understanding that any potential water source would have to come from outside of the naturally barren city limits, Ensign turned towards adjacent San Mateo County, along with its largely undeveloped mountains and streams. Over the next three decades, Spring Valley Water Works constructed a variety of conduits, dams, and tunnels to connect the San Andreas Valley watershed to San Francisco. Despite this, there was still a desire for a larger reservoir to ensure that San Francisco had a more reliable long-term water source.

Hermann Schussler, a German immigrant who moved to California in 1864 as a civil engineer, quickly rose through the ranks to become Chief Engineer of the Spring Valley Water Company. Cognizant of the growing desire for a reservoir, Schussler encouraged the company to acquire as much watershed property as possible. By the time Schussler began considering the development of a dam to impound the San Mateo Creek, the company had already acquired over 100,000 acres (40,000 ha) of prime property across the San Francisco Peninsula.

The location of the proposed dam site had its benefits and disadvantages: located in a 700 feet (210 m) valley formed by San Mateo Creek, sandstone cliff walls rose over 200 feet (61 m) from the creekbed. The dam encloses a larger valley that spreads outwards both east and west of the dam itself. Schussler's initial design created a lake approximately 9 miles (14 km) long. Geological testing was conducted using boring techniques, which showed that the valley was favorable for the dam's construction: the foundation was hard sandstone that contained no cracks or fissures.

== Construction ==
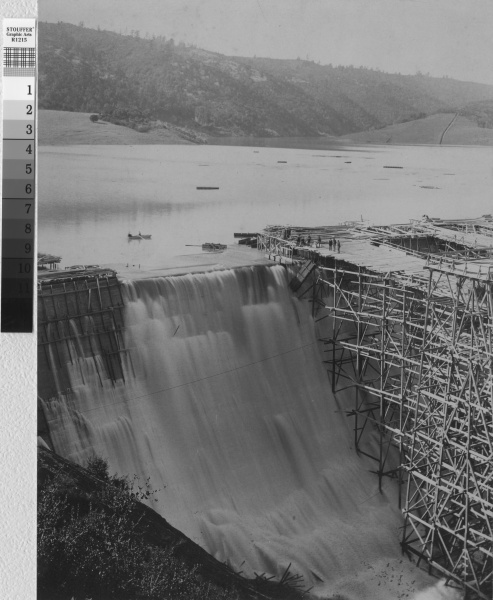
A 1890 image of the Crystal Springs Dam during construction

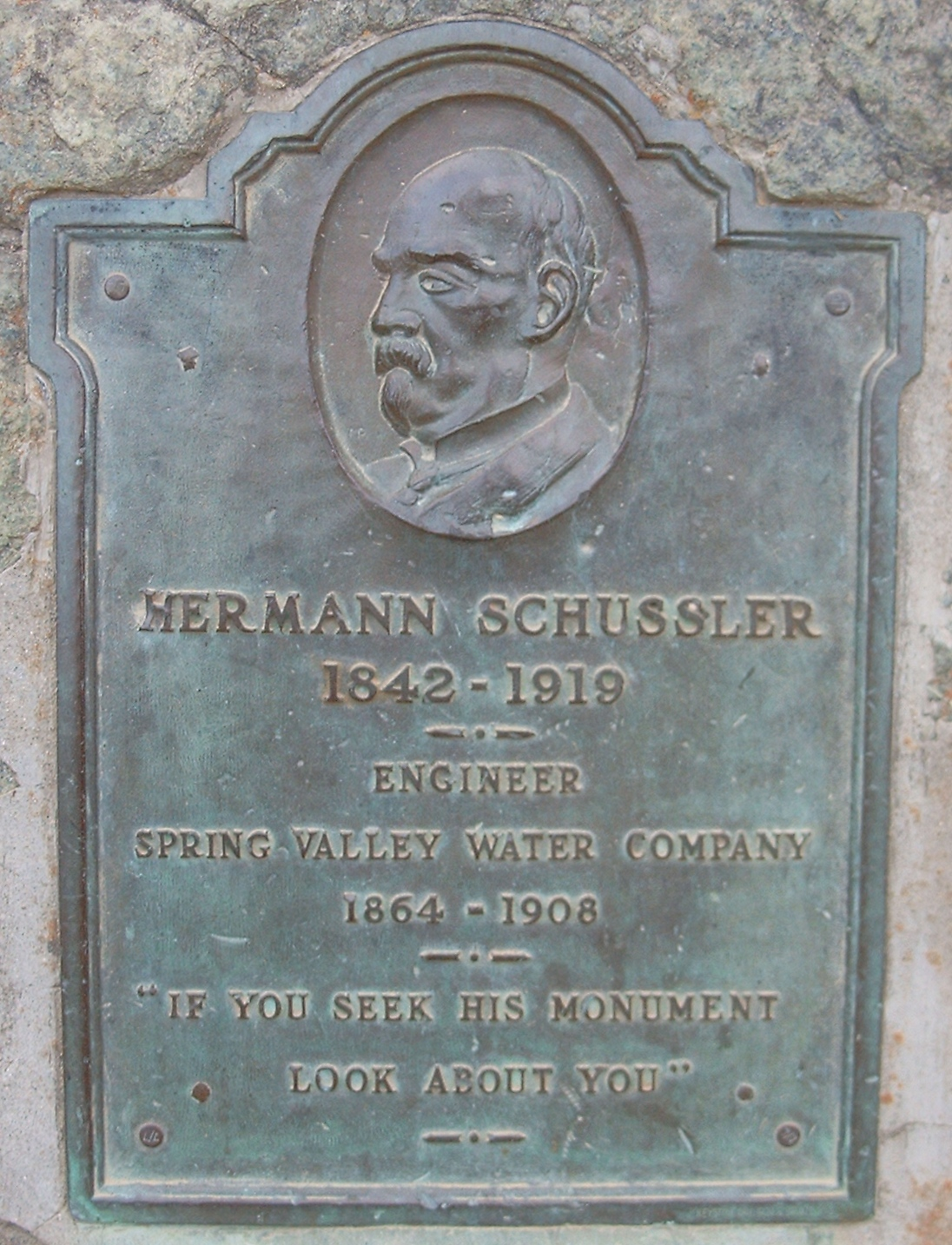
A plaque on the Crystal Springs Dam honoring Hermann Schussler

Schussler's designs called for a projected height of 140 feet (43 m). At the time there were only 17 constructed dams in the world taller than 95 feet (29 m), and all were located outside the United States. A majority of these dams were either rock-filled or earth-filled dams, however this approach would not work for Schussler's design, as there were no suitable quarries to procure materials from. During the search for quarry sites, a large outcrop of indurated sandstone was located, especially conducive for concrete. As such, Schussler switched to a design using mass concrete blocks.

At the time, the United States had no large-scale manufacturer of cement, leading to Portland cement being transported via ship to San Francisco from Swanscombe Peninsula, which at the time was one of the largest Portland cement manufacturing plant in the United Kingdom, before being sent via rail to San Mateo. Sand was brought in from North Beach in San Francisco via ship to Coyote Point Wharf, before using a team of horse-drawn wagons to bring the sand up to the canyon construction site. In total, almost a million barrels of sand were used in the construction of the dam.

The dam was constructed by separately pouring large, 7–9 feet (2.1–2.7 m) interlocking blocks of the structure in place, and allowing them to set before pouring the adjoining blocks. This enabled the blocks to set and harden individually, while also ensuring that the concrete would not crack during the curing process. An important design feature is that neither the horizontal nor the vertical joints line up. This helps the structure act as a single monolithic construction despite being made of thousands of individual blocks, while also enhancing its structural stability.

Schussler ensured that each block of the dam was poured with concrete made to the exact proportions of his mix specifications: namely, a water-to-cement ratio of 0.45 was maintained across the project.

The structure was completed in 1889 at a height of 120 feet (37 m), making it the tallest dam in the United States at the time. Initially, it was assumed that it would take approximately a decade for the reservoir to fill, however a wet winter in 1889-1890 caused the dam to overflow in just one year, leading Schussler to plan an addition to bring the total height of the dam to 145 feet (44 m). At the time of its completion, with 157,000 cubic yards (120,000 m^{3}) of concrete, it was the largest concrete structure in the world.

In 1976, the dam was designated as a California Historic Civil Engineering Landmark by the San Francisco Section of the American Society of Civil Engineers (ASCE). The dam was later designated as a National Historic Civil Engineering Landmark by ASCE in 2023.

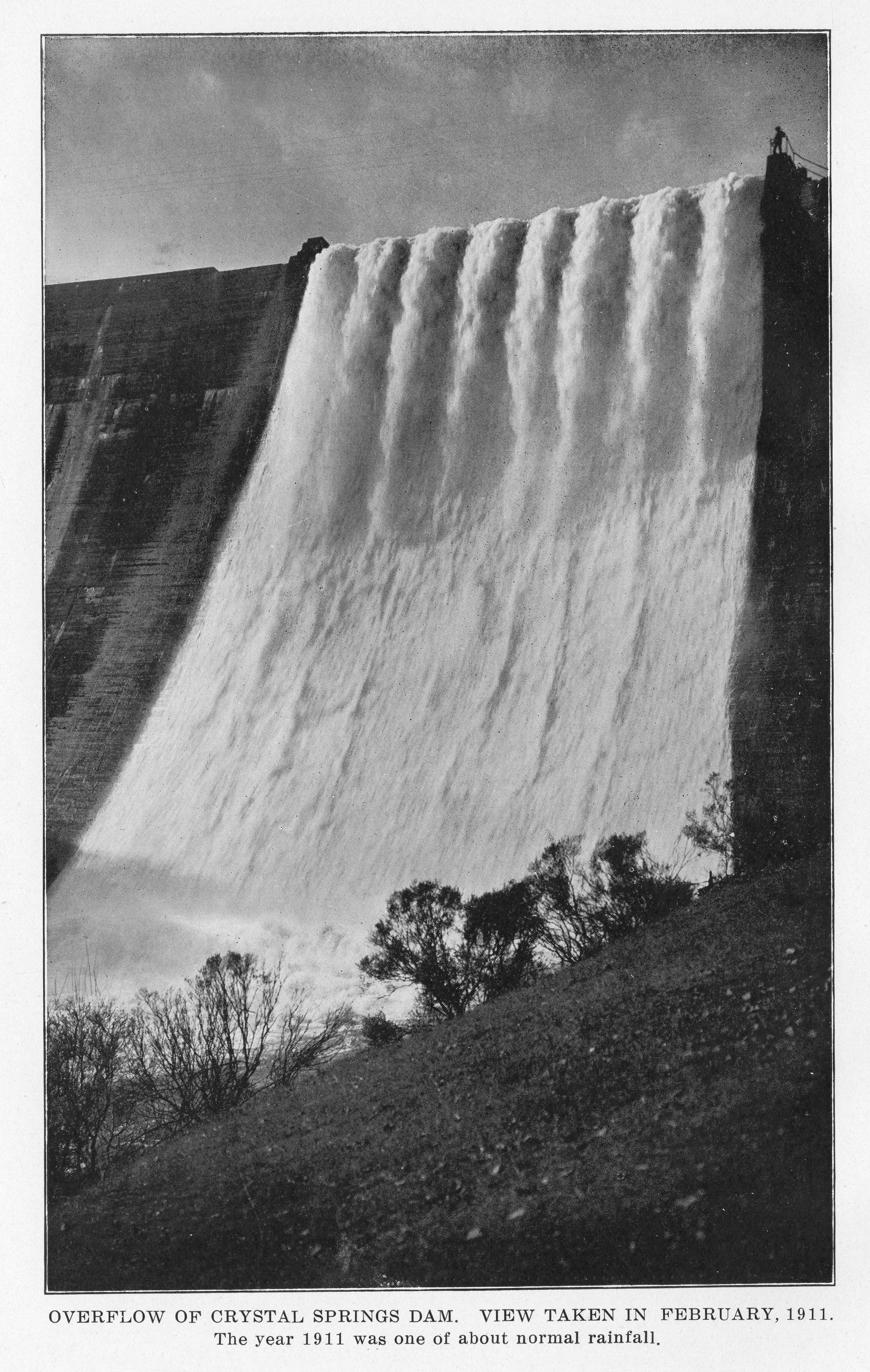
Crystal Springs Dam overflowing, in February 1911

== Operations and repairs ==
Two outlet towers were constructed near the dam, the first being built in 1891. The Crystal Springs Pump Station was built alongside the dam and gatehouse, and was designed to pump up water from the Crystal Springs Reservoir to nearby San Andreas Lake, where it could thereafter be distributed across San Francisco. The City of San Francisco purchased the Spring Valley Water Company in 1928, through a $41,000,000 bond approved by voters. The sale meant that all of Spring Valley's water rights, dams, reservoirs, and watersheds were transferred to the city, including Crystal Springs. Another public funding grant from the City of San Francisco in 1933, intended to develop and expand the Hetch Hetchy Project, led to repairs and upgrades to the pump station, enabling it to pump a maximum of 70 million gallons per day to San Andreas Reservoir. The first delivery of water from Hetch Hetchy reached the Crystal Springs Reservoir on October 28, 1934.

Before the construction of the original Crystal Springs Bypass Tunnel in 1969, Crystal Springs Dam was the penultimate destination for Hetch Hetchy water before being distributed. Currently, the dam impounds a combination of Hetch Hetchy water and water from its own catchment area.

The San Francisco Public Utilities Commission, who owns the 23,000 acre watershed of the reservoir, began renovating the dam in 2003. A major step in the renovation process, doubling the width of the main spillway and raising the dam to increase the water storage capacity, was completed in 2012. The renovations, which are intended to improve the reliability of the system in the event of an earthquake, were completed in 2016. Skyline Boulevard, the road on top of the dam, was closed for the construction of a new replacement bridge in October 2010. Along with the replacement bridge, the parapet wall was raised by nine feet, the dam's spillway was widened, and power lines were relocated to the underside of the bridge. Construction completed in late 2018 and the roadway was reopened in January 2019.

=== Earthquake and disaster risks ===
The Crystal Springs Dam survived both the 1906 San Francisco earthquake and the 1989 Loma Prieta earthquake with inconsequential damage, even as two older dams in its close vicinity, the Upper Crystal Springs Dam and the Hayward Dam, saw a considerable lateral offset from the earthquake. It is unclear if Hermann Schussler, the chief engineer of the project, was aware of the existence of the San Andreas Fault 1,100 feet (340 m) away from the dam.

The dam is within 25 miles (40 km) of three major fault lines—the San Andreas Fault, the Calaveras Fault, and the Hayward Fault. A 1982 report by the Association of Engineering Geologists concluded that the dam itself would be able to withstand a 8.5 magnitude earthquake along the San Andreas Fault, and found that the brecciated sandstone on which the dam was built on significantly contributed to its robustness. While the untreated brecciated foundation on which the dam lies would be considered substandard by today's building standards, the fractures might have had the unintended effect of absorbing the tectonic energy caused by an earthquake.

In 1983, the California Department of Water Resources (DWR) restricted the amount of water stored in Crystal Springs Reservoir to an elevation of 283 feet, or 84% of the dam's capacity, due to concerns that the dam may not be able to handle a flood event. The dam is also classified with an "Extremely High" downstream hazard rating by the DWR in the event of a breach. This classification indicates that a failure of the dam could lead to significant loss of life or result in flooding an area populated by 1,000 or more people; the DWR's flood inundation boundary for a dam breach scenario encompasses large parts of Foster City, Hillsborough, and San Mateo.

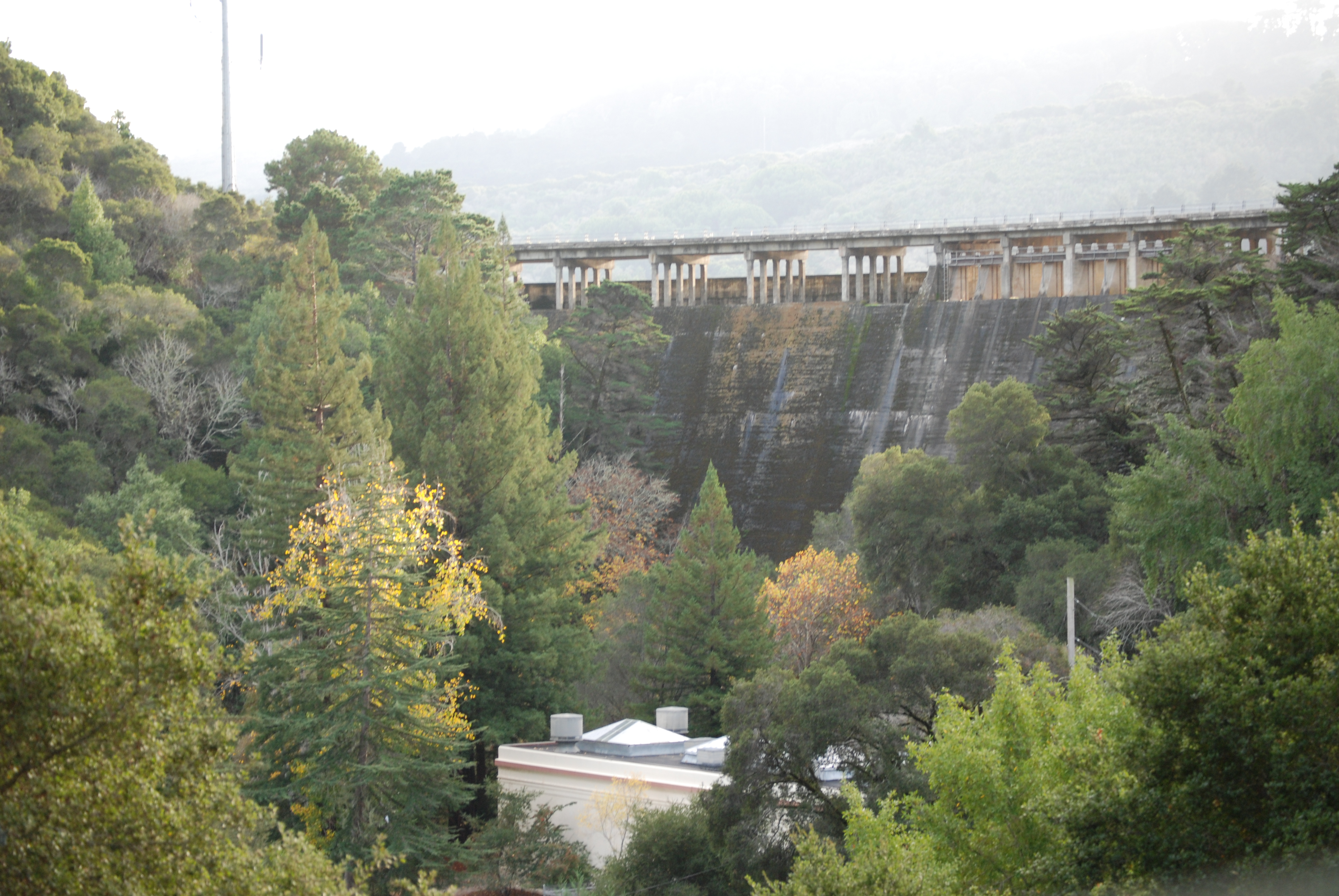
Crystal Springs Dam and Crystal Springs Pump Station, viewed from downstream

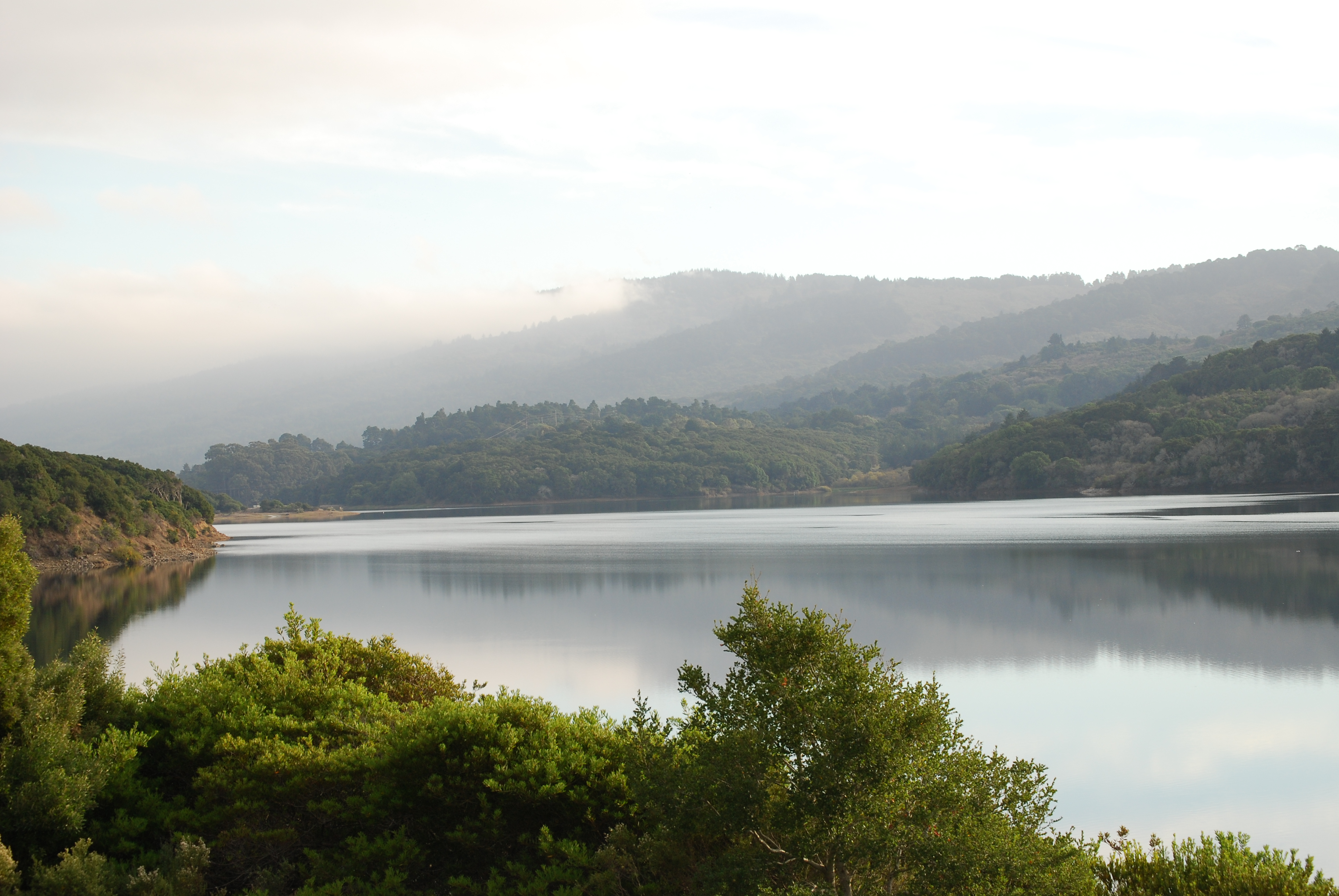
Lower Crystal Springs Reservoir, formed by Crystal Springs Dam

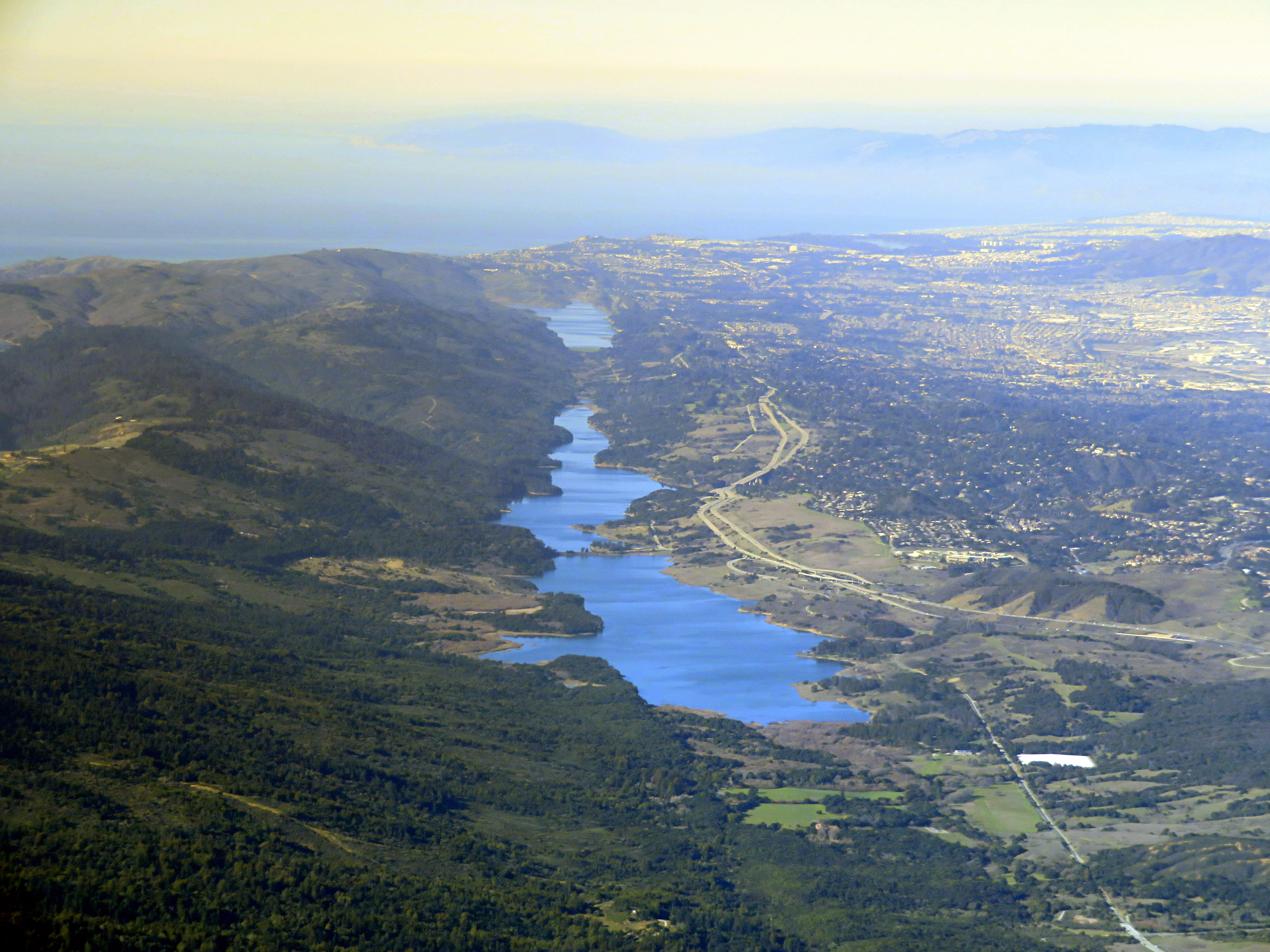
Aerial view of the Crystal Springs Reservoir from the southeast (with San Andreas Lake behind)

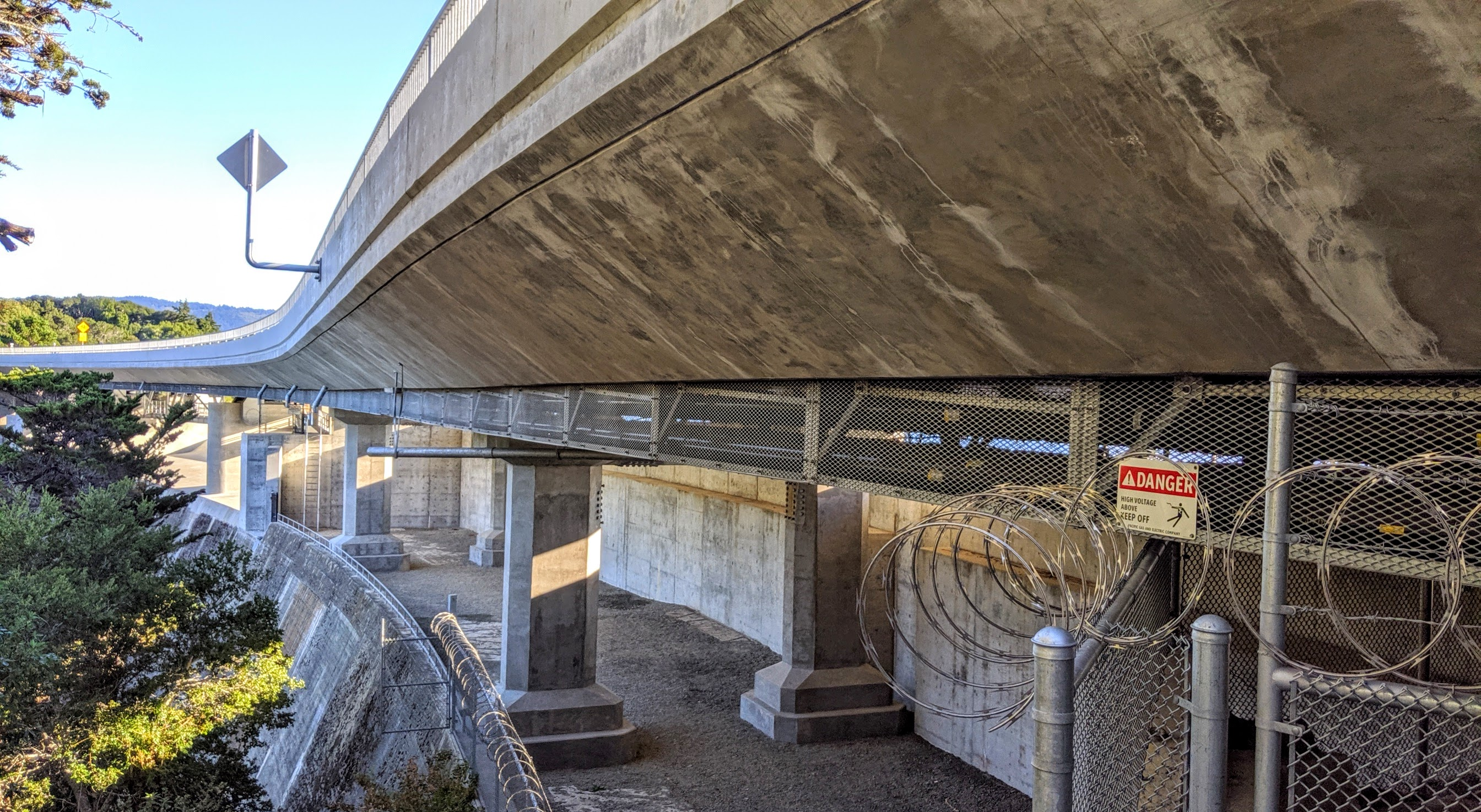
View from under the California State Route 35 roadway that was added atop the dam

== See also ==
- List of dams and reservoirs in California
