= Idaho Shakespeare Festival =

Regional repertory theatre

Coordinates: 43°33′44.46″N 116°6′52.25″W

The Idaho Shakespeare Festival is a regional repertory theatre located in Boise, Idaho, United States. Its performances are presented in the summer months, June to September. It has an arrangement to share its repertory cast with the Great Lakes Theater Festival in Cleveland, Ohio, as well as the Lake Tahoe Shakespeare Festival.

== Overview ==
The Idaho Shakespeare Festival is a regional repertory theatre located in Boise, Idaho, United States. Each year the festival performs five plays, which consist of a combination of plays by William Shakespeare as well as a selection of others, both contemporary and classical.

The Festival serves more than 105,000 individuals annually, providing professional performance, arts education, and outreach programs to diverse constituencies in the Idaho area. The Festival's outdoor amphitheater seats 770/ The Festival operates under an agreement with the Idaho Foundation for Parks and Lands and the Idaho Department of Parks and Recreation. A typical season at the outdoor amphitheatre consists of five to six mainstage productions from June through September for audiences exceeding 53,000 in the 2008 season, as well as several performances by the Festival's drama camps and apprentice program.

In addition to the plays, a free outdoor "Green Show" precedes the evening plays from June through October often set to Elizabethan music and themes. The Greenshow is essentially a showcase or mini play, based loosely on the evening's performances.

The festival also brings theater-arts programming to schools in 39 of Idaho's 44 counties. The school tours, Idaho Theater for Youth and Shakespearience, annually reach more than 52,000 K–12 schoolchildren and teachers, including those in remote and rural communities. The drama school provides classes for students of all ages, and apprenticeships and residencies are offered for extended theatrical training. Summer camps offer educational experiences for children aged 3–18. These educational initiatives, in conjunction with the Festival's mainstage productions, allow the festival to serve a variety of audiences.

Idaho Shakespeare Festival is listed as a Major Festival in the 2004 book Shakespeare Festivals Around the World

== History ==
One of the original founders, Dan Peterson, died in 2008.

== Location ==
The Idaho Shakespeare Festival Amphitheater and Habitat Reserve is located in a small natural amphitheater along the Boise River, adjacent to the Idaho Department of Parks and Recreation offices. Performances are in a state-of-the-art 770-seat facility that was built specifically to feature the human voice is nestled in a unique habitat that is home to an astonishing variety of plant and animal species. The Festival operates under an agreement with the Idaho Foundation for Parks and Lands and the Idaho Department of Parks and Recreation.

== Organization ==
The festival is governed by a volunteer 44-member board of trustees; managed by 12 permanent staff members; serves as an artistic home for 180-plus artists, technicians, and service personnel; and hosts hundreds of community volunteers each year.

== Productions ==
Due to the COVID-19 Pandemic, the 2020 season which was set to include Much Ado About Nothing, Ain't Misbehavin', Henry V, Emma, and Sleuth has been cancelled.

In 2005, they obtained a unique grant from the Idaho commission of the arts to tour a production of Dreams of a Bird Woman throughout Idaho.

== See also ==
- William Shakespeare
- Boise, Idaho
- Shakespeare festivals
