= Carson Range =

Mountain range in the United States

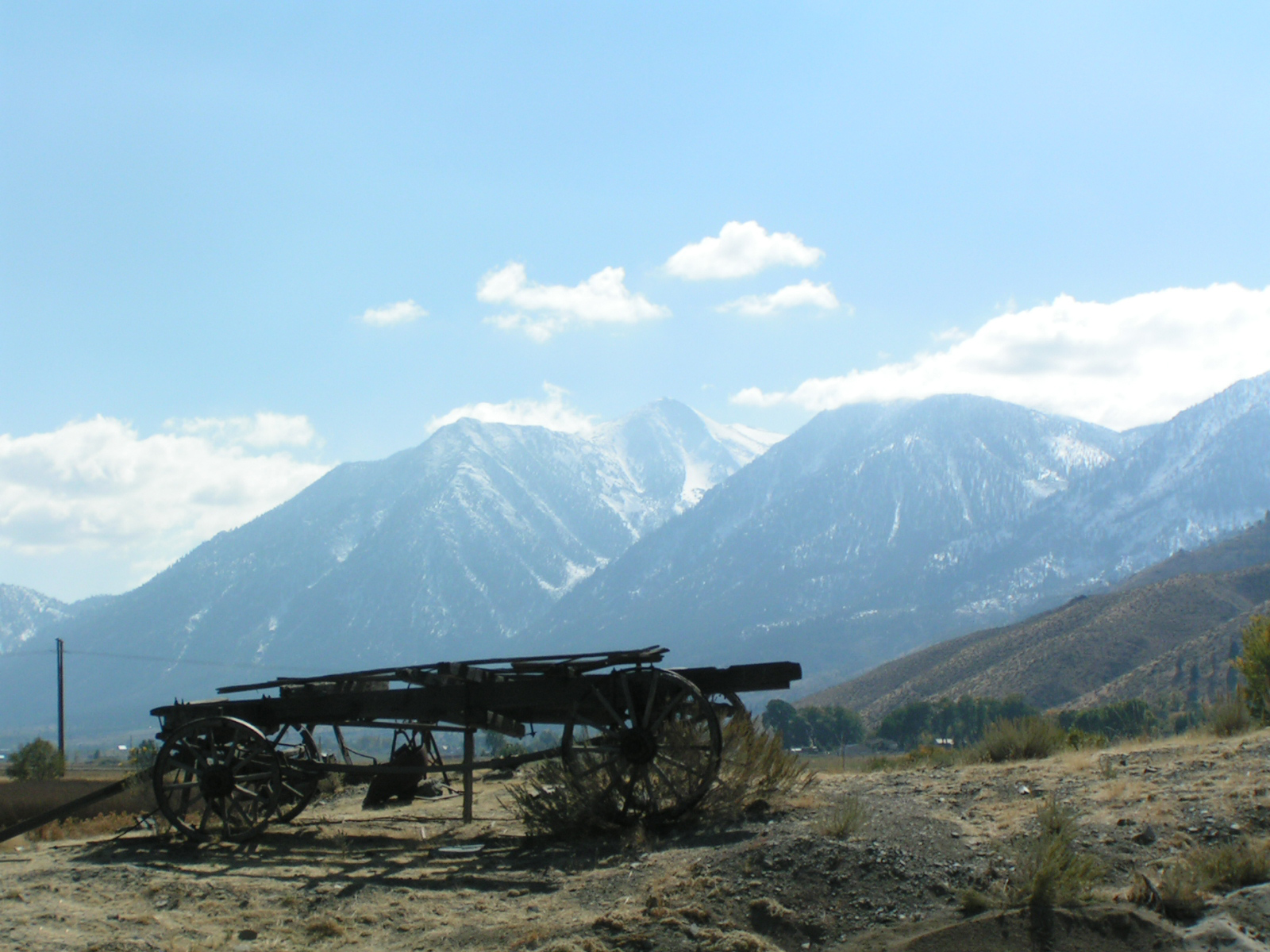
- Looking south from Genoa, Nevada, toward the Carson Range

Highest point
- Peak: Freel Peak
- Elevation: 10,881 ft (3,317 m)

Dimensions
- Length: 50 mi (80 km) N-S
- Width: 5–10 mi (8.0–16.1 km) E-W

Geography
- Location within Nevada
- Country: United States
- States: Nevada; California
- Range coordinates: 39°20′37.672″N 119°55′1.688″W
- Parent range: Sierra Nevada (U.S.)
- Borders on: Reno, Nevada; Lake Tahoe
- Topo map: USGS Mount Rose

The Carson Range is a spur of the Sierra Nevada in eastern California and western Nevada that starts at Carson Pass and stretches north to the Truckee River near Verdi, Nevada.

== Geography ==
The mountain range is about 50 miles (80 km) long and 5–10 miles (8–16 km) wide, with 3/4 of the range lying within the state of Nevada. The Carson Range, along with its parent the Sierra Nevada, together cast a rain shadow over the Greater Reno Area and Carson City.

Unlike the main crest of the Sierra Nevada to the west of Lake Tahoe, the Carson Range loses its snow much earlier (April), and gains it much later (December). In fact, it receives about half the snowfall as mountains west of the lake. Meltwater from the range feeds into the Truckee River and West Fork Carson River, as well as Lake Tahoe and Marlette Lake.

Principal Mountains

Mountain	Elevation
Freel Peak	10,881 feet (3,317 m)
Jobs Sister	10,823 feet (3,299 m)
Mount Rose	10,776 feet (3,285 m)
Jobs Peak	10,633 feet (3,241 m)
Slide Mountain	9,698 feet (2,956 m)
East Peak	9,593 feet (2,924 m)
Snow Valley Peak	9,214 feet (2,808 m)

== Transportation ==
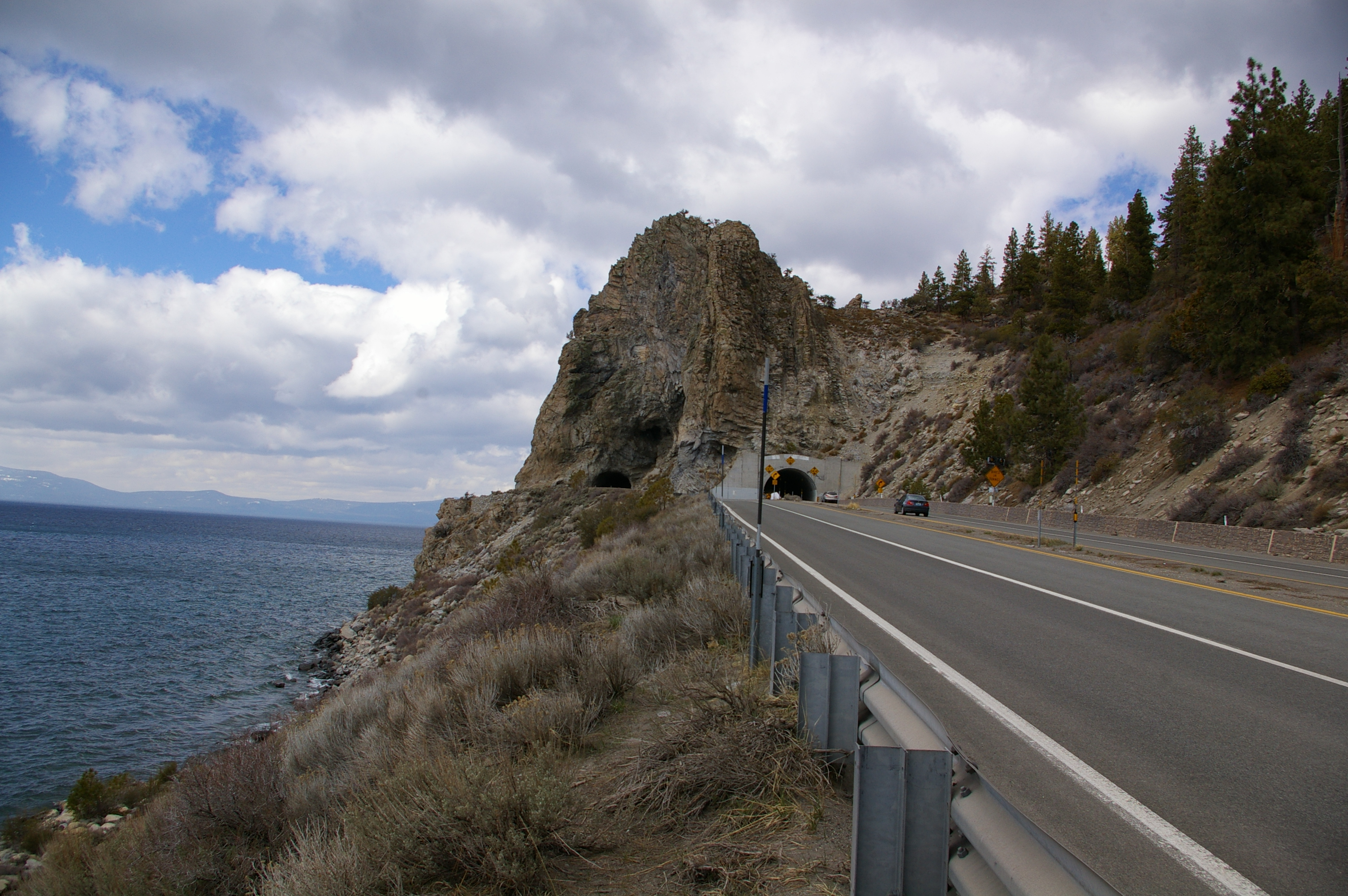
US 50 traverses the western slopes of the Carson Range.

The western slopes of the range form the eastern shoreline of Lake Tahoe, along which US 50 and NV 28 form a partial ring road around Lake Tahoe.

Travel between Lake Tahoe and Carson City is possible via US 50 over Spooner Summit, or NV 207 over Daggett Pass. Winding through the northern half of the range lies NV 431, connecting Incline Village to Reno over Mount Rose Summit.

The Tahoe Rim Trail traverses this mountain range.

== See also ==
- Carson Ranger District
