= Glenbrook, Nevada =

- Census-designated place
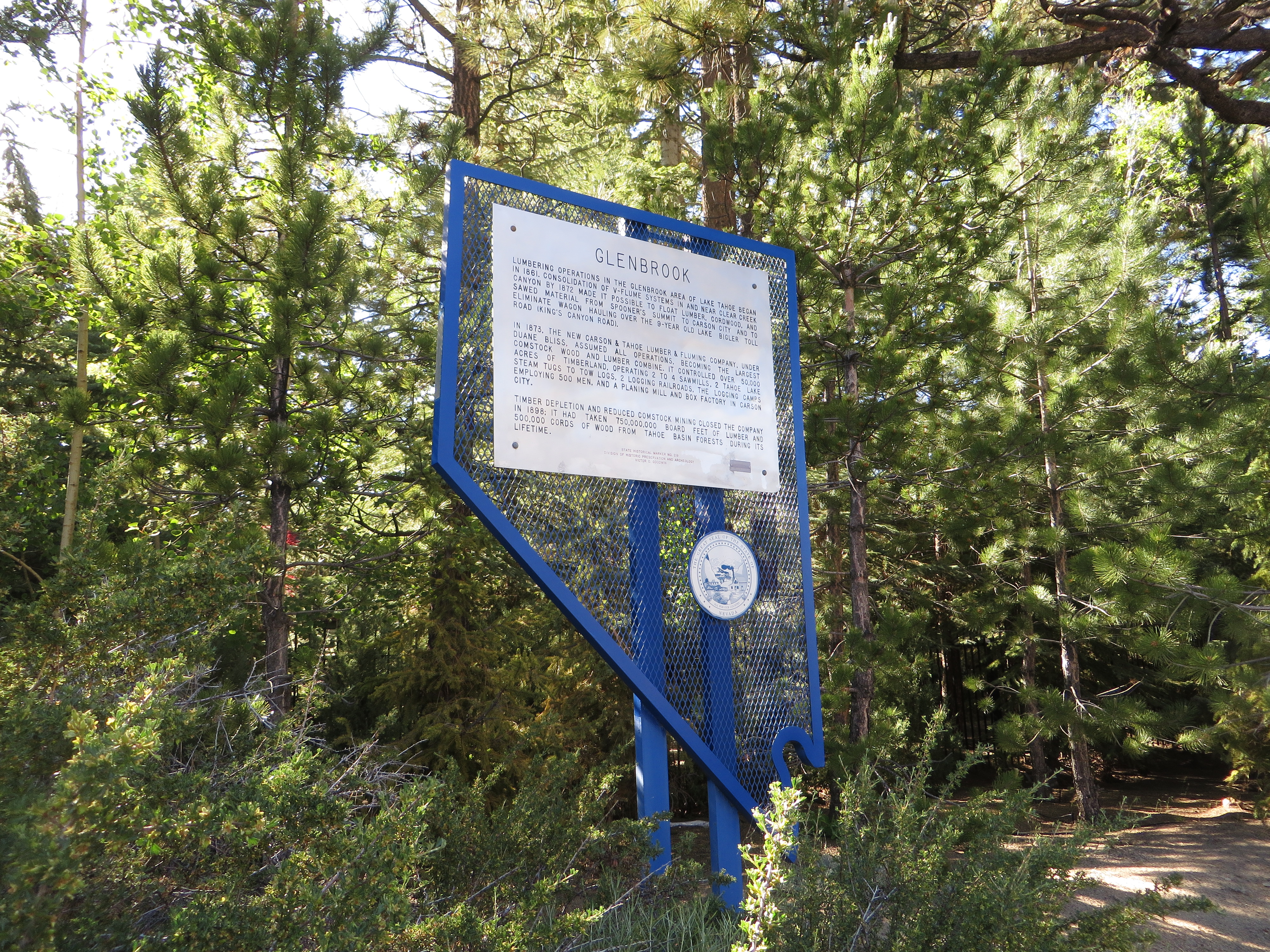

- Location of Glenbrook, Nevada
- Coordinates: 39°5′24″N 119°56′16″W
- Country: United States
- State: Nevada

Area
  - Total: 4.01 sq mi (10.38 km^{2})
  - Land: 3.79 sq mi (9.82 km^{2})
  - Water: 0.22 sq mi (0.56 km^{2})
- Elevation: 6,431 ft (1,960 m)

Population (2020)
  - Total: 315
  - Density: 83.1/sq mi (32.08/km^{2})
- Time zone: UTC-8 (Pacific (PST))
  - Summer (DST): UTC-7 (PDT)
- ZIP code: 89413
- Area code: 775
- FIPS code: 32-27900
- GNIS feature ID: 2583927

Nevada Historical Marker
- Reference no.: 219

Glenbrook is a census-designated place (CDP) on the east shore of Lake Tahoe in Douglas County, Nevada, United States. As of the 2020 census, Glenbrook had a population of 315. Beach and Bay are for residents and renters living in Glenbrook's gated community. There is no public access to the beach or bay.

The community is named after the Glenbrook House hotel and is at an elevation of 6,250 feet (1,900 m). Glenbrook is included in the Gardnerville Ranchos micropolitan statistical area.

== History ==
As the oldest settlement on Lake Tahoe, Glenbrook played a significant part of Nevada's statehood as the main supplier of timber to the Comstock Lode and Virginia City. The first settlers of the valley, which included Captain Augustus W. Pray, arrived in 1860. Pray built a sawmill in 1861. The community took its name from the former "Glenbrook House hotel", which in turn was named after two primary local geographic features — Glen, a secluded valley, and Brook, a small stream. From forested areas near the lake, logs were driven down stream or barged to Glenbrook mills. In 1875, the town had four sawmills, a store, bowling alley and billiard hall, two hotels. After 1880, logging activity was in decline and was abandoned by the end of the century.

== Geography ==
Glenbrook is located on the east shore of Lake Tahoe, due west of Carson City. This small community is about 10 mi (16 km) south of Incline Village, and about 12 mi (19 km) north of South Lake Tahoe, California. According to the United States Census Bureau, the CDP has a total area of 4.0 square miles (10.4 km^{2}), of which 3.8 square miles (9.8 km^{2}) is land and 0.23 square miles (0.6 km^{2}), or 5.43%, is water.

Four streams enter Lake Tahoe at Glenbrook. These are Glenbrook Creek, Sullivan Springs Creek, North Canyon Creek, and a diversion of Logan House Creek.

=== Climate ===
Area has a Köppen Climate Classification of Csb, which is a dry-summer subtropical climate often referred to as "Mediterranean".

Climate data for Glenbrook, Nevada, 1991–2020 normals, extremes 1909–present
Month	Jan	Feb	Mar	Apr	May	Jun	Jul	Aug	Sep	Oct	Nov	Dec	Year
Record high °F (°C)	62 (17)	68 (20)	68 (20)	76 (24)	86 (30)	95 (35)	96 (36)	95 (35)	95 (35)	82 (28)	74 (23)	63 (17)	96 (36)
Mean maximum °F (°C)	53.2 (11.8)	55.0 (12.8)	59.7 (15.4)	66.5 (19.2)	73.9 (23.3)	81.4 (27.4)	86.7 (30.4)	85.5 (29.7)	81.3 (27.4)	73.7 (23.2)	62.0 (16.7)	53.9 (12.2)	87.8 (31.0)
Mean daily maximum °F (°C)	40.6 (4.8)	41.2 (5.1)	46.4 (8.0)	51.3 (10.7)	59.3 (15.2)	69.0 (20.6)	76.6 (24.8)	76.4 (24.7)	71.0 (21.7)	59.8 (15.4)	48.3 (9.1)	40.4 (4.7)	56.7 (13.7)
Daily mean °F (°C)	32.7 (0.4)	33.1 (0.6)	37.1 (2.8)	40.6 (4.8)	48.1 (8.9)	55.5 (13.1)	63.1 (17.3)	63.2 (17.3)	58.2 (14.6)	48.6 (9.2)	39.3 (4.1)	32.7 (0.4)	46.0 (7.8)
Mean daily minimum °F (°C)	24.8 (−4.0)	25.1 (−3.8)	27.7 (−2.4)	30.0 (−1.1)	36.9 (2.7)	41.9 (5.5)	49.5 (9.7)	50.0 (10.0)	45.4 (7.4)	37.5 (3.1)	30.2 (−1.0)	24.9 (−3.9)	35.3 (1.9)
Mean minimum °F (°C)	12.4 (−10.9)	14.1 (−9.9)	16.4 (−8.7)	19.9 (−6.7)	26.6 (−3.0)	33.0 (0.6)	41.6 (5.3)	42.5 (5.8)	34.3 (1.3)	25.8 (−3.4)	17.5 (−8.1)	12.8 (−10.7)	8.3 (−13.2)
Record low °F (°C)	−4 (−20)	−10 (−23)	4 (−16)	11 (−12)	16 (−9)	22 (−6)	30 (−1)	27 (−3)	16 (−9)	9 (−13)	6 (−14)	−6 (−21)	−10 (−23)
Average precipitation inches (mm)	3.18 (81)	2.71 (69)	2.62 (67)	1.25 (32)	1.34 (34)	0.58 (15)	0.32 (8.1)	0.22 (5.6)	0.28 (7.1)	1.00 (25)	1.91 (49)	3.05 (77)	18.46 (469.8)
Average snowfall inches (cm)	19.1 (49)	10.8 (27)	7.9 (20)	3.6 (9.1)	0.6 (1.5)	0.2 (0.51)	0.0 (0.0)	0.0 (0.0)	0.1 (0.25)	0.2 (0.51)	4.3 (11)	12.0 (30)	58.8 (148.87)
Average precipitation days (≥ 0.01 in)	7.8	7.1	6.0	4.4	4.6	2.3	0.9	1.1	1.6	3.2	4.9	6.9	50.8
Average snowy days (≥ 0.1 in)	4.5	2.9	1.6	0.8	0.3	0.1	0.0	0.0	0.1	0.2	1.4	3.7	15.6
Source 1: NOAA
Source 2: National Weather Service

== Demographics ==
Historical population
Census	Pop.	Note	%±
2010	215		—
2020	315		46.5%
U.S. Decennial Census
