= Lake Tahoe Shakespeare Festival =

Theatre festival in Lake Tahoe

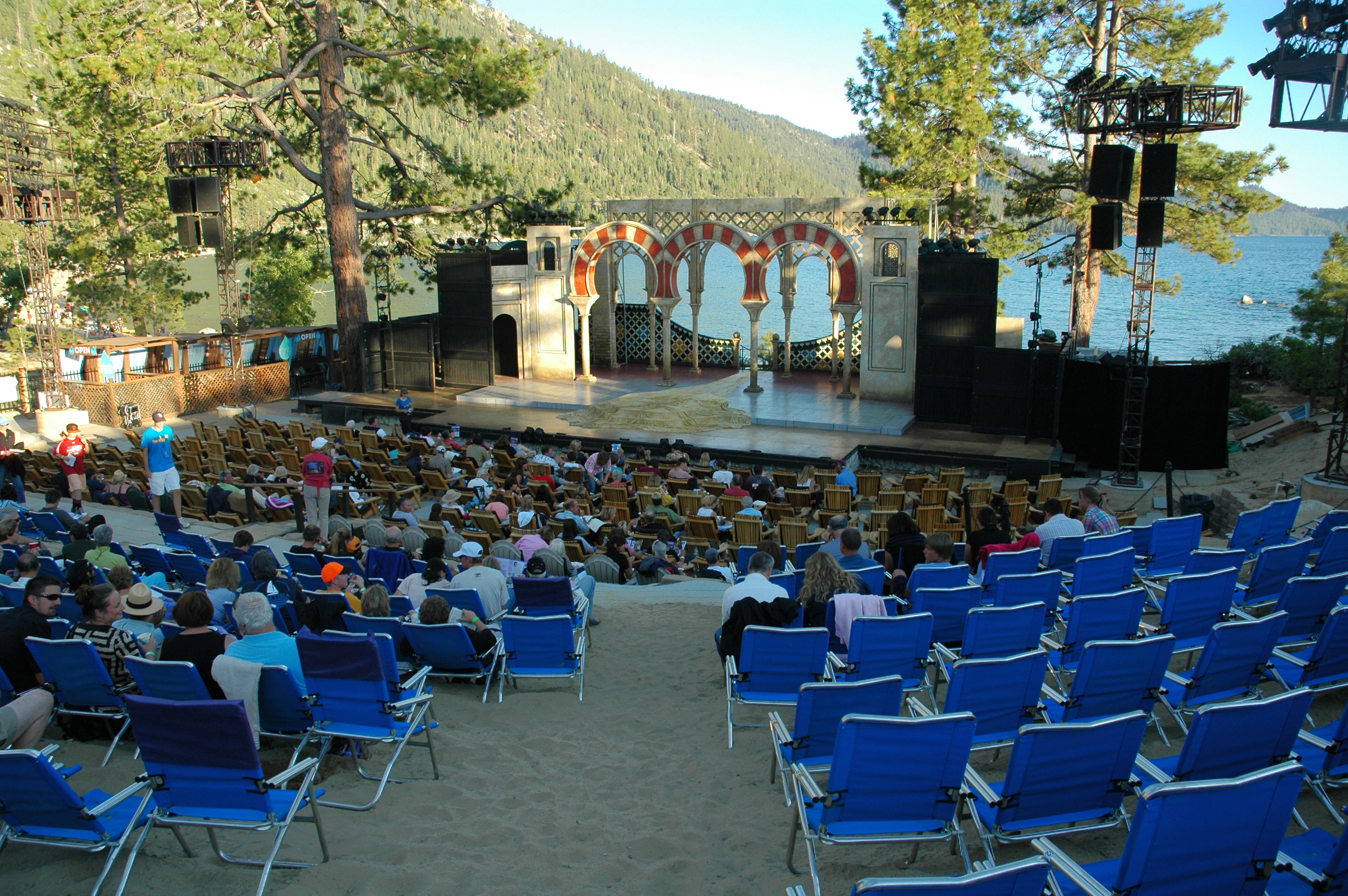
Stage for the performance of Twelfth Night in 2011

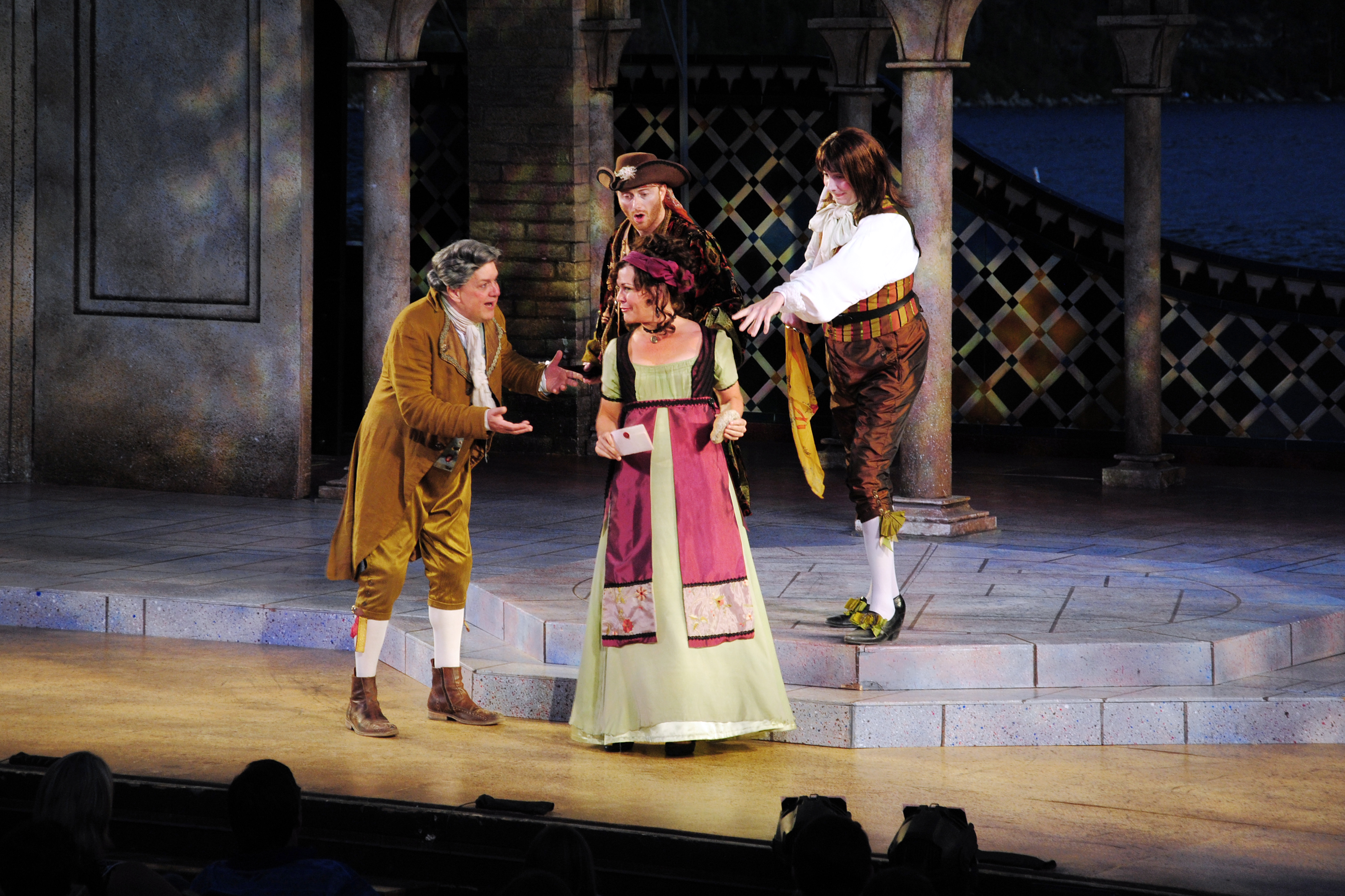
Actors perform onstage

The Lake Tahoe Shakespeare Festival (LTSF) is a not-for-profit theatre festival held each summer at Sand Harbor, a unit of Lake Tahoe–Nevada State Park in Incline Village, Nevada. It produces classical and contemporary stage productions from early July to late August and runs educational and outreach programs for students in Nevada and California.

== History ==
The festival traces its origin to 1972, when local organizers staged Shakespeare productions on the Ehrman Mansion lawn at Sugar Pine Point State Park on Lake Tahoe's west shore. Deteriorating conditions at the mansion forced a search for a new site after 1974, and the North Tahoe Fine Arts Council (NTFAC) relocated the productions to Skylandia Park in Tahoe City, California; when parking capacity there was outgrown as well, NTFAC and Nevada State Parks settled on Sand Harbor in 1978. A volunteer-built stage opened the following August with nine performances that drew large, enthusiastic crowds.

Under NTFAC, the festival became known locally as "Bard on the Beach," expanding to a 15-night August schedule by 1988 that occasionally included non-Shakespearean productions. Management passed to the Incline Village Crystal Bay Visitors Bureau in 1994, and in 1995 the festival was incorporated as its own not-for-profit organization rather than operating under another body.

A permanent home followed in 2000, when the Parasol Tahoe Community Foundation completed the Warren Edward Trepp Jr. Stage at Sand Harbor at a cost of nearly $2 million, after inviting the festival in 1999 to join its Donald W. Reynolds Not-for-Profit Center in Incline Village.

In 2010 the festival joined a producing alliance with Idaho Shakespeare Festival in Boise, Idaho, and Great Lakes Theater in Cleveland, Ohio, under which the three regional theatres share a management team and production staff. In May 2026 the three theatres announced a five-year partnership with Play On Shakespeare, a nonprofit that commissions modern verse translations of Shakespeare's plays, beginning with a new translation of The Winter's Tale; the collaboration is planned to include four full productions across five seasons and a new translation of Hamlet, with at least one production touring to all three theatres.

== Educational outreach program ==
The festival's "D.G. Menchetti Young Shakespeare Programs" are named for founding board member Geno Menchetti and reach more than 8,500 young people annually in the Tahoe region. In summer, "Young Shakespeare" presents an interactive adaptation of a Shakespeare play for children at Sand Harbor and other venues around Lake Tahoe; during the school year, the festival provides an in-school residency, InterACT, to schools throughout the region.

== Other performances ==
On select evenings each summer, the festival's Showcase Series presents live music and dance separate from its Shakespeare productions; the 2026 season included the Reno Philharmonic Orchestra, the Reno Jazz Orchestra and the Sierra Nevada Ballet.
