= Marlette Lake Water System =

- U.S. National Register of Historic Places
- U.S. Historic district
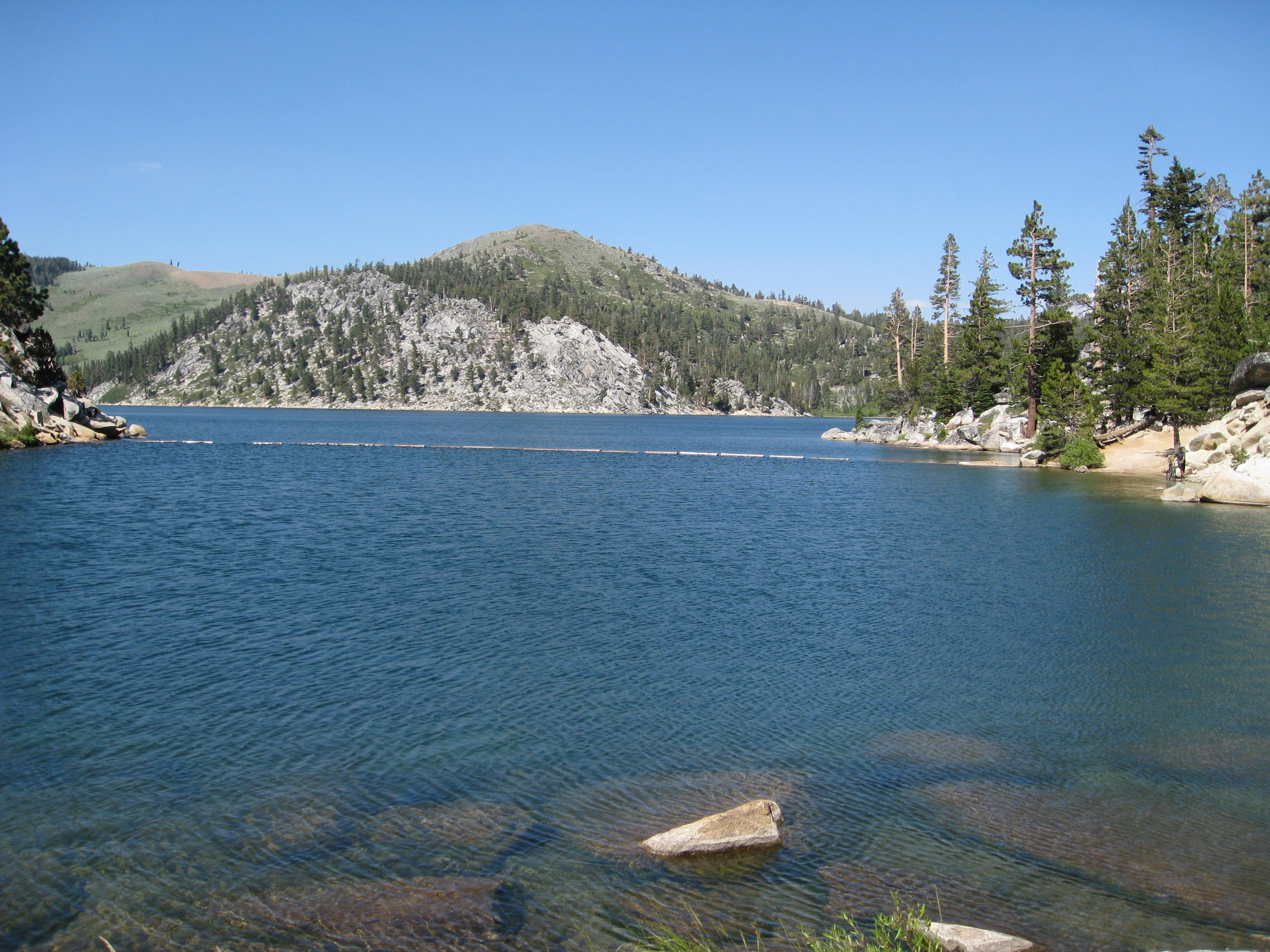
- Marlette Lake above Lake Tahoe.

- Location within Nevada Location within the United States
- Location: From Marlette Lake to Virginia City, Nevada
- Nearest city: Virginia City, Nevada
- Area: 135 acres (55 ha)
- Built: 1873
- Engineer: Hermann Schussler, civil engineer
- NRHP reference No.: 92001162
- Added to NRHP: September 16, 1992

The Marlette Lake Water System was created to provide water for the silver mining boom in Virginia City, Nevada. These structures are now listed as a National Historic Civil Engineering Landmark by the American Society of Civil Engineers, and are also listed on the National Register of Historic Places. The listed area included two contributing buildings and 12 contributing structures on 135.4 acres (54.8 ha). It has also been known historically as the Virginia and Gold Hill Water Company Water System.

The mines required large amounts of water and timber to supply the houses and mines in Virginia City and Gold Hill. To feed these mines, the dam at Carson Tahoe Lumber and Fluming Company's Marlette Lake was increased, and Hobart Reservoir was created, and a number of flumes and pipelines were built to transport water down to Virginia City. This included a 3,994-foot-long tunnel through the watershed basin divide, and an ingenious inverted siphon pipe to get water through Washoe Valley. The Virginia and Gold Hill Water Company Marlette flume location is now a trail for mountain biking and hiking.

The collection portion of the water system is now located inside Lake Tahoe-Nevada State Park.

== History ==
Civil engineer Hermann Schussler was hired in 1871 as a consultant by the Virginia and Gold Hill Water Company to design a pipeline to carry water from the east slope of the Carson Range to a ridge above the town of Gold Hill, approximately 7 miles. The maximum head at the low point of the siphon was approximately 1,870 feet, or 810 psi. This pressure, which was the highest head pipeline in the world when the project was completed in 1873, was double the next highest head pipeline, the Cherokee Mining Company inverted siphon in California.

Virginia City was the biggest high-grade silver and gold ore producer of the United States in the mid-1800s. Natural springs supplied water to the camps at the beginning of the mining activities. For addressing the need for more water because of the population growth, the Virginia and Gold Hill Water Company was established. Water was primarily drawn from tunnels that had been driven into the mountains by prospectors. The water was stored in wooden tanks, and later was sent to the towns through pipes. As demand for the water increased, additional sources of water were needed. The Virginia and Gold Hill Water Company determined that they needed to bring water from the eastern Sierra Nevada and hired Hermann Schussler design a system. The 7 miles of pipeline were constructed in 6 weeks, a significant accomplishment in a time before powered construction equipment.

== Description ==
The ultimate Marlette Lake Water System, completed in 1887, involved a pipeline that was 21.5 miles long. It also involved a 45.7 mile long flume, an inclined tunnel 3,994 feet long, and storage reservoir with a capacity of over 6,200 acre feet. This water system could deliver around 6 million gallons of water per day (GPD). The initial stage of the project included the construction of a diversion dam on Hobart Creek, a wooden flume from the dam to an inlet tank which was 4.6 miles long, and the 7 miles of twelve-inch riveted wrought iron pipeline, the inverted siphon. Another flume from the Hobart Diversion Reservoir and a second inverted siphon were completed in 1875 by the water company. An incline tunnel through the Sierra was completed in 1877 by the company. The tunnel was 4,000 feet long.

== See also ==
- List of Historic Civil Engineering Landmarks
