= Tahoe Rim Trail =

Hiking trail in California and Nevada

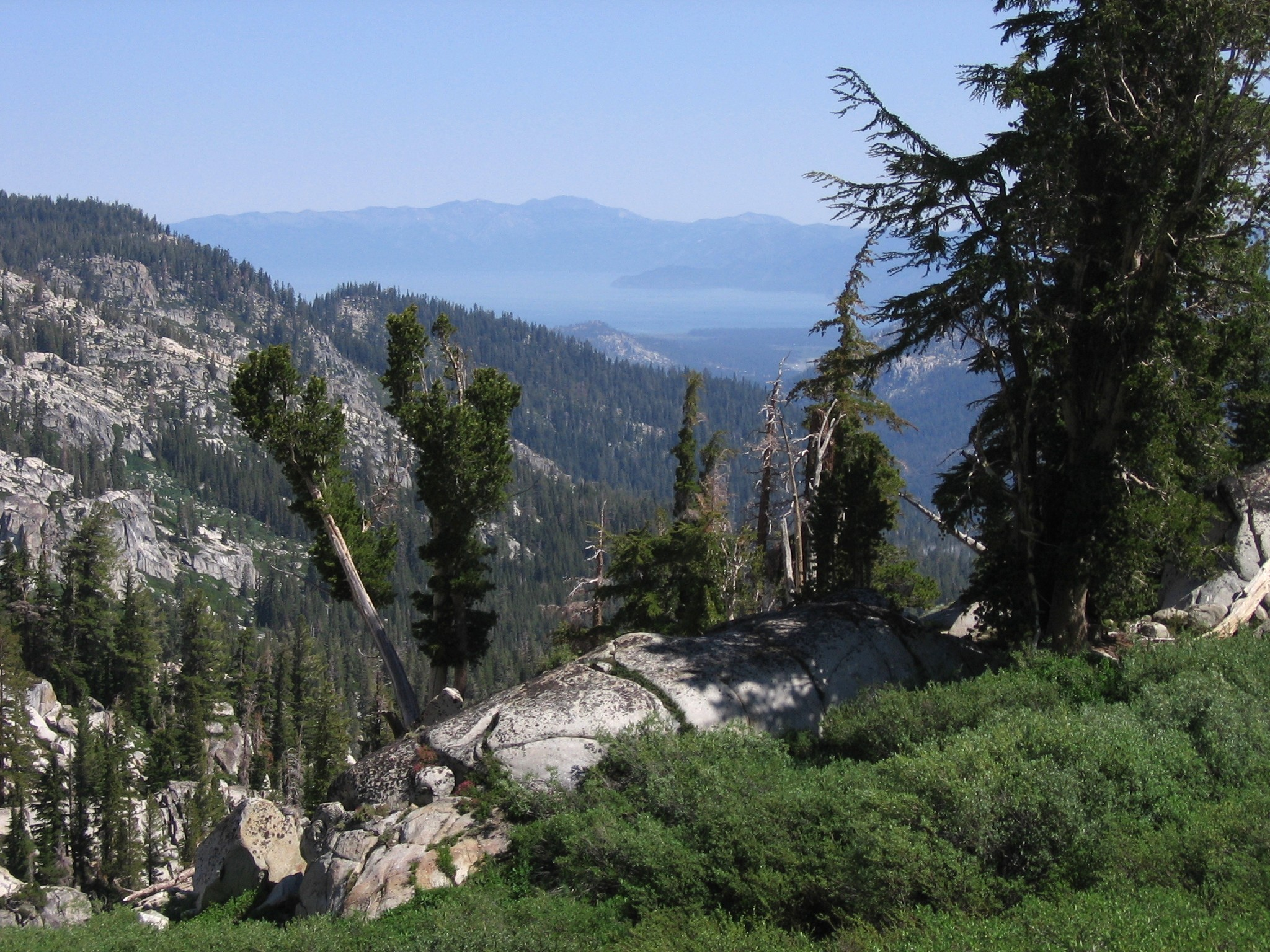
- Length: 165 mi (266 km)
- Location: California, Nevada, U.S.A
- Established: 1981
- Trailheads: Tahoe Meadows, Spooner Summit, Kingsbury North, Kingsbury South, Big Meadows, Echo Summit, Echo Lake, Tahoe City, Barker Pass, Brockway Summit, Mount Rose Summit, Glen Alpine Spring, Eagle Falls
- Use: Hiking, Equestrian, Mountain Biking
- Elevation change: 24,400 ft (7,400 m)
- Highest point: Relay Peak, 10,338 ft (3,151 m)
- Lowest point: Tahoe City, 6,240 ft (1,900 m)
- Season: Spring-Fall
- Surface: Natural/Gravel
- Website: tahoerimtrail.org

The Tahoe Rim Trail (TRT) is a 170-mile (274 km) long-distance hiking trail that forms a loop around the Lake Tahoe Basin in the Sierra Nevada and ranges of Nevada and California in the United States. The trail ranges in elevation from 6,223 feet (1,897 m) at the outlet of Lake Tahoe to 10,338 feet (3,151 m) at Relay Peak in Nevada. About 50 miles (80 km) of trail above the lake's west shore are also part of the national Pacific Crest Trail. Additionally, 96 miles of the trail along the east and south sides of the Lake Tahoe basin are designated as a National Recreation Trail.

== Background ==
The idea of a crest trail around Lake Tahoe was first proposed in 1978 by Glenn Hampton, a recreation officer of the Lake Tahoe Basin Management Unit (LTBMU) of the U.S. Forest Service. The trail was completed in September 2001, almost entirely through volunteer effort. The trail currently exists mostly on land managed by the LTBMU and Lake Tahoe–Nevada State Park, with shorter segments in the Tahoe National Forest and the Carson Ranger District of the Humboldt–Toiyabe National Forest.

The main hiking season is usually from July through September, though lingering snow patches may sometimes be found into August of high snow years. The trail is open year-round, but is not marked for winter use. The climate is typical of the Sierra Nevada, with severe storms during the winter and almost no precipitation falling in the summer.

Mountain bikes are permitted on roughly half the trail, and the entire trail is open to equestrians, other than a short segment in the north, and skiers. Motorized recreation is prohibited along its entire length. Hikers must obtain permits before entering the very popular Desolation Wilderness area southwest of the lake. The trail also passes through the Mount Rose Wilderness and the Granite Chief Wilderness. A section of the trail also passes through or near the Freel Roadless Area.

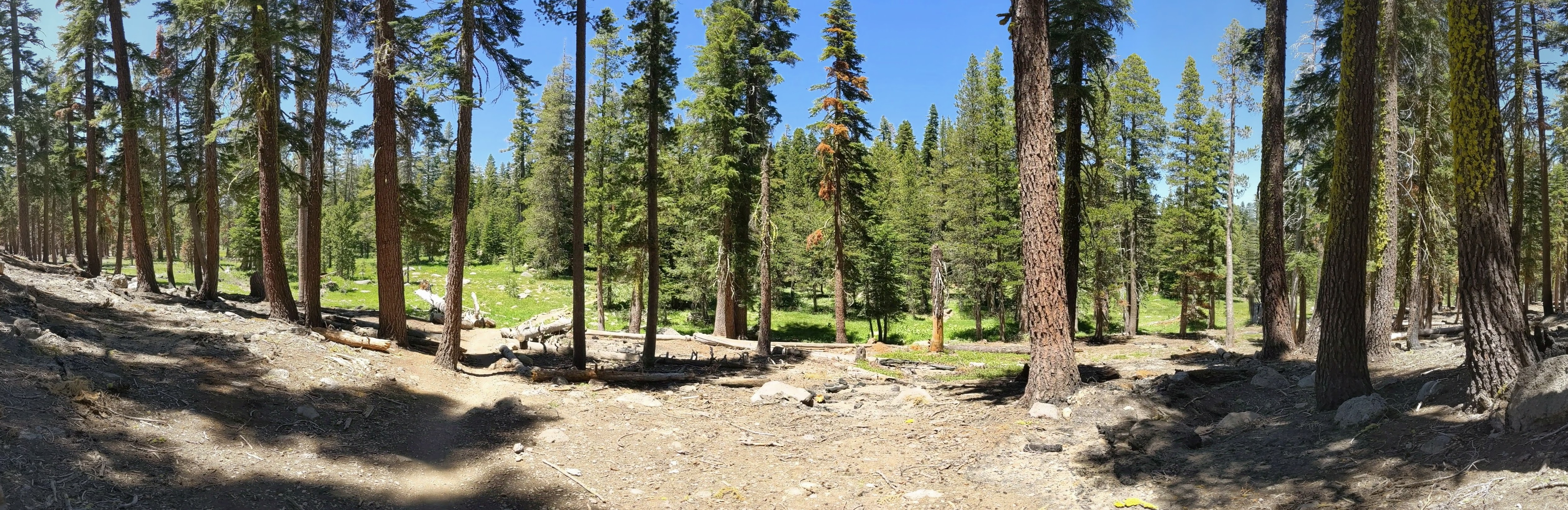
Tahoe Rim Trail approaching the Watson Creek headwaters meadow
