= List of Lake Tahoe peaks =

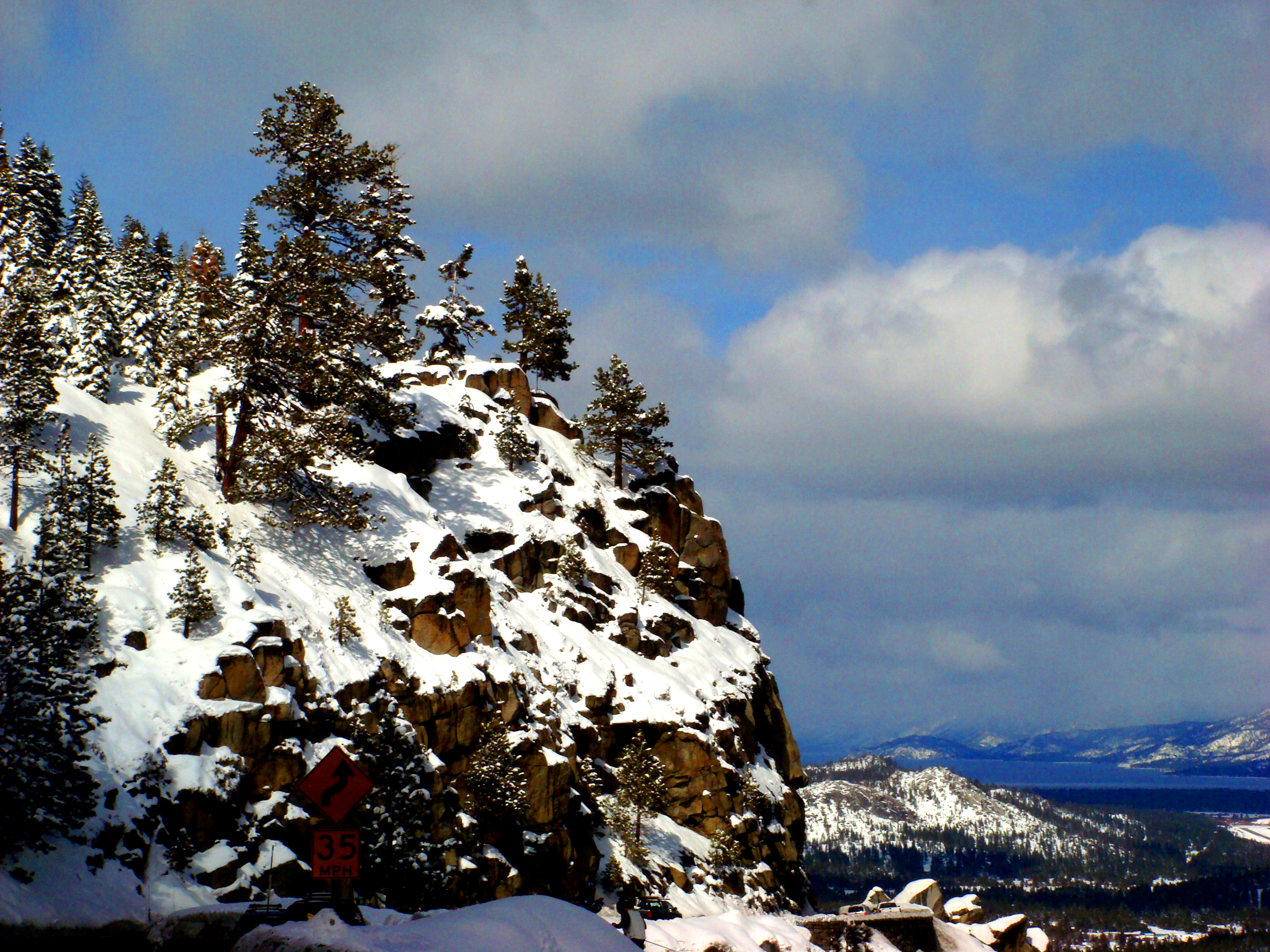
Rocky terrain is highlighted by a recent snow on US Highway 50 southwest of South Lake Tahoe.

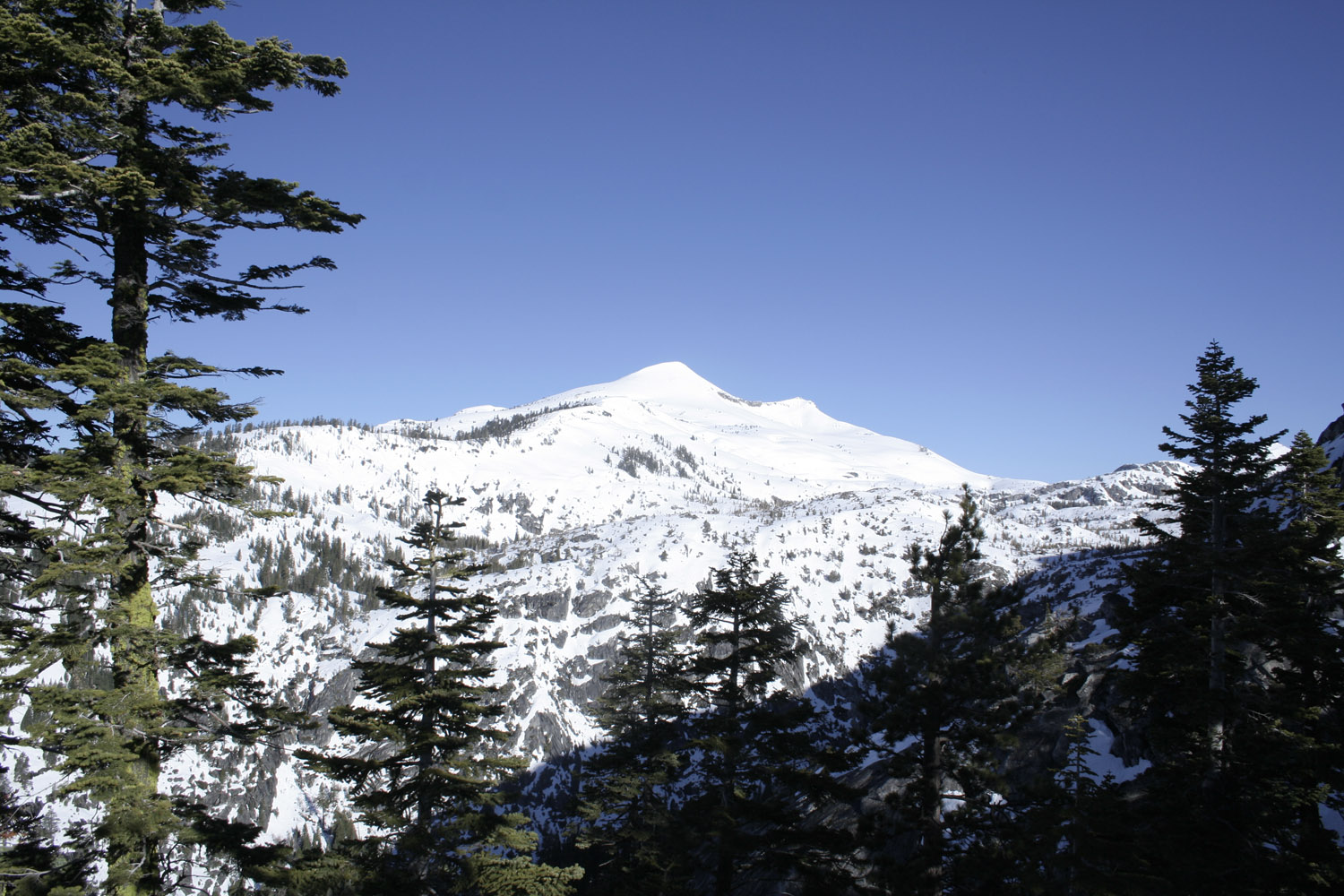
Pyramid Peak

Lake Tahoe is located in the Sierra Nevada of both California and Nevada. A list of notable mountains that surround the lake is shown below.

== Peaks ==
Peak name	Coordinates	Height	
Peak name	Coordinates	ft	m
Mount Rose	39°20′38″N 119°55′04″W	10,785	3,287
Mount Houghton	39°20′03″N 119°56′22″W	10,490	3,197
Tamarack Peak	39°19′06″N 119°55′17″W	9,897	3,017
Relay Peak	39°18′55″N 119°56′49″W	10,338	3,151
Rose Knob Peak	39°17′37″N 119°57′28″W	9,710	2,960
Snow Valley Peak	39°09′14″N 119°52′59″W	9,218	2,810
Duane Bliss Peak	39°04′50″N 119°52′41″W	8,661	2,640
Genoa Peak	39°02′35″N 119°52′53″W	9,152	2,790
East Peak	38°56′33″N 119°54′26″W	9,595	2,925
Monument Peak	38°55′23″N 119°53′52″W	10,064	3,068
Jobs Peak	38°51′28″N 119°51′41″W	10,638	3,242
Jobs Sister	38°51′44″N 119°53′04″W	10,823	3,299
Freel Peak	38°51′27″N 119°54′01″W	10,886	3,318
Red Lake Peak	38°42′51″N 119°59′15″W	10,068	3,069
Stevens Peak	38°44′01″N 119°58′58″W	10,051	3,064
Ralston Peak	38°49′59″N 120°06′06″W	9,239	2,816
Pyramid Peak	38°50′42″N 120°09′28″W	9,985	3,043
Dicks Peak	38°54′02″N 120°09′03″W	9,974	3,040
Mount Tallac	38°54′22″N 120°05′56″W	9,739	2,968
Maggies Peaks	38°55′54″N 120°06′50″W	8,703	2,653
Phipps Peak	38°57′16″N 120°08′59″W	9,238	2,816
Jakes Peak	38°58′12″N 120°07′21″W	9,187	2,800
Rubicon Peak	38°59′19″N 120°08′00″W	9,187	2,800
Ellis Peak	39°04′07″N 120°11′53″W	8,737	2,663
Twin Peaks	39°06′44″N 120°13′54″W	8,878	2,706
Ward Peak	39°08′53″N 120°14′45″W	8,635	2,632
Scott Peak	39°09′28″N 120°13′23″W	8,285	2,525
Granite Chief	39°11′54″N 120°17′13″W	9,010	2,746
Mount Pluto	39°14′30″N 120°08′23″W	8,617	2,626
Mount Lincoln	39°17′16″N 120°19′42″W	8,383	2,555
Mount Judah	39°17′55″N 120°18′56″W	8,243	2,512
Andesite Peak	39°21′04″N 120°22′00″W	8,218	2,505
Mount Lola	39°25′59″N 120°21′54″W	9,147	2,788
