= Rose Knob Peak =

Mountain in the American state of Nevada

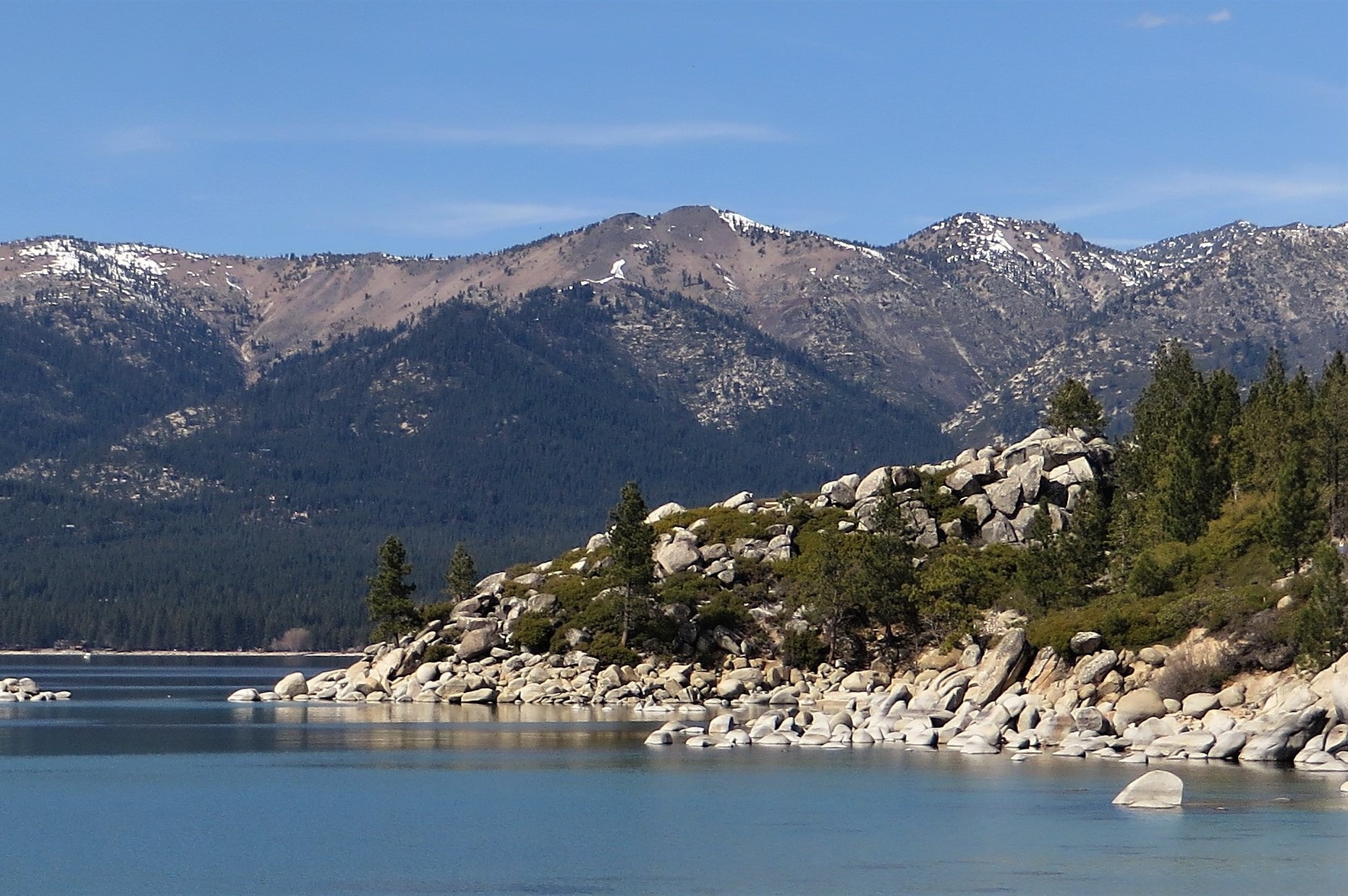
- South aspect, centered at top

Highest point
- Elevation: 9,710 ft (2,960 m)
- Prominence: 270 ft (82 m)
- Parent peak: Relay Peak (10,338 ft)
- Isolation: 1.61 mi (2.59 km)
- Coordinates: 39°17′37″N 119°57′28″W

Geography
- Location within Nevada Location within the United States
- Location: Mount Rose Wilderness
- Country: United States of America
- State: Nevada
- County: Washoe
- Parent range: Sierra Nevada; Carson Range
- Topo map: USGS Mount Rose

Climbing
- Easiest route: class 2

Rose Knob Peak is a 9,710-foot-elevation mountain summit located in Washoe County, Nevada, United States.

== Description ==
Rose Knob Peak is set four miles north of Lake Tahoe in the Mount Rose Wilderness, on land managed by the Humboldt-Toiyabe National Forest. It is part of the Carson Range which is a subset of the Sierra Nevada. It is situated 1.6 miles (2.6 km) south-southwest of line parent Relay Peak and three miles (4.8 km) north of Incline Village. Topographic relief is significant as the summit rises 2,500 feet (760 meters) above Third Creek in 1.5 mile. The Tahoe Rim Trail traverses the slope of the peak, providing an approach option. This landform's toponym has been officially adopted by the U.S. Board on Geographic Names.

== Climate ==
According to the Köppen climate classification system, Rose Knob Peak is located in an alpine climate zone. Most weather fronts originate in the Pacific Ocean, and travel east toward the Sierra Nevada mountains. As fronts approach, they are forced upward by the peaks (orographic lift), causing them to drop their moisture in the form of rain or snowfall onto the range. Most of the snow in Nevada falls from December through March.

== See also ==
- List of Lake Tahoe peaks

== Gallery ==
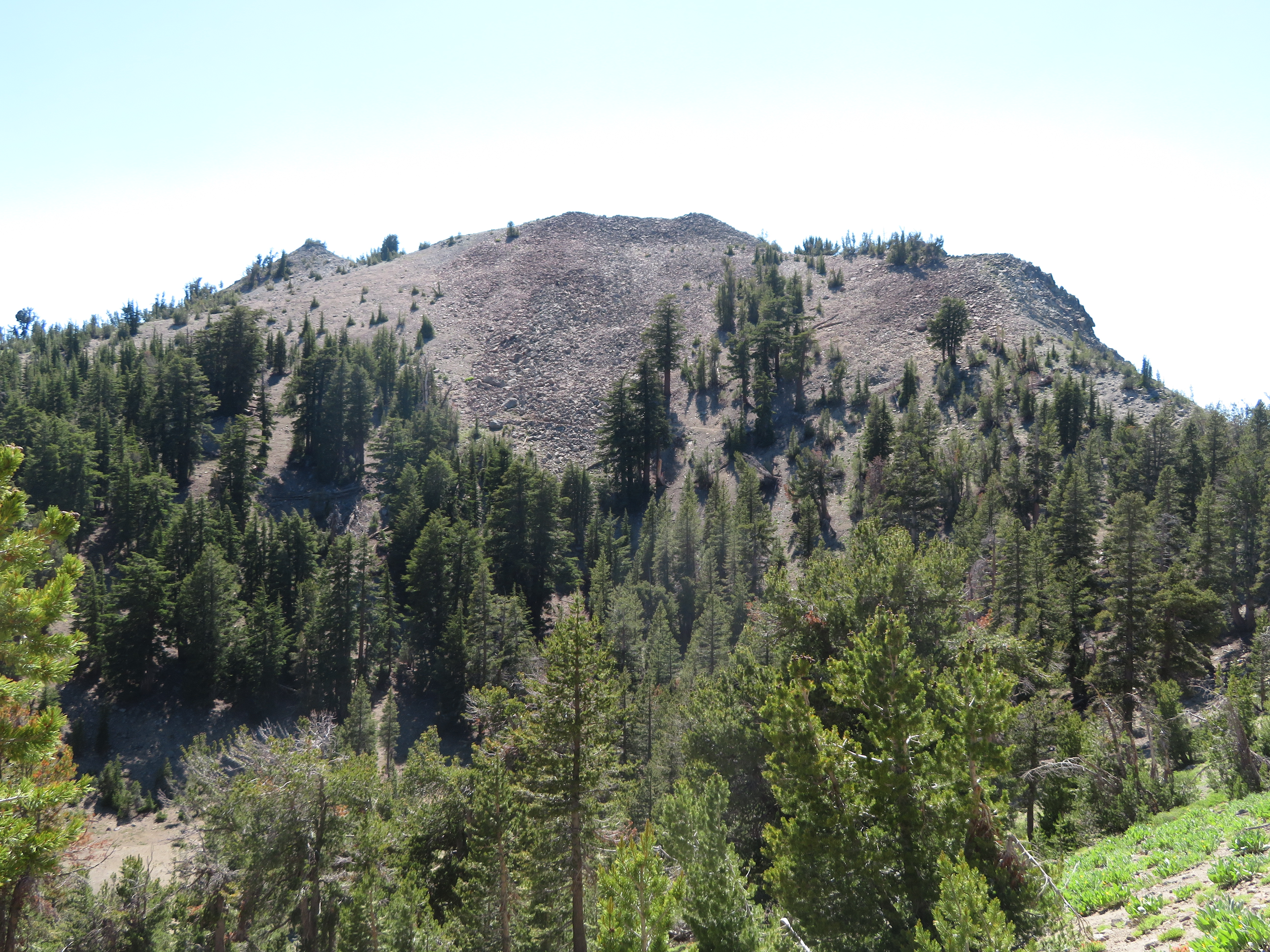
Northeast aspect

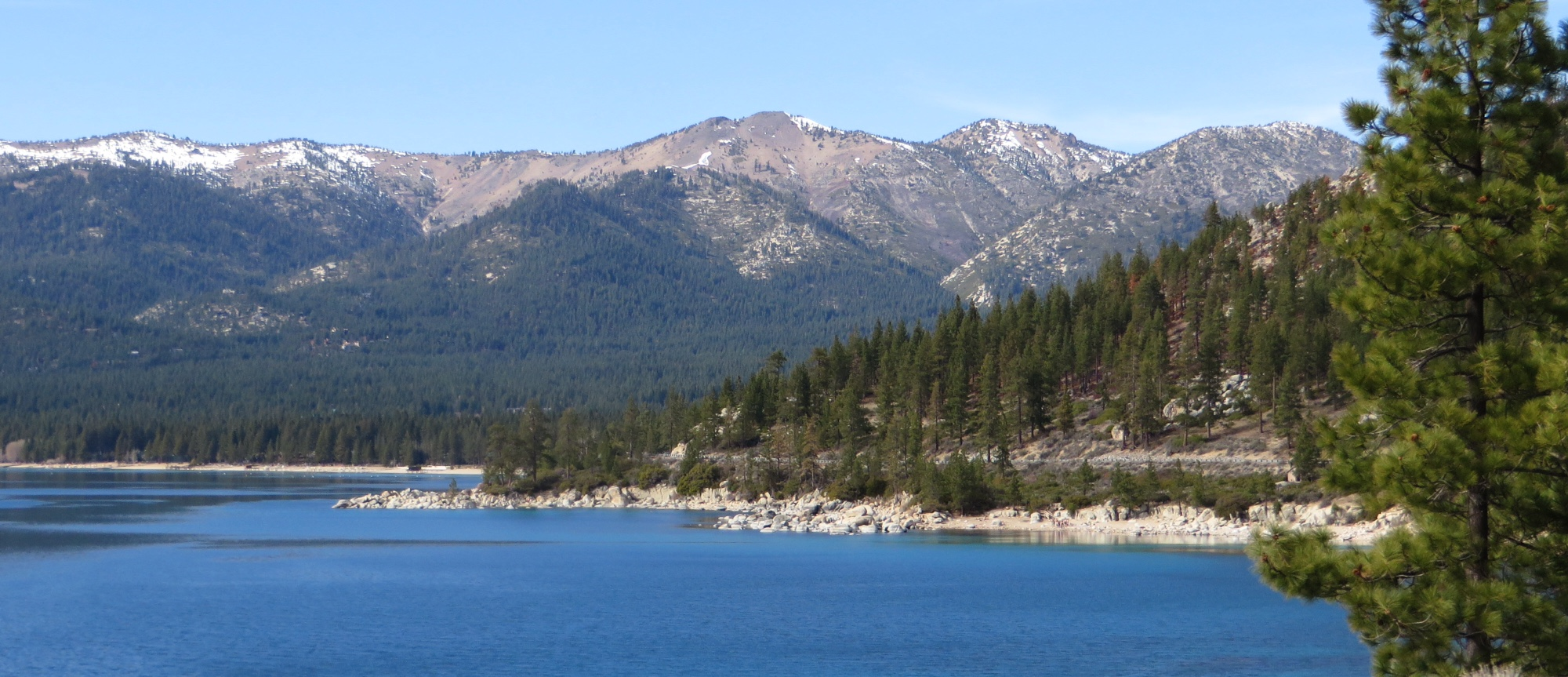
South aspect centered, from Lake Tahoe
