= Tamarack Peak =

Mountain in the American state of Nevada

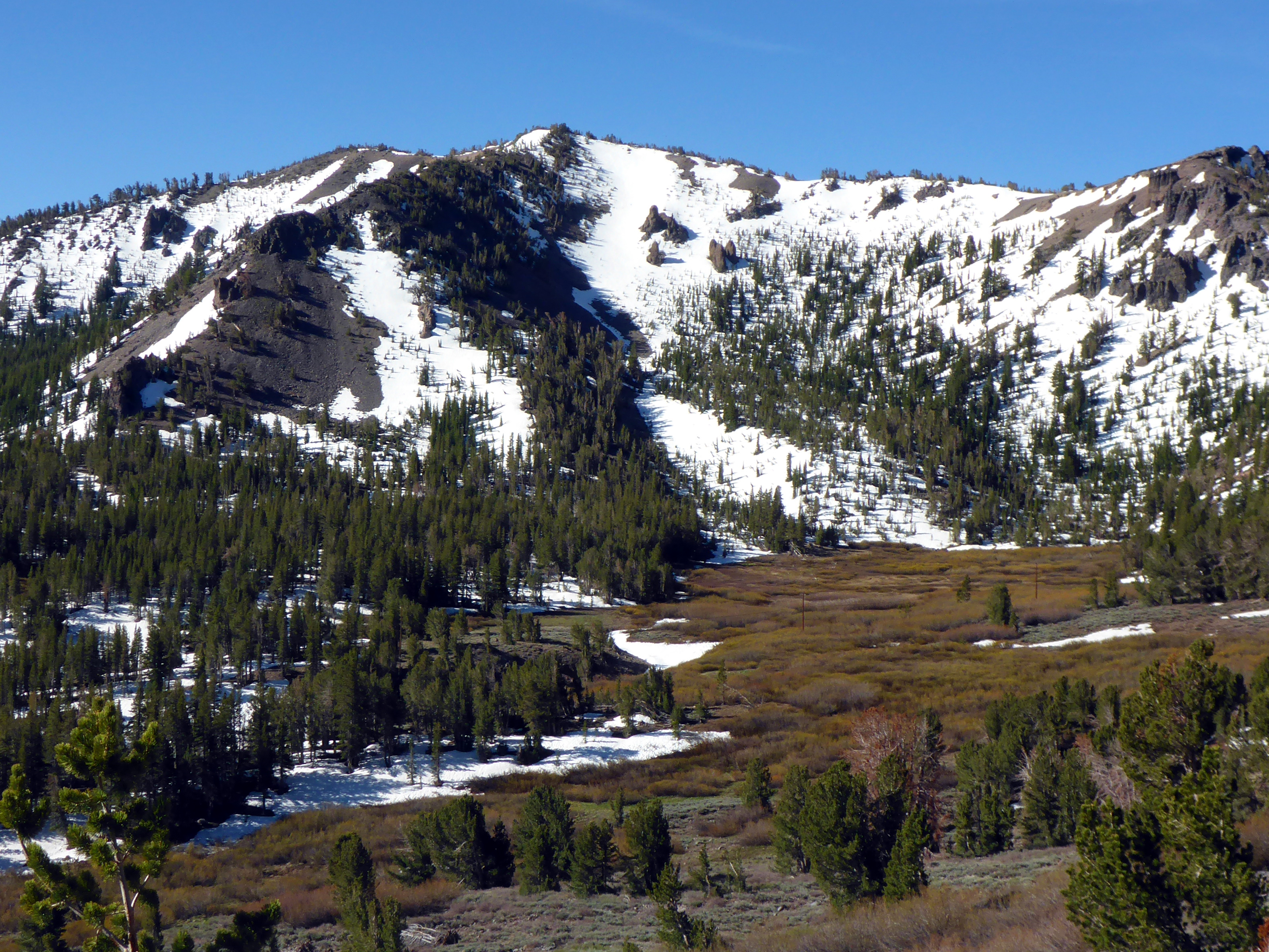
- North aspect

Highest point
- Elevation: 9,897 ft (3,017 m)
- Prominence: 497 ft (151 m)
- Parent peak: Relay Peak (10,338 ft)
- Isolation: 1.38 mi (2.22 km)
- Coordinates: 39°19′06″N 119°55′17″W

Naming
- Etymology: Tamarack pine

Geography
- Location within Nevada Location within the United States
- Location: Lake Tahoe Basin Management Unit
- Country: United States of America
- State: Nevada
- County: Washoe
- Parent range: Sierra Nevada; Carson Range
- Topo map: USGS Mount Rose

Climbing
- Easiest route: class 2 hiking

Tamarack Peak is a 9,897-foot-elevation mountain summit located in Washoe County, Nevada, United States.

== Description ==
Tamarack Peak is set six miles north of Lake Tahoe on the boundary that Lake Tahoe Basin Management Unit shares with Humboldt-Toiyabe National Forest. It is part of the Carson Range, which is a subset of the Sierra Nevada. It is situated 1.4 miles (2.3 km) east of line parent Relay Peak, 1.8 miles (2.9 km) south of Mount Rose and five miles (8.0 km) north of Incline Village. Topographic relief is modest as the summit rises 1,344 feet (410 meters) above Tahoe Meadows in one mile. Precipitation runoff from this mountain drains north into headwaters of Galena Creek, and south to Ophir Creek. The Tahoe Rim Trail traverses the slopes of the peak, providing an approach option.

== Etymology ==
This landform's toponym was officially adopted in 1988 by the U.S. Board on Geographic Names. The peak is named for the Tamarack tree, a member of the larch family which does not grow in this region, but may have been confused with the Tamarack pine (Pinus contorta murrayana), also called Sierra lodgepole pine, which is a common tree around Lake Tahoe.

== Climate ==
According to the Köppen climate classification system, Tamarack Peak is located in an alpine climate zone. Most weather fronts originate in the Pacific Ocean, and travel east toward the Sierra Nevada mountains. As fronts approach, they are forced upward by the peaks (orographic lift), causing them to drop their moisture in the form of rain or snowfall onto the range. Most of the snow in Nevada falls from December through March.

== See also ==
- List of Lake Tahoe peaks

== Gallery ==
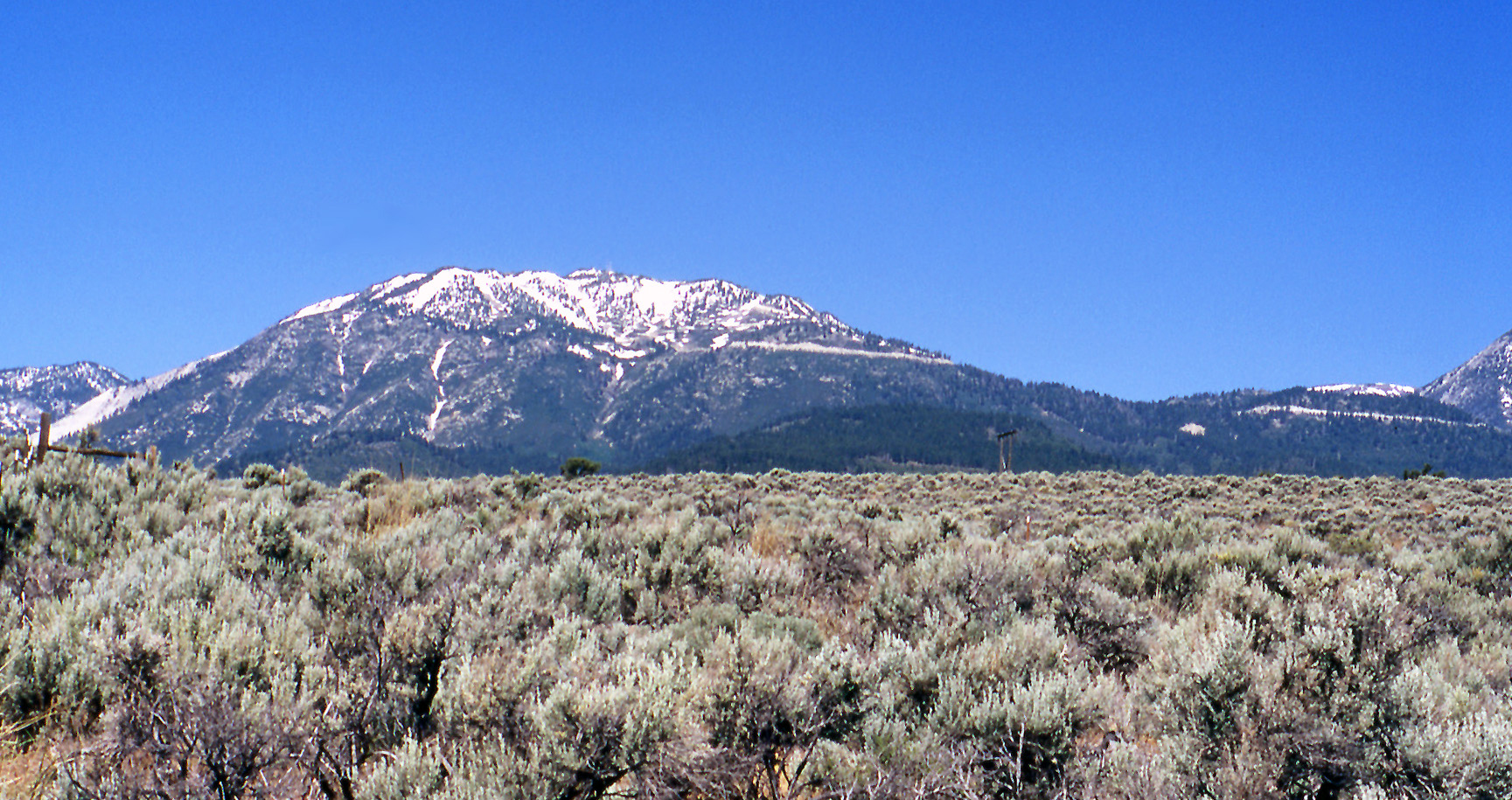
South aspect

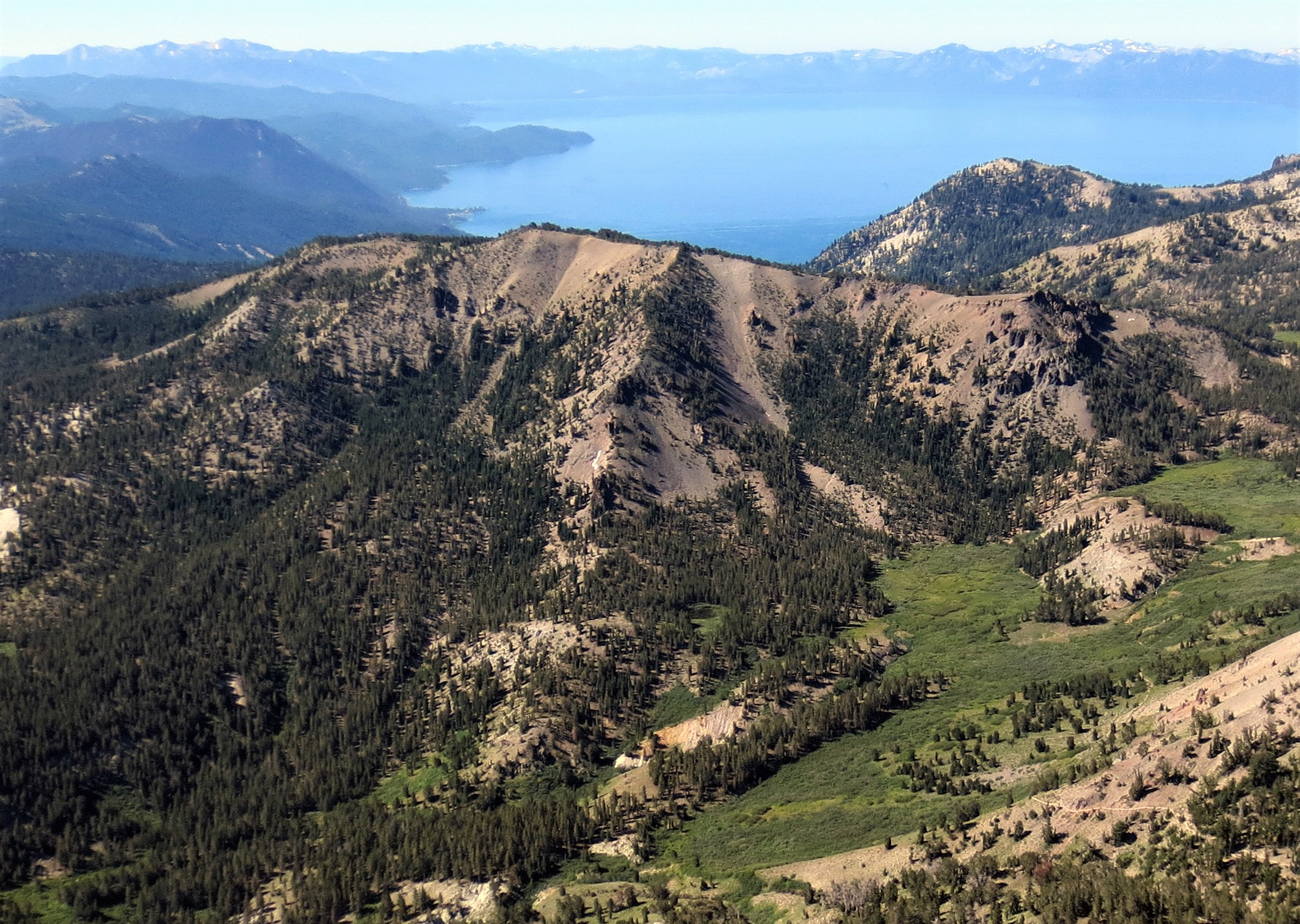
Tamarack Peak and Lake Tahoe seen from Mt. Rose

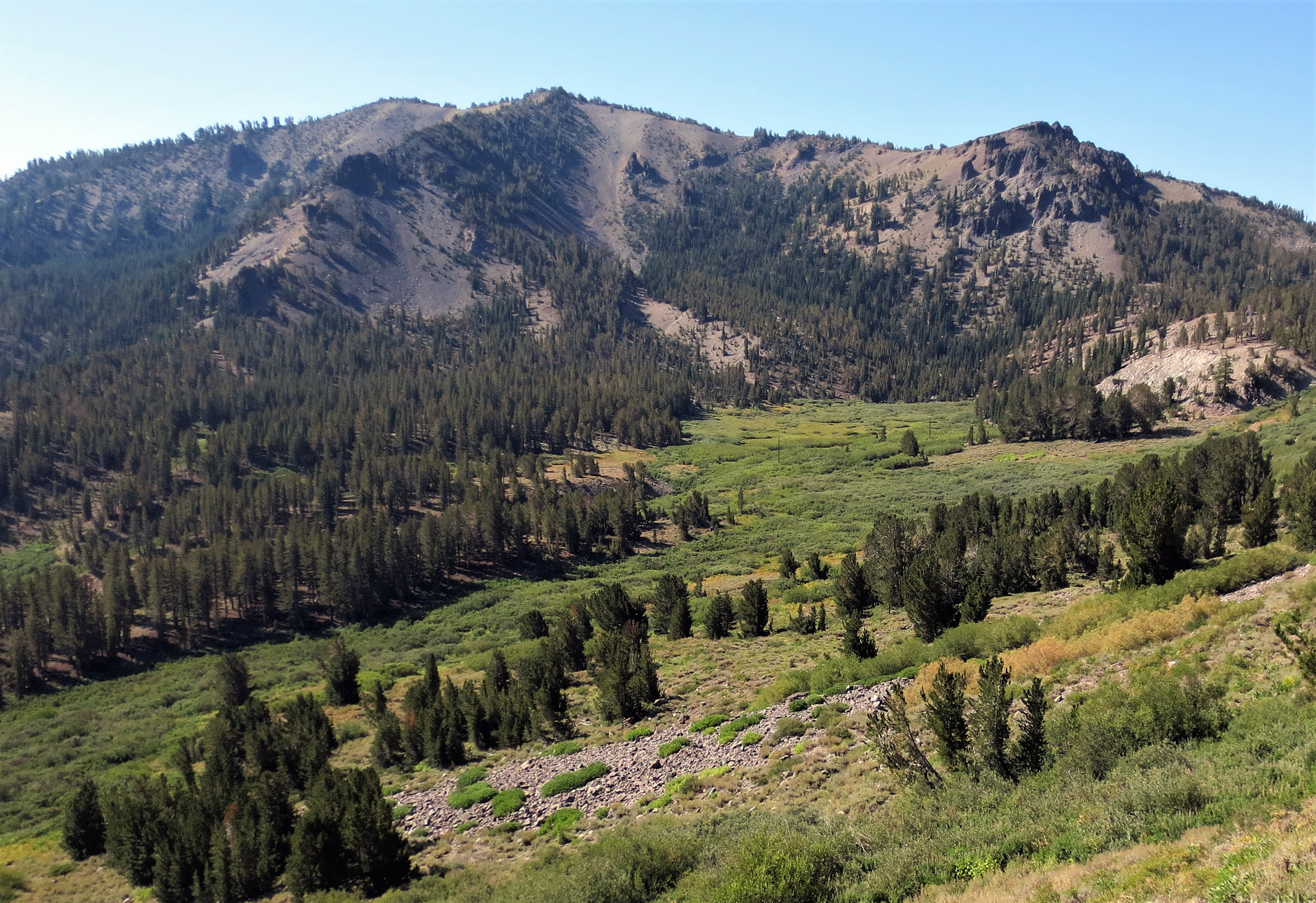
North aspect of Tamarack Peak from Galena Creek Upper Meadow

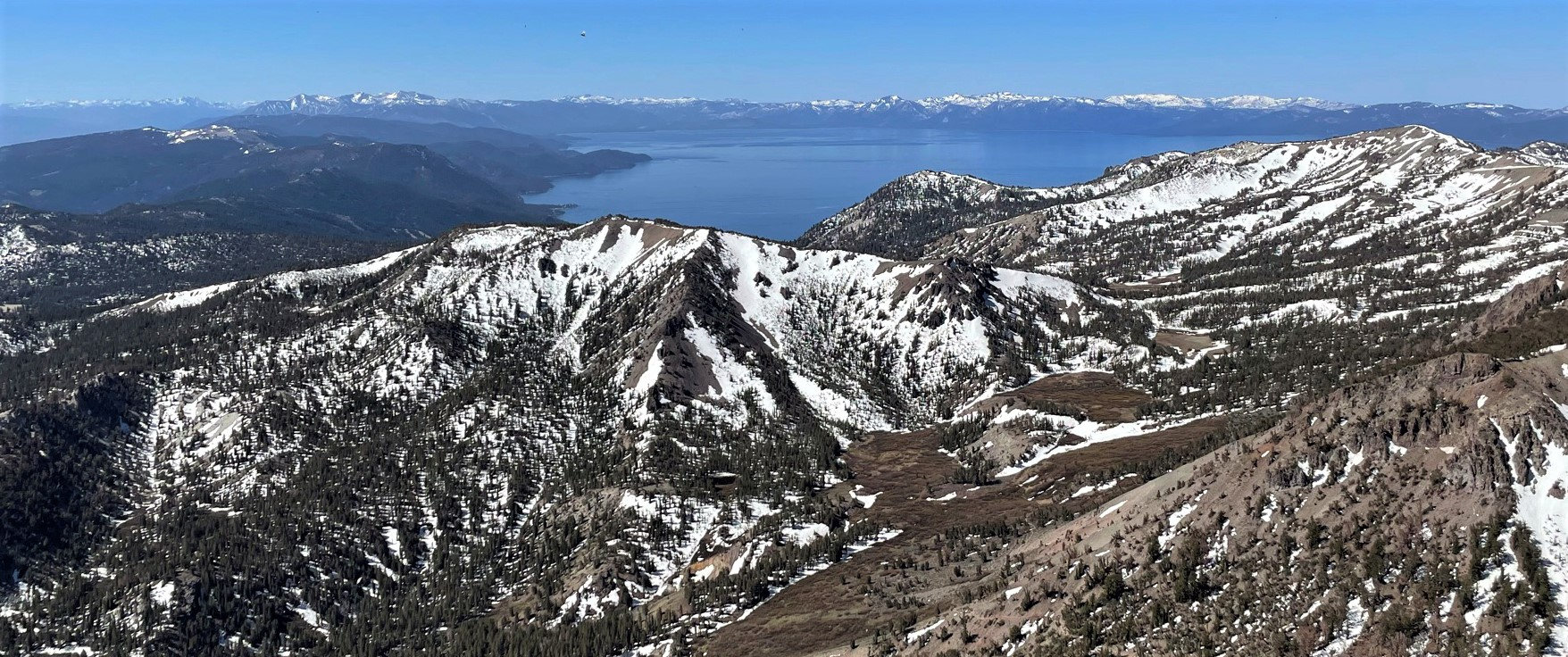
North aspect of Tamarack Peak (left of center) seen from Mt. Rose
(Relay Peak in upper right corner)

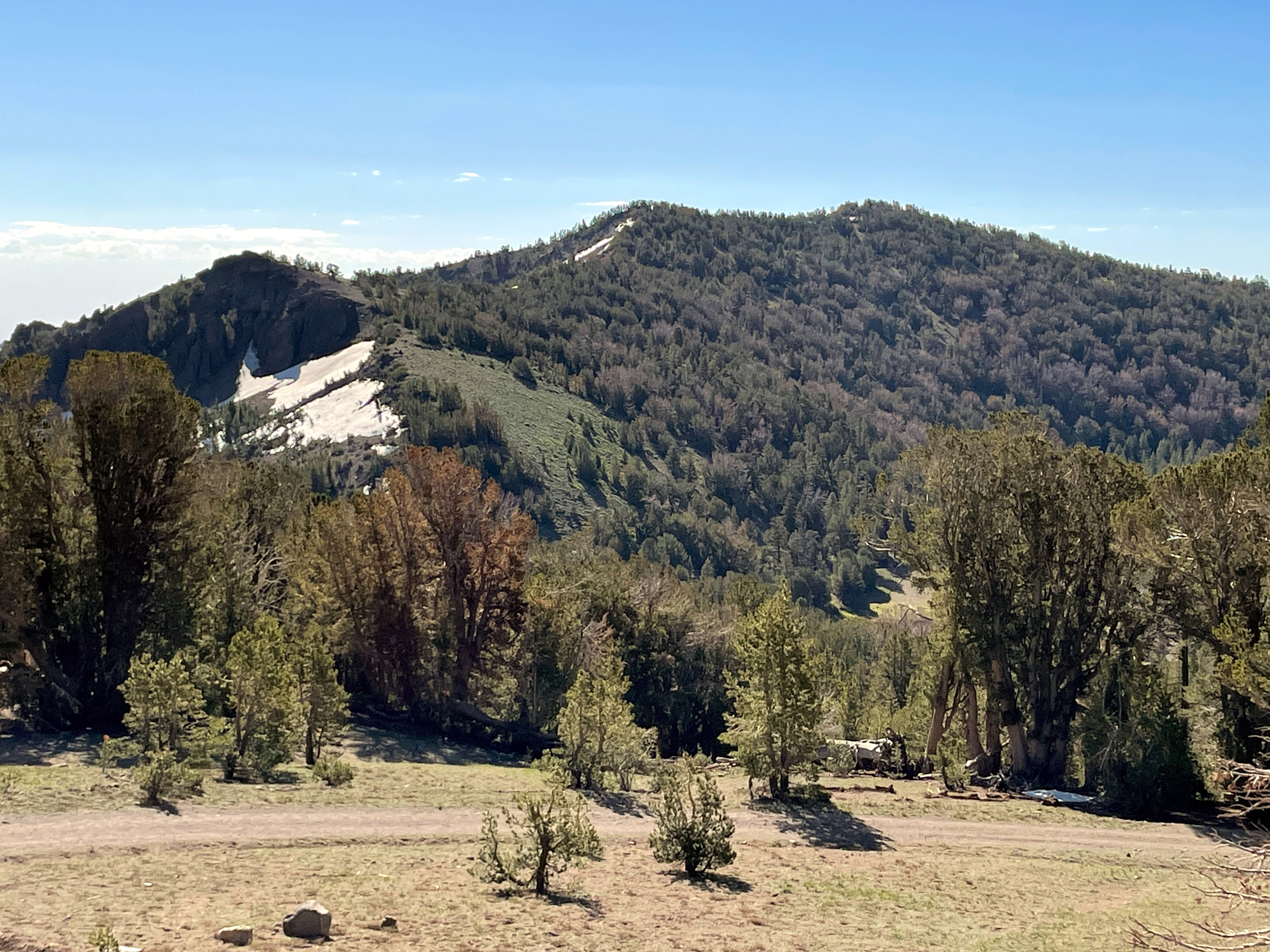
West aspect

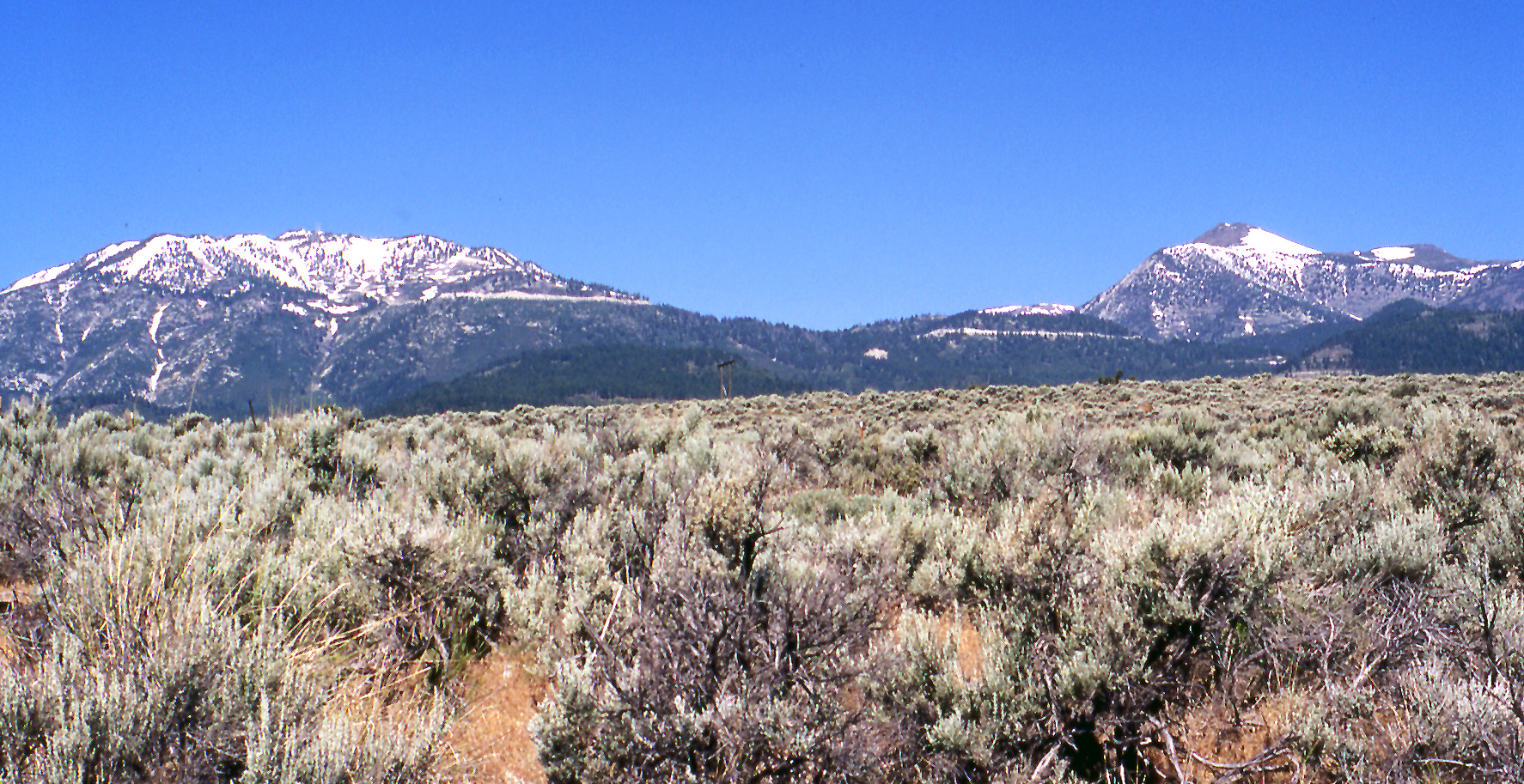
Tamarack Peak (left) and Mt. Rose (right)
