= Twin Peaks (Placer County, California) =

Double summit mountain in the state of California

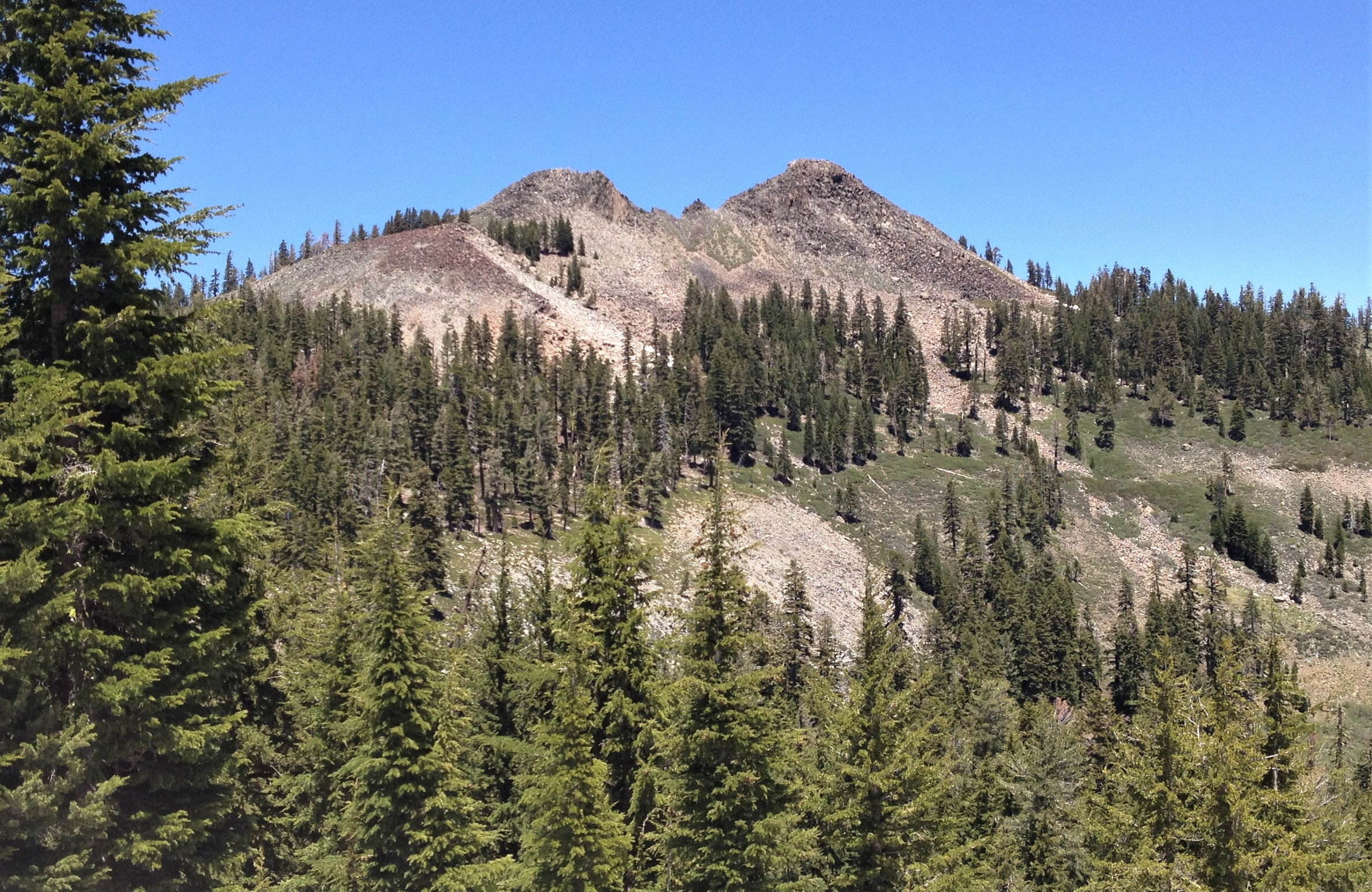
- South aspect

Highest point
- Elevation: 8,878 ft (2,706 m)
- Prominence: 1,318 ft (402 m)
- Parent peak: Squaw Peak (8,885 ft)
- Isolation: 5.15 mi (8.29 km)
- Listing: Tahoe OGUL Peak
- Coordinates: 39°06′44″N 120°13′54″W

Geography
- Location within California Location within the United States
- Location: Granite Chief Wilderness
- Country: United States of America
- State: California
- County: Placer
- Parent range: Sierra Nevada
- Topo map: USGS Homewood

Climbing
- Easiest route: class 2

Twin Peaks is an 8,878-foot-elevation (2,706-meter) double summit mountain in Placer County, California, United States.

== Description ==
Twin Peaks is located four miles west of Tahoe Pines and Lake Tahoe, along the boundary that Lake Tahoe Basin Management Unit shares with Granite Chief Wilderness. It is situated on the crest of the Sierra Nevada mountain range, with precipitation runoff from the peak draining east to Lake Tahoe, and west to the Rubicon River via Bear Pen Creek. Topographic relief is modest as the summit rises over 2,400 feet (730 meters) above Blackwood Canyon in 1.5 mile. Blackwood and Ward valleys, which each head near Twin Peaks and terminate at Lake Tahoe, were formed by glaciers. The Alpine Meadows ski area is three miles north of Twin Peaks. The Tahoe Rim Trail traverses the south slope of the peak and the Pacific Crest Trail traverses the west slope, which provide approach options. This landform's descriptive toponym has been officially adopted by the U.S. Board on Geographic Names. It was originally named "Twin Peak" by the Wheeler Survey in the 1870s and it has appeared in publications since at least 1891.

== Climate ==
According to the Köppen climate classification system, Twin Peaks is located in an alpine climate zone. Most weather fronts originate in the Pacific Ocean and travel east toward the Sierra Nevada mountains. As fronts approach, they are forced upward by the peaks (orographic lift), causing them to drop their moisture in the form of rain or snowfall onto the range.

== See also ==
- List of Lake Tahoe peaks

== Gallery ==
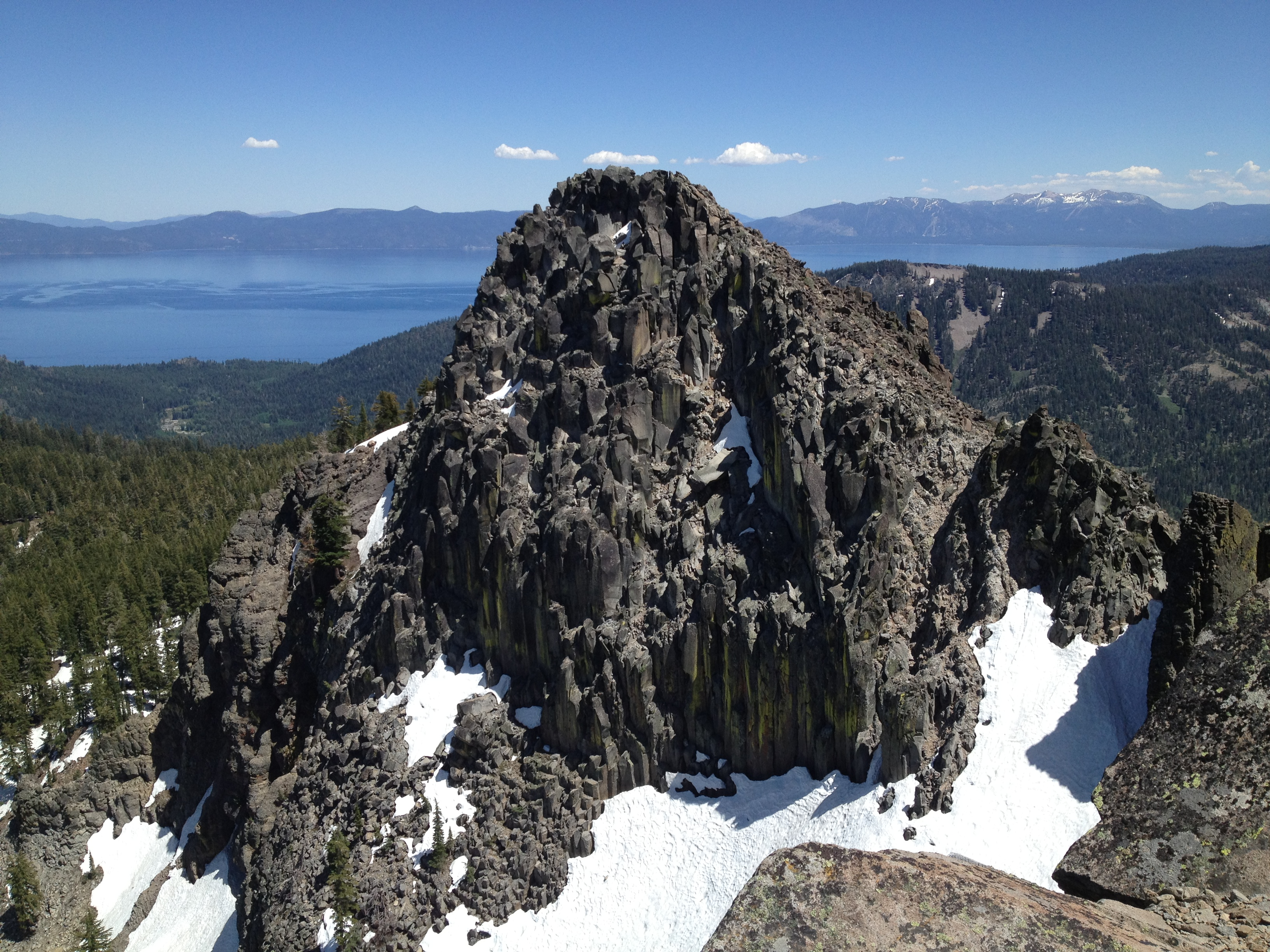
East (true) summit of Twin Peaks seen from the west peak

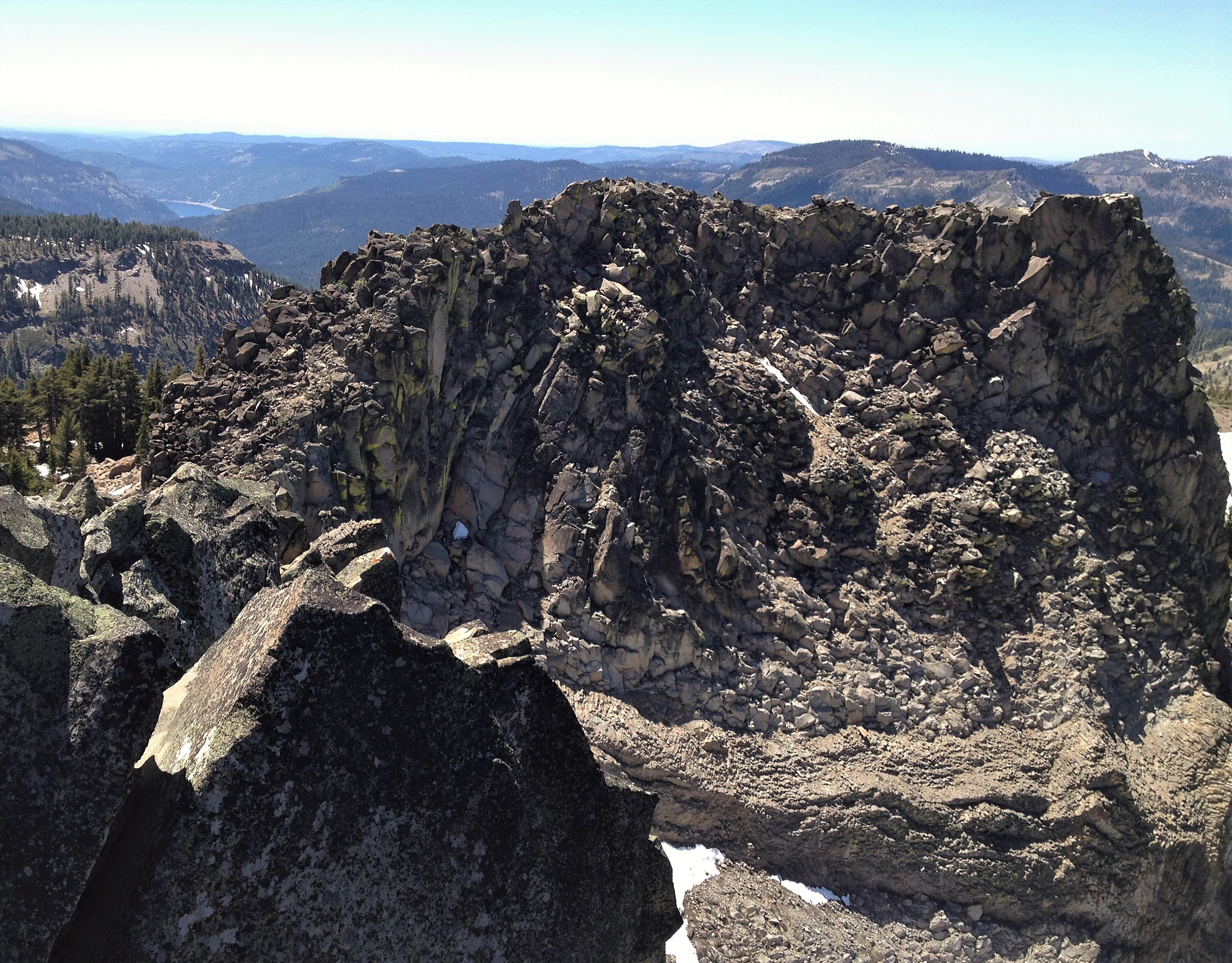
West (lower) peak of Twin Peaks seen from the east summit

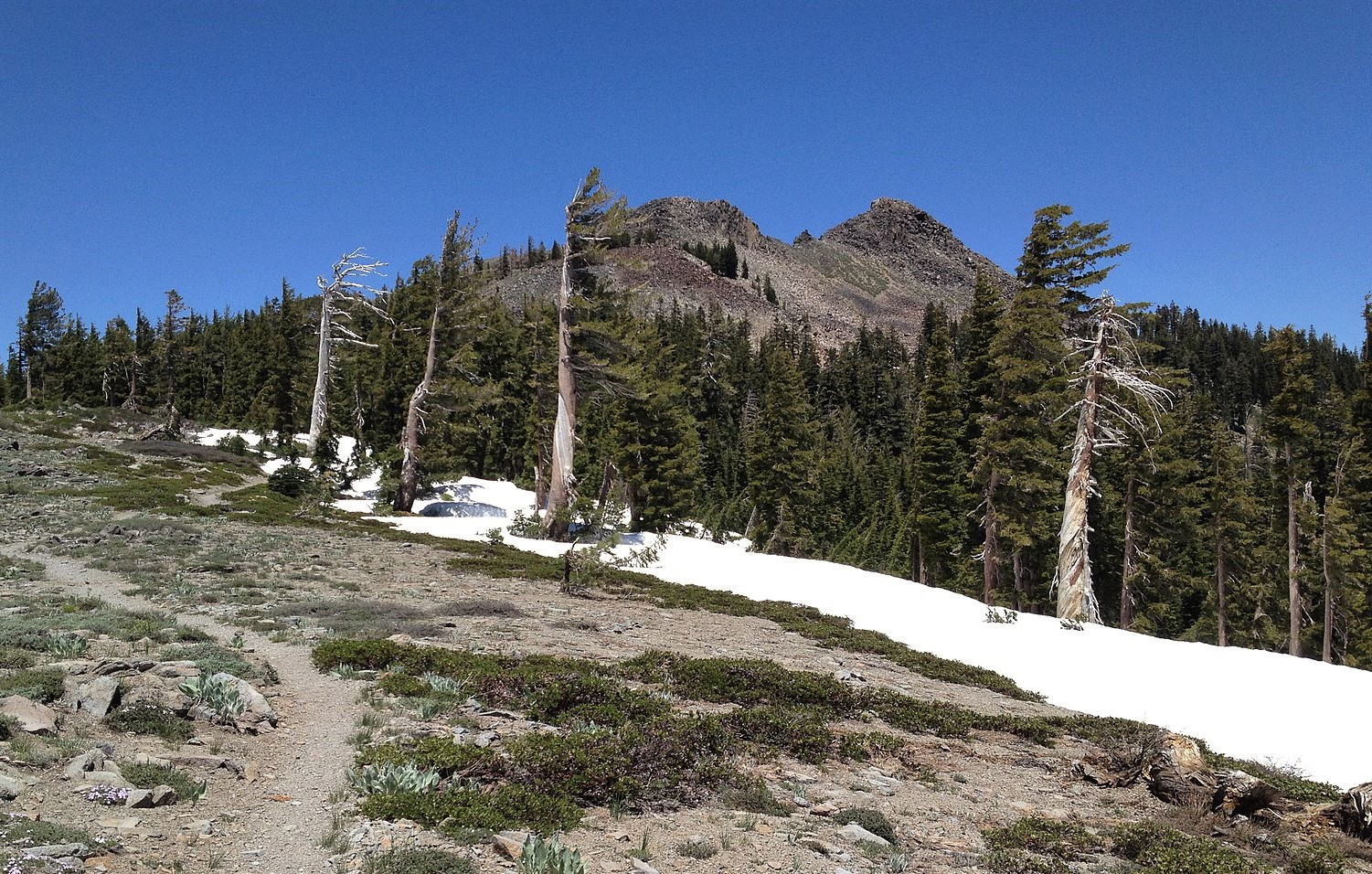
South aspect, from PCT

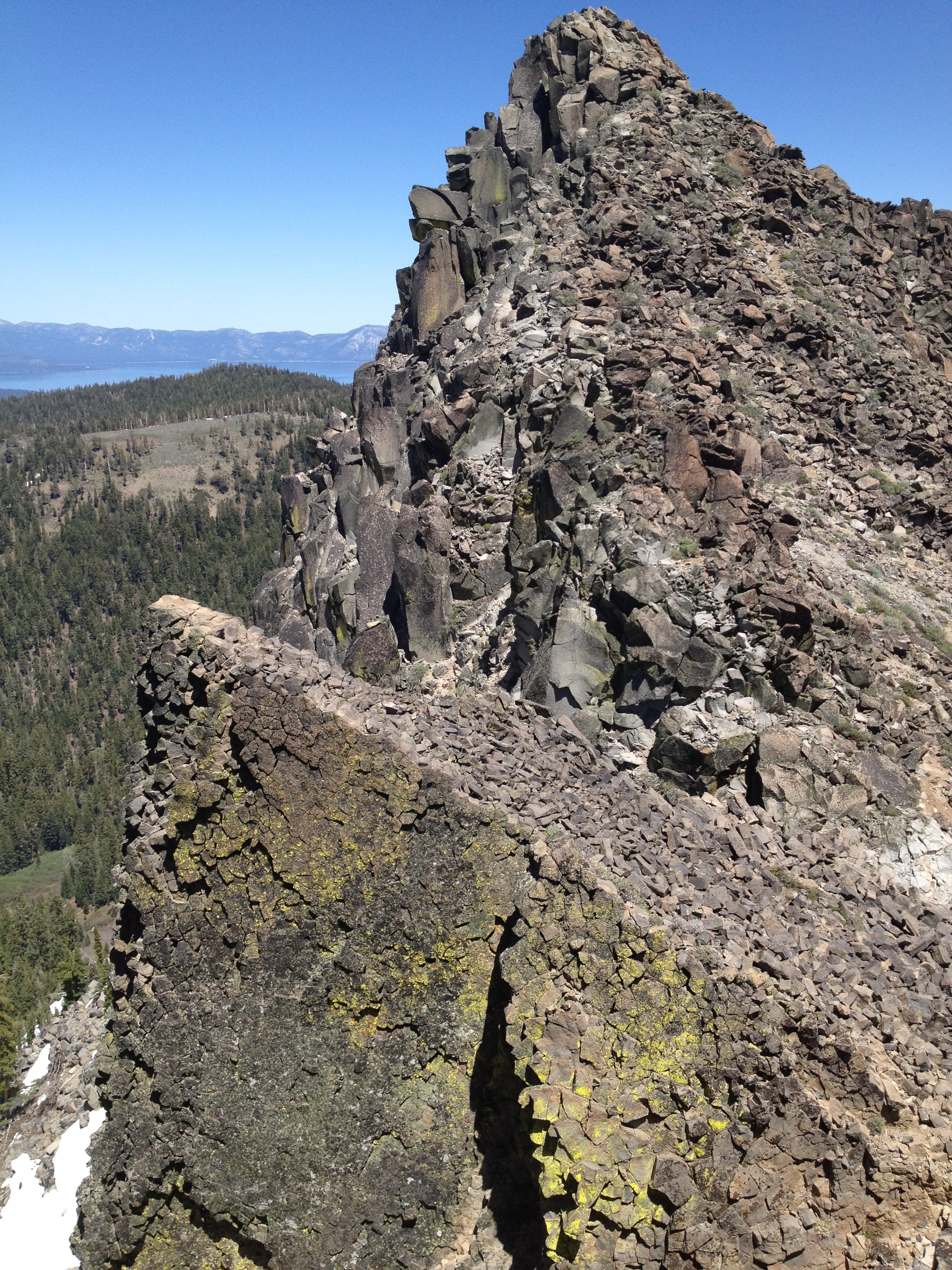
East summit
