= Mount Houghton =

Mountain in the American state of Nevada

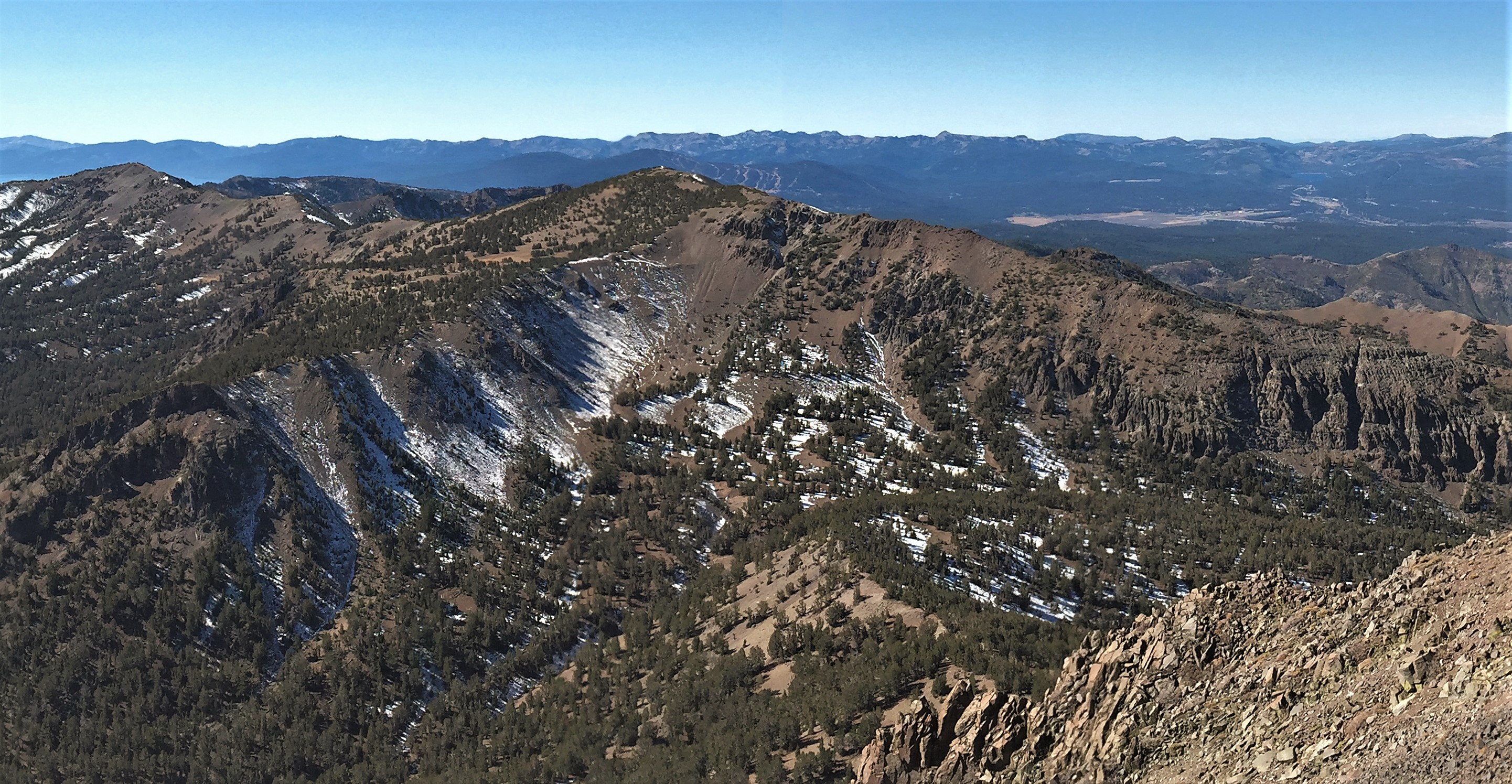
- Northeast aspect, from Mt. Rose

Highest point
- Elevation: 10,490 ft (3,200 m)
- Prominence: 759 ft (231 m)
- Parent peak: Mount Rose (10,776 ft)
- Isolation: 1.34 mi (2.16 km)
- Coordinates: 39°20′03″N 119°56′22″W

Naming
- Etymology: John G. Houghton

Geography
- Location within Nevada Location within the United States
- Location: Mount Rose Wilderness
- Country: United States of America
- State: Nevada
- County: Washoe
- Parent range: Sierra Nevada; Carson Range
- Topo map: USGS Mount Rose

Climbing
- Easiest route: class 1 hiking

Mount Houghton is a 10,490-foot-elevation mountain summit located in Washoe County, Nevada, United States.

== Description ==
Mount Houghton is set seven miles north of Lake Tahoe in the Mount Rose Wilderness, on land managed by the Humboldt-Toiyabe National Forest. It is the highest point of Relay Ridge, second-highest peak within the wilderness, and ranks as the seventh-highest peak of the Carson Range, which is a subset of the Sierra Nevada. It is situated 1.4 miles (2.3 km) north of Relay Peak, 1.4 miles (2.3 km) southwest of line parent Mount Rose and six miles (9.7 km) north of Incline Village. Topographic relief is significant as the west aspect rises 2,000 feet (610 meters) above Gray Creek in one mile. The Tahoe Rim Trail traverses the southern base of the peak, providing an approach option.

== Etymology ==
This landform's toponym was officially adopted in 1988 by the U.S. Board on Geographic Names to remember Dr. John Greenleaf Houghton (1940–1979), professor of geography at the University of Nevada, Reno. He was one of 257 people who perished November 29, 1979, when Air New Zealand Flight 901 flew into Mount Erebus on Ross Island, Antarctica, killing all 237 passengers and 20 crew on board.

== Climate ==
According to the Köppen climate classification system, Mount Houghton is located in an alpine climate zone. Most weather fronts originate in the Pacific Ocean, and travel east toward the Sierra Nevada mountains. As fronts approach, they are forced upward by the peaks (orographic lift), causing them to drop their moisture in the form of rain or snowfall onto the range. Most of the snow in Nevada falls from December through March.

== See also ==
- List of Lake Tahoe peaks

== Gallery ==
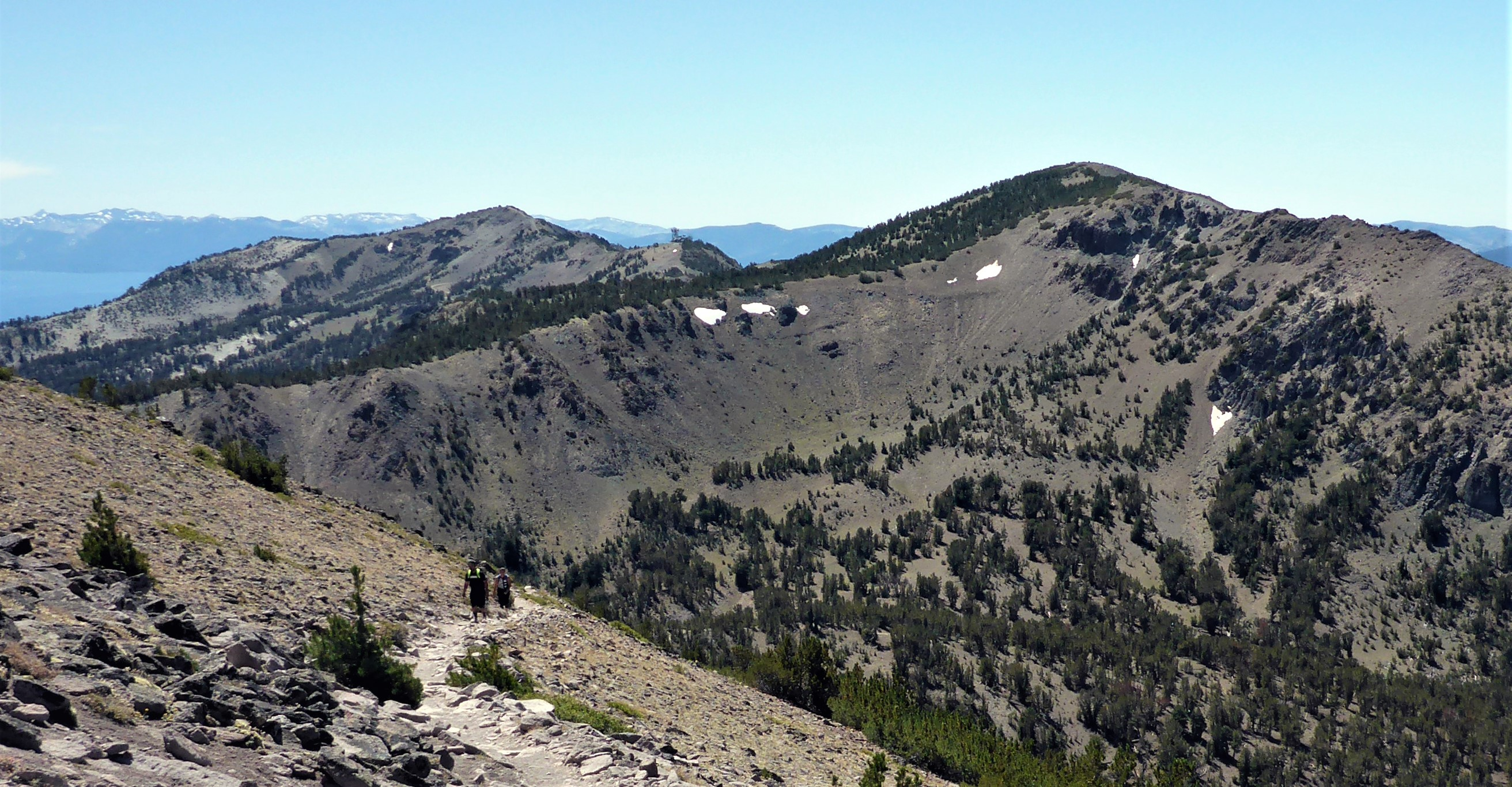
Mt. Houghton (right) and Relay Peak (left) viewed from Mt. Rose Trail

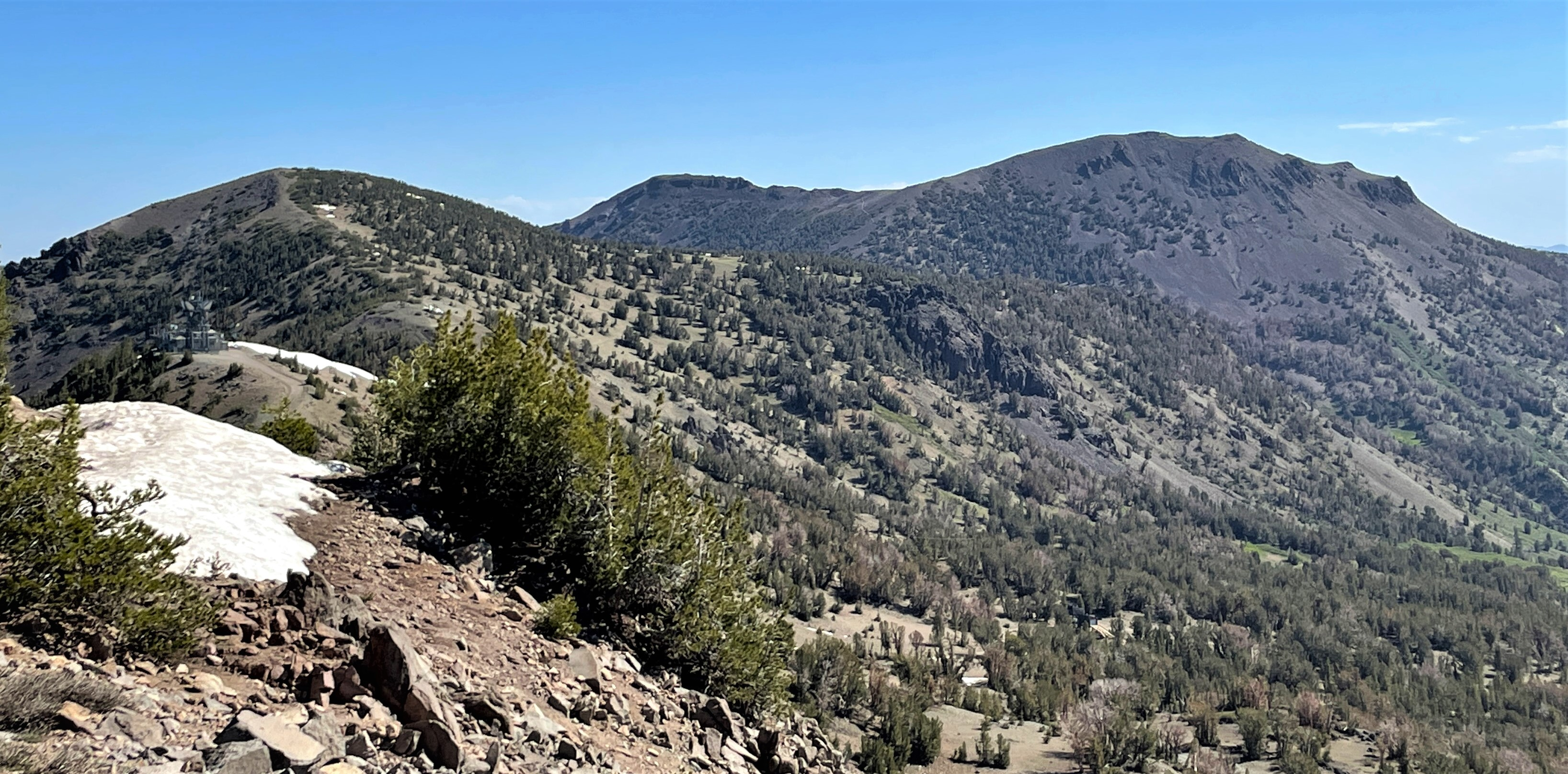
Mt. Houghton (left), Mt. Rose (right)

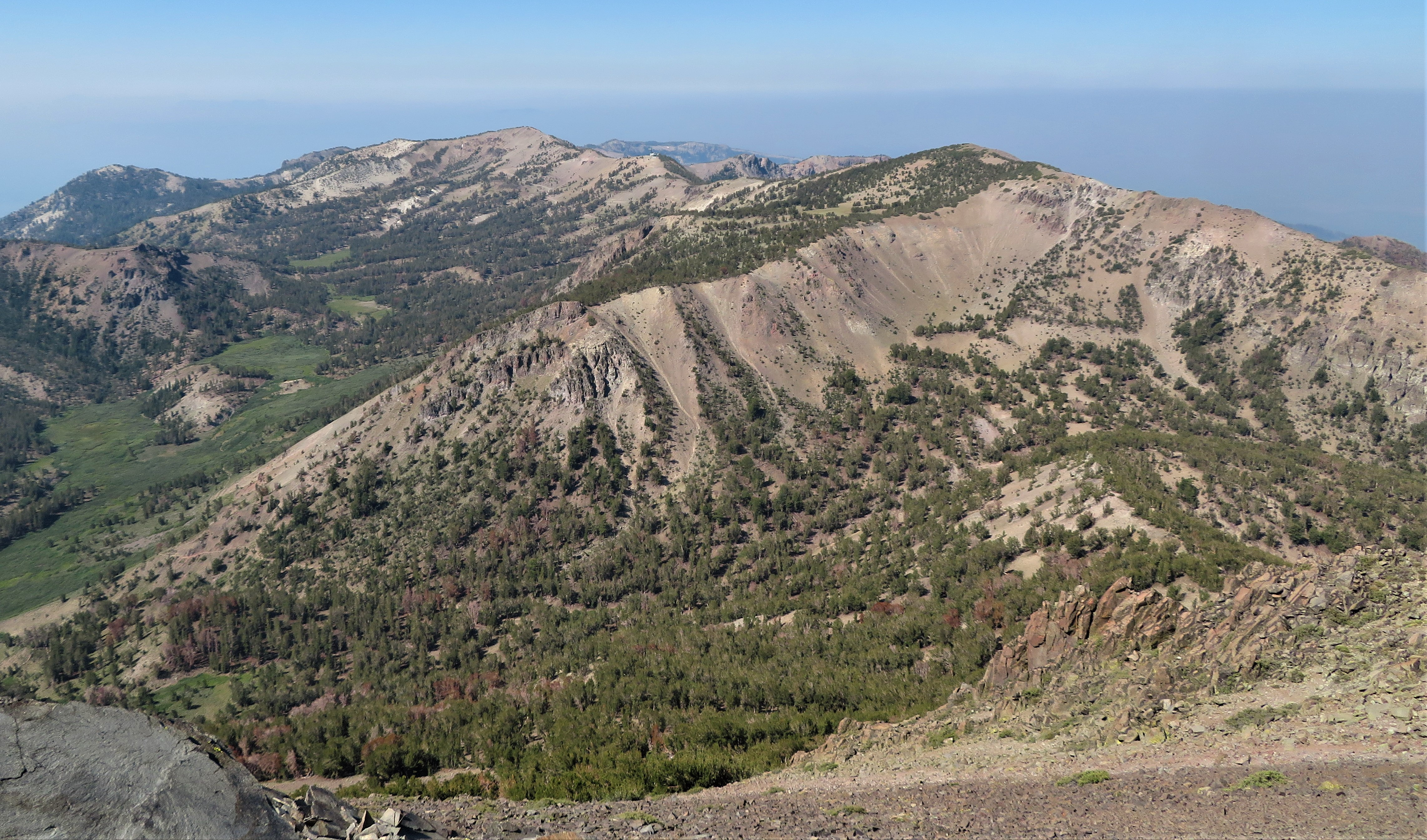
Mt. Houghton (right) and Relay Peak (left) viewed from Mt. Rose

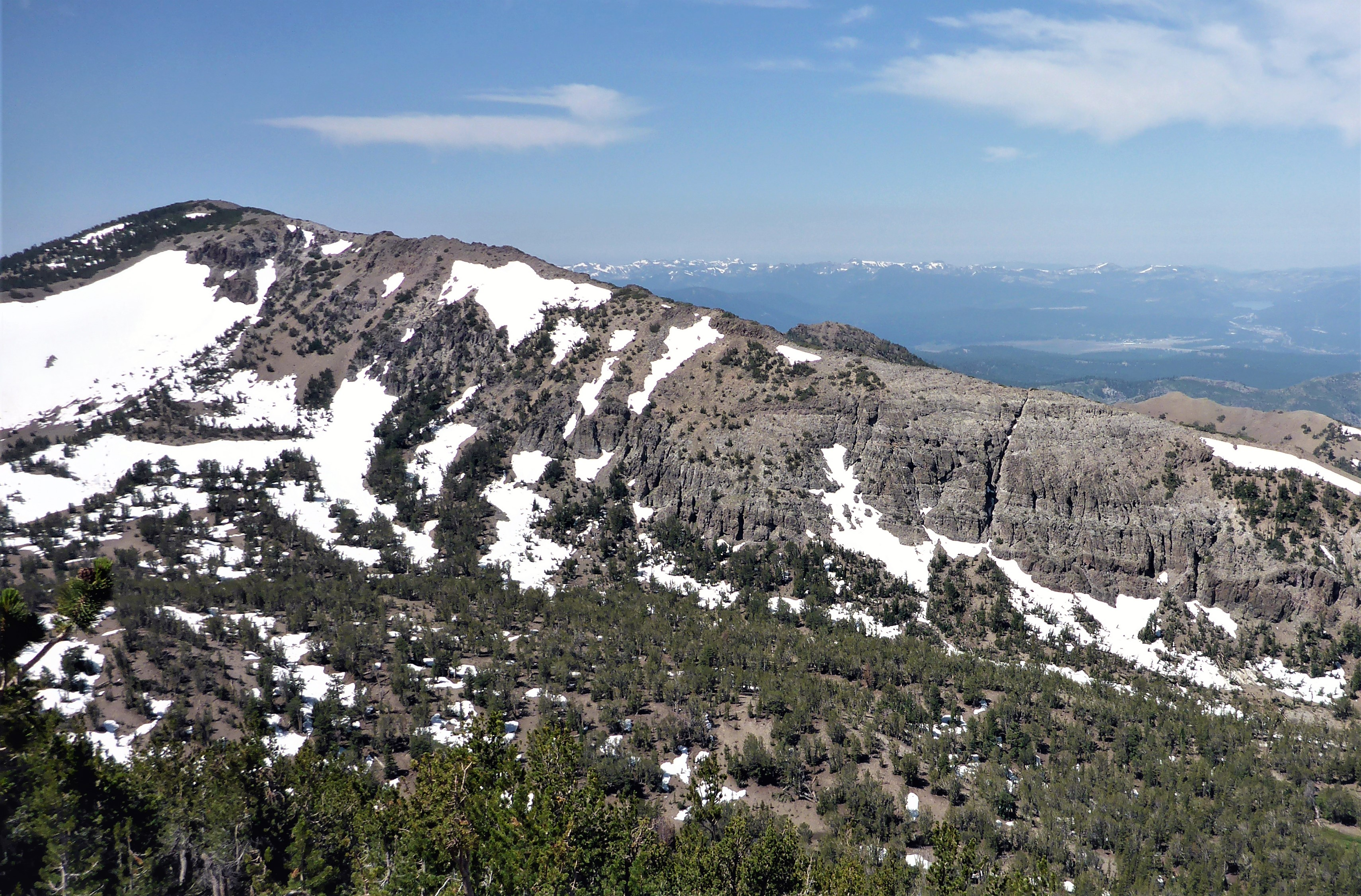
Mt. Houghton and north ridge

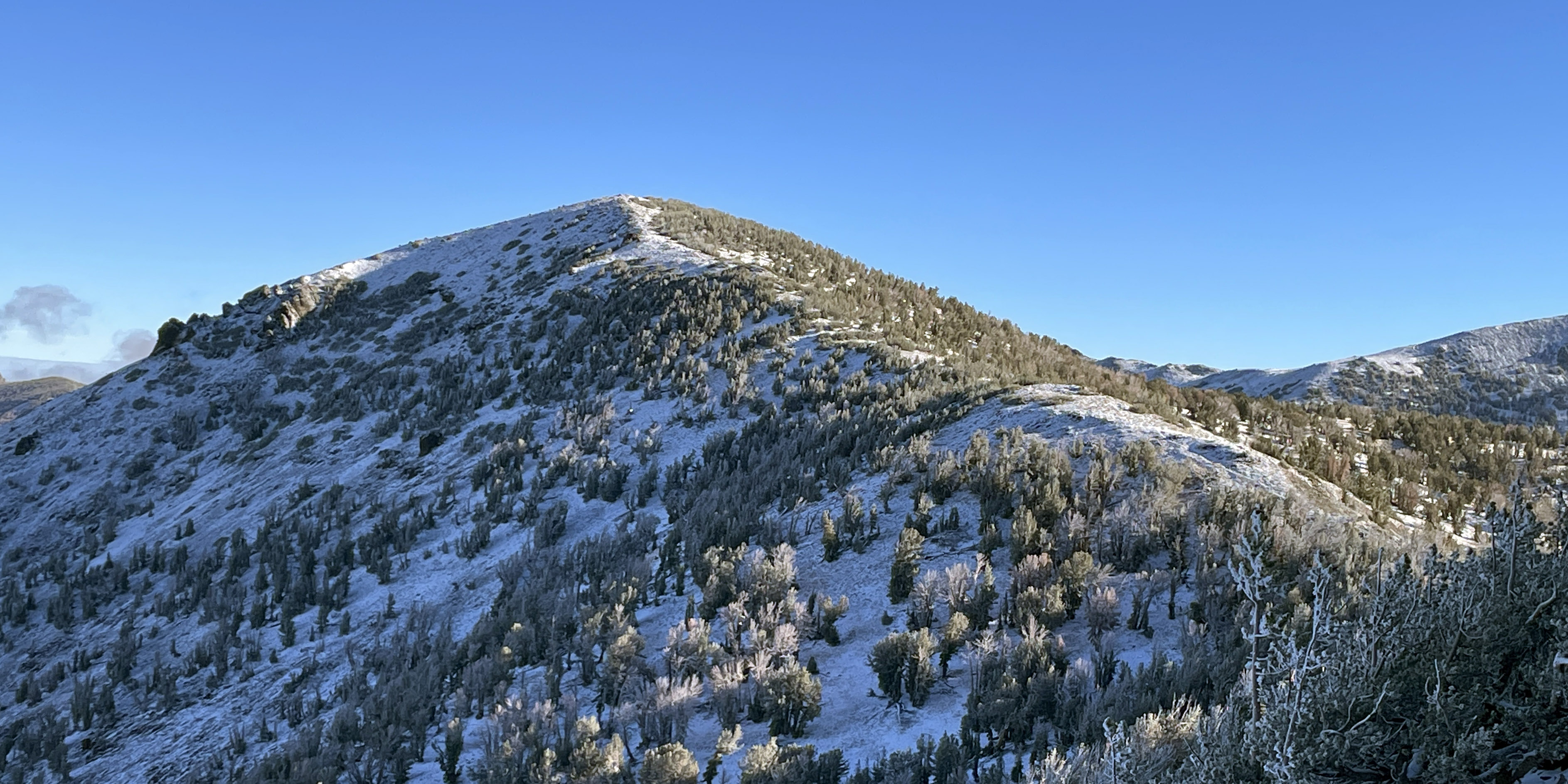
Mount Houghton from Relay Ridge
