= Phipps Peak =

Mountain in the American state of California

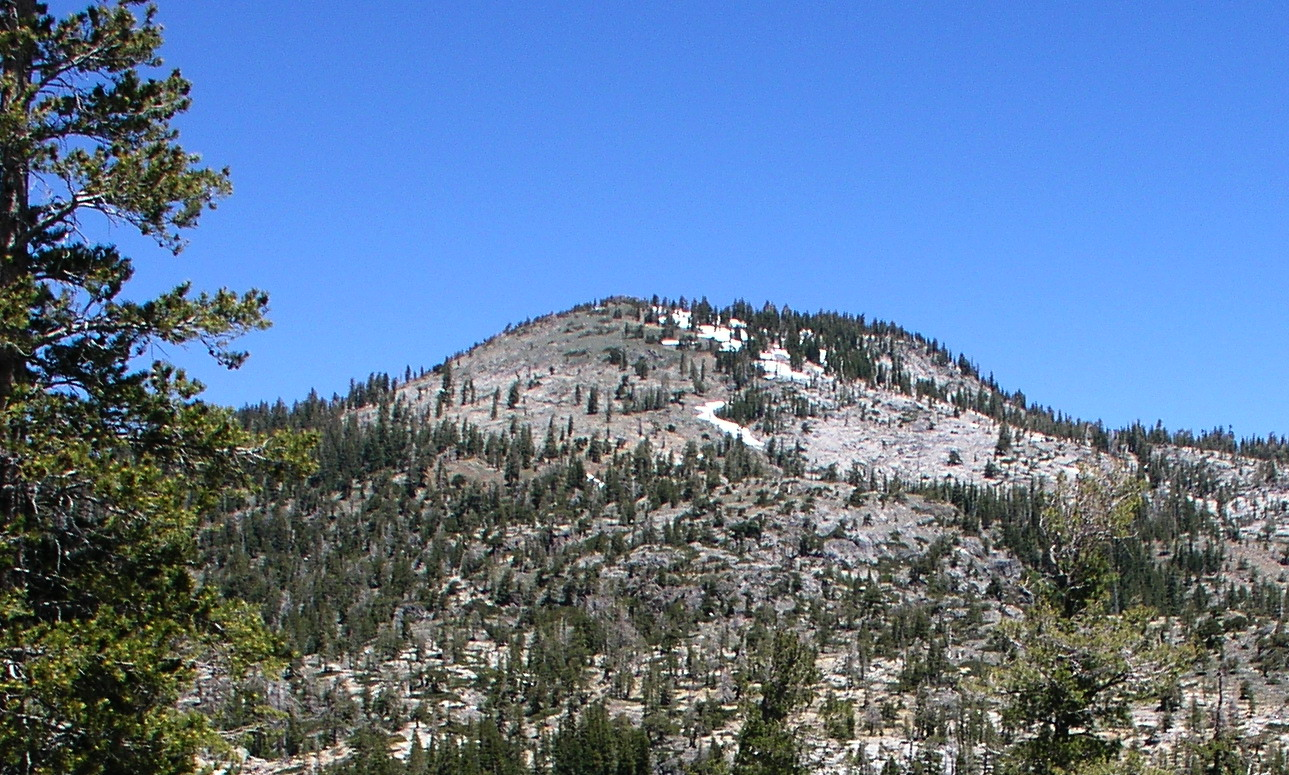

Highest point
- Elevation: 9,238 ft (2,816 m) NAVD 88
- Prominence: 434 ft (132 m)
- Listing: Tahoe OGUL mountaineer peak
- Coordinates: 38°57′16″N 120°08′59″W

Geography
- Location within California
- Location: El Dorado County, California, U.S.
- Parent range: Sierra Nevada
- Topo map: USGS Rockbound Valley

Climbing
- Easiest route: Easy scramble, class 2

Phipps Peak is a mountain in the Sierra Nevada to the west of Emerald Bay and Lake Tahoe; and to the east of Rockbound Valley and the Crystal Range. The peak is in El Dorado County, California and the Desolation Wilderness.

Phipps Peak is named after William Phipps, a California pioneer originally from Kentucky that fought in the American Army during the American Indian Wars. He claimed to be a "General" in the Army, though that was a self-proclaimed title. In 1854, he settled in the small settlement of Georgetown, California (named after George Phipps who is unrelated) about 100 miles west of Tahoe, and six years later relocated to McKinney Bay at Lake Tahoe where he settled on a 160-acre homestead near General Creek. Nearby Phipps Pass and General Creek are also named after Phipps.
