= Maggies Peaks =

Mountain in the American state of California

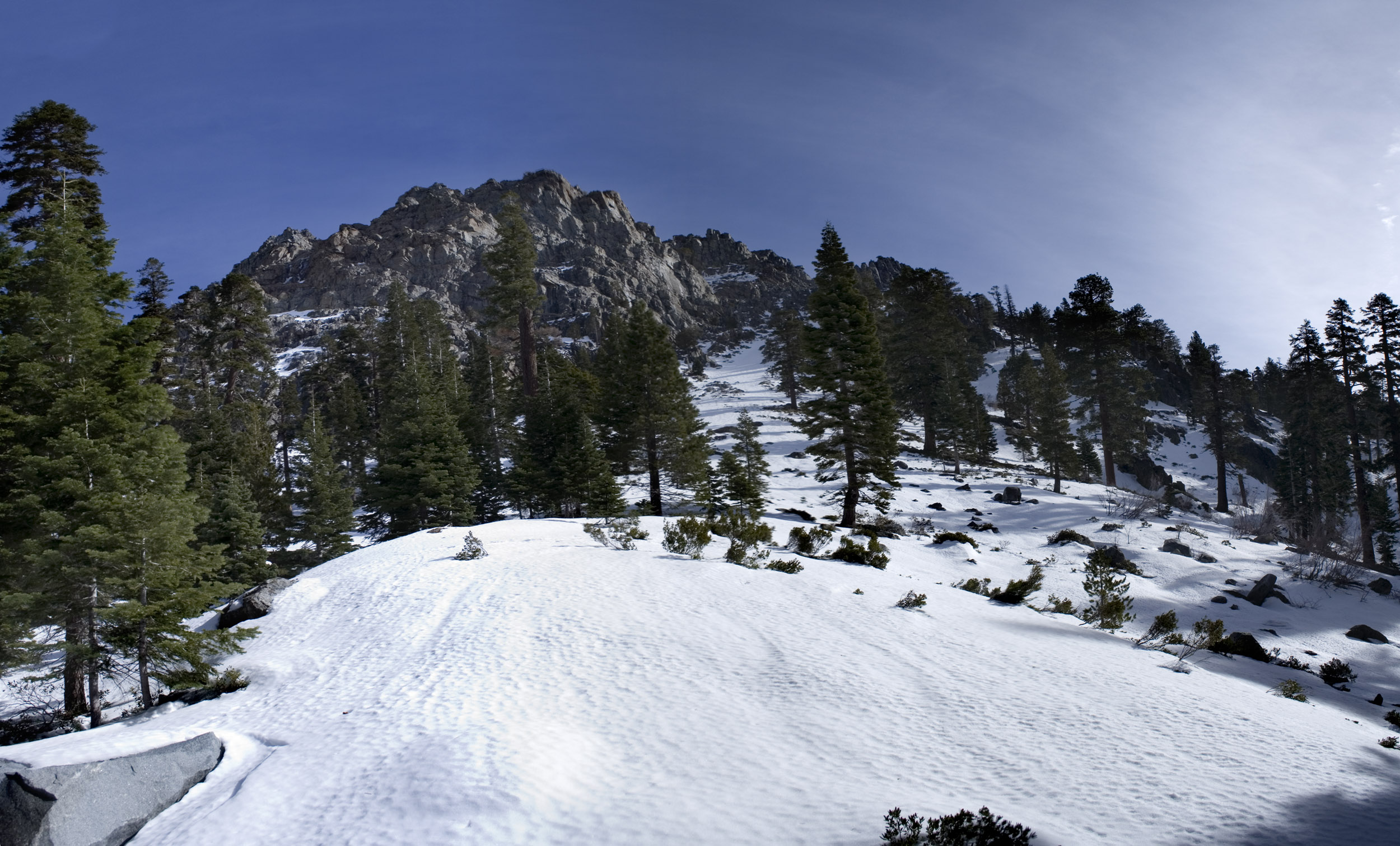
- Maggies Peaks as seen from the south

Highest point
- Peak: Maggies Peaks (South)
- Elevation: 8,703 ft (2,653 m) NAVD 88
- Prominence: 579 ft (176 m)
- Coordinates: 38°55′54″N 120°06′50″W

Geography
- Location: El Dorado County, California, U.S.
- Parent range: Sierra Nevada
- Topo map: USGS Emerald Bay

Climbing
- Easiest route: class 1-2

Maggies Peaks refers to a mountain in the Sierra Nevada mountain range, southwest of Lake Tahoe. There are two peaks on the mountain about 0.7 miles (1 km) apart. The northern peak has an elevation of about 8,499 feet (2,590 m) and the southern peak has an elevation of 8,703 feet (2,653 m). The mountain is located in the Desolation Wilderness in El Dorado County, California. The summits overlook Lake Tahoe and affords very good views of the lake.
