= Rubicon Peak =

Mountain in El Dorado County, California, US

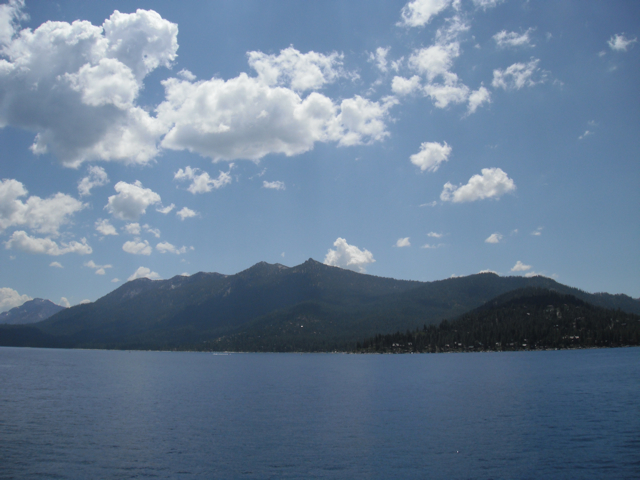
- Rubicon Bay and Peak from Lake Tahoe

Highest point
- Elevation: 9,187 ft (2,800 m) NAVD 88
- Listing: Tahoe OGUL Emblem Peak
- Coordinates: 38°59′19″N 120°08′00″W

Geography
- Location within California
- Location: El Dorado County, California, U.S.
- Parent range: Sierra Nevada

Climbing
- Easiest route: Scramble, class 2

Rubicon Peak is a mountain in the Sierra Nevada mountain range to the west of Lake Tahoe in the Desolation Wilderness in El Dorado County, California.
