= Mount Rose Wilderness =

Wilderness area in Nevada, United States

Mt. Rose Wilderness
- IUCN category Ib (wilderness area)
- Location within the United States
- Location: Washoe County, Nevada USA
- Nearest city: Reno, NV
- Coordinates: 39°21′00″N 119°55′00″W
- Governing body: U.S. Forest Service

The Mt. Rose Wilderness is a protected wilderness area in the Carson Range of Washoe County, in the northwestern U.S. state of Nevada. It is located between Lake Tahoe and Reno, Nevada.

The Mt. Rose Wilderness, including Mount Rose, covers an area of approximately 31,223 acres (12,635 ha), and is administered by the Humboldt-Toiyabe National Forest. The area was protected in 1989.

Mount Rose Wilderness has been home to the Washoe Tribe for over 400 generations. It is an ecological transition and is in between the Sierra Nevada's Carson Range and the Great Basin. There are different plants native to both regions. The elevation of the protected area is from 5,800 feet (1,800 m) in West Reno to 10,776 feet (3,285 m) at the peak of Mount Rose.

== See also ==
- Mount Rose Weather Observatory
- Nevada Wilderness Areas
- List of wilderness areas in Nevada
- Mount Houghton
- Relay Peak
