= Jakes Peak =

Mountain in the state of California

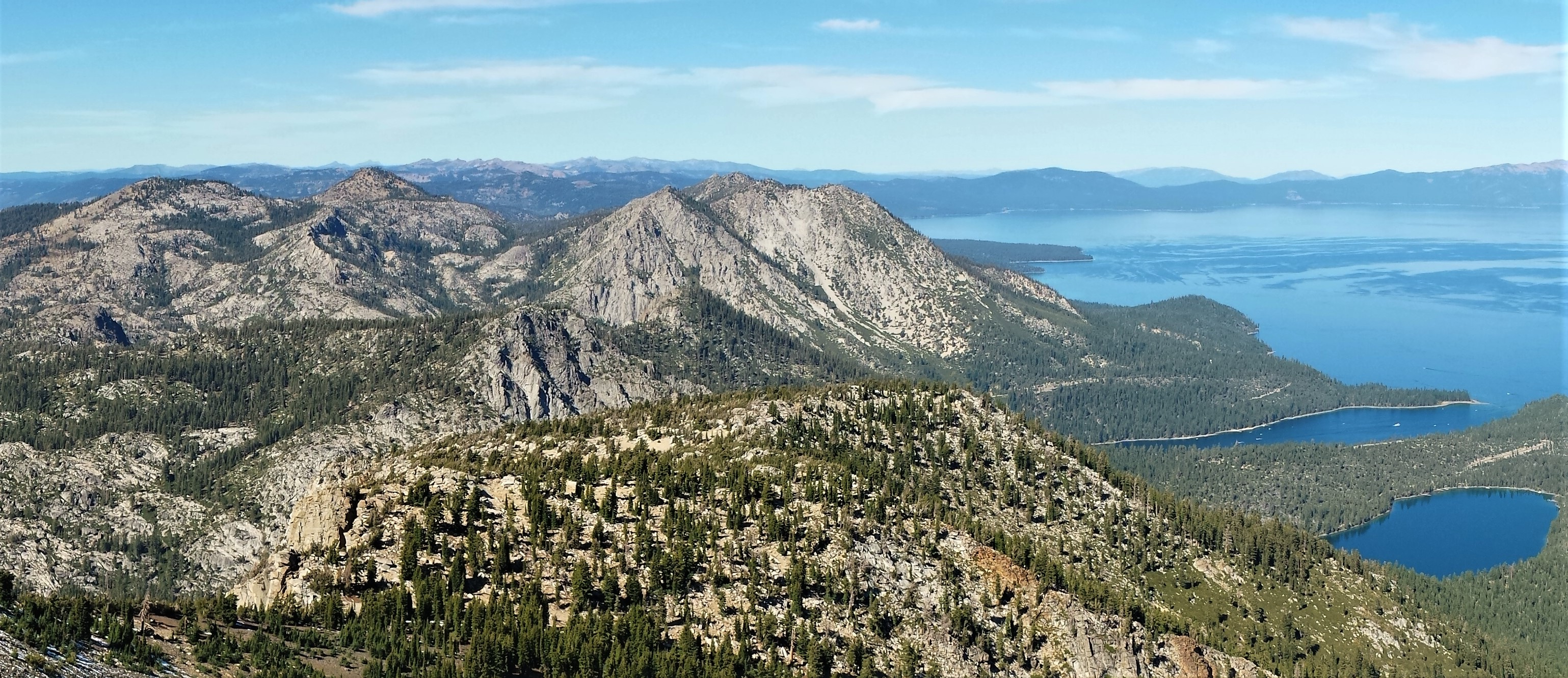
- South aspect centered, from Mt. Tallac

Highest point
- Elevation: 9,187 ft (2,800 m)
- Prominence: 227 ft (69 m)
- Parent peak: Peak 9269
- Isolation: 1.01 mi (1.63 km)
- Coordinates: 38°58′12″N 120°07′21″W

Naming
- Etymology: Jeffery "Jake" Smith

Geography
- Location within California Location within the United States
- Location: El Dorado County, California, U.S.
- Parent range: Sierra Nevada
- Topo map: USGS Emerald Bay

Climbing
- Easiest route: class 4

Jakes Peak is a 9,187-foot-elevation (2,800-meter) mountain summit located in the Sierra Nevada mountain range in El Dorado County, California, United States. It is set within the Desolation Wilderness, on land managed by Eldorado National Forest. This iconic peak is situated above the southwest shore of Lake Tahoe, and approximately seven miles (11 km) northwest of the community of South Lake Tahoe. Topographic relief is significant as the east aspect rises 2,950 feet (900 meters) above the lake in 1.5 miles (2.4 km).

== Etymology ==
This mountain's name remembers ski patroller Jeffery James Smith (1954–1982), commonly known as "Jake", and in honor of the other six persons who also died in an avalanche at the Alpine Meadows Ski Area on March 31, 1982. This landform's toponym was officially adopted in 1985 by the U.S. Board on Geographic Names.

== Climate ==
According to the Köppen climate classification system, Jakes Peak is located in an alpine climate zone. Most weather fronts originate in the Pacific Ocean, and travel east toward the Sierra Nevada mountains. As fronts approach, they are forced upward by the peaks (orographic lift), causing them to drop their moisture in the form of rain or snowfall onto the range. Precipitation runoff from the mountain drains to Lake Tahoe.

== Gallery ==
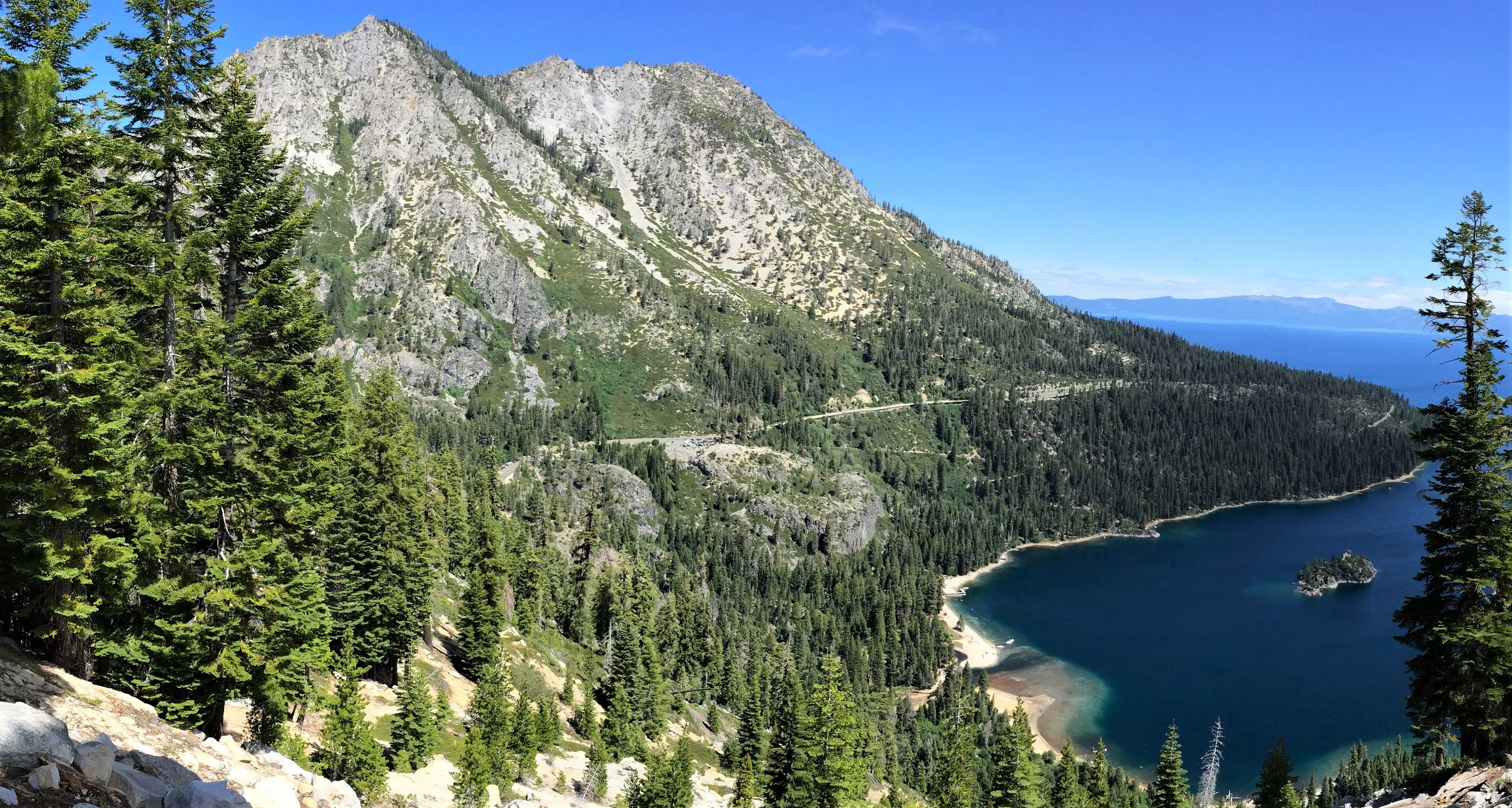
Southeast aspect above Emerald Bay

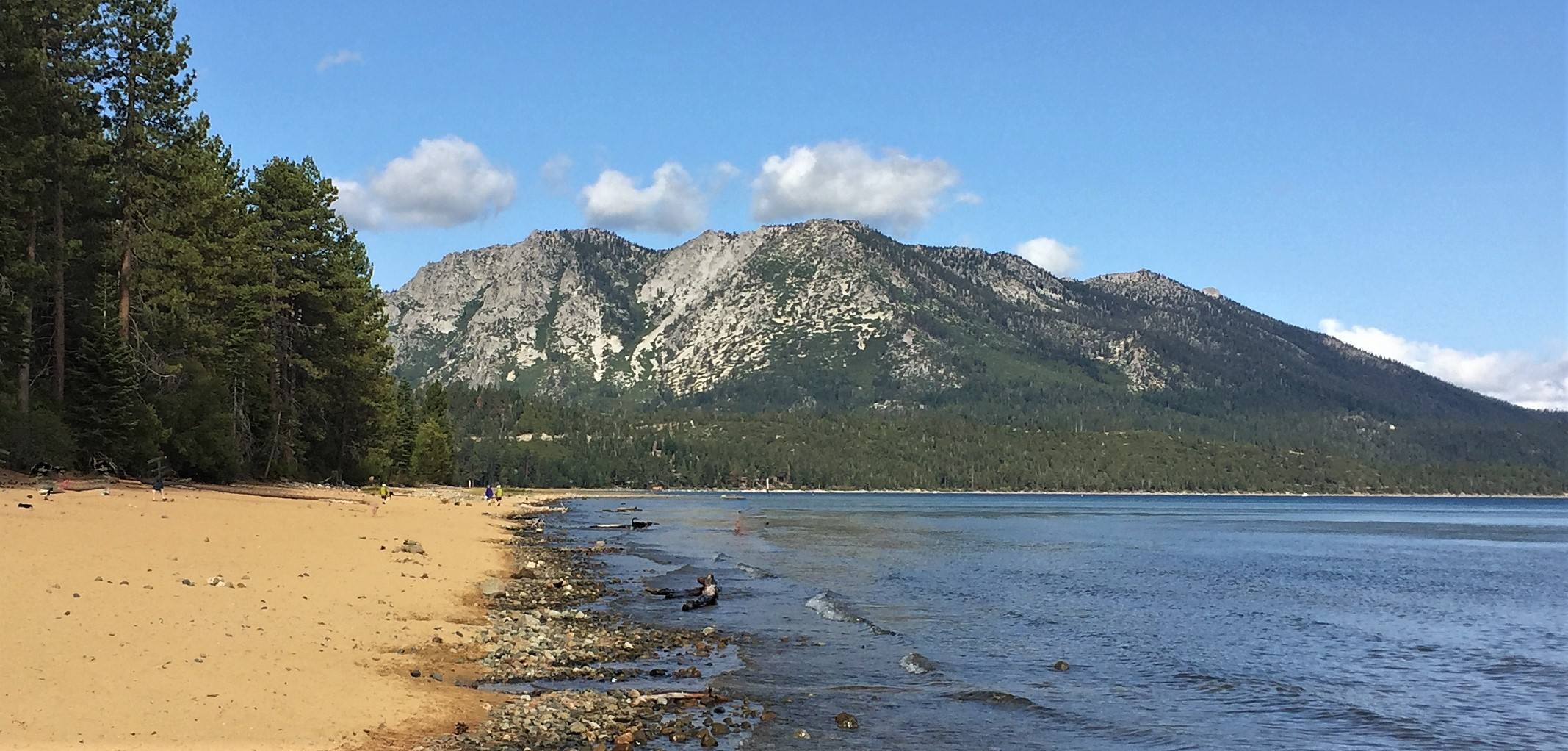
Southeast aspect from Kiva Beach

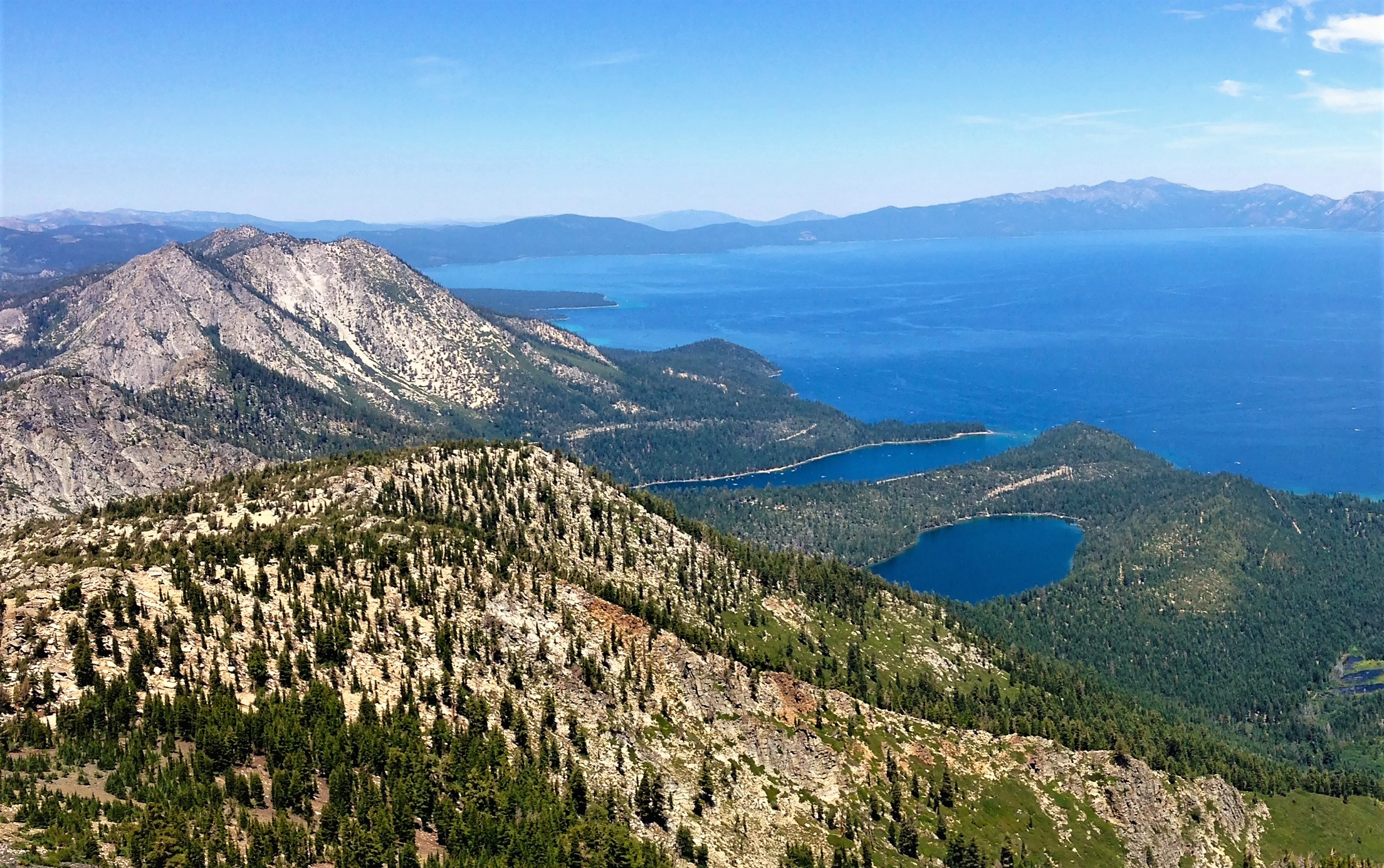
Jakes Peak (left) and Lake Tahoe from Mount Tallac

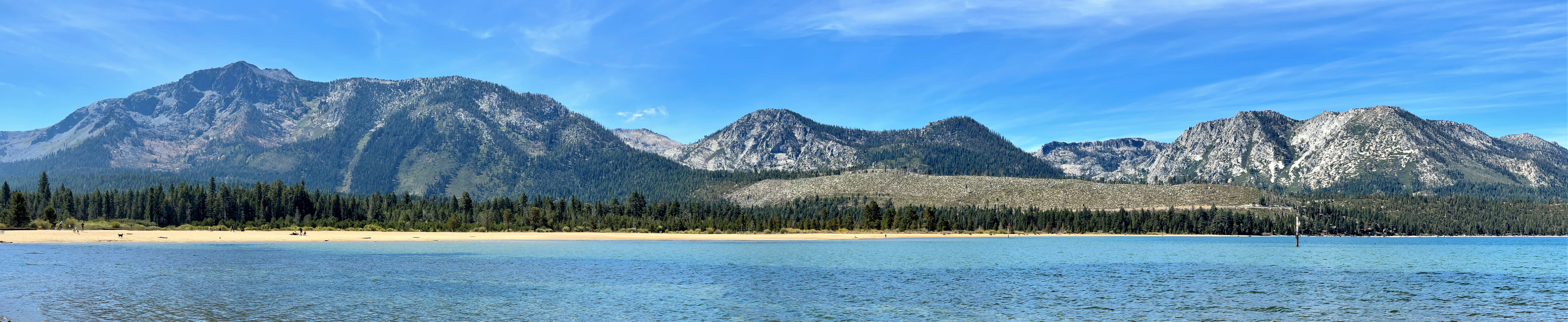
Mount Tallac (left), Maggies Peaks (center), Jakes Peak (right).

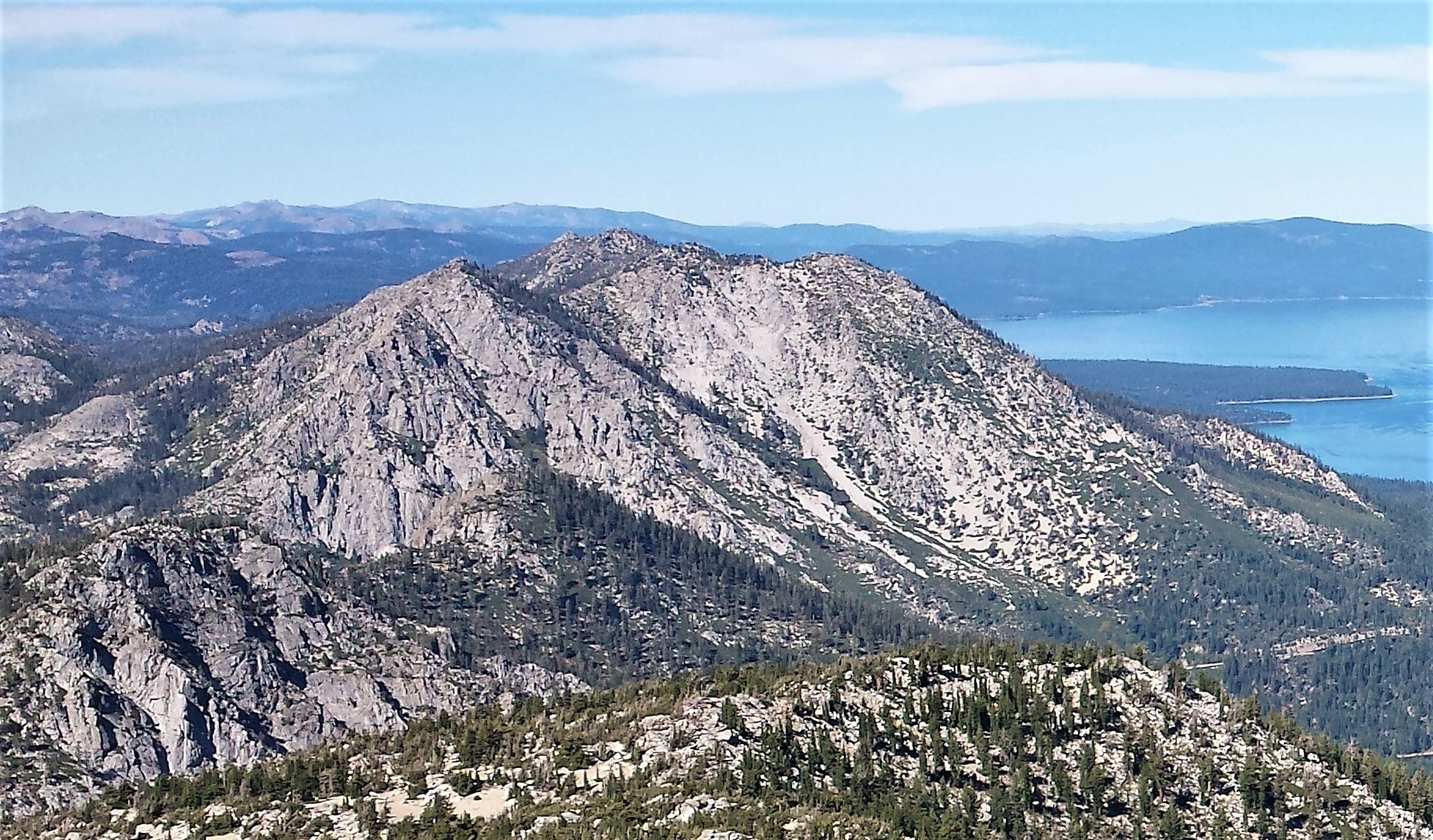
Jakes Peak seen from Mount Tallac

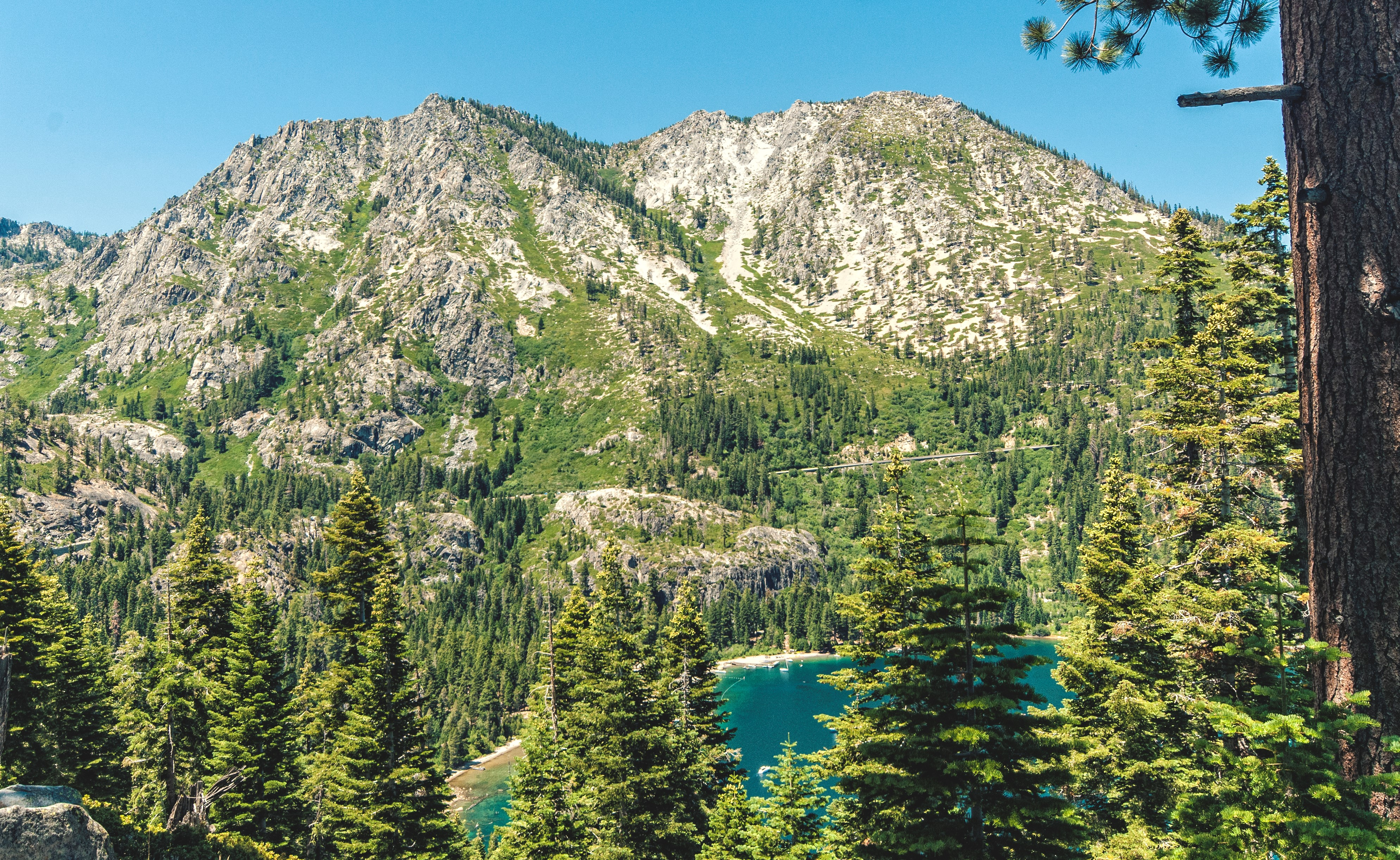
Southeast aspect

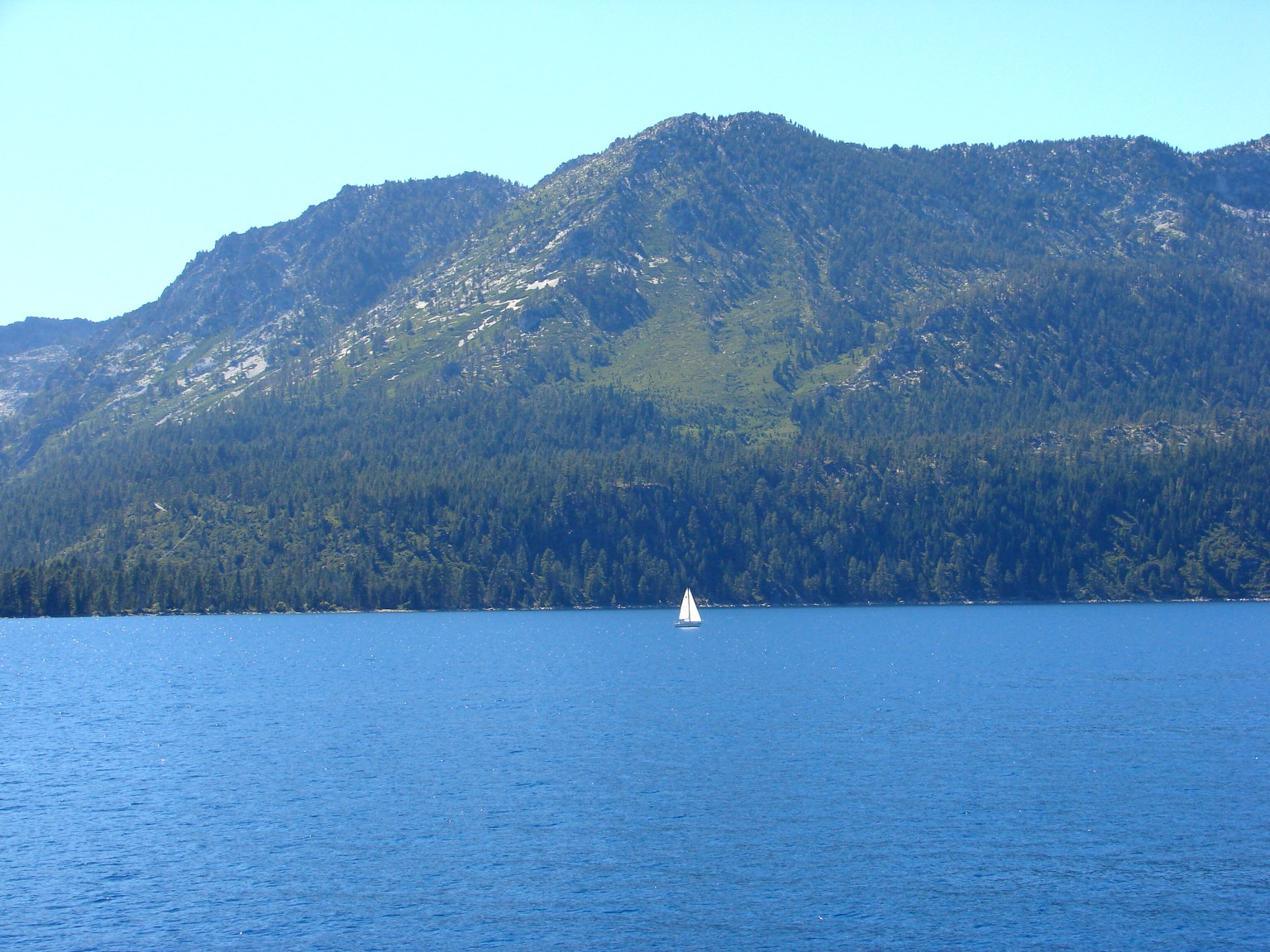
Northeast aspect

== See also ==
- Desolation Wilderness
