= Relay Peak =

Mountain in Nevada, United States

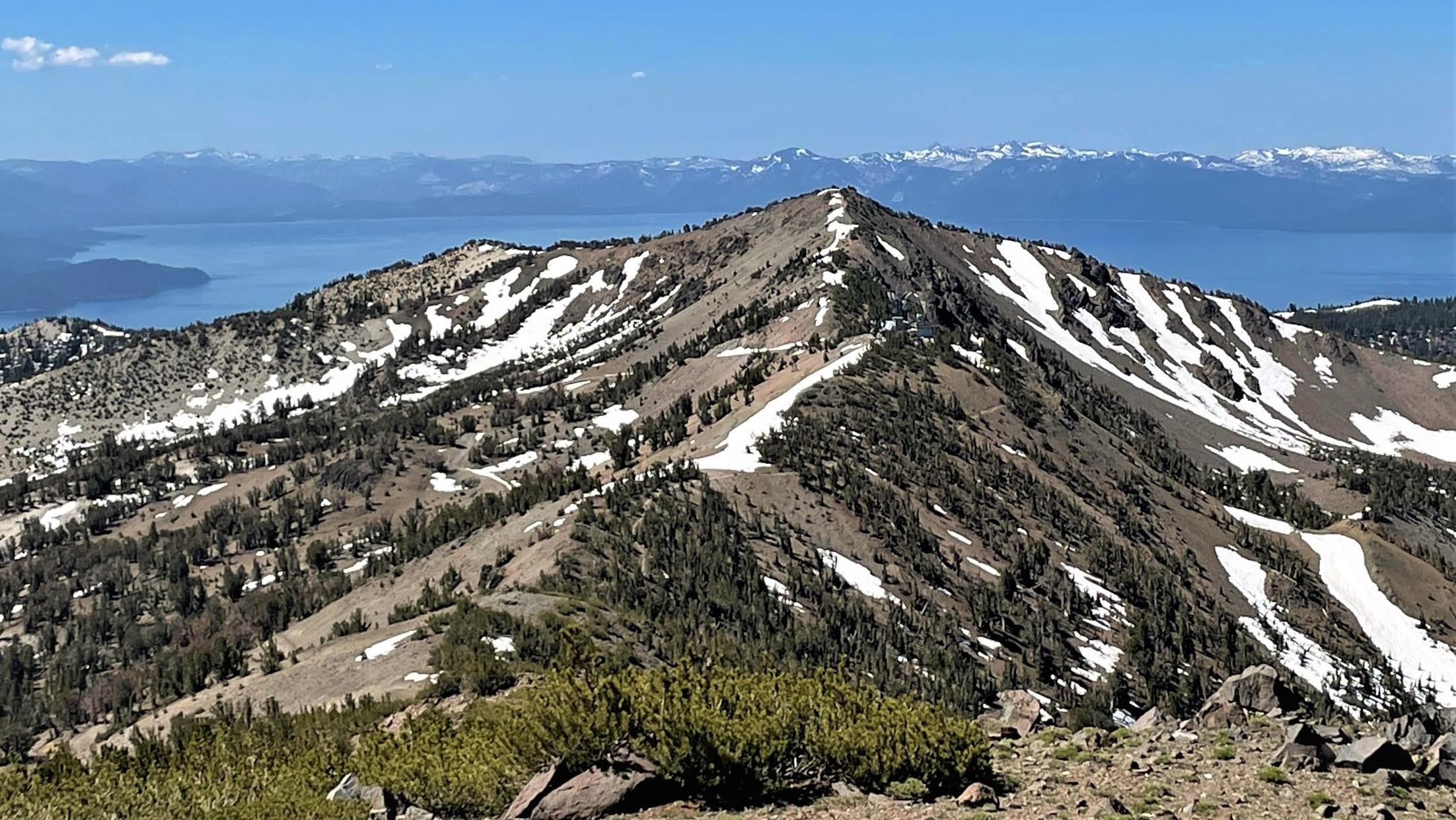
- North aspect, from Mt. Houghton

Highest point
- Elevation: 10,338 ft (3,151 m)
- Prominence: 296 ft (90 m)
- Parent peak: Mount Houghton (10,490 ft)
- Isolation: 1.35 mi (2.17 km)
- Coordinates: 39°18′55″N 119°56′49″W

Geography
- Location within Nevada Location within the United States
- Location: Mount Rose Wilderness
- Country: United States of America
- State: Nevada
- County: Washoe
- Parent range: Sierra Nevada; Carson Range
- Topo map: USGS Mount Rose

Climbing
- Easiest route: Hiking trail

Relay Peak is a 10,338-foot (3,151 m) mountain summit located in Washoe County, Nevada, United States.

== Description ==
Relay Peak is set five miles north of Lake Tahoe in the Mount Rose Wilderness, on land managed by the Humboldt-Toiyabe National Forest. It is part of the Carson Range which is a subset of the Sierra Nevada. It is situated 2.5 miles (4.0 km) southwest of Mount Rose and four miles (6.4 km) north of Incline Village. Topographic relief is modest as the summit rises 1,420 feet (430 meters) above Ginny Lake in one mile, and 2,000 feet (610 meters) above Incline Lake in two miles. The Tahoe Rim Trail traverses the summit of the peak, providing an approach option, and the summit represents the highest point anywhere along the entire 170 mile trail. This landform's toponym was officially adopted in 1990 by the U.S. Board on Geographic Names.

== Climate ==
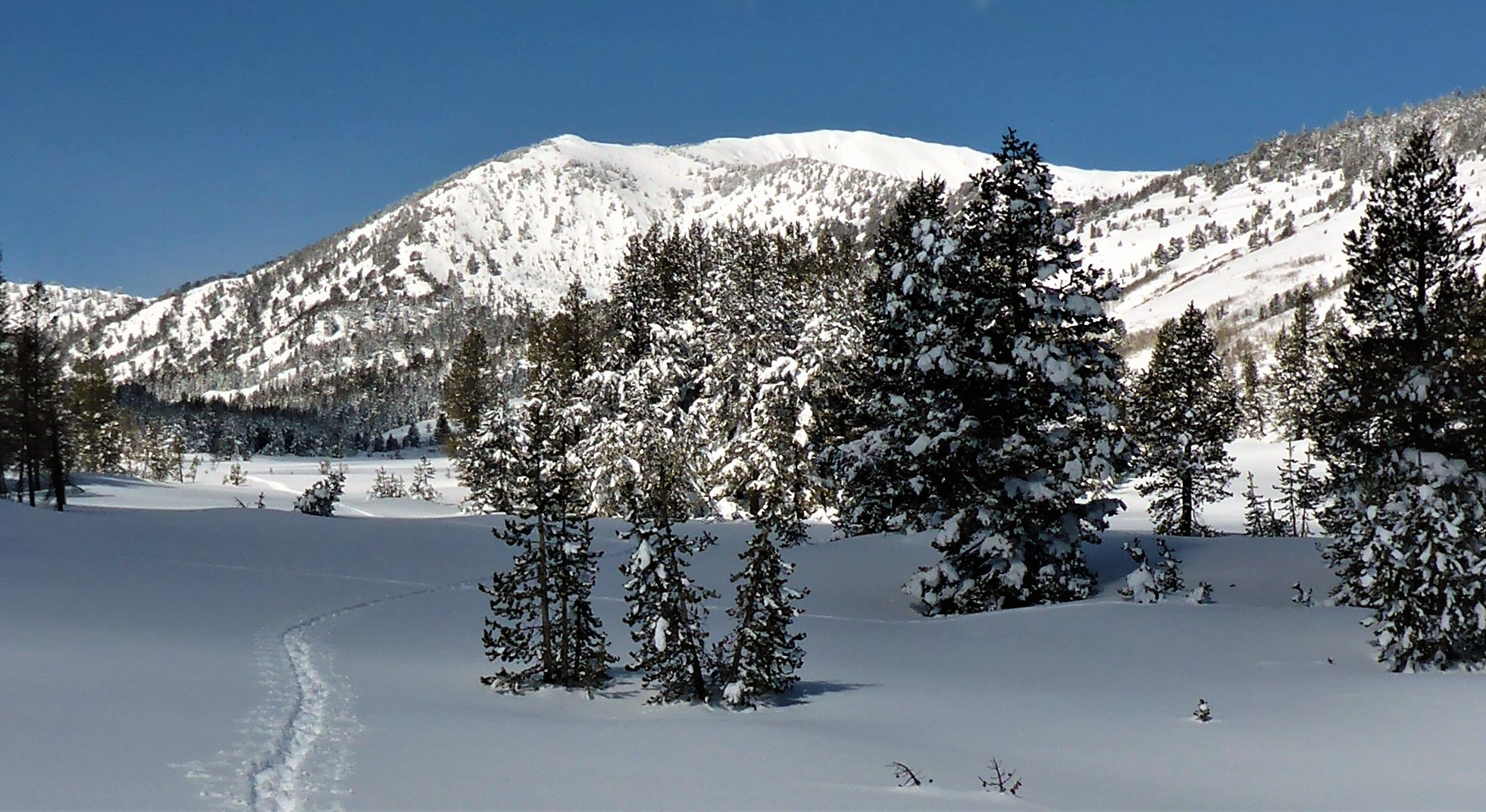
Relay Peak in winter, from the southeast at Tahoe Meadows

According to the Köppen climate classification system, Relay Peak is located in an alpine climate zone. Most weather fronts originate in the Pacific Ocean, and travel east toward the Sierra Nevada mountains. As fronts approach, they are forced upward by the peaks (orographic lift), causing them to drop their moisture in the form of rain or snowfall onto the range.

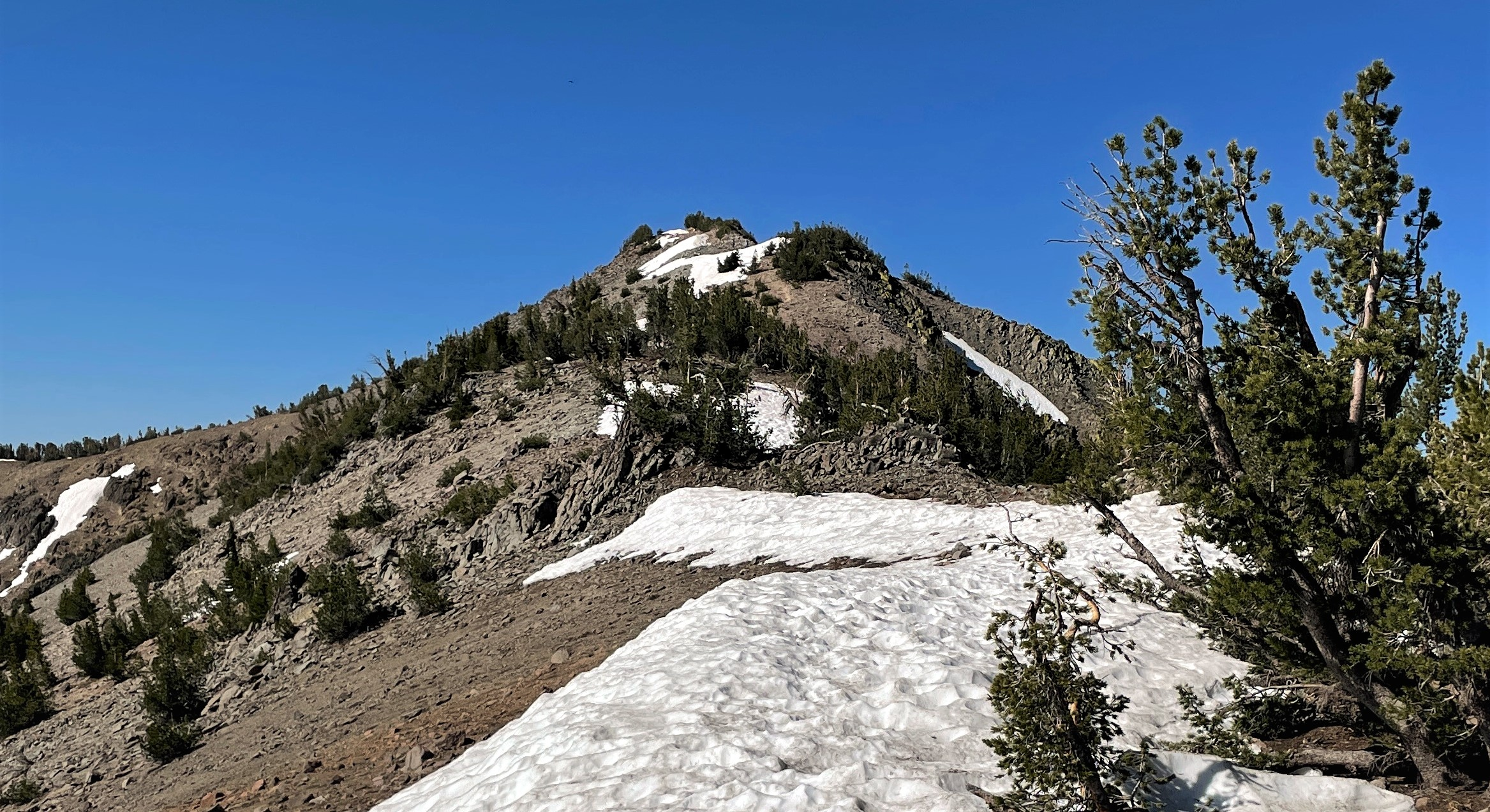
Relay Peak, north aspect

== See also ==
- List of Lake Tahoe peaks
