= Skylands Region =

Region of New Jersey, US

Coordinates: 40.6931°N 74.8663°W

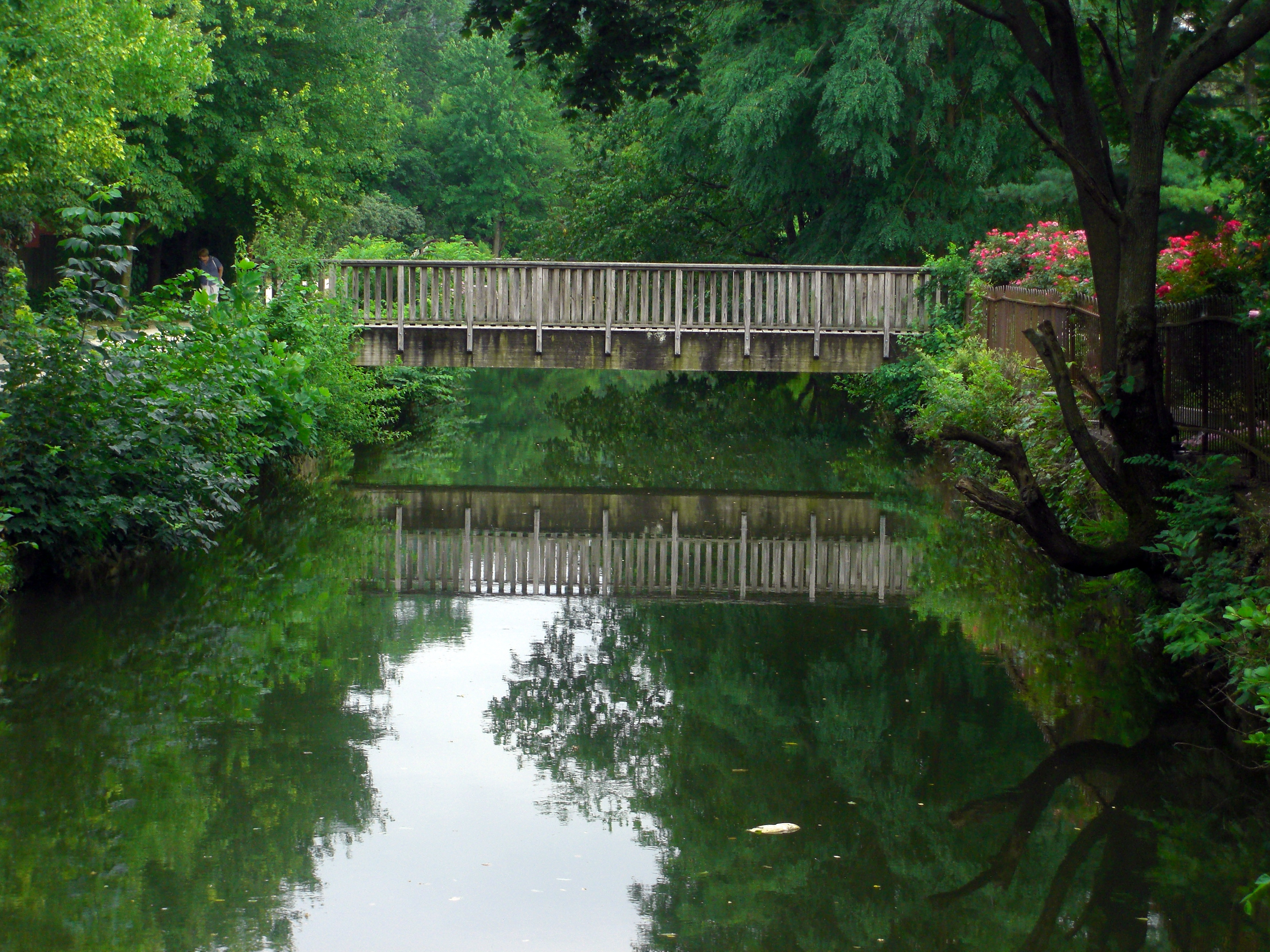
The Delaware and Raritan Canal in Lambertville

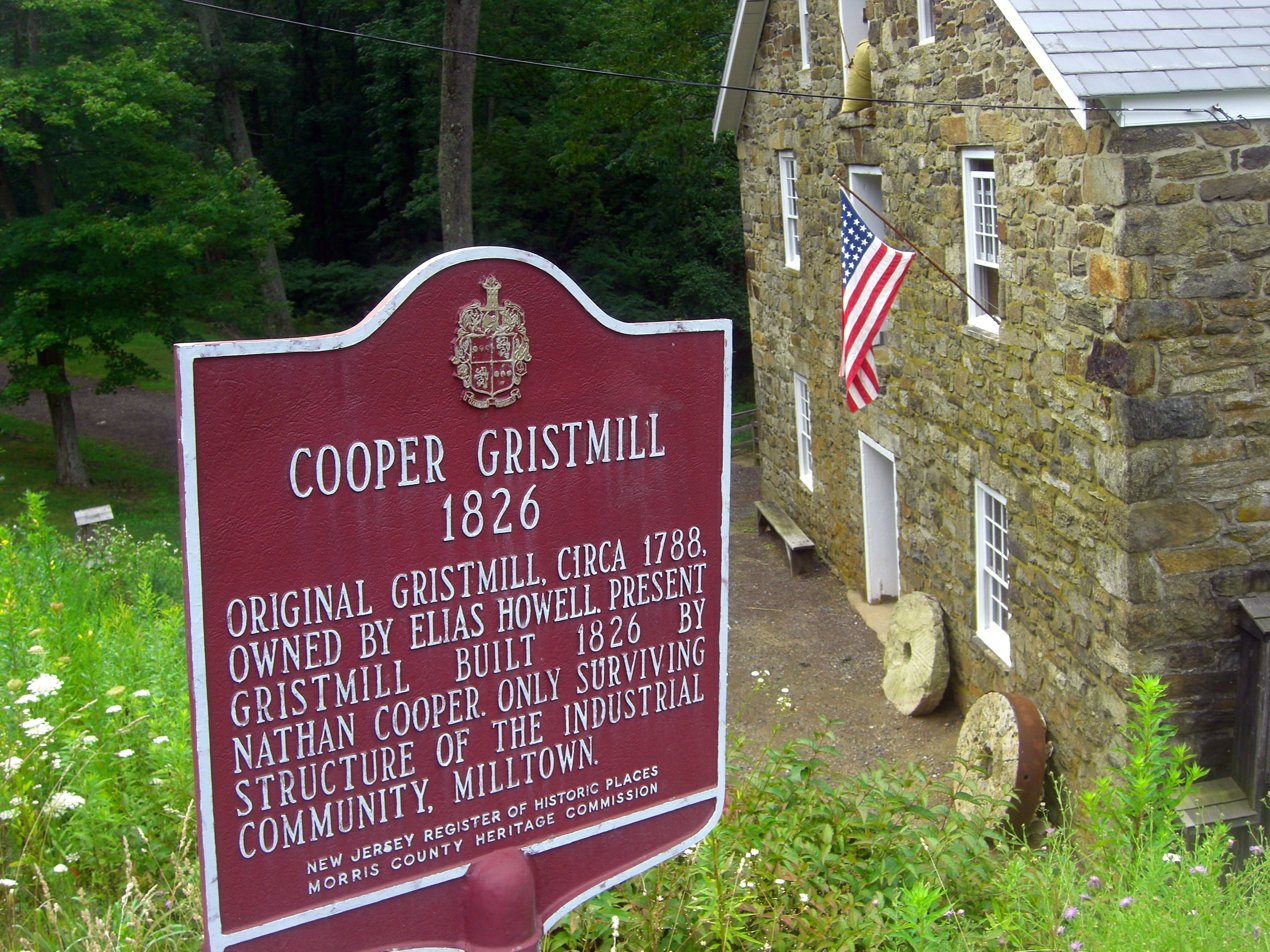
The Cooper Mill in Chester Township

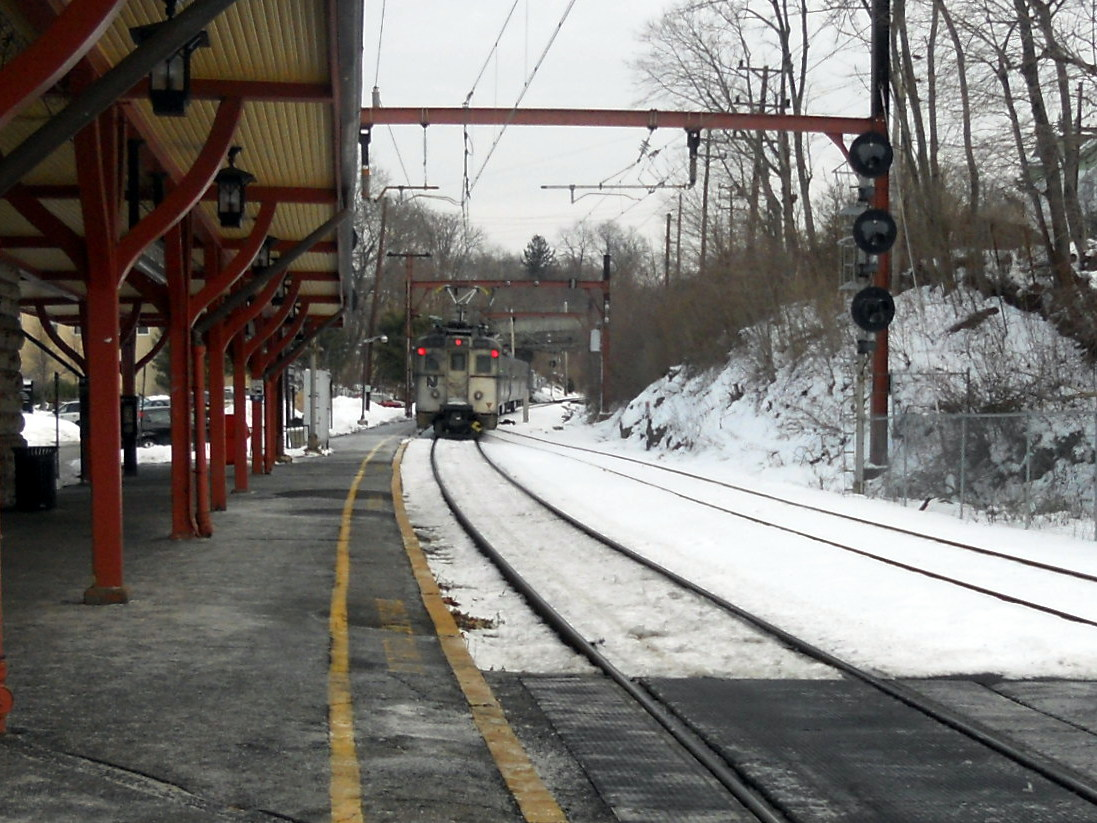
Bernardsville station in Somerset County

The Skylands Region (simply known as Skylands) is a region of New Jersey located in the north-west parts of the state. It is one of seven tourism regions established by the New Jersey State Department of Tourism; the others are Gateway Region, Greater Atlantic City Region, the Southern Shore Region, the Delaware River Region, the Shore Region, and the Central Jersey Region.

The Skylands Region officially encompasses Morris, Sussex, Warren, Hunterdon and Somerset counties. The area features uplifted land, rolling hills and mountainous characteristics of North Jersey. The region contains 60,000 acres (240 km^{2}) of state parkland and a diverse geography filled with lakes, rivers, and picturesque hills, known for its protected water resources and farmland. Development in this expanded definition is tightly regulated.

== Climate ==
This region is considered by Köppen to be Humid Continental (Dfb).

== Places and events ==
- Allamuchy Freight House
- Allamuchy Mountain State Park
- Central Railroad of New Jersey main line
- Columbia Trail
- Delaware Water Gap and Delaware Water Gap National Recreation Area (on New Jersey side of Pennsylvania-New Jersey border)
- Duke Farms
- Great Swamp National Wildlife Refuge
- Hacklebarney State Park
- High Point State Park
- High Point
- Hopatcong State Park
- Jenny Jump State Forest
- Jenny Jump Mountain
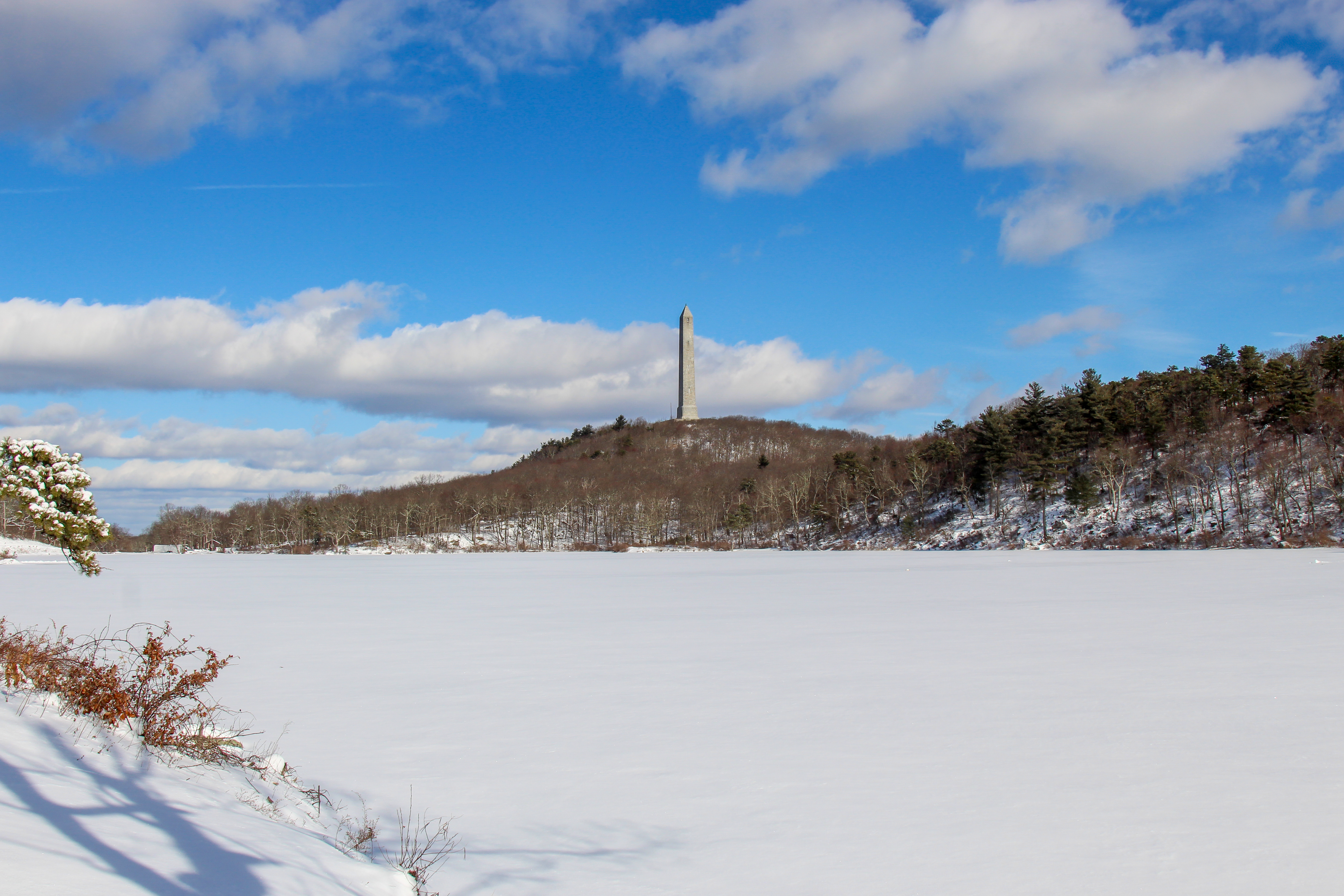
- High Point State Park in Sussex County
  Land of Make Believe
- Kittatinny Mountain
- Kittatinny Valley State Park
- Lackawanna Cut-Off
- Lake Hopatcong
- Lake Musconetcong
- Lehigh Line
- Musconetcong Mountain
- Mountain Creek Waterpark
- Musconetcong River
- Musconetcong Tunnel
- New Jersey State Fair
- Red Mill
- Ringwood Manor
- Ringwood State Park
- Round Valley Reservoir
- Space Farms Zoo and Museum
- Spruce Run Recreation Area
- Stokes State Forest
  - Sussex Branch Rail Trail
- Swartswood State Park
- The Sourlands
- Sourland Mountain
  - Sourland Mountain Preserve
- Wallkill River
- Wallkill River National Wildlife Refuge
- Waterloo Village, New Jersey
- Wild West City
- Schooley's Mountain
- Skylands estate
- Somerset Patriots/TD Bank Ballpark
- Sussex County Miners/Skylands Stadium
- Voorhees State Park

== See also ==
- Ridge-and-Valley Appalachians
- New York-New Jersey Highlands
- Piedmont
