= Sourland Conservancy =

- Formation: 1986; 40 years ago
- Founder: Robert Garrett
- Type: Nonprofit
- Tax ID no.: 22-3707157
- Headquarters: Hopewell, New Jersey
- Region served: The Sourlands
- Executive Director: Laurie Cleveland
- Website: https://sourland.org/
- Formerly called: Sourland Regional Citizens Planning Council

The Sourland Conservancy is a non-governmental, not-for-profit 501(c)(3) organization with a mission to protect, promote and preserve The Sourlands, a region encompassing Sourland Mountain in central New Jersey.

The organization is currently headquartered at a historic property in Skillman, NJ, in partnership with the Stoutsburg Sourland African American Museum.

One of the threats that the Sourland region is facing is tree loss due to the Emerald ash borer. In 2021 the conservancy was involved in a project that planted ten thousand trees in The Sourlands. Another ten thousand trees were planted in 2022, bringing the total to over 25,000 trees planted over 3 years.

== History ==
The organization was founded in 1986 by a group of local residents concerned about unsustainable development pressures. Originally called The Sourland Regional Citizens Planning Council, in 2013 it was renamed to Sourland Conservancy.
