= The Sourlands =

Region of New Jersey, United States

Coordinates: 40.412680°N 74.802361°W

Boardwalk in the Sourland Mountain Preserve

The Sourlands is a region in the central portion of the U.S. state of New Jersey that includes portions of Hunterdon County, Mercer County, and Somerset County. It is centered on Sourland Mountain and comprises parts of Lambertville, East Amwell, West Amwell, Hillsborough, Hopewell Boro, Hopewell Township, and Montgomery Township. The region is flanked by the Hopewell Fault to the south and Amwell Valley to the north that runs from Mount Airy to an area just west of Flagtown and a diabase formation running from Lambertville to Mount Airy. The Sourland also include a hilly area towards the southwest called Pleasant Valley, with a number of farms. Although much of the Sourlands is not conducive to farming, Pleasant Valley and the slopes on the surrounding ridges have a number of farms. The slopes of the ridge to the north are also home to Unionville Vineyard.

== Ridges ==
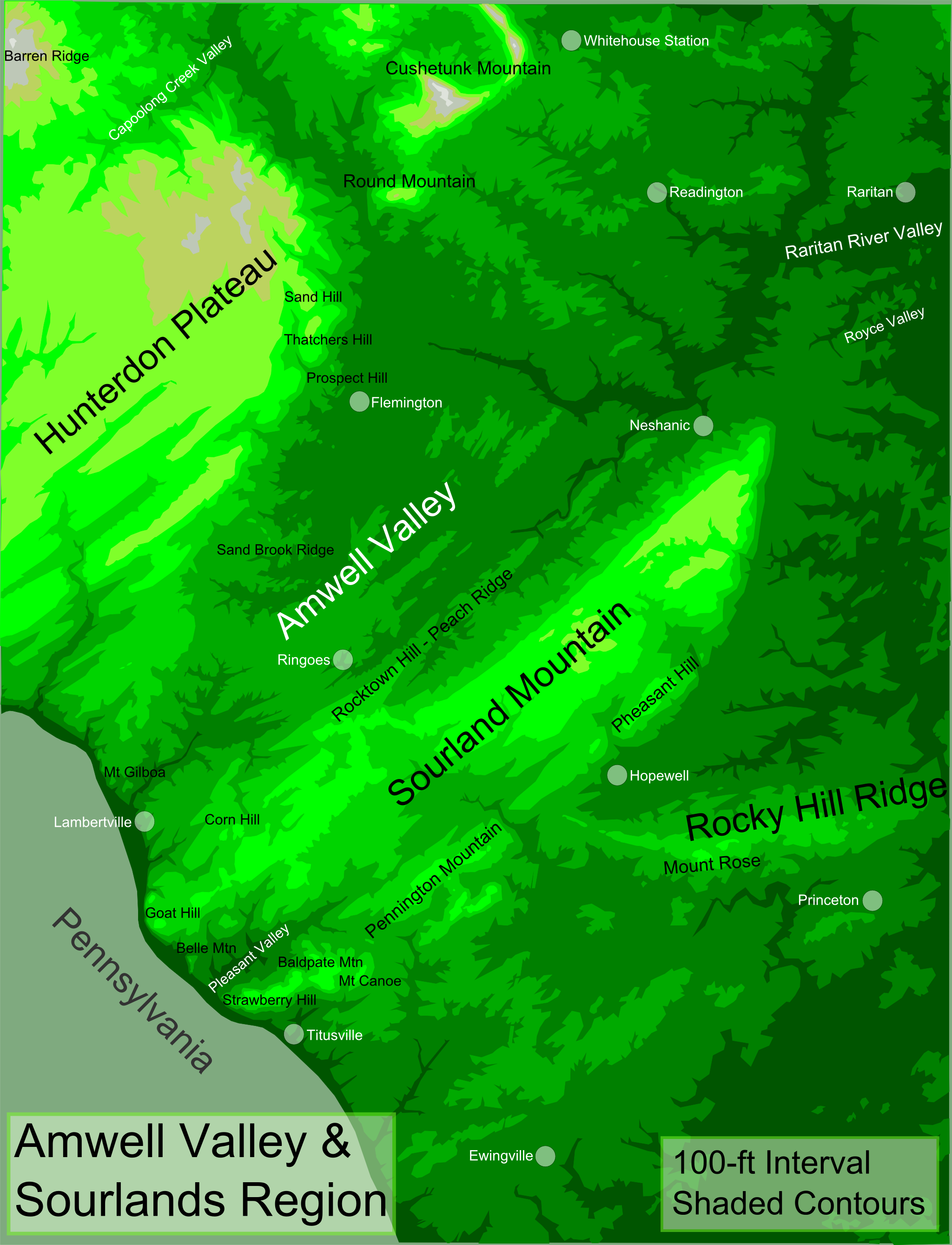
Topographic map depicting the greater Amwell Valley-Sourlands region.

- Baldpate Mountain - Southernmost ridge, near the Delaware River and southwest of Pennington Mountain
- Belle Mountain - an isolated trap rock hill between Sourland Mountain and Baldpate Mountain
- Peach Ridge or Rocktown Ridge - runs along Rocktown and Wertsville Roads
- Pennington Mountain - runs roughly from Bell Mountain to Stony Brook
- Pheasant Hill - a ridge running from Harbourton to Skillman southeast of Sourland Mountain
- Sourland Mountain - the main ridge in the region runs from Goat Hill on the Delaware to Fort Hans near Flagtown

== Towns and villages ==
- Hopewell, sits just below the southern ridge of the Sourlands
- Lambertville, sits where the Sourlands meet the Delaware. Numerous ferries existed at this spot as Old York Road avoided crossing Sourland Mountain.
- Mount Airy, sits along Old York Road and is still home to the Mt. Airy Church
- Wertsville, New Jersey or Wert's Corner, was a village that grew up at the crossroads of Manners Road and Lindbergh Road and Wertsville Road. It was named after Christopher Werts. The village had a tavern and later a hotel. It also had a church, school, store, post office, wagon shop, shoemaker shop. Peacock's General Store, once popular with bicyclists, burnt to the ground on the night of February 28, 2014.

== Former villages and hamlets ==
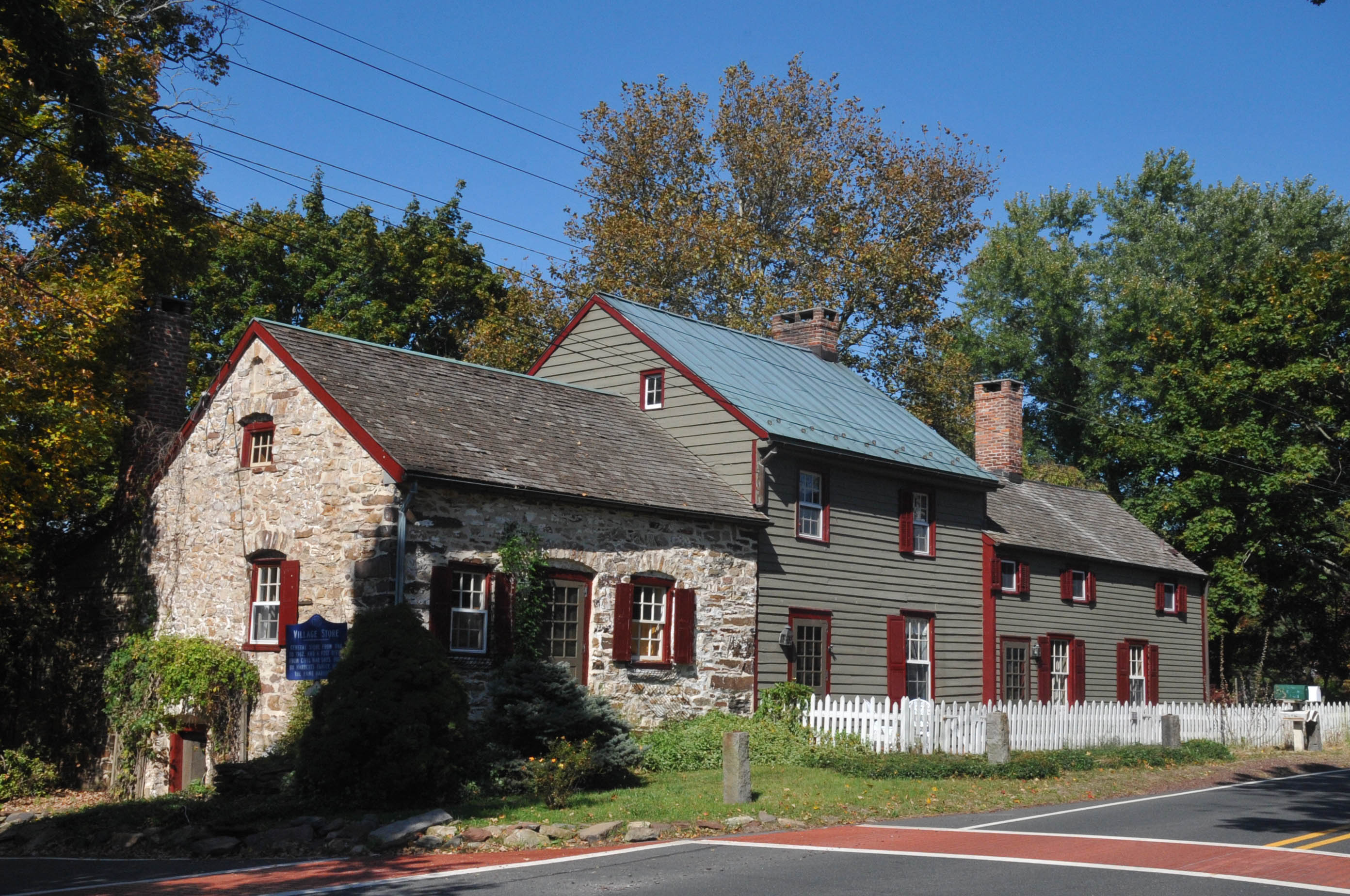
John Harbort's stone house in Harbourton

- Amwell, New Jersey, was a small hamlet, located on a tributary of Back Brook (now near the area between Rocktown Road and Rt. 31).
- Buttonwood Corners, New Jersey, named for the sycamore trees in the area, was located on Cedar Summit (at the corner of Zion and Lindberg Roads). The area extended from Burd Lane to South Hill Road and included houses, a tavern, the Mountain Grove School and Wyckoff's Peach farm.
- Furman's Corner, named after Samuel Furman, brother-in-law of John Hart, was located at North Hill Road and Werstville Road.
- Harbourton, New Jersey was a village named after John Harbort, whose stone home built in 1768 was used as a store, a hat factory, tavern and post office. Today the house still stands, but is a private residence. The village also had a church, wheelwright, blacksmith shops and a creamery. Johann Peter Rockefeller, who lived on a farmstead there is buried in a cemetery off of Rocktown-Lambertville Road.
- Minnietown, named for Minnie True, was an African American hamlet on Rileyville Road on the south side of Sourland Mountain. In the late 19th century, its residents were basketweavers for the Wyckoff Peach Farm. Today Hillbilly Hall Restaurant and Tavern and Minnietown Lane are all that exist there.
- Montgomery was a village named after Richard Montgomery at Wertsville and Montgomery Roads. A schoolhouse, blacksmith shop, and post office were here as well as the nearby mill on the Neshanic River (once called Verbryck's after Bernardus Verbryck and later called West's Mill).
- Moore's Station, New Jersey, was a hamlet that grew up along the Belvidere Delaware Railroad that disappeared with the abandonment of the railroad.
- New Market, likely named for the store that once was run there, was home to a tavern and sat to the west of Snydertown on Snydertown Road. It changed its name to Linvale when it required a post office in 1889, to distinguish it from New Market in Piscataway. Linvale was built near the Malayelick Trail.
- Rileyville, New Jersey, named for Patrick Riley (general store and applejack distillery owner), was located on Rileyville Road on the north side of the ridge. A church, a school and a store as well as number of residences existed there in the 19th century
- Rocktown, New Jersey was located near the Indian village, Wishelemensey on the Malayelick Trail. A stone house from 1739 is still standing there today. A school, a tavern and a store all existed there at some point. The village is located along Rocktown Hill Road.
- Snydertown, New Jersey, named after Jacob Snyder, was built around Snyder's grist mill over a tributary of Stony Creek (on Snydertown Road, just off of Linvale Road). A tannery and a two or three other dwellings also existed there.
- Van Lieu's Corner was located on what is now Wertsville Road, just west of Rileyville Road. It was formerly called Quick's Corner and had a tavern, hotel, store and wheelwright shop. Richard Van Lieu, for whom the village was named, married Permelia Quick who was the maternal great-great-granddaughter of John Hart Permelia's maternal grandfather, Moses Stout, ran the tavern here. Her great-grandfather, Jacob Quick, was the namesake of Quick's Corner
- Woodsville, New Jersey was a village on the Brunswick Turnpike and Marshall's Corner Road. It was named after Joseph Wood, the store proprietor and postmaster of the village. The village had a store, a tavern, a post office, two blacksmith shops, a wheelwright, a school and a doctor. The village shrank over time as the railroads and Rt. 31 were both built away from it.
- Zion, New Jersey was a village located at Long Hill Road and Rock Brook. A mill was built along Rock Brook, giving the village the name of Rock Mill and later Rock Mills. The village had numerous houses, a saw-mill, a store, a blacksmith, wheelwright shops and the Boozer School. In 1897, when Rock Mill was to receive a post office, they changed their name to avoid confusion with the nearby Rocky Hill. They named it Zion after the Mount Zion African Methodist Episcopal Church.

== Natural features ==
- Baldpate Mountain offers vistas of the Delaware River and Pennsylvania
- Devil's Half Acre, a large boulder field with talus caves. It can be reached through the Sourland Mountain Preserve by taking the northernmost trail 3/4 of the way up and then heading about 1/2 mile to the north/northwest
- Fort Hans, a rock shelter on 3M property, was named for Hans Van Pelt, a pacifist who refused to fight in the Revolutionary War. It was later written on maps as Fort Haunts and Fort House. The shelter was also used by John Sullivan when camped at Clover Hill in Amwell Valley
- Hart's Cave, a pile of boulders that John Hart supposedly fled to from the British. The site is just west of Buttonwood Corner, just north of Highfields (on private property)
- Knitting Betty Rock, Zion Road, East Amwell—two slabs of rock on which a woman named Betty waited for her husband, a Revolutionary War Soldier, while knitting
- Roaring Rock, Hillsborough, an area full of boulders where Roaring Brook passes underneath
- Three Brothers (Pero's Hill - Pero the Hermit), Rileyville and Mountain Church Roads, East Amwell—three boulders sitting side by side atop a rock. The legend is that three men wishing to overcome the devil were turned into stone

== Historic sites ==
- Cat Tail Brook Bridge - Stone bridge built in 1825 on Montgomery Road
- Highfields (Charles Lindbergh Estate) - Lindbergh Road, East Amwell
- Howell Living History Farm - a Mercer County historical site in Pleasant Valley that also offers horse-drawn tours of the Pleasant Valley Rural Historic District.
- Joseph Stout House (Hunt House) - 595 Province Line Road, Built by Colonel Joseph Stout and later owned by John Price Hunt, the house was a meeting place for George Washington and his officers.
- Old Rocks Church - 260 Mount Airy-Habourton Road, church built in 1843

== Trails and recreation areas ==
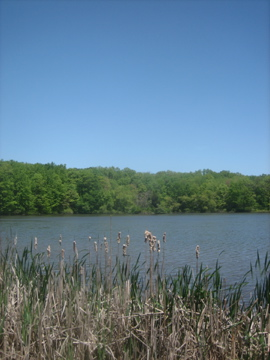
Amwell Lake

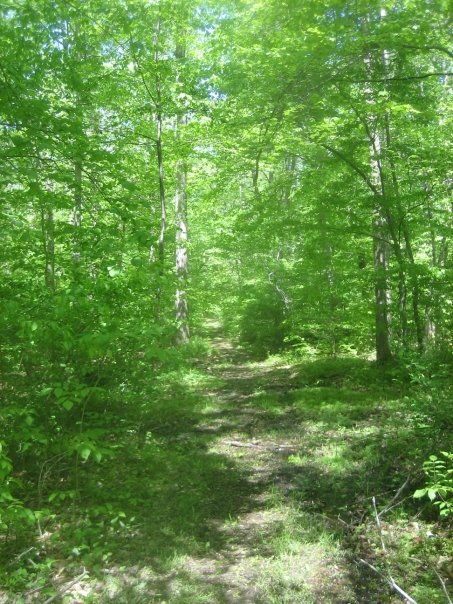
Northern Stony Brook Greenway

- Amwell Lake WMA – an WMA in Hopewell Township
- Belle Mountain – formerly a ski area, the area is still used by sledders in the winter
- Cedar Ridge Trail – 2-mile (3.2 km) trail in Hopewell Township
- Dry Run Creek – 1.2 mile there-and-back
- Eames Preserve – 1.6-mile (2.6 km) loop trail in Hopewell Township
- Elks Preserve – 1-mile loop
- Goat Hill – <1 mile
- Hopewell Borough Park – 3 miles of trails
- Hopewell Sourlands Trail – 1.7 mile one-way or 3.4 miles there-and-back
- Laport Reserve – an easy loop trail in East Amwell
- Nayfield Preserve – 1.5-mile (2.4 km) loop trail in Hopewell Township
- Omick Woods at Rocktown Preserve – 1.8 mile round trip
- Otto's Farm – 2 miles of trails
- Pryde's Point-Alexauken Creek – 3.4 miles of trails
- Rock Hopper Trail – 2.3 miles one-way – trailhead-to-trailhead
- Rock Mill Preserve – <1 mile loop
- Rocky Brook Trail – 2.8 miles round trip
- St. Michaels Farm Preserve – 7.3 miles of trail
- Skyview Preserve – 1 mile loop
- Sourlands Ecosystem Preserve – an area in East Amwell and Hopewell Township consisting of four trails: The Picnic Rock Trail (Green), Blue Trail, Yellow Trail and Orange Trail
- Sourlands Foothills Trail / Hopewell Sourlands Trail – 1-mile (1.6 km) trail in Hopewell Township.
- Sourland Mountain Preserve (Hunterdon Co.) – a small tract in East Amwell with four hiking trails
- Sourland Mountain Preserve (Somerset Co.) – a large tract of land on the Sourland Ridge with numerous hiking trails.
- Ted Stiles Preserve at Baldpate Mountain – 1,800-acre (7.3 km^{2}) preserve in Hopewell Township with numerous hiking trails
- Marshalls Corner / Thompson Preserve – 1.6 miles of trails
- Watershed Reserve – 10 miles of trails
- Woosamonsa Ridge Preserve – 3 miles of trails
