= Ninger =

Ninger may refer to:

- Emanuel Ninger, counterfeiter in the late 1880s.
- Ning'er Hani and Yi Autonomous County, in Yunnan, China
