= Snydertown =

Snydertown may refer to:

- Snydertown, New Jersey
- Snydertown, Centre County, Pennsylvania
- Snydertown, Fayette County, Pennsylvania
- Snydertown, Huntingdon County, Pennsylvania
- Snydertown, Northumberland County, Pennsylvania, a borough
- Snydertown, Westmoreland County, Pennsylvania
