= Sylvia Dubois =

African-American entrepreneur, formerly enslaved

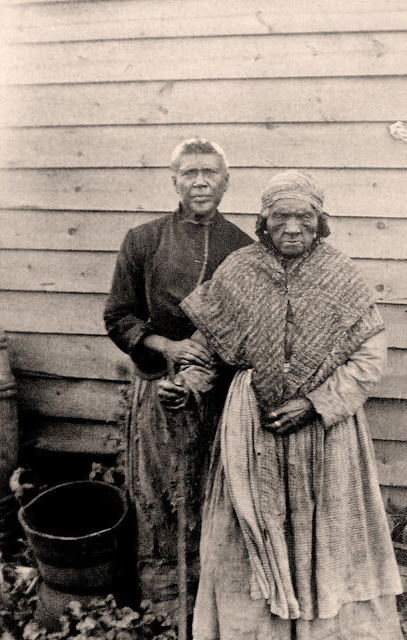
- Sylvia Dubois poses with her daughter Elizabeth Alexander, circa 1883
- Born: 1788-1789; Sourland Mountain, New Jersey
- Died: May 27, 1888 (aged 100 or 101); Sourland Mountain, New Jersey
- Occupations: Tavern owner, ferrywoman, field worker, domestic
- Known for: Gaining freedom by beating up slave mistress
- Notable work: Silvia Dubois: A Biografy of the Slav who Whipt Her Mistres and Gand Her Fredom by Dr. C.W. Larison
- Children: Moses, Judith, Charlotte, Dorcas, Elizabeth, Rachel

Sylvia Dubois (c. 1788/89 – May 27, 1888), also spelled as Silvia Dubois or Sylvie Dubois, was an African-American woman born into slavery who became free after striking her slave mistress. After gaining her freedom, Dubois moved to New Jersey, where she lived with her children until her death. A medical doctor by the name of C.W. Larison decided to document the life of Dubois and her journey to freedom in the book Silvia Dubois (Now 116 Yers Old) A Biografy of the Slav who Whipt Her Mistres and Gand Her Fredom.

== Early life as an enslaved woman ==
Dubois was born in Sourland Mountain, New Jersey, although the exact year is contested. Dubois herself said she was born March 5, 1768. However, historian Jared C Lobdell dates her birth to 1788 or 1789. Her parents were Cuffy Baird, a veteran of the Revolutionary War, and Dorcas Compton. Her father, Baird, had a different owner than Dubois and her mother.

Dorcas Compton was severely abused at the hands of her owner. Three days after giving birth, she was forced to go back to work, and was whipped with an ox-goad (also called a cattle prod) after she failed to do her job correctly. Compton fell ill with puerperal fever because of this incident but eventually recovered. Compton mortgaged herself against a loan several times in various attempts to buy her freedom but could not make her payments and consequently became enslaved again. In one such effort, Compton became enslaved to her creditor and was separated from Dubois.

As a child, Dubois lived in Flagtown, and at 14 years old, she moved to a town called Great Bend on the Susquehanna River in Pennsylvania to work on the tavern of her owner, Dominicus "Minna" Dubois. While in bondage, Dubois often did tasks that were considered "men's work" such as working the field and ferrying boats at a tavern on the Susquehanna. In her biography, Dubois recounts how she frequently cheated the other ferrymen out of customers and money.

Larison portrays Dubois as 5 feet 10 inches, 200 pounds, and "well-proportioned." Moreover, he describes Dubois as industrious, "capable of great endurance," and strong. According to Larison, Dubois enjoyed making children afraid of her by telling them that she would kidnap children and swallow them alive. Dubois also drank heavily, danced, and fought with both men and women.

While Dubois described her owner Minna as agreeable toward her, her mistress was abusive and domineering. Dubois described her as "the very devil himself." In one instance, her mistress whipped her so severely that she gave Dubois scars that she would have for the rest of her life. In another, Dubois claims that the mistress cracked her skull with a shovel.

== Freedom ==
In 1808, when Minna was out on grand-jury duty in Wilkes-Barre, the mistress had Dubois scrub the bar-room because guests were over. Dubois did not do the scrubbing to her liking, and the mistress hit her. In retaliation, Dubois struck the mistress, and she fell and landed against the door. Dubois thought that she had killed her at first. The other people in the bar-room attempted to intervene, but Dubois threatened them with physical violence, and no one approached her.

Dubois fled to Chenango Point in New York, but Minna sent for her. She went back to Great Bend, and Minna told her that if she took her child to New Jersey, he would write her a pass and officially give Dubois her freedom. Consequently, Dubois took her baby and went to Flagtown, New Jersey, to find her mother. There, she discovered that her mother had moved to New Brunswick, so she tracked her down and remained there for years.

In 1812, Dubois' grandfather bought Cedar Summit on Sourland Mountain, where he opened Put's Tavern, an establishment known for being rowdy. Dubois set up her homestead near the tavern and took care of her grandfather, inheriting the tavern after he died.

In the 1830s, Dubois and her two youngest daughters, Elizabeth Alexander and Charlotte Moore, went to court multiple times for disturbance of the peace, assault, and operation of an unlicensed house. Around 1840, Dubois' tavern and home burned down, and she lost her property for failing to pay taxes.

=== Later years and death ===
Dubois' second home burned down between this time and 1883, and she spent the rest of her life living in relative poverty at Sourland Mountain. Dubois died six years after Larison interviewed her at the age of either 100 or 101. She died during the blizzard of 1888. Her body is believed to rest in Stoutsburg Cemetery in Sourland Mountain, New Jersey.

== Silvia Dubois: A Biografy of the Slav who Whipt Her Mistres and Gand Her Fredom ==
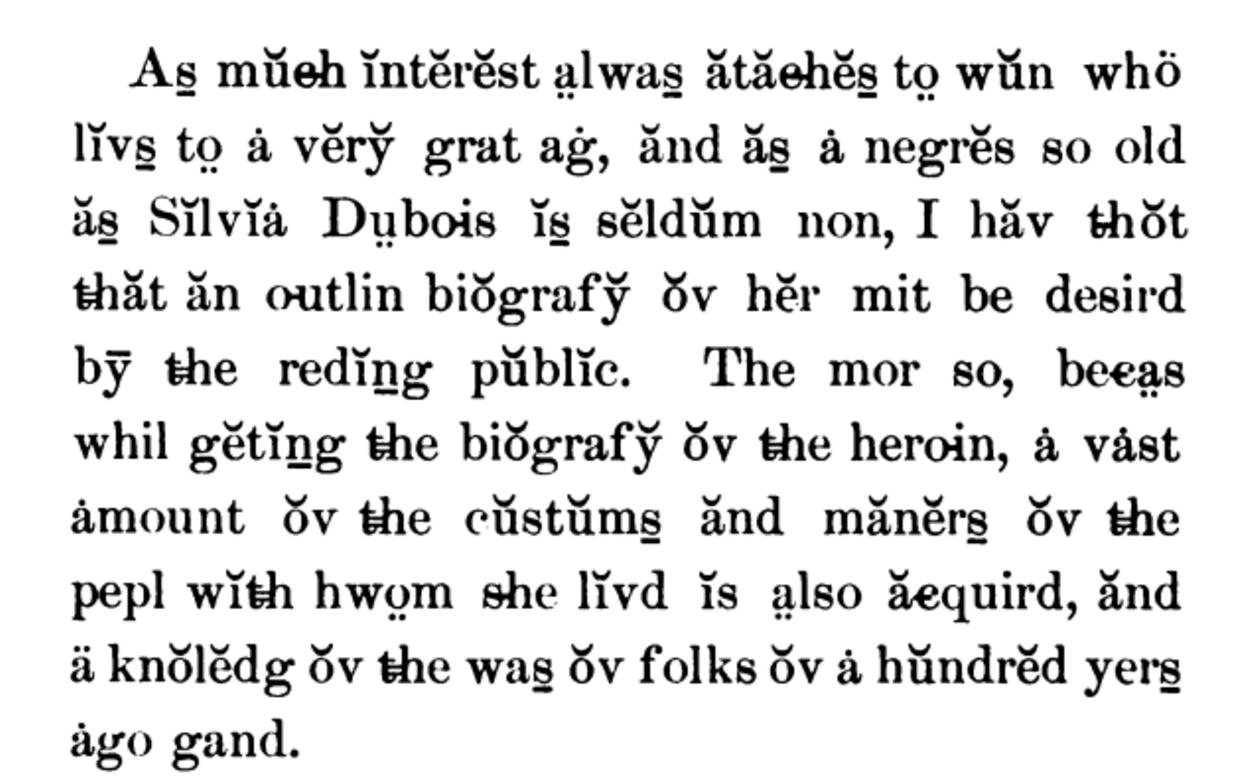
Sample text of C.W. Larison's orthography in Silvia Dubois : a biografy of the slav who whipt her mistres and gand her fredom

C.W. Larison, the writer of Sylvia Dubois' biography Silvia Dubois (Now 116 Yers Old) A Biografy of the Slav who Whipt Her Mistres and Gand Her Fredom, was a physician and former educator interested in documenting local history. He first met with Dubois at Cedar Summit in January 1883 to interview her. He met her a total of three times before releasing her biography.

Larison wrote the book in a phonetic orthography of his creation. Historian Jared C. Lobdell edited, translated the phonetic spelling, and wrote an introduction for a new publication of Dubois' biography by Larison.

The authenticity of Dubois' stories, as told to Larison, is debated. Lobdell cautions that Dubois' story bridges the line between history and folklore but that it has value as an account of "social history." He directly challenges Dubois' assertion that she was 116 during her interviews by finding historical evidence to the contrary. English professor DoVeanna S. Fulton criticizes Lobdell's labeling of the story as folklore because it privileges history with documentation over oral history.

== Cited works ==
- Berthold, Michael C. "Dubois, Silvia." Oxford African American Studies Center. Accessed April 11, 2016. http://www.oxfordaasc.com/article/opr/t0001/e2557?hi=0.
- Berthold, Michael C. "'The Peals of Her Terrific Language': The Control of Representation in Silvia Dubois, a Biografy of the Slav Who Whipt Her Mistres and Gand Her Fredom." MELUS 20, no. 2 (1995): 3–14. Accessed April 11, 2016. doi:10.2307/467619.
- "Dubois, Silvia." Oxford African American Studies Center. Accessed April 11, 2016.
- Fulton, DoVeanna S. "Tale-Bearing and Dressing Out: Black Women's Speech Acts That Expose Torture and Abuse by Slave Mistresses in Our Nig, Sylvia Dubois, and The Story of Mattie J. Jackson." In Speaking Power: Black Feminist Orality in Women's Narratives of Slavery, 41–59. Albany: State University of New York Press, 2006. ISBN 978-0791466384.
- Fulton Minor, DoVeanna S., Reginald H. Pitts, Louisa Picquet, Mattie J. Jackson, and Cornelius Wilson Larison. "Sylvia Dubois: A Biography." In Speaking Lives, Authoring Texts: Three African American Women's Oral Slave Narratives, 131–93. Albany: State University of New York Press, 2010. ISBN 978-1438429649
- Larison, Cornelius Wilson, and Jared Lobdell. Silvia Dubois: A Biografy of the Slav Who Whipt Her Mistres and Gand Her Fredom. New York: Oxford University Press, 1988. ISBN 0195052390
- Loewenberg, Bert James, and Ruth Bogin. "To Knit Together the Broken Ties of Kinship: Silvia Dubois." In Black Women in Nineteenth-century American Life: Their Words, Their Thoughts, Their Feelings, 37–47. University Park: Pennsylvania State University Press, 1976. ISBN 978-0271012070
