= Baldpate Mountain (Mercer County, New Jersey) =

Mountain in Mercer County, New Jersey, United States of America

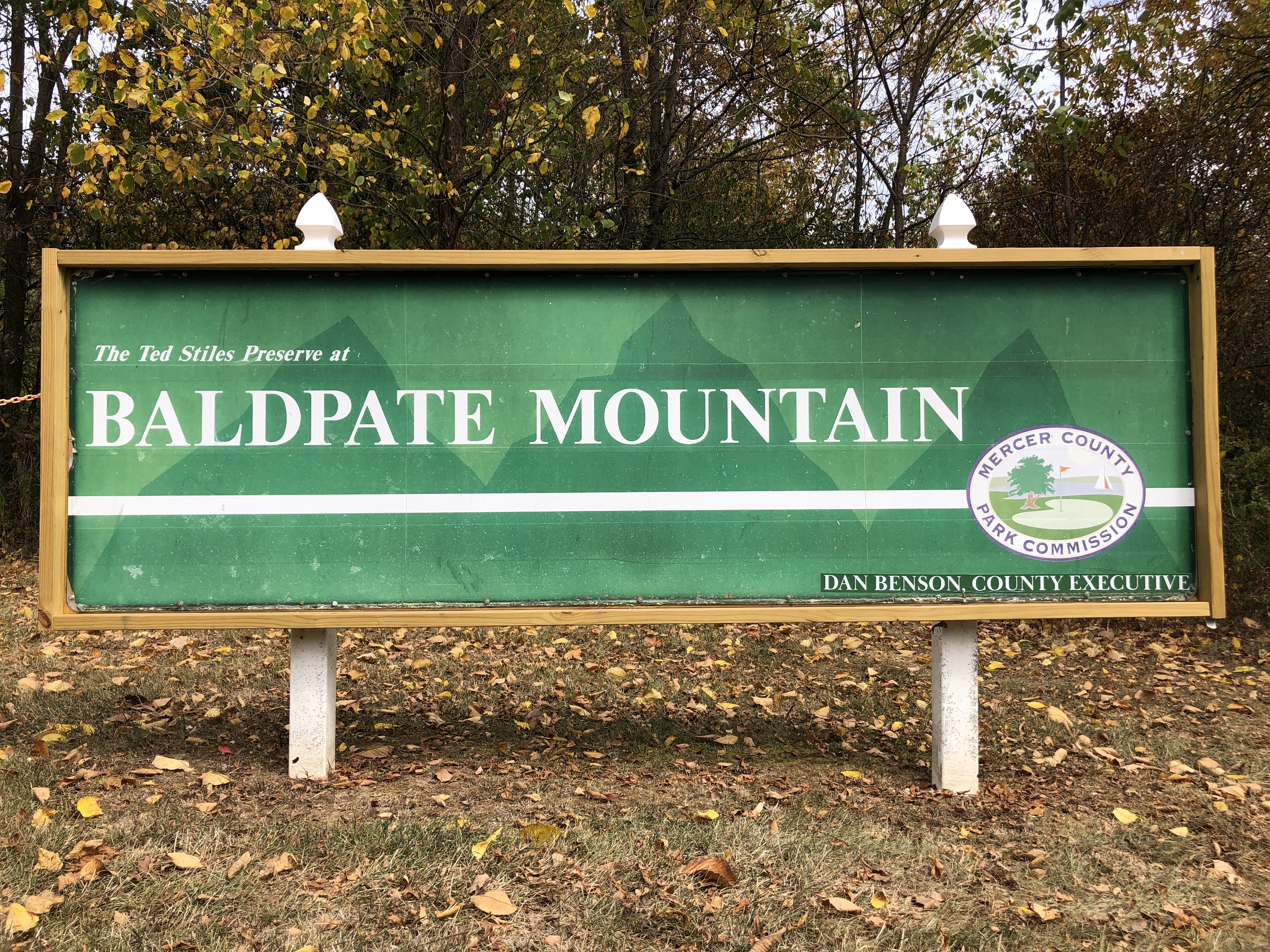
- Sign at the Fiddlers Creek Road entrance to the Ted Stiles Preserve on Baldpate Mountain

Highest point
- Elevation: 479 ft (146 m)
- Prominence: 89 ft (27 m)
- Coordinates: 40°19′48″N 74°52′22″W

Geography
- Location within Mercer County, New Jersey
- Location: Hopewell Township, Mercer County, New Jersey
- Parent range: The Sourlands
- Topo map: USGS Pennington

Climbing
- Easiest route: White-blazed Ridge Trail from Pleasant Valley Road trailhead

Baldpate Mountain is a mountain located in the western part of Hopewell Township, Mercer County, New Jersey, near the Delaware River. A part of The Sourlands, it is the highest peak in Mercer County, and most of the mountain is protected within the county-owned Ted Stiles Preserve.
