= Stoutsburg Sourland African American Museum =

- Mount Zion African Methodist Episcopal Church
- U.S. National Register of Historic Places
- New Jersey Register of Historic Places
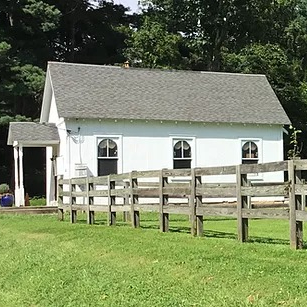
- Mt. Zion AME Church

- Location within Somerset County, New Jersey Location within New Jersey Location within the United States
- Location: 189 Hollow Road, Skillman, New Jersey
- Coordinates: 40°25′02″N 74°43′16″W
- Built: 1899
- Built by: Elmer Hight
- NRHP reference No.: 100006611
- NJRHP No.: 2556

Significant dates
- Added to NRHP: June 7, 2021
- Designated NJRHP: October 18, 2018

The Stoutsburg Sourland African American Museum (SSAAM) is a history museum located in the Skillman section of Montgomery Township, New Jersey, United States. The museum is located at the Mount Zion African Methodist Episcopal Church, an African Methodist Episcopal church constructed in 1899. The church was added to the National Register of Historic Places on June 7, 2021.

== History ==
=== Origins ===
SSAAM was founded by historians Elaine Buck and Beverly Mills, whose 2018 book If These Stones Could Talk chronicles the history of the African American presence in the Sourland Mountain region of central New Jersey. The museum emerged from a partnership between the Stoutsburg Cemetery Association and the Sourland Conservancy.

=== Development ===
As of December 2021, the museum is still under development as Mt. Zion AME Church undergoes historic restoration work. When open, SSAAM plans to present historical exhibits and other public programming to educate visitors about African American history in New Jersey. It was added to the New Jersey Black Heritage Trail in 2024.

== Mt. Zion AME Church ==
=== History ===
The Mt. Zion AME Church was originally established in 1866 by African American residents, the descendants of both free and enslaved people, of the Sourland Mountain area. The church was originally located in Zion, New Jersey, but was moved to its current location in Skillman in 1899. The church was home to an active congregation until 2005, when it stopped holding worship services.

From the 19th century until the 1930s, the Mt. Zion AME Church organized "camp meetings" each summer to benefit the local community. These events included sermons, singing, and food.

=== Archaeological investigation ===
In December 2020, SSAAM partnered with the Archaeological Society of New Jersey to conduct an archaeological dig at the site of the Mt. Zion AME Church. The investigation uncovered approximately 250 artifacts dating to the late-19th century and 20th century, including window glass, nails and bricks, and ceramics.

=== Restoration ===
SSAAM has been awarded multiple grants to conduct restoration and historic preservation work at the church, including Somerset County Historic Preservation Grants in 2016 and 2021; a 2018 grant from the New Jersey Historic Trust and 1772 Foundation; and a 2019 grant from the Somerset County Open Space, Recreation, Farmland and Historic Preservation Trust Fund.

== See also ==
- National Register of Historic Places listings in Somerset County, New Jersey
