= New Market–Linvale–Snydertown Historic District =

- U.S. National Register of Historic Places
- U.S. Historic district
- New Jersey Register of Historic Places
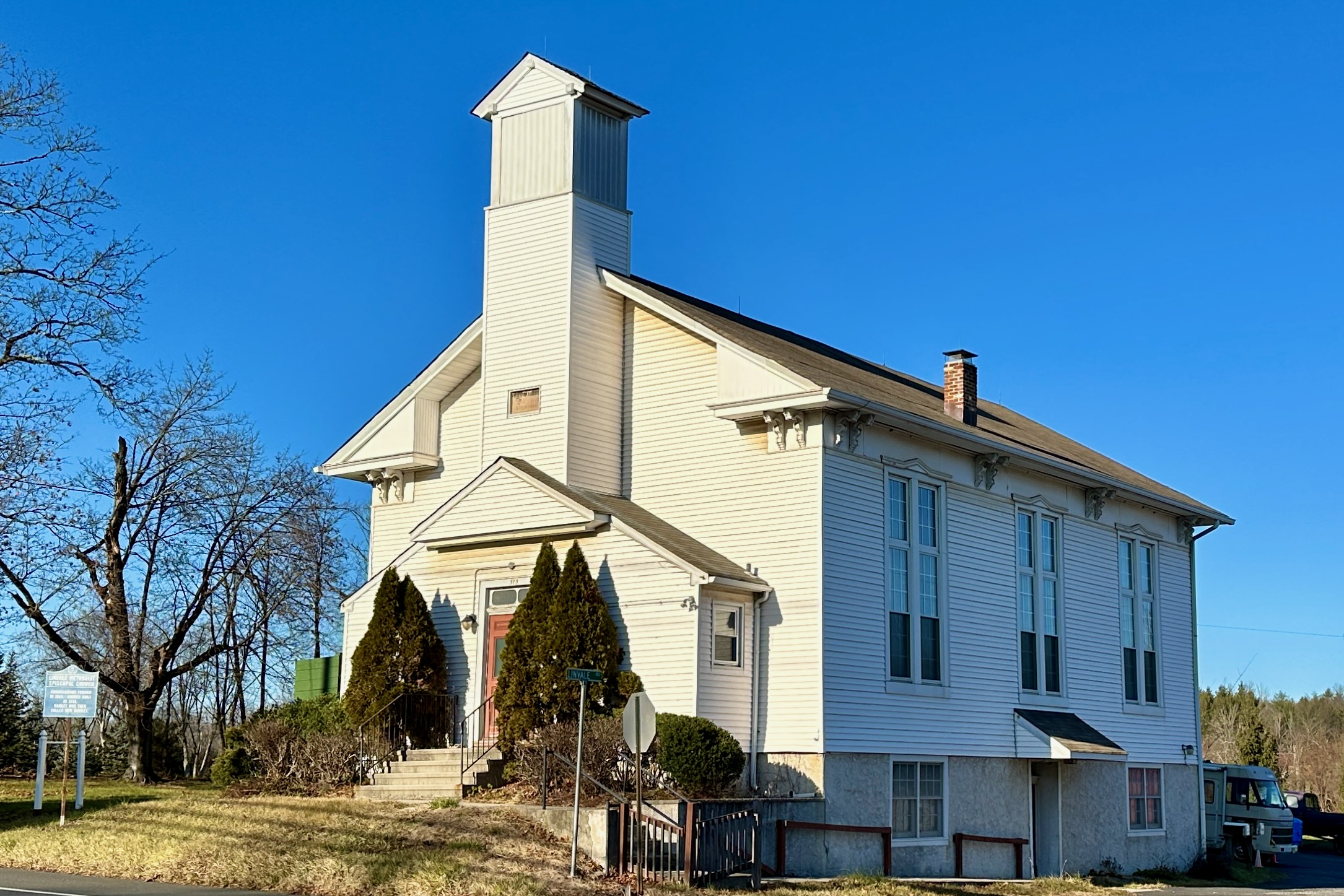
- Linvale United Methodist Church

- Location within Hunterdon County, New Jersey Location within New Jersey Location within the United States
- Location: Roughly along NJ 31, Linvale, Snydertown, and Woodsville Roads, Linvale, New Jersey and Snydertown, New Jersey
- Coordinates: 40°23′46″N 74°50′05″W
- Area: 160 acres (65 ha)
- Architectural style: Italianate, Gothic Revival
- NRHP reference No.: 98000097
- NJRHP No.: 3232

Significant dates
- Added to NRHP: February 12, 1998
- Designated NJRHP: December 29, 1997

The New Market–Linvale–Snydertown Historic District is a 160-acre (65 ha) historic district located along NJ 31, Linvale, Snydertown, and Woodsville Roads in the communities of Linvale, formerly known as New Market, and Snydertown in the townships of East Amwell and West Amwell in Hunterdon County, New Jersey, United States. It was added to the National Register of Historic Places on February 12, 1998, for its significance in architecture, commerce, settlement, and community development. The district includes 33 contributing buildings, four contributing structures, and one contributing object.

== History and description ==
The Linvale United Methodist Church, historically known as the New Market Methodist Episcopal Church, was built in 1858 following the Wren–Gibbs church building tradition. The one-story frame building features Italianate and Gothic Revival styles. There is a square bell tower with a gable roof in the front center. The congregation was formed in 1844. The former New Market Store in Linvale was first built around 1770 and rebuilt in 1866. The two-story brick building has a gable-fronted roof and shows Italianate and Gothic Revival styles. A late 18th-century or early 19th-century grist mill in Snydertown has been converted into a residence.

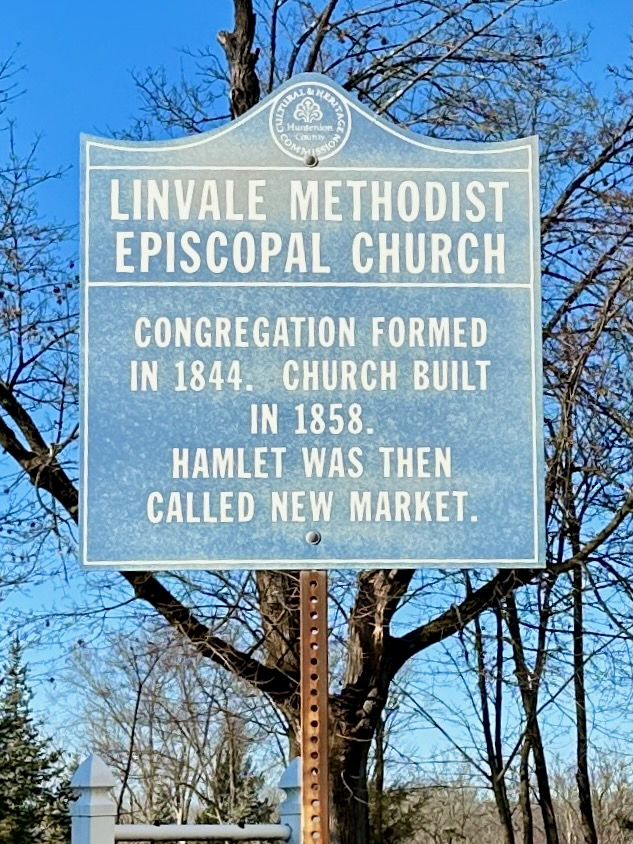
Church information sign

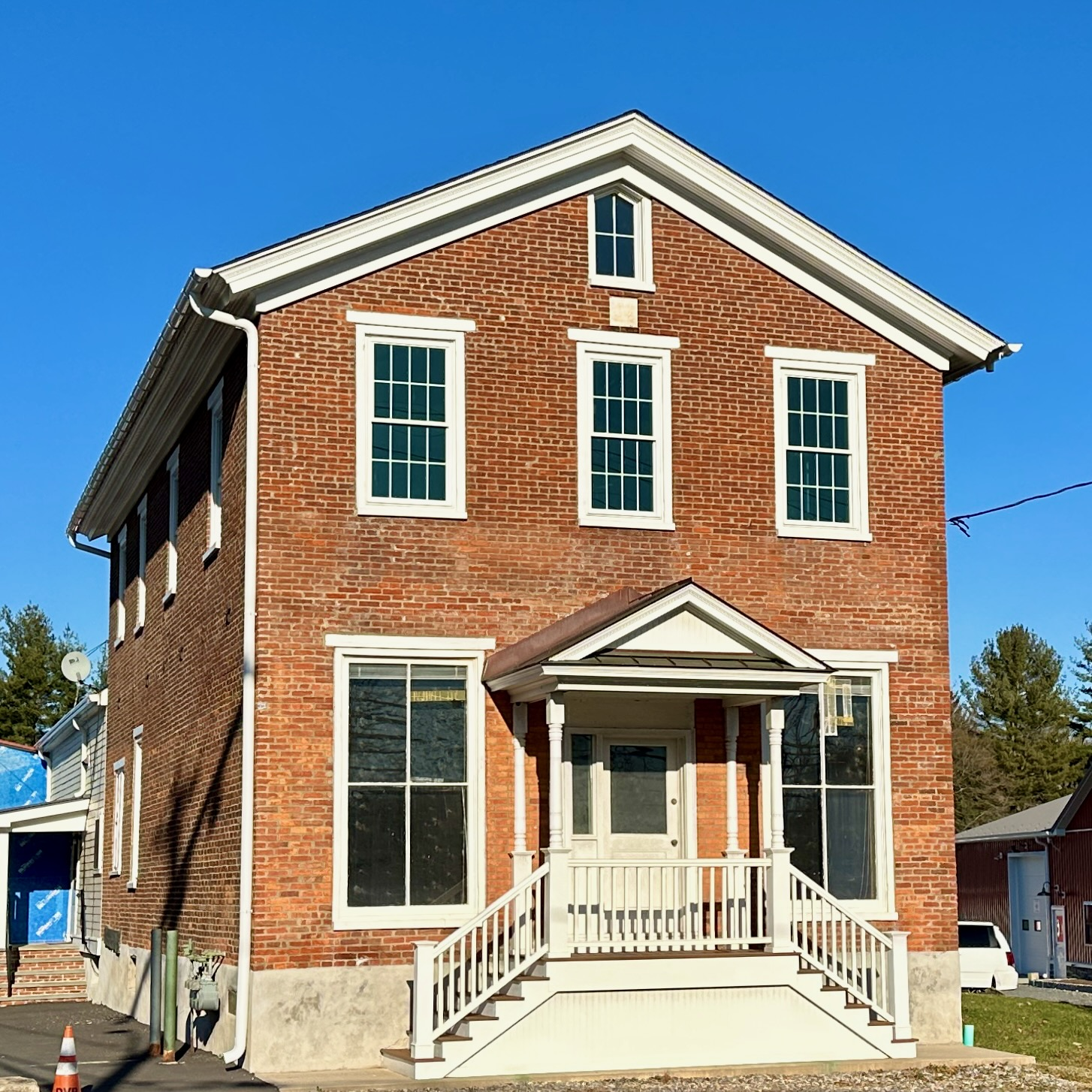
Former New Market Store in Linvale

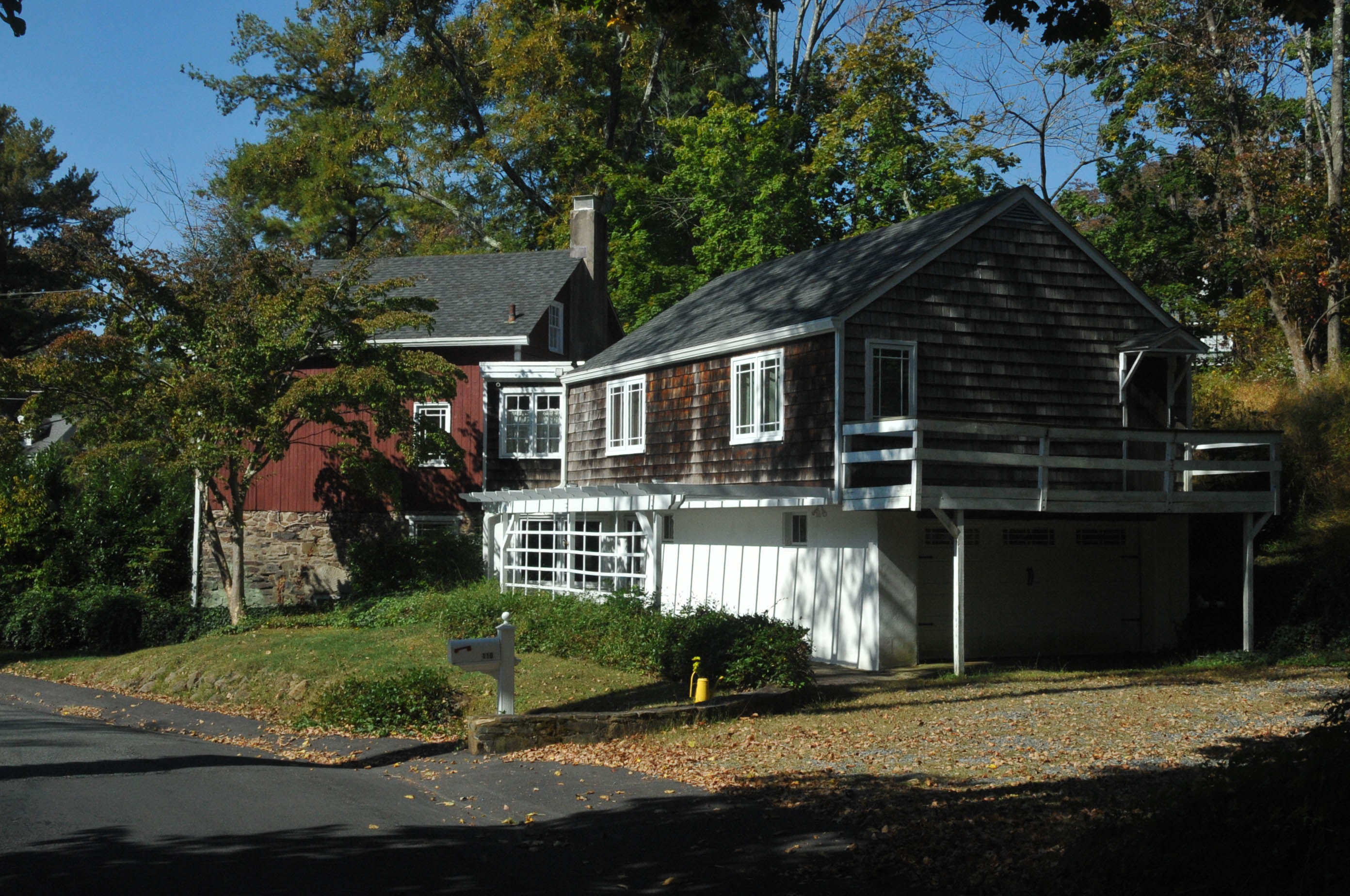
Former grist mill in Snydertown

== See also ==
- National Register of Historic Places listings in Hunterdon County, New Jersey
