= Snydertown, New Jersey =

Populated place in Hunterdon County, New Jersey, US

- Unincorporated community
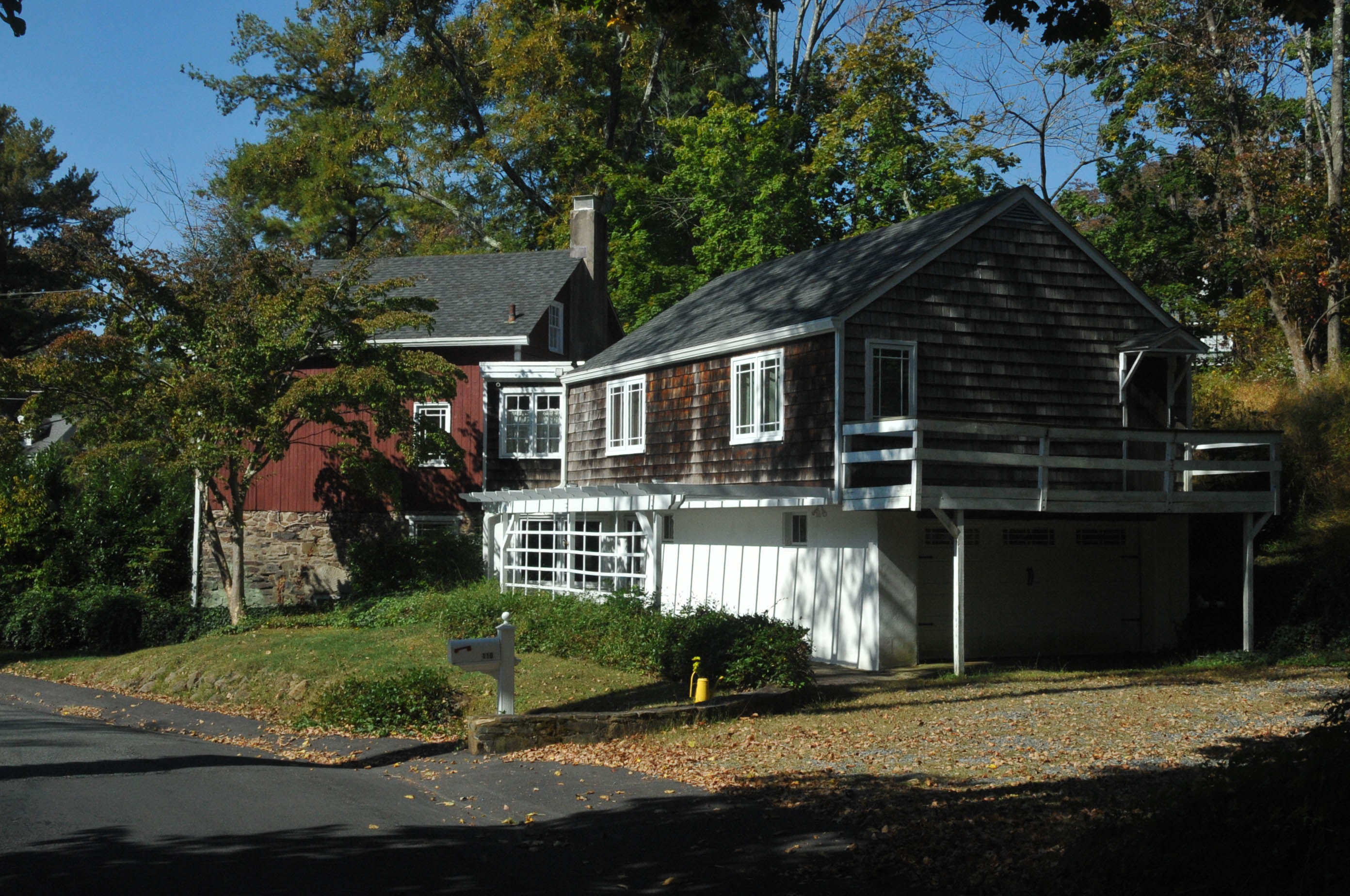
- Former grist mill on Snydertown Road

- Location of Snydertown in Hunterdon County Inset: Location of county within the state of New Jersey Snydertown (New Jersey) Snydertown (the United States)
- Coordinates: 40°23′55″N 74°50′02″W
- Country: United States
- State: New Jersey
- County: Hunterdon
- Township: East Amwell
- Elevation: 318 ft (97 m)
- GNIS feature ID: 880676

Snydertown is an unincorporated community located within East Amwell Township in Hunterdon County, in the U.S. state of New Jersey. The settlement is located on the southern face of Sourland Mountain at the intersection of Linvale Road and Snydertown Road. In the past, a mill operated in Snydertown.

== Historic district ==
The New Market–Linvale–Snydertown Historic District encompassing the community was added to the National Register of Historic Places in 1998 for its significance in architecture, commerce, settlement, and community development.

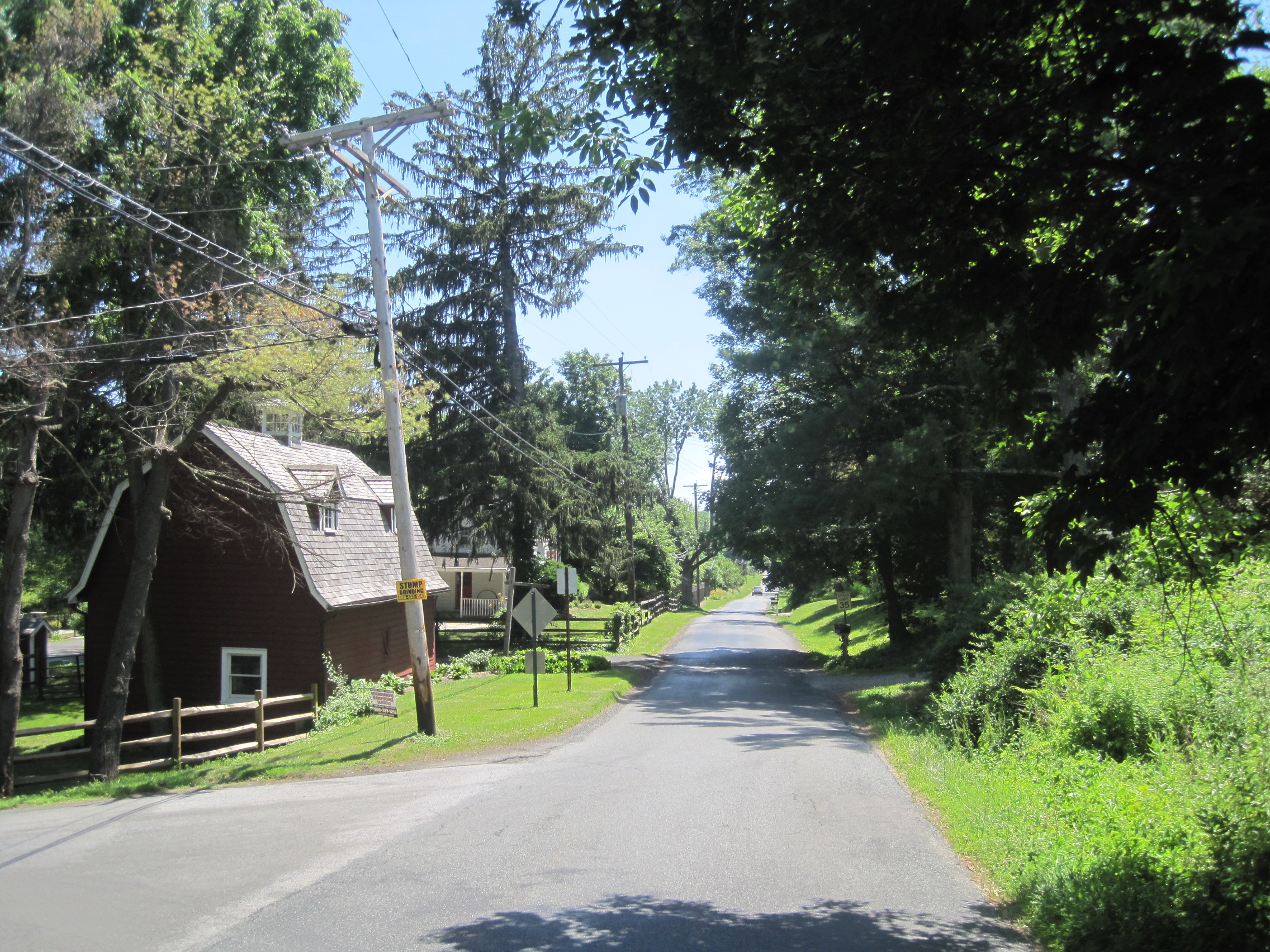
At the intersection of Linvale Road and Snydertown Road
