= Sourland Mountain Preserve =

Protected area of New Jersey, US

Coordinates: 40.471°N 74.703°W

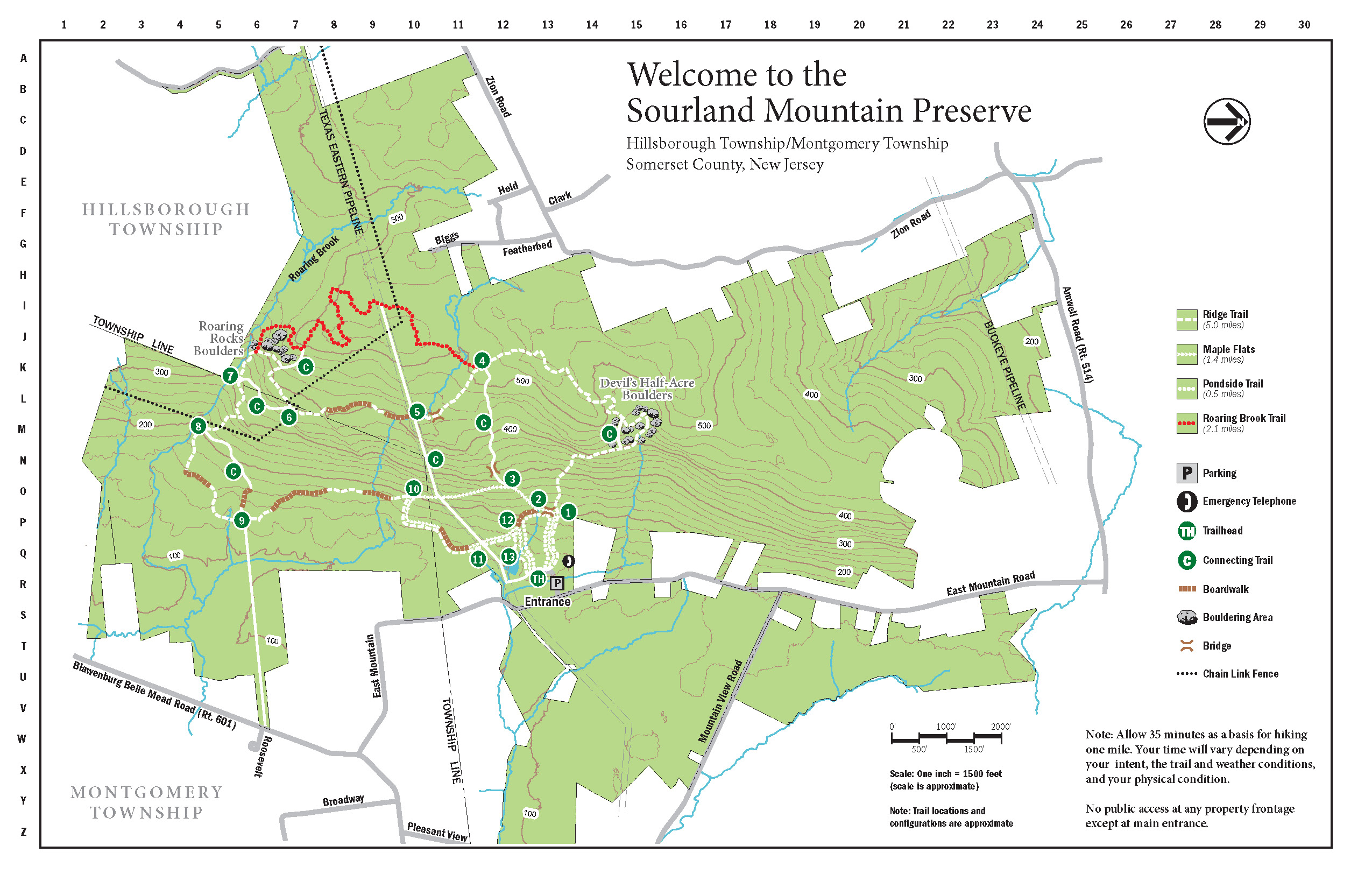
2014 map of the Sourland Mountain Preserve. Trail names have been updated since.

The Sourland Mountain Preserve is located on Sourland Mountain, in the Sourlands region of New Jersey. It is within Hillsborough Township and Montgomery Township of Somerset County. The largest donation of land was made by Norma Gilbert Farr, trustee of the Linus R. Gilbert Foundation. The Farr family has donated over 3,000 acres to the Sourland Mountain Preserve and the Somerset County Parks Commission.

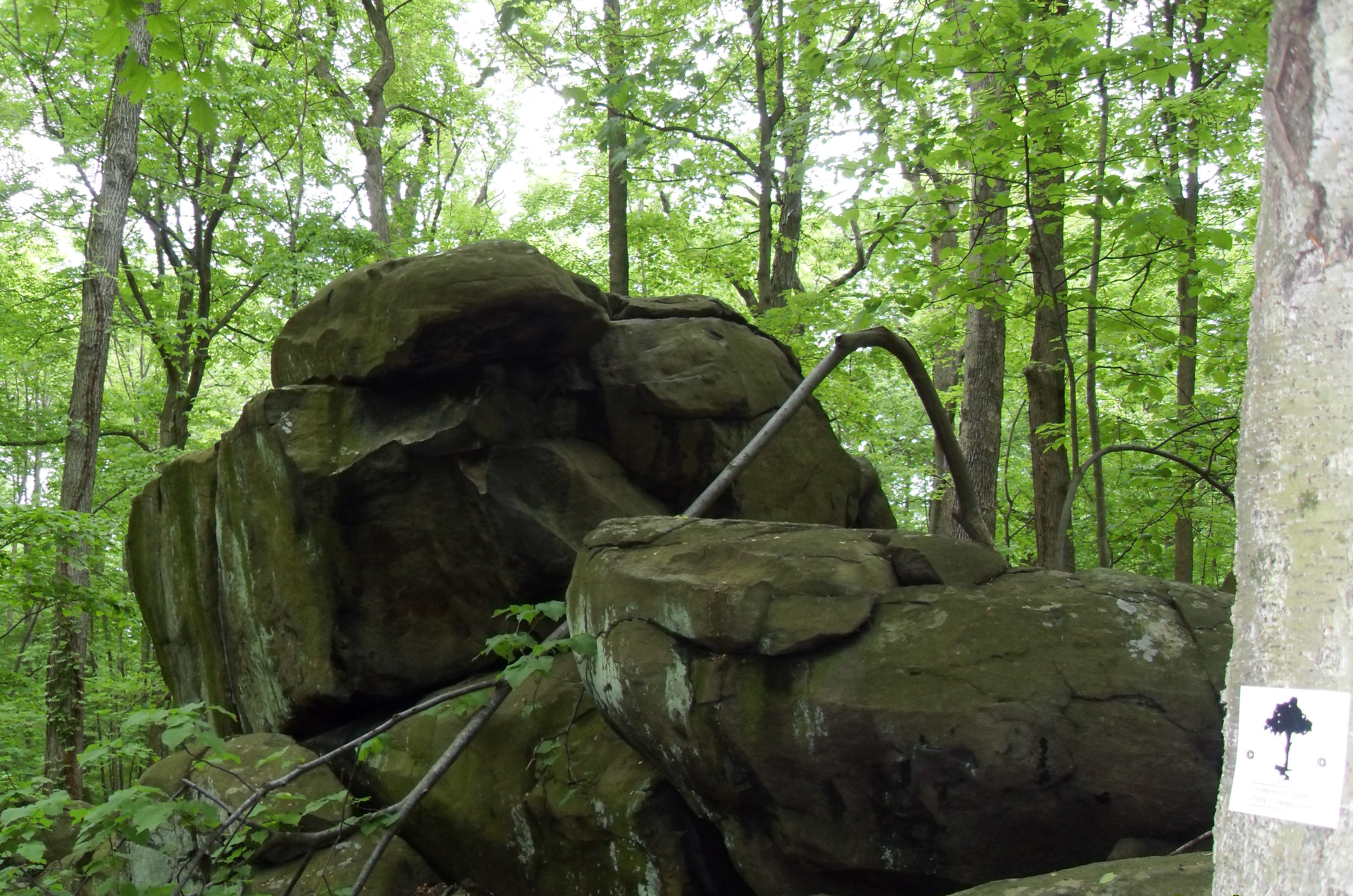
Volcanic boulders, with trail blaze, in the Sourland Mountain Preserve

== Features ==
The park covers 3,025 acres (12.24 km^{2}). The name "Sourland" may derive from the soil, described as "sorrel-land" or reddish brown land. Seen in the park are red fox, gray fox, deer, even coyote. Birds include tanagers, wrens, and chickadees.

For anyone who hikes and lives in central Jersey, Sourland provides quick access to a hiking experience that can rival some of the trails in the Ridge and Valley section and the Highlands section of northern New Jersey. Several biology courses at Hillsborough High School take field trips to the preserve to encourage students to visit and appreciate it.

The Texas Eastern Transmission Pipeline goes through the middle of the park and is a fully usable trail. On clear days, Manhattan (approximately 40 miles away) is visible from the top of the pipeline.

=== Trails ===
Ridge Trail

The main feature of the preserve is the 5-mile (8.0 km) Ridge Trail [white squares], suitable for hiking and off-road biking. There are two shorter routes [white circular and white triangle blazes] and "connector" trails [white "C" blaze]. The trails have been well blazed by the Somerset County Park Commission. The Park Commission supplies with trail maps, in the map box just off the parking lot. A complete circuit of the Ridge Trail for an experienced hiker can take about two and one-half hours.

While located in a suburban section of central New Jersey, Sourland Mountain is a heavily wooded and rocky place. The Ridge Trail can be quite difficult and technical in spots. At the top of the ridge, there are some very large and beautiful exposed boulders. Roaring Brook passes through the southern edge of the preserve. While not officially a part of the preserve, hikers often visit the brook to see one of the finest boulder fields in New Jersey.

New trails

Opened in 2007, a new extension to the Ridge Trail takes hikers to Roaring Brook and one of the finer boulder fields of the Northeast. The trail's extension is the result of work by the Somerset County Park Commission, with support from the 3M Company.

In 2009, a newly blazed trail system runs north from Roaring Brook before turning east and back into the preserve. The blazes for this trail system are red squares. The trail connects back to the Ridge Trail [white square]. Another trail, with red circular blazes, goes north and ends at the natural gas line route. These trails are excellent for hiking, and are laid out for off-road biking, with many twists and turns taking advantage of the topography. It is a short hike or ride down the gas line to get back to the original Ridge Trail.

=== Trail Updates ===
As of October 2022, The Sourland mountain preserve has five major trails: Maple Flats trail (1.4 miles), Devils half-Acre trail (1.75 miles), Roaring Rocks Trail (1 mile), Ridge Trail (1.4 miles), Tributary trail (2.5 miles). Maple flats and Tributary are relatively flat trails with rocky and uneven terrain. The Devils Half acre, Roaring Rocks, and Ridge trail are harder trails with high elevation changes and large, rocky surfaces. The perimeter of all trails at the preserve total 5.4 miles.

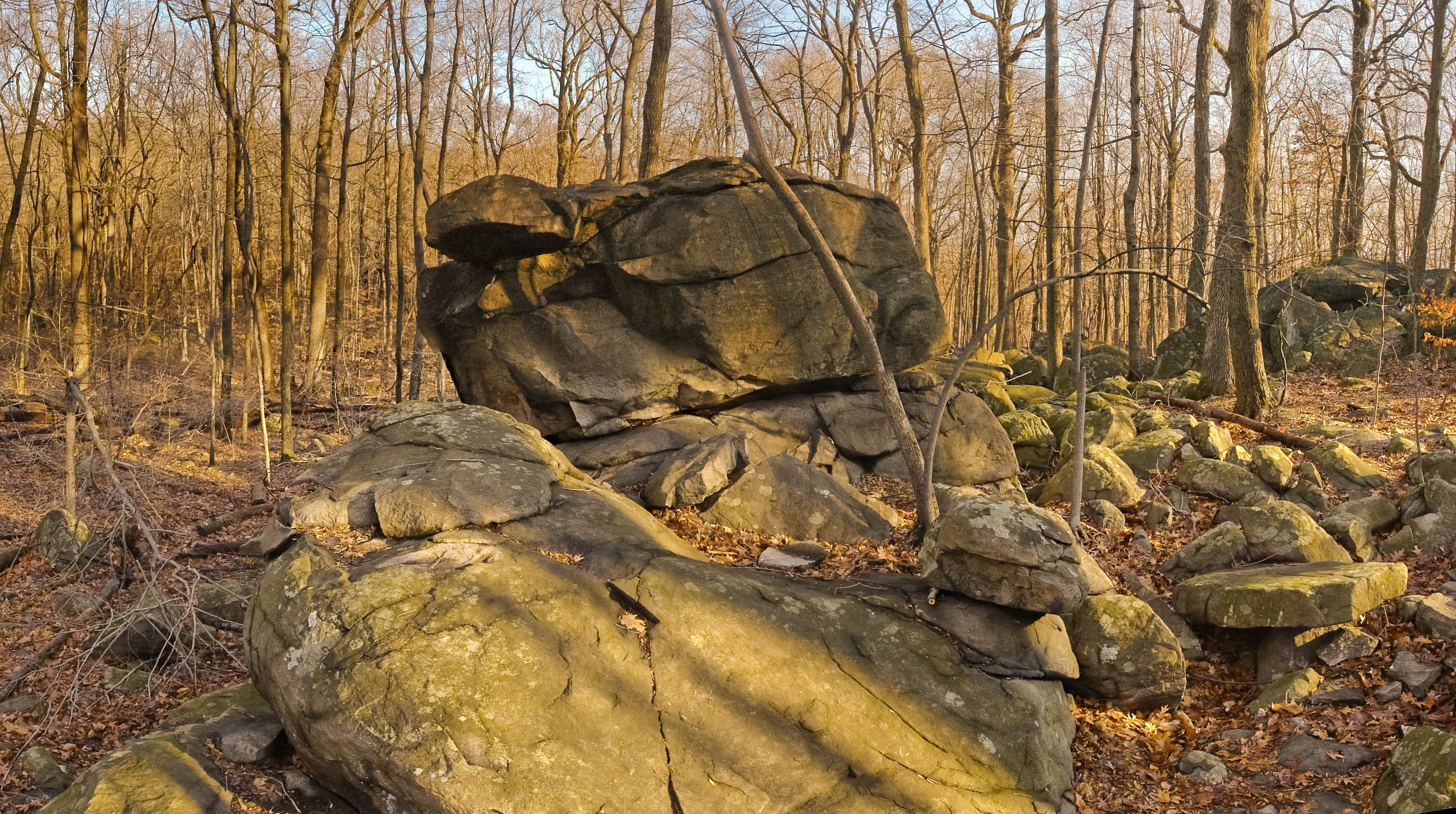
Big diabase boulders and woodlands on Sourland Mountain

== Geology ==
Geologically, Sourland Mountain is composed of sedimentary and igneous rocks of Late Triassic and Early Jurassic age, and are part of the Newark basin rift lake system. The main ridge in Sourland Mountain is intrusive diabase (a type of igneous rock) associated with the same igneous event that produced the Palisades Sill (the cliffs along the west side of the Hudson River across from New York City), and The Watchung Mountains in Northern New Jersey. The sedimentary rocks are Late Triassic in age and are part of the lower Passaic Formation of the Newark Basin sedimentary sequence.
