= Emanuel Ninger =

German counterfeiter

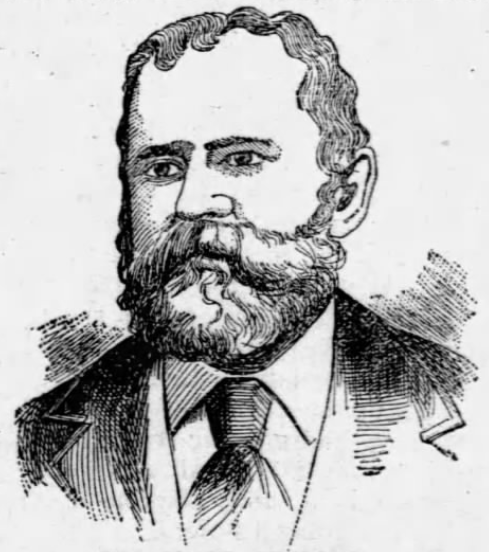
- Born: 1846 or 1847; Germany
- Died: July 25, 1924 (aged 77); Reading, Pennsylvania
- Other name: Jim the Penman
- Occupation: Counterfeiter
- Spouse: Adelaide Ninger

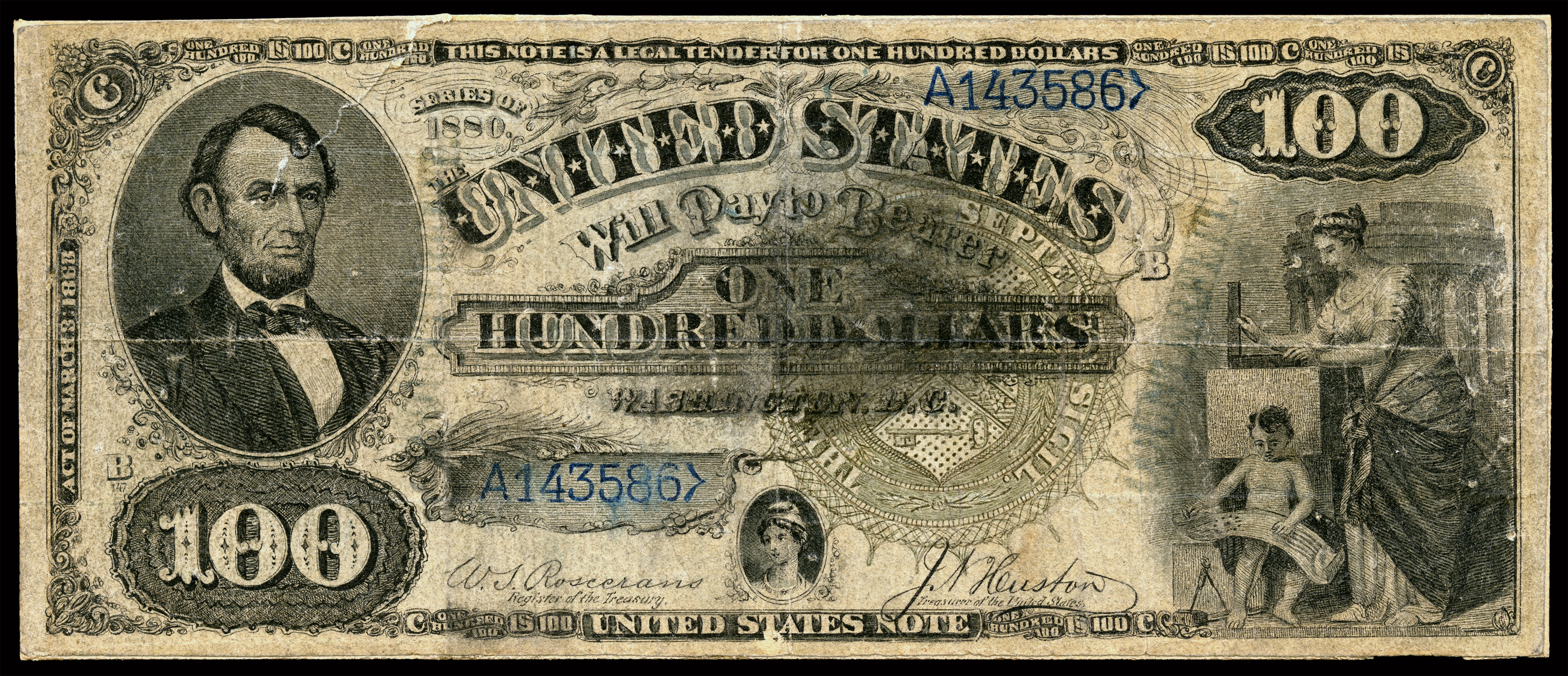
Series 1880 Ninger drawn $100 Legal Tender Note, attributed to Emanuel Ninger (National Museum of American History)

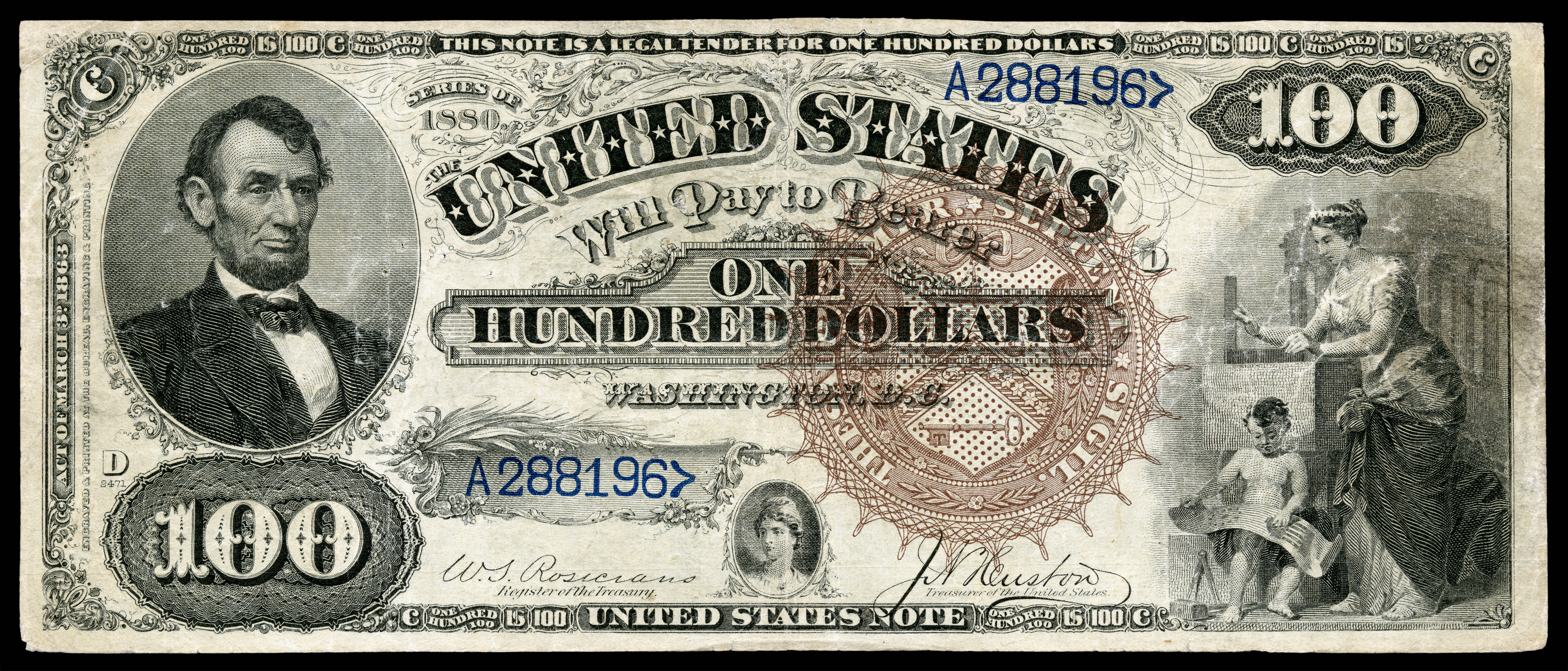
Series 1880 genuine $100 Legal Tender Note.

Emanuel Ninger (1846/1847 – July 25, 1924), known as "Jim the Penman", was a counterfeiter in the late 1880s.

== Biography ==
Ninger and his wife, Adelaide, arrived c. 1876 from Germany to live in Hoboken, New Jersey. He worked as a sign painter and then bought a farm in Westfield, New Jersey. He told his neighbors that he was receiving a pension from the Prussian army. On October 12, 1892 he moved to Flagtown, New Jersey.

== Forgery ==
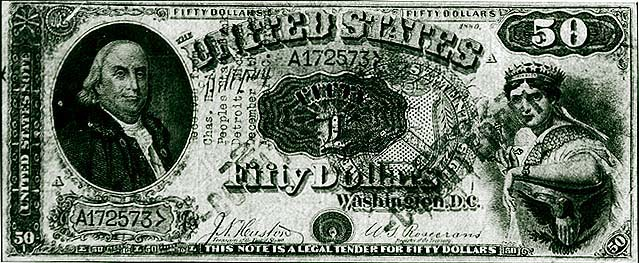
A Ninger bill, seized in 1896.

Ninger began counterfeiting in 1878, and by 1879 the Treasury redemption bureau was aware of his work. Not having any clues as to Ninger's identity, he was named "Jim the Penman" by the Secret Service. Beginning with a $10 bill, he moved on to $20s and $50s, and later $100s. His first $100 was spotted by the Treasury in November 1893. Ninger would buy bond paper from Crane & Company, in Dalton, Massachusetts, cut it to the same size as the $50 and $100 United States Notes he was copying, then soak the paper in a dilute coffee solution. He would align the paper over a genuine banknote, place the two on a piece of glass, and trace the resulting image. He used a camel’s hair brush to put colors on the note, imitated the silk threads with red and blue inks, and suggested rather than duplicated the intricate geometric lathework. Notably, he omitted the line crediting the Bureau of Engraving and Printing from all of his bills, and some of them were also missing the counterfeiting warning. When asked why he omitted the Bureau of Engraving and Printing credit on his bills, Ninger responded, "Because dey [sic] didn't make dem [sic]."

He worked for weeks at a time on each note, and this was profitable because at the time one of those notes was extremely valuable (about $2,000 or $4,000 in today's dollars).

He was apprehended by the United States Secret Service in March 1896 when he paid a bartender with a $50 banknote, the note got wet, and the ink began to smudge. Although first pleading not guilty, Ninger changed his plea to guilty, and was sentenced on May 29, 1896 to six years in the Erie County Penitentiary. At some point after his release he forged a few British pound notes. He died on July 25, 1924, at 77 years old.

Ninger was somewhat romanticized during his time, as almost a "Robin Hood"-like character, whose crimes were deemed "victimless", both because only the extremely wealthy could afford the bills that he was forging, and also because with the proper art connections, one could stand to profit by receiving a Ninger work. Ninger notes are illegal to possess; it is estimated that there are 20-30 notes in the hands of collectors, out of an estimated 700 made by Ninger. One week before being sentenced, Ninger only admitted to making 390 notes over his 18-year career.

== See also ==
- JSG Boggs
- Han van Meegeren
- Trompe-l'œil
