= Linvale, New Jersey =

- Unincorporated community
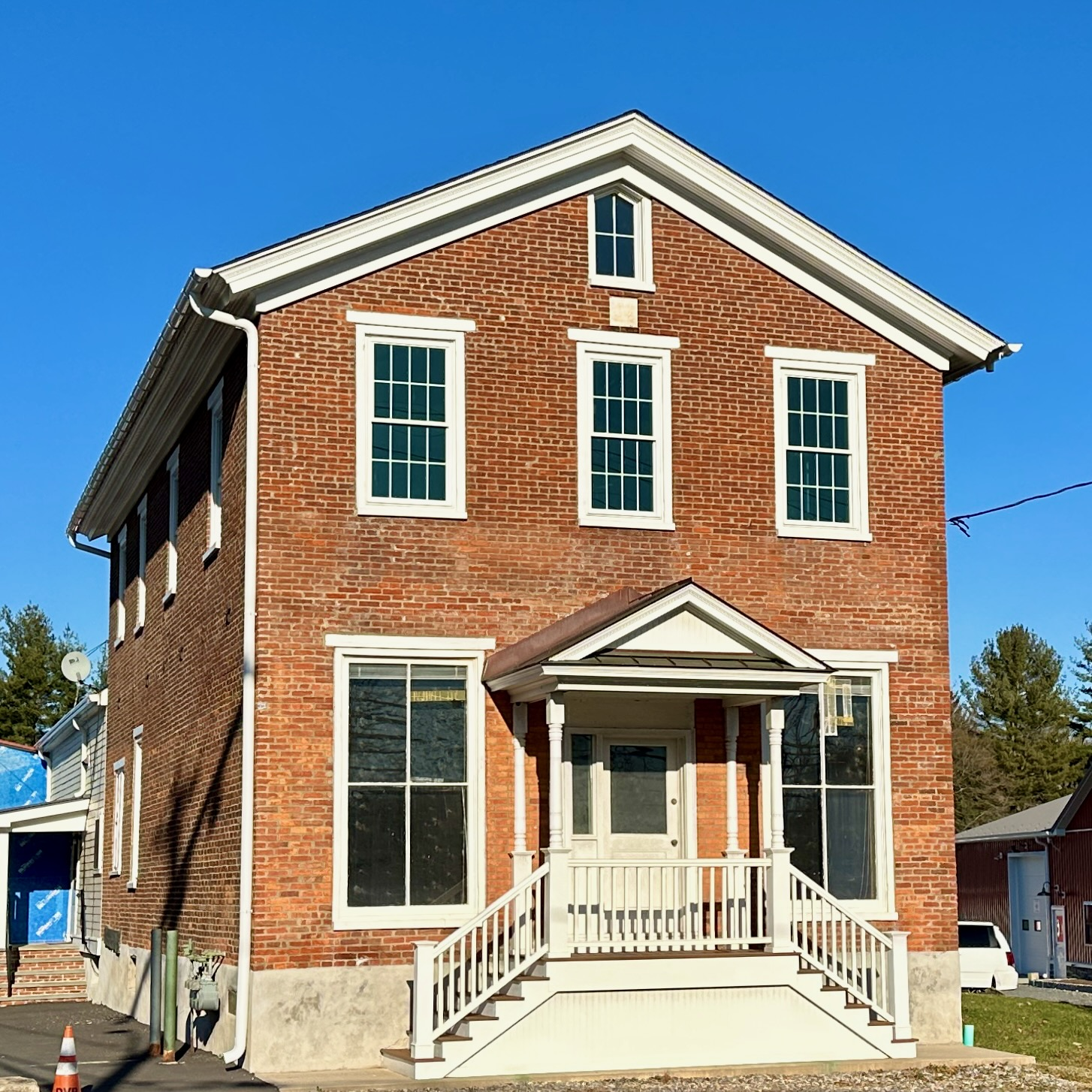
- Former New Market Store, part of the New Market–Linvale–Snydertown Historic District

- Location of Linvale in Hunterdon County Inset: Location of county within the state of New Jersey Linvale (New Jersey) Linvale (the United States)
- Coordinates: 40°23′35″N 74°50′09″W
- Country: United States
- State: New Jersey
- County: Hunterdon
- Township: East Amwell and West Amwell
- Elevation: 295 ft (90 m)
- GNIS feature ID: 877814

Linvale is an unincorporated community located along the border of East Amwell and West Amwell townships in Hunterdon County, New Jersey, United States. The community was historically known as New Market.

== History ==
The two-story brick New Market Store was first built around 1770 and rebuilt in 1866. The Linvale United Methodist Church, historically known as the New Market Methodist Episcopal Church, was built in 1858.

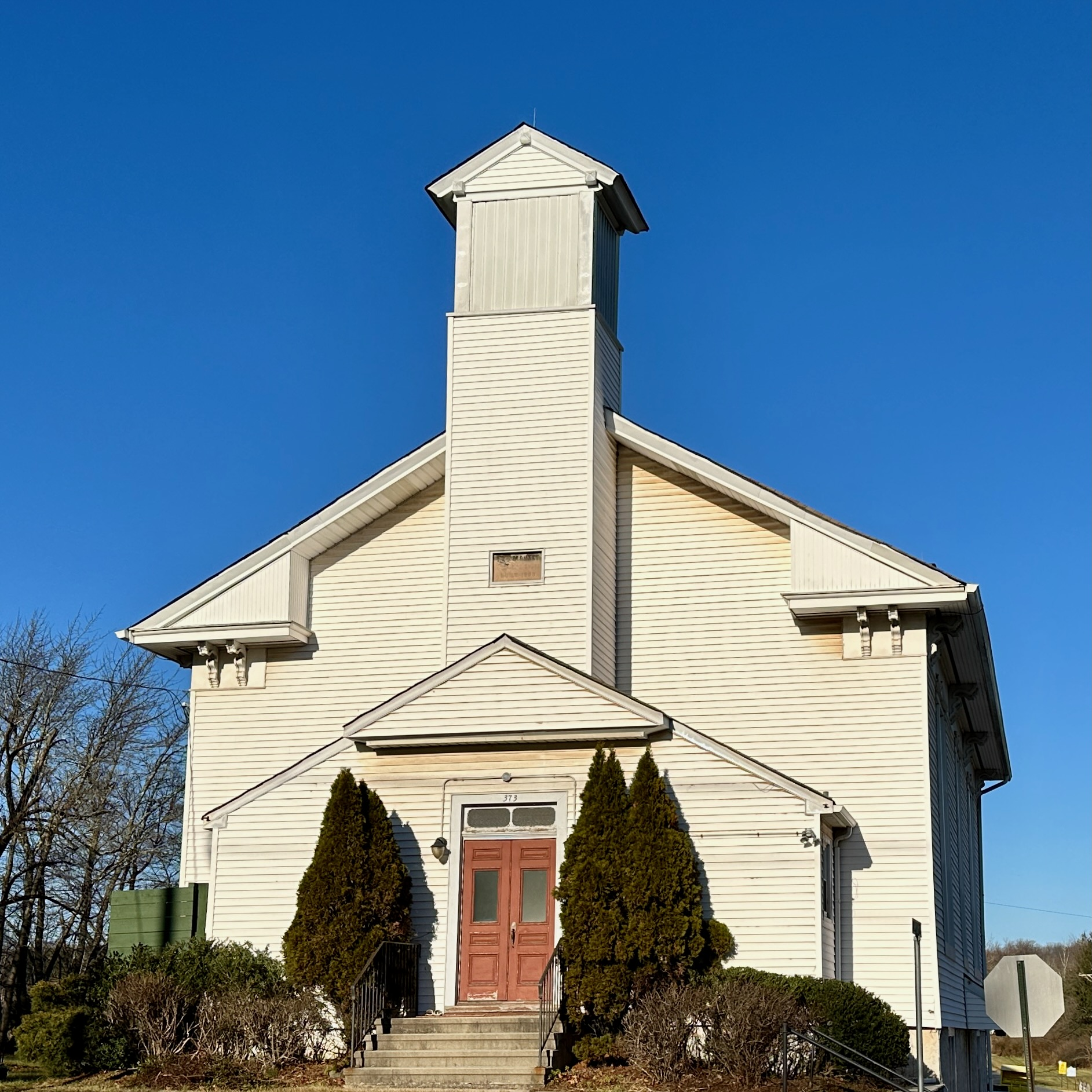
Linvale United Methodist Church

== Historic district ==
The New Market–Linvale–Snydertown Historic District encompassing the community was added to the National Register of Historic Places in 1998 for its significance in architecture, commerce, settlement, and community development.
