= Flagtown, New Jersey =

Populated place in Somerset County, New Jersey, US

- Census-designated place
- Welcome sign

- Location in Somerset County Location in New Jersey Location in the United States
- Coordinates: 40°31′01″N 74°41′04″W
- Country: United States
- State: New Jersey
- County: Somerset
- Township: Hillsborough

Area
  - Total: 1.72 sq mi (4.45 km^{2})
  - Land: 1.71 sq mi (4.42 km^{2})
  - Water: 0.012 sq mi (0.03 km^{2})

Population (2020)
  - Total: 1,070
  - Density: 626.6/sq mi (241.93/km^{2})
- Time zone: UTC−05:00 (Eastern (EST))
  - Summer (DST): UTC−04:00 (Eastern (EDT))
- FIPS code: 34-23610

Flagtown is an unincorporated community and census-designated place located within Hillsborough Township, in Somerset County, in the U.S. state of New Jersey.

As of the 2020 census, Flagtown had a population of 1,070.

== History ==
In 1850 prior to any railroads coming through the area a Somerset County map refers to the area as Flaggtown. Later in 1873 the South Branch Railroad cut through the area just north of the present Lehigh Valley Railroad line and the Easton and Amboy Railroad was built (currently the Lehigh Valley Railroad line that is still active). The area to the north of the railroads was referred to as Flaggtown Station while the area to the south maintained the name Flaggtown. At this point only one train station was marked on the map west of South Branch road between the two rail lines. Finally by 1891 Flaggtown Station is no longer indicated on any maps and Flaggtown is consistently printed as Flagtown on maps. By 1891 two train stations are indicated on USGS maps, one for each line, both just west of South Branch Road. No remains of either station exist today. The name change was initiated by the US Post Office dealing with the confusion of having a Flaggtown next to Flaggtown Station. On January 28th 1878 Flaggtown was renamed Frankfort and Flagtown Station became Flagtown. It's not clear why the "g" was dropped.

The name Flagtown was a corruption of the original Flaggtown. The original Flaggtown (later renamed Frankfort, when Flagtown Station became Flagtown) was named for Jacob Flagg, who purchased a tract in 1700. Some years later, J. Flagg, a descendant and proprietor of a local tavern had it used as headquarters for the Hillsborough Company in the American Revolutionary War. At election time, the tavern served as a voting place. The first school was built there about 1725 on a knoll near the future site of the railroad station and it is said that William Parrish taught there. When the building was replaced in 1795, it was painted red and white and called "The Old Red School House."

== Demographics ==
Historical population
Census	Pop.	Note	%±
2020	1,070		—
U.S. Decennial Census; 2020

Flagtown first appeared as a census designated place in the 2020 U.S. census.

Flagtown CDP, New Jersey – Racial and ethnic composition Note: the US Census treats Hispanic/Latino as an ethnic category. This table excludes Latinos from the racial categories and assigns them to a separate category. Hispanics/Latinos may be of any race.
Race / Ethnicity (NH = Non-Hispanic)	Pop 2020	2020
White alone (NH)	830	77.57%
Black or African American alone (NH)	12	1.12%
Native American or Alaska Native alone (NH)	0	0.00%
Asian alone (NH)	102	9.53%
Native Hawaiian or Pacific Islander alone (NH)	0	0.00%
Other race alone (NH)	5	0.47%
Mixed race or Multiracial (NH)	38	3.55%
Hispanic or Latino (any race)	83	7.76%
Total	1,070	100.00%

As of 2020, the area had a population of 1,070.

== Postal service ==
Flagtown has its own post office (ZIP code 08821) but no house-to-house mailbox delivery, therefore residents have no other option than to have a P.O. box address. Some residents (on the main streets, not the side streets) have the option to have home delivery if they accept Hillsborough as their postal address. Prior to the establishment of the Hillsborough post office, Neshanic had covered partial Flagtown home delivery. The Flagtown post office is small (despite some expansion work done within the last 10 years), and usually staffed by one or two workers at any given time, who take care of all jobs themselves. It can be uncomfortably crowded in the p.o. box foyer/window area if a mere 4-5 customers are in line, or retrieving mail from their boxes. There's very limited parking, as the post office is part of an apartment/storefront, sharing the building with a small local deli and two residential apartments. A gas station/car repair shop, a separate building, shares the parking lot.

During the 4th of July and Flag Day, the Flagtown post office has an inordinate amount of extra mail than normal because there is no "Flagtown" in any other states, therefore people come from afar to drop off their outgoing postcards and letters to be hand-canceled by Flagtown on days relating to the flag, making the cancellation name and date a unique souvenir.

== Fire Department ==
Despite the small size of Flagtown, they have their own volunteer fire department, the Hillsborough Volunteer Fire Co. No. 1. They have been known for years for having green fire trucks rather than the typical red, often referred to as "Mean and Green." They were originally pine green, but the more modern trucks are a fluorescent lime green, almost yellow, making them instantly stand out and recognizable.

The Flagtown Fire Department was the first fire company formed in the township of Hillsborough, the largest township in the county of Somerset, state of New Jersey. In 1937, seven members of the Township Board of Trade decided that Hillsborough needed its own fire company, and on May 27, 1938, the Hillsborough Volunteer Fire Company No. 1 received its charter. They purchased its first fire truck that same year, a used chemical engine; nine years later they bought a surplus army fire truck. The trucks had originally been housed in a garage at the Clawson Machine Shop for eight years, but in 1946 they built a firehouse for the trucks. Lumber for the building was donated by Doris Duke, the tobacco heiress (who lived in the area), and the building has been added to and restructured over the years to house more trucks and meet the needs of the department.

Santa rides around Flagtown on a fire truck near Christmas time, using the PA system and stopping to give toys and candy to children on the block.

== Notable people ==
People who were born in, residents of, or otherwise closely associated with Flagtown include:

- Sylvia Dubois (1788/89–1888), an enslaved, then free, woman
- Emanuel Ninger (1846/47–1924), counterfeiter in the late 1880s
