= Sourland Mountain =

Geological formation in New Jersey, US

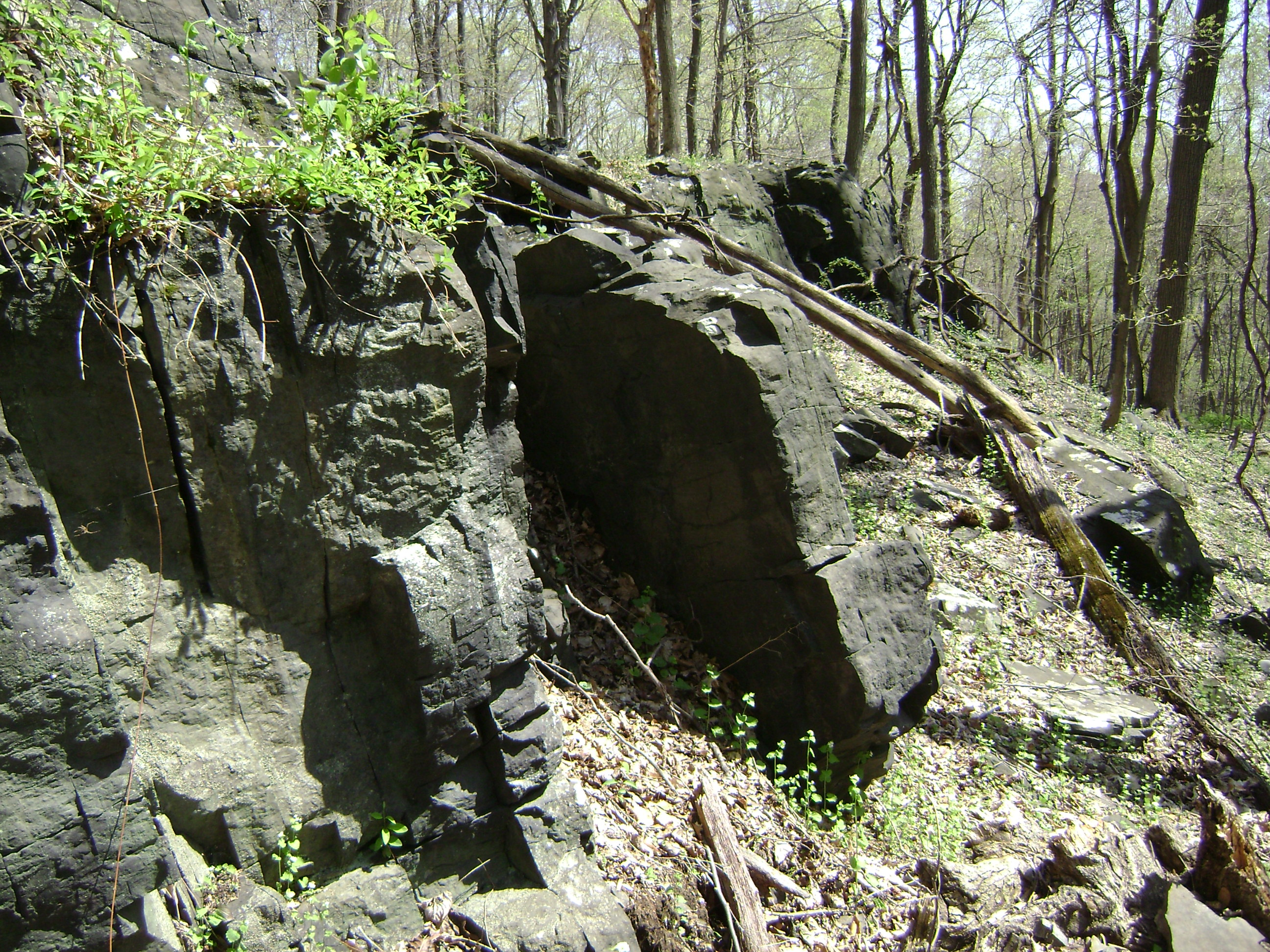
- A ledge containing argillite hornfels visible on the east flank of Sourland Mountain in Hillsborough Twp.

Highest point
- Peak: Northernmost peak
- Elevation: 568 ft (173 m)
- Coordinates: 40°28′44.95″N 74°42′39.53″W

Dimensions
- Length: 17 mi (27 km) north–south

Geography
- Country: United States of America
- State: New Jersey

Geology
- Rock ages: Triassic and Jurassic
- Rock types: intrusive igneous, extrusive igneous and trap rock

Sourland Mountain is a 17-mile-long (27 km) ridge in central New Jersey, U.S., extending from the Delaware River at Lambertville to the western end of Hillsborough Township near the community of Neshanic, through Montgomery Township and into Hopewell Township in Mercer County. It comprises the largest contiguous forest in Central Jersey, nearly 90 square miles (233 km^{2}) in area. The highest point is only 568 feet (173 m) above sea level, but the way it rises steeply from the surrounding farmland has earned it the title of 'mountain'. The ridge itself sits within a larger area of rough terrain called The Sourlands.

== Toponymy ==
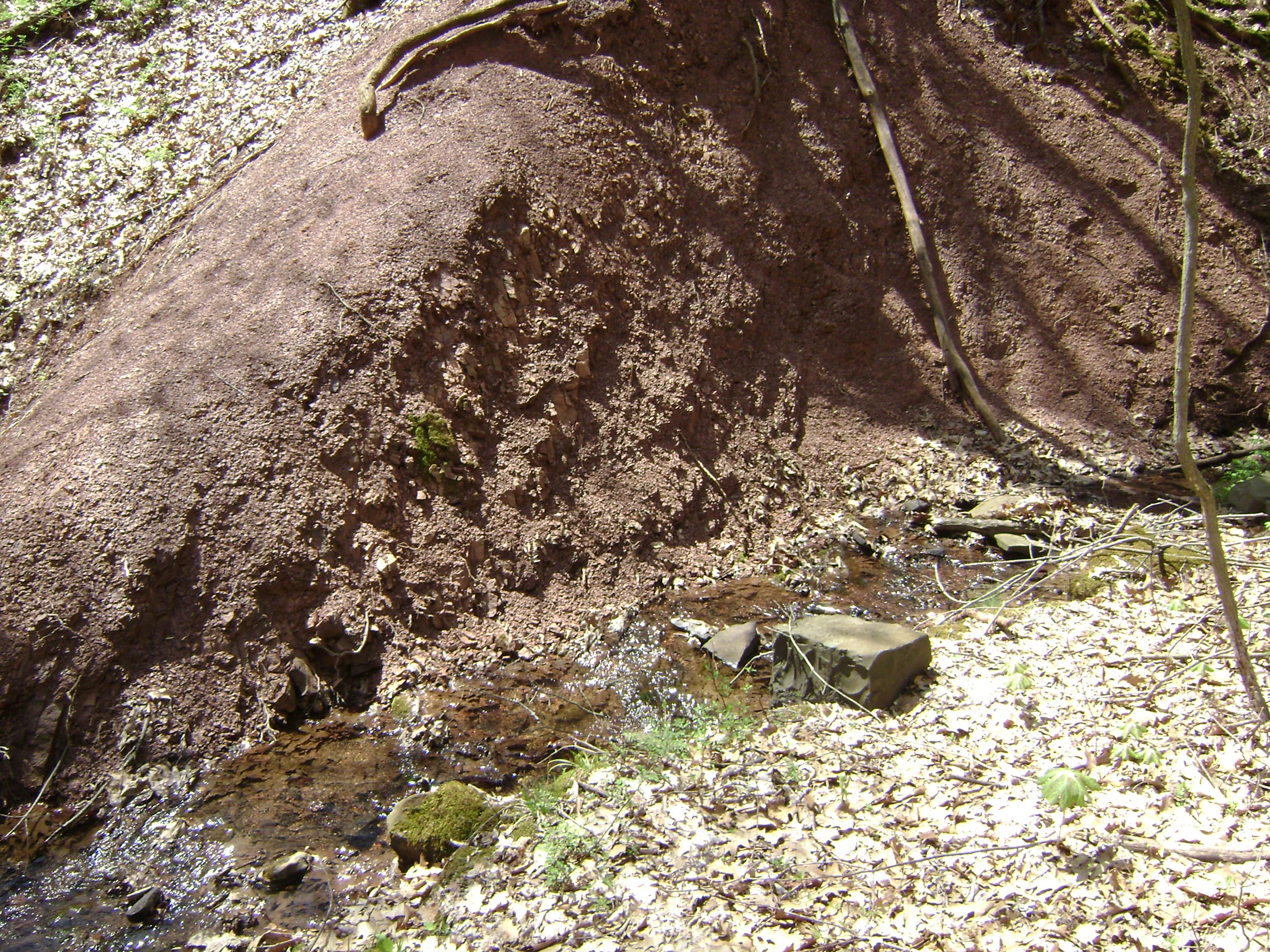
The reddish brown soil of Sourland Mountain.

The origin of the name Sourland is unclear and a few theories exist. It could be derived from the term “sorrel-land” which describes the sorrel (reddish-brown) colored shale-bearing soils encountered by the pioneering German farmers, or German immigrants from the Sauerland region simply anglicized the name of their home region. Another possible source for the name is from 17th century Dutch settlers who referred to the region as "sauer landt" because the region was clearly not suitable for farming. To this day, the area remains relatively undeveloped - besides being unsuitable for farming, the hard igneous rock, nonporous clay soils, steep slopes and perched wetlands create groundwater conditions which make the area difficult for drilling wells and installing septic systems.

== History ==
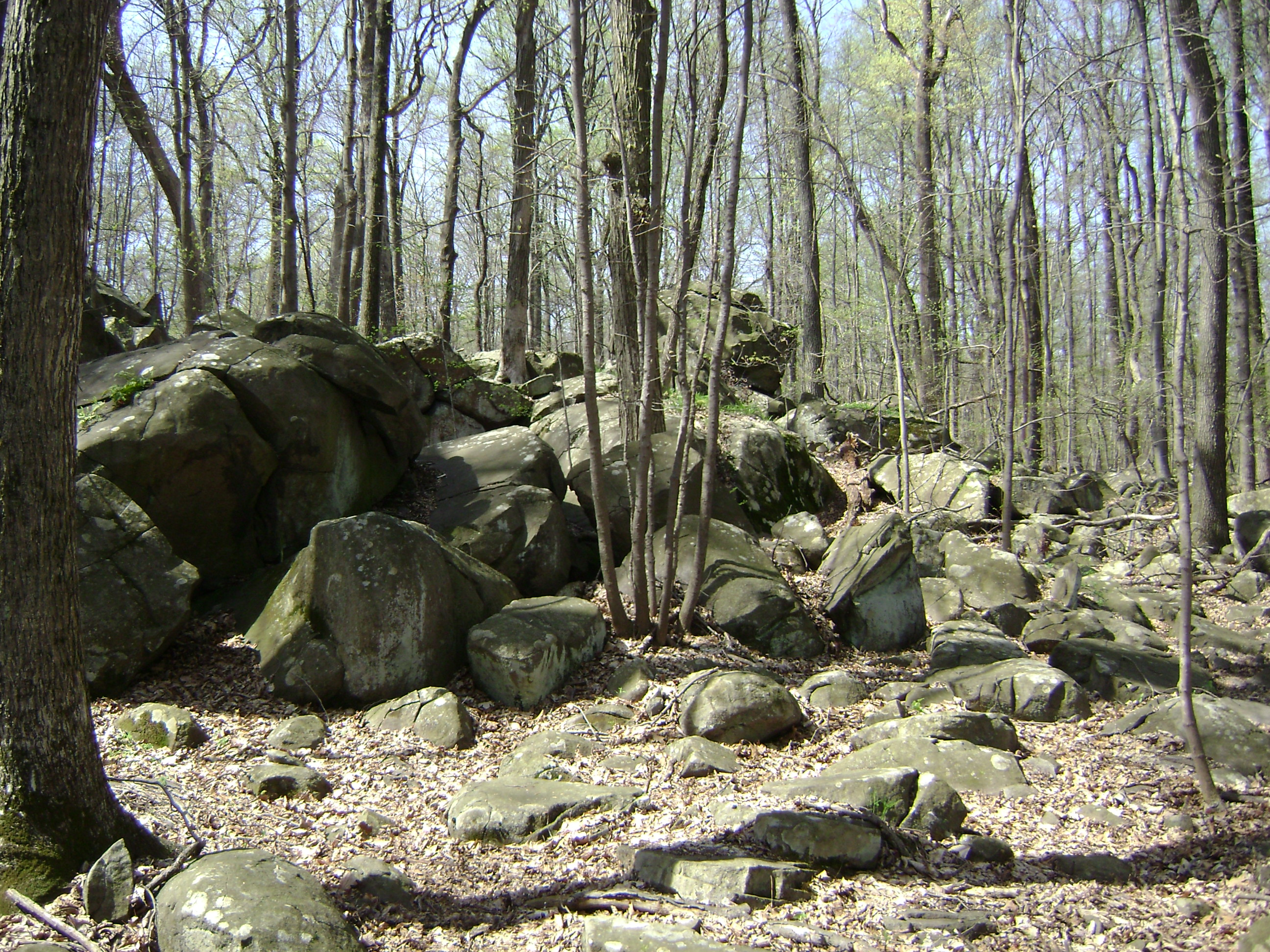
Early farmers had to contend with the mountain's boulder strewn slopes.

Before the arrival of Europeans, Sourland Mountain was inhabited by Unami speaking Lenape, in particular the Musconetcongs. However, settlements and farms along the mountain seem to have been restricted to river valleys due to the poor, rocky soils upslope. There is evidence indicating the Delaware River likely supported at least one such Lenape settlement at the southern foot of the mountain around present-day Lambertville, New Jersey.

In the 18th and 19th century, the mountain's many streams were heavily exploited as an energy source for various mills. At the same time, Sourland Mountain became a valuable source of lumber. However, by the time of the Civil War, most of the forests that had previously covered the mountain had been depleted. In place of these forests, farms sprang up along the more easily managed parts of the mountain, and rural villages were formed. Rock quarries and a local pottery industry were also started around this time.

By the end of the 19th century, Sourland Mountain supported a thriving peach farming industry. But a blight just before the start of the new century, as well as a statewide shift to an industrial economy, eventually crippled agriculture on the mountain. Rural villages soon disappeared, and new forests began to grow over abandoned farmland. The only pre-20th century industry that was able to survive into the modern era was rock quarrying –the mountain's trap rock was crushed and used to build railroad beds and roads throughout the region.

For the first half of the 20th century, Sourland Mountain remained a remote part of New Jersey, with few connections to nearby metropolitan areas. This changed in the 1940s when new road construction made the mountain more accessible, allowing suburbia to begin invading its valleys and slopes. Today the mountain acts as a watershed for surrounding communities, while at the same time providing recreational opportunities to Central New Jersey.

== Geography ==
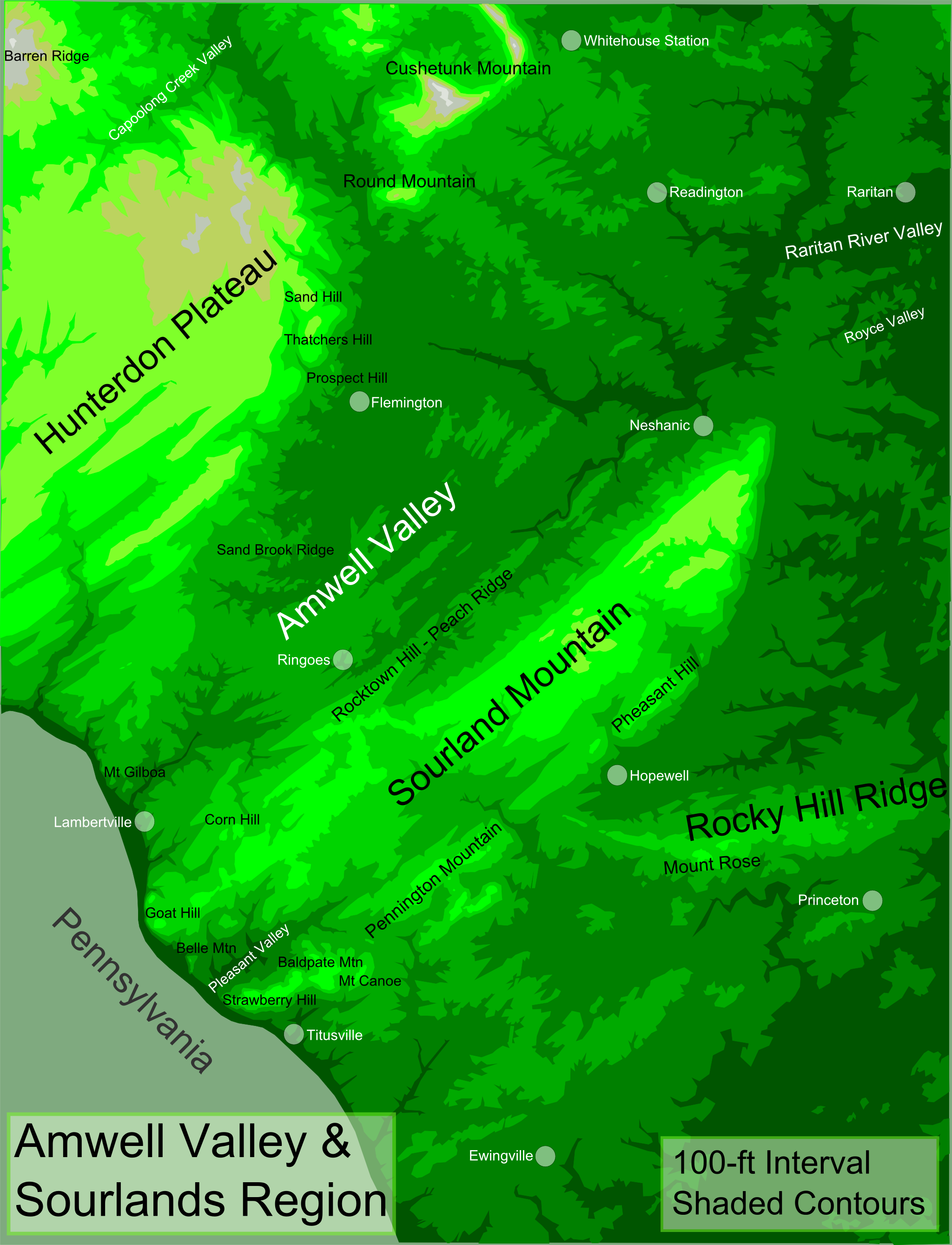
Topographic map depicting Sourland Mountain and surrounding area.

As a range, Sourland Mountain includes the main ridge and smaller secondary ridges. Near the northern part of the range, Pheasant Hill forms a parallel rise on the east flank of the main ridge. South of Pheasant Hill, a somewhat detached ridge forms Pennington Mountain. This same ridge, which continues to run parallel to the main ridge, is broken in three more places south of Pennington Mountain, forming (from north to south) Mount Canoe, Baldpate Mountain, and Strawberry Hill. A knob in the shallow valley between Strawberry Hill and the southernmost stretch of the main ridge forms Belle Mountain. Goat Hill comprises the highest point of the main ridge before reaching the southernmost end of Sourland Mountain at the Delaware River. Partly adjacent to Sourland Mountain is a sizeable traprock ridge which extends eastward from Pennington Mountain for approximately nine miles, forming (from west to east) Mount Rose, Rocky Hill, and Ten Mile Run Mountain. West of the main ridge, near Flemington, is Prospect Hill, a volcanic remnant lying along the western edge of the Amwell Valley. The hill appears to be geologically linked to Sourland Mountain by a volcanic dike running mostly beneath the surface.

== Geology ==
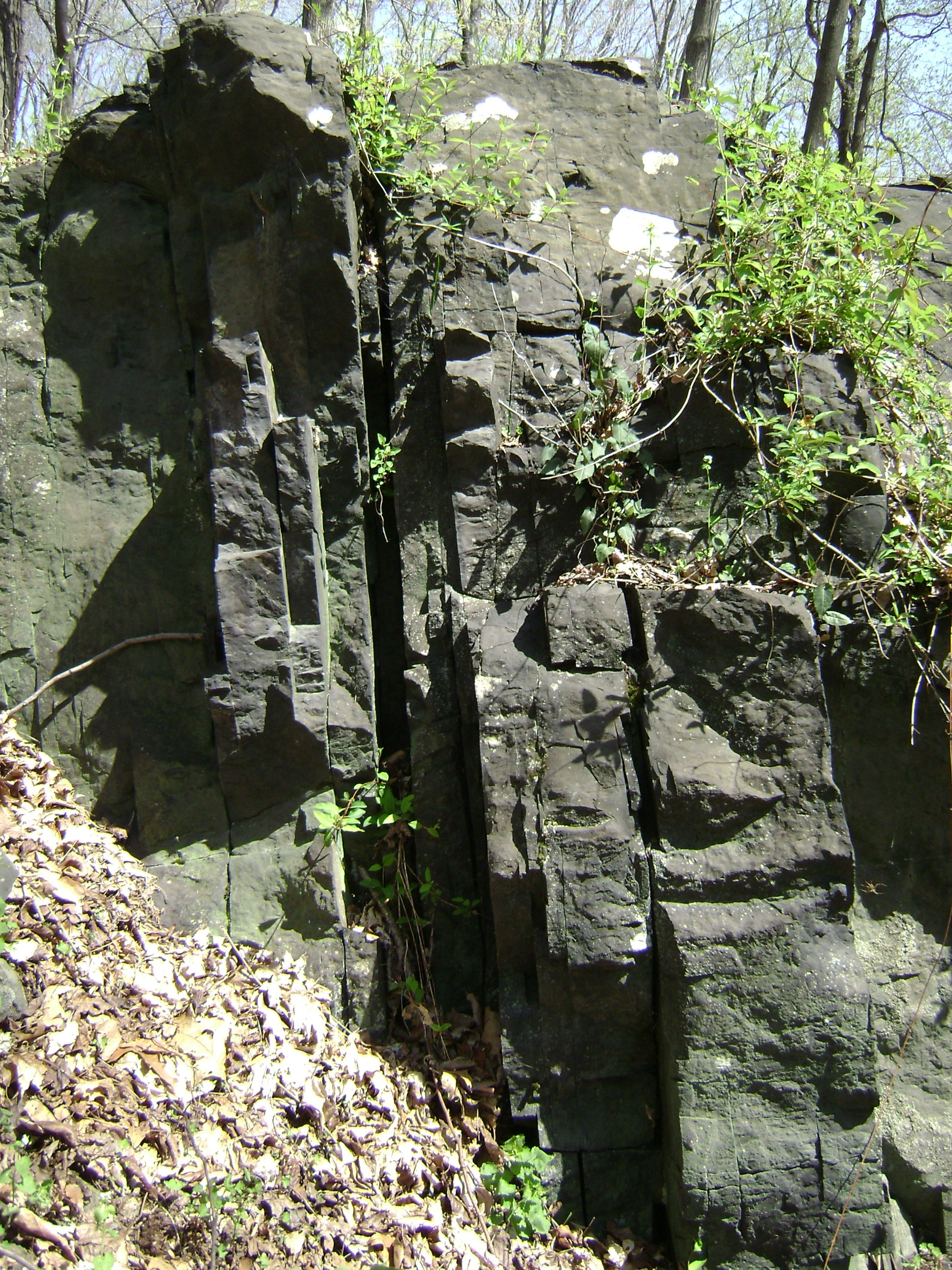
Hornfels is common on Sourland Mountain due to the extensive baking of local rock that occurred as a result of igneous intrusions.

Sourland Mountain was formed 200 million years ago by a plutonic intrusion of a hard igneous rock, diabase, into the Brunswick Shale. The intrusion occurred as tectonic forces created the Newark Basin, a prehistoric rift valley active near the rift which ultimately spread North America and Africa apart. The parallel ridges of the mountain were probably formed by magma seeping up through linear faults created during the rifting process

During the early Jurassic the rift which formed the Newark Basin failed, and the intrusion which would eventually become Sourland Mountain ceased growing. Initially, the vast majority of volcanic material remained within the crust. However, the diabase and related hornfels which form the backbone of the mountain are a type of highly erosion resistant stone known as trap rock. Consequently, millions of years of erosion lowered the more easily worked shale surrounding the intrusion, turning it into the elevated ridges which currently comprise Sourland Mountain.

The Palisades Sill, in northeastern New Jersey and southeastern New York, was not only formed under similar circumstances to Sourland Mountain, it is at least partly contiguous with it. The ridge forming Mount Rose, Rocky Hill, and Ten Mile Run Mountain, is a continuation of the Palisades which connects to Pennington Mountain. South of Pennington Mountain the Palisades sill and Sourland Mountain's eastern ridge are essentially the same feature.

Like the Palisades, Sourland Mountain exhibits volcanic dikes which extend away from the main ridge. One such dike extending northwest from Sourland Mountain has been determined to be responsible for the creation of Prospect Hill, an extrusive basalt peak near Flemington, New Jersey. Prospect Hill marks the only known location where Sourland Mountain's magma actually erupted to the surface. In this respect, it is similar to Snake Hill, which it most likely a volcanic plug linked to the Palisades.

One of the key differences between Sourland Mountain and the other volcanic mountains of the Newark Basin, including the Watchungs and the Palisades, is that it has not been touched by glaciers. This has left the mountain with a mantle of Triassic argillite, which covers much of the underlying trap rock and comprises the bulk of Pheasant Hill. The impermeability of argillite is primarily to blame for Sourland Mountain's extremely poor aquifer.

== Wildlife ==
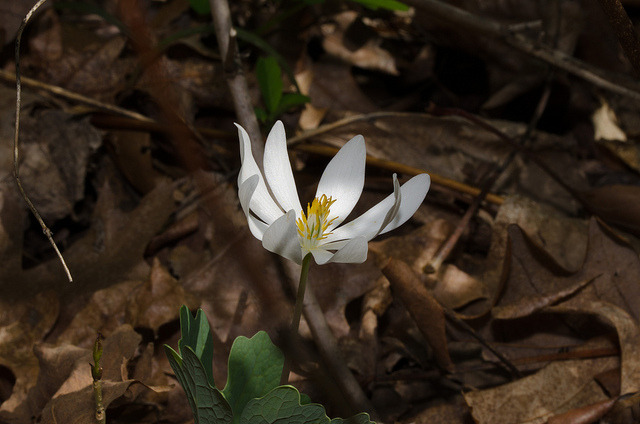
Bloodroot (Sanguinaria canadensis) in the Sourland Mountain Range

Sourland Mountain is in the Northeastern coastal forests ecoregion It is an environmentally sensitive area and is home to several rare and threatened plants and animals, including: trout lilies, wood anemones, ginseng, spotted salamander, pileated woodpecker, bobcat, wood turtle, barred owl, bobolink, Cooper's hawk, grasshopper sparrow, Savannah sparrow, upland sandpiper, and the scarlet tanager.

The Sourlands serve as a stopover area for migratory birds that travel between South and Central America and the Arctic as well as forest birds migrating between Washington, D.C., and Boston. The area also supports a large population of deep-woods birds such as scarlet tanagers and barred owls.

Being the largest contiguous forest between the Pine Barrens and the New Jersey Highlands, it is critical to the survival of neotropical migrant birds and other rare species of plants and animals. D&R Greenway Land Trust's partner in Mexico, Amigos de Calakmul, protects bird habitat at the southern end of the migratory flyway.

== Recreation ==
Small parks and access points make the mountain popular for hiking, mountain biking, hunting, and bird watching. Rock climbing is permitted in certain parks such as Sourland Mountain Preserve in Somerset County, but not in others such as Sourland Mountain Nature Preserve in Hunterdon County. The largest park is the Sourland Mountain Preserve in Somerset County. Nearby is the Sourland Mountain Nature Preserve, located in Hunterdon County.

== Notable inhabitants ==
Notable residents of the Mountain include: playwrights Eugene O'Neill, aviator Charles Lindbergh, patriot John Hart (signer of the Declaration of Independence), the painter George Bellows, and freed slave and tavern owner Sylvia Dubois.

In March 1932, the mountain was the scene of the notorious kidnapping and murder of the Lindbergh baby. The Lindberghs had chosen the mountain for their new home precisely because of its isolation and inaccessibility.
