= Mount Rose =

Mount Rose may refer to:

- Mount Rose (Washington), a summit in the Olympic Mountains
- Mount Rose Station, a cancelled hotel and casino next to The Summit in Reno, Nevada
- Mount Rose (Nevada), a mountain peak in Washoe County, Nevada
  - Mount Rose Ski Tahoe, a recreational ski resort in Nevada
  - Mount Rose Summit, a mountain pass on Nevada State Route 431
  - Mount Rose Weather Observatory, a historic observatory on the summit
  - Mount Rose Wilderness, protected wilderness area in the Carson Range
- Mount Rose (New Jersey), a section of the Rocky Hill Ridge in Mercer County, New Jersey
- Mount Rose, New Jersey, a section of Hopewell Township, Mercer County, New Jersey

== See also ==
- Rose Mountain (disambiguation)
- Rose Peak (disambiguation)
