= Kennedy Meadows =

Kennedy Meadows may refer to:

- Kennedy Meadows (Tulare), a portion of the Kern Plateau in Tulare County, California
- Kennedy Meadows (CDP), a census-designated place in Tulare County, California
- Kennedy Meadows Campground, on the Kern Plateau in the Sequoia National Forest
- Kennedy Meadows in the Sonora Pass region of central California
