= Sherman Pass =

Sherman Pass may refer to:

- Sherman Pass (California) in the southern Sierra Nevada
- Sherman Pass (Washington) in the Kettle River Range
  - Sherman Pass Scenic Byway, a portion of Washington State Route 20
