= J. Cecil Alter =

American meteorologist and historian (1879–1964)

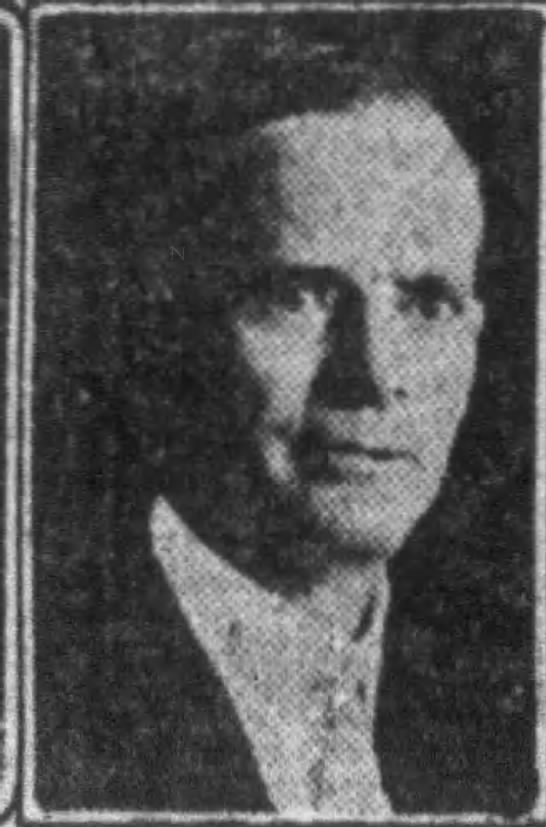
- Alter in 1926
- Born: March 31, 1879; Rensselaer, Indiana, U.S.
- Died: May 20, 1964 (aged 85); Los Angeles, California, U.S.
- Education: Valparaiso University; Northern Indiana Teachers' Institute; Purdue University
- Occupation: meteorologist
- Spouses: Jennie O. Greene (m. 1904): Matis M. Alter

J. Cecil Alter (March 31, 1879 – May 20, 1964) was an American meteorologist, historian, and editor of the Utah Historical Quarterly. He moved to Salt Lake City in 1902 to work for the Salt Lake Weather Bureau, where he became the founder of a mountain snow survey system for anticipating streamflow.

== Early life ==
Alter was born on March 31, 1879, in Rensselaer, Indiana to parents John E. and Hattie (McColly) Alter. His father was a farmer, civil engineer, surveyor, and school teacher, which Alter also held positions in although he never stayed in school very long. After attending Valparaiso University, Northern Indiana Teachers Institute, and Purdue University, Alter settled upon meteorology as a career, joining the U.S. Weather Bureau in 1902.

== Career ==
While with the U.S. Weather Bureau, Alter was stationed in Salt Lake City, where he met his future wife Jennie O. Greene. He stayed there until 1941, with brief assignments across the United States including Medford, Oregon, and Cheyenne, Wyoming. Alter's experience led him to be placed in charge of various Weather Bureau exhibitions including the International Dry Farming Exposition, United States Department of Agriculture, and Panama Pacific International Exposition. He would later be recognized as the founder of a mountain snow survey system for anticipating streamflow. In 1911, Alter and James E. Church were given the responsibility of making systematic snow surveys in Tahoe and the watershed around Great Salt Lake. Independent from one another, they each developed the concept of the "snow course," which is described as "a series of sampling sites strung across a short distance, in order to reduce distortions caused by wind and drift." By 1917, Alter was given control of the Weather Bureau station in Salt Lake City.

In his final year with the Weather Bureau station in Salt Lake City, Alter spent three months at the Central Weather Bureau in Washington, DC studying the latest scientific advances in meteorology. In August 1941, Alter left Salt Lake City to take charge of the weather and flood warning service in Cincinnati, Ohio. Alter eventually retired in 1949, being replaced by John H. Eberly, and died in 1964 in Los Angeles.

=== Beyond meteorology ===
Beyond meteorology, Alter became interested in the history of Utah and published several publications. As chairman of the Utah State Parks Commission, he wrote for two local newspaper columns and published four books; Jim Bridger, Trapper, Frontiersman, Scout, and Guide: A Historical Narrative (1925), Through the Heart of the Scenic West (1927), Storied Domain (1932), and Early Utah Journalism. His final book, Early Utah Journalism, was based entirely on historical material from the Utah State Historical Society Publications. Alter was also appointed chairman of the Chamber's Smokeless City Committee in 1925, having previously written reports about the cities smoke pollution.

During his stay in Utah, Alter was an honorary and life member of the Utah Historical Society and served as editor of the Utah Historical Quarterly. He continued his position as editor even after leaving the city for Ohio.
