= South Sierra Wilderness =

Protected wilderness area in California, United States

- IUCN category Ib (wilderness area)
- Location within California Location within the United States
- Interactive map of South Sierra Wilderness
- Location: Tulare and Inyo counties, California, United States
- Nearest city: Ridgecrest, California
- Coordinates: 36°11′01″N 118°06′03″W
- Area: 62,700 acres (254 km^{2})
- Established: 1984
- Governing body: United States Forest Service

The South Sierra Wilderness is a federally designated wilderness area in the Southern Sierra Nevada, in eastern California. It is located 65 miles (105 km) northeast of Bakersfield, and is southwest of Owens Lake and Olancha.

== Geography ==
Created with the passage of the California Wilderness Act of 1984 by the U.S. Congress, the South Sierra Wilderness is 62,700 acres (254 km^{2}) in size. It is managed by the U.S. Forest Service, and within Sequoia National Forest and Inyo National Forest.

The South Sierra Wilderness is the southernmost Forest Service-managed section of a continuous chain of wilderness areas protecting the Sierra Nevada crest from Walker Pass to Lake Tahoe.

Elevations range from about 6,100 feet (1,900 m) near Kennedy Meadows, up to 12,132 feet (3,698 m) at Olancha Peak. The Wild and Scenic South Fork of the Kern River bisects the wilderness on the east side, in a north–south direction.

== Ecology ==
Wildlife includes the large Monache mule deer herd, the sensitive Sierra Nevada red fox, pine martens, mountain lions, and American black bears. The South Fork of the Kern River serves as the primary native habitat for the California Golden Trout (Oncorhynchus mykiss aguabonita), the state fish of California.

=== Flora ===
Two very different landscapes with distinct habitats are protected within the South Sierra Wilderness:

- The southern portion is the lower Kern Plateau landform, with low, forested ridges, narrow meadows, and woodlands of Jeffrey pine (Pinus jeffreyi), red fir (Abies magnifica) and lodgepole pine (Pinus contorta).
- The northern portion is more mountainous, and includes the alpine flora of Olancha Peak and Round Mountain.

Rare California native plants observed in the area are Kern ceanothus (Ceanothus pinetorum), a locally endemic shrub found on slopes in pine and red fir forests, at elevations between 5,000 and 9,000 feet (1,500 and 2,700 m). Ceanothus pinetorum is not currently state or federally listed under the Endangered Species Act, but is considered by the California Native Plant Society as "uncommon enough that their status should be monitored regularly".

Rare wildflowers include Kern Canyon clarkia (Clarkia xantiana ssp. parviflora) and goosefoot yellow violet (Viola pinetorum ssp. grisea), both are also endemic to California.

== Recreational activities ==
Recreational activities include backpacking, day hiking, fishing, rock climbing, mountaineering, skiing and snowshoeing. The majority of trail users are summer grazing allotment permittees, and autumn hunters.

=== Hiking trails ===
There are six trailheads leading into the wilderness, and one campground, Kennedy Meadows, providing access to:

- the Pacific Crest Trail.
- the Wildrose Trail — 9 miles (14 km) in length and travels through pinyon pine forests.
- the Olancha Pass Trail — starts at the Sage Flat Trailhead on the eastside and is six miles (9.7 km) in length.

== See also ==
- Flora of the Sierra Nevada
- Protected areas of the Sierra Nevada
- Fauna of the Sierra Nevada
