= Bull Fire =

2010 wildfire in California

- Part of the 2010 California wildfires
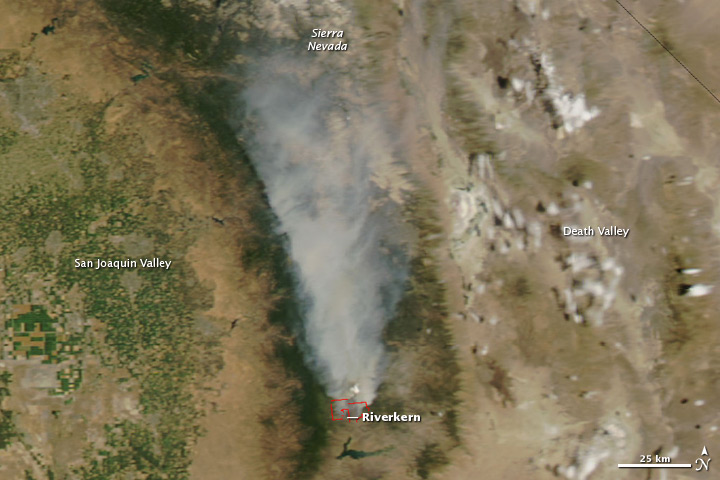
- NASA MODIS satellite photo from July 27, 2010 showing the smoke plumes from the fire.
- Date: July 26, 2010 –; August 10, 2010
- Location: Sequoia National Forest; Kern, California

Statistics
- Burned area: 16,442 acres (66.54 km^{2})

Impacts
- Structures destroyed: 14

Ignition
- Cause: Human Caused

The Bull Fire was a wildfire that scorched 16,442 acres (6,654 ha) of land in Kern County, California, on both sides of the Kern River. The fire, which started on July 26, was the largest wildfire of the 2010 California wildfire season, as well as one of the most destructive with 16 structures being destroyed. By July 29 the fire had burned nearly 16,000 acres (6,500 ha) and was 12% contained.

As the fire approached the cities of Riverkern and Kernville it forced the evacuations of hundreds of residents as well as Camp Erwin Owen, a juvenile detention camp.

It became evident early on that the fire had been caused by humans and investigators sealed off the origin of the fire as a crime scene.
