= Rose Mountain =

Rose Mountain may refer to:

- Rose Mountain, List of mountains in Granite County, Montana
- Rose Mountain, List of mountains in the Golan Heights
- Rose Mountain (Herkimer County, New York)
- Rose Mountain (New York)
- Rose Mountain (1,730 ft or 530 m), Lyndeborough, New Hampshire
- Rose Mountain, fictional mountain on which grows The Bitter Rose in Eternia
- Rose Mountain (album), an album by Screaming Females

== See also ==
- Mount Rose (disambiguation)
- Rose Peak (disambiguation)
