= West Fire =

2010 wildfire in California

- Part of the 2010 California wildfires
- Date: July 27, 2010 –; August 3, 2010
- Location: Kern County, California

Statistics
- Burned area: 1,650 acres (6.7 km^{2})

Impacts
- Structures lost: 50

The West Fire was a wildfire that scorched 1,650 acres (670 ha) of land in Kern County, California. While not one of the largest fires of the 2010 California wildfire season, the West Fire was the most destructive, with 50 structures being destroyed.
