= Mount Rose, New Jersey =

Populated place in Mercer County, New Jersey, US

- Unincorporated community
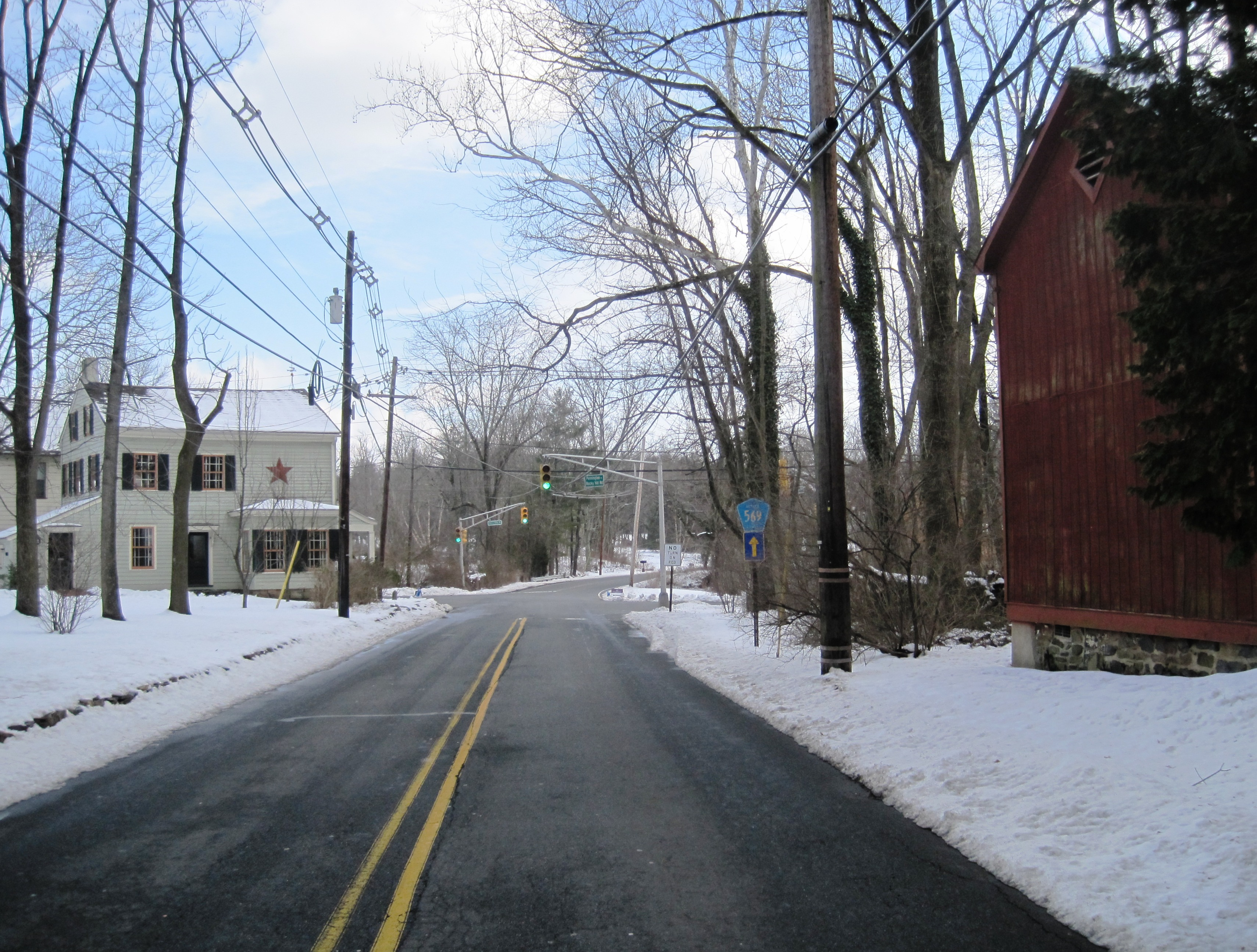
- The center of the community from southbound Carter Road

- Location within Mercer County, New Jersey Location within New Jersey Location within the United States
- Coordinates: 40°22′09″N 74°44′21″W
- Country: United States
- State: New Jersey
- County: Mercer
- Township: Hopewell
- Elevation: 305 ft (93 m)
- ZIP Code: 08540
- GNIS feature ID: 0878583

Mount Rose (formerly called Stout's Corner) is an unincorporated community located within Hopewell Township, in Mercer County, in the U.S. state of New Jersey, situated at the corner of Carter Road (also called County Route 569 and Hopewell-Princeton Road), Pennington-Rocky Hill Road, and Cherry Valley Road. It is named for a local gardener. The Mount Rose section of Rocky Hill Ridge through the community also takes its name from the gardener. Richard Stout opened the first general store in the village around 1822 and in 1830, Josiah Cook and Reuben Savidge opened a second store. The settlement was also later home to two shoe shops, a dressmaker, wheelwrights, a blacksmith, a harness shop, an agricultural implements warehouse, a post office and a steam sawmill. In its heyday the community had about 20 houses. Nathaniel Drake opened an applejack distillery in the village in the mid-19th century. He made and sold peach brandy, apple cider and apple whiskey. The Whiskey House (192 Pennington-Rocky Hill Road), the office building for the distillery and the only remaining Drake building in the village, is listed on the township, state and national registers of historic places. The community's schoolhouse, a stone building east of the crossroads, was later replaced by a frame building on the southern end of the village that is a private residence today. After 1880, Mount Rose began shrinking, due to the growth of nearby Hopewell Borough.

Mount Rose is where the kidnapped and deceased Lindbergh baby was found in May 1932. Charles Lindbergh had lived in Mount Rose while his home was being built.

It is planned that the Lawrence Hopewell Trail will go through the community.

== Education ==
All of Hopewell Township, including Mount Rose, is served by the Hopewell Valley Regional School District.
