= Daggett Pass =

- Location within Nevada

Highest point
- Elevation: 7,343 ft (2,238 m)
- Coordinates: 38°58′36″N 119°53′20″W

Geography
- Location: Douglas County, Nevada, United States
- Parent range: Sierra Nevada

Daggett Pass is a road mountain pass located in the Carson Range, a spur of the Sierra Nevada. It sits at an elevation of 7,343 ft (2,238 m) in Douglas County, Nevada, on the border between the Lake Tahoe Basin Management Unit to the west and the Humboldt-Toiyabe National Forest to the east. The mountain pass is traversed by State Route 207 and is frequently referred to as Kingsbury Grade.

== Climate ==
Climate data for Daggett Pass, Nevada, 1991–2020 normals: 7334ft (2235m)
Month	Jan	Feb	Mar	Apr	May	Jun	Jul	Aug	Sep	Oct	Nov	Dec	Year
Mean daily maximum °F (°C)	35.7 (2.1)	36.8 (2.7)	41.7 (5.4)	47.8 (8.8)	56.1 (13.4)	66.5 (19.2)	74.6 (23.7)	73.5 (23.1)	67.1 (19.5)	55.2 (12.9)	43.3 (6.3)	34.8 (1.6)	52.8 (11.6)
Daily mean °F (°C)	29.4 (−1.4)	30.0 (−1.1)	33.7 (0.9)	38.3 (3.5)	45.6 (7.6)	54.5 (12.5)	62.0 (16.7)	61.2 (16.2)	55.3 (12.9)	45.3 (7.4)	35.7 (2.1)	28.6 (−1.9)	43.3 (6.3)
Mean daily minimum °F (°C)	23.1 (−4.9)	23.2 (−4.9)	25.7 (−3.5)	28.8 (−1.8)	35.1 (1.7)	42.4 (5.8)	49.3 (9.6)	49.0 (9.4)	43.6 (6.4)	35.5 (1.9)	28.1 (−2.2)	22.5 (−5.3)	33.9 (1.0)
Average precipitation inches (mm)	3.78 (96)	3.45 (88)	3.61 (92)	1.25 (32)	1.40 (36)	0.60 (15)	0.17 (4.3)	0.40 (10)	0.32 (8.1)	1.02 (26)	1.79 (45)	4.01 (102)	21.8 (554.4)
Average snowfall inches (cm)	22.3 (57)	18.9 (48)	19.7 (50)	6.2 (16)	1.3 (3.3)	0.4 (1.0)	0.0 (0.0)	0.0 (0.0)	trace	1.9 (4.8)	10.7 (27)	23.0 (58)	104.4 (265.1)
Source 1: NOAA
Source 2: XMACIS2 (Snowfall)

== See also ==
- List of Sierra Nevada road passes
