= List of Sierra Nevada road passes =

This is a table of principal paved highway passes on or near the crest of the Sierra Nevada, United States. The road passes are generally listed from north to south, with their elevation and access road.

The California Department of Transportation attempts to keep Donner Summit (Interstate 80, I-80), Echo Summit (U.S. Route 50, US 50) and Carson Pass (State Route 88, SR 88) open year-round. With the notable exception of Mount Rose Summit, maintained by the Nevada Department of Transportation, other passes at higher elevation than these are usually closed during winter, with opening and closure dates varying based on snowfall and available road clearing and repair resources.

Name	Elevation (ft)	Elevation (m)	Coordinates	Access Road	Notes
Fredonyer Pass	5,748	1,752	40°21′35″N 120°52′03″W	SR 36	Approximate boundary with the Cascade Range
Beckwourth Pass	5,212	1,589	39°47′30″N 120°6′28″W	SR 70; Winnemucca Subdivision, Feather River Route (via tunnel)	On the Diamond Mountains spur range Lowest Sierra Crest highway pass
Yuba Pass	6,709	2,045	39°37′03″N 120°29′20″W	SR 49	On Feather River-Yuba River divide, not Sierra Crest
Little Truckee Summit	6,400	1,951	39°30′18″N 120°16′55″W	SR 89	
Donner Summit (Euer Saddle)	7,239	2,206	39°20′24″N 120°20′38″W	I-80	Westbound
Donner Summit (Euer Saddle)	7,227	2,203	39°20′24″N 120°20′38″W	I-80	Eastbound
Donner Pass	7,088	2,160	39°18′52″N 120°19′37″W	Donner Pass Road; Roseville Subdivision, Overland Route (via tunnel)	Also Northern route of the Lincoln Highway and former US 40
Brockway Summit	7,199	2,194	39°15′40″N 120°04′17″W	SR 267	On Truckee River divide, not Sierra Crest
Mount Rose Summit	8,946	2,727	39°18′48″N 119°53′50″W	SR 431	On Carson Range spur highest year round Sierra Nevada highway pass
Spooner Summit	7,158	2,182	39°06′15″N 119°53′50″W	US 50	On Carson Range spur Southern route of the Lincoln Highway
Daggett Pass	7,339	2,237	38°58′36″N 119°53′20″W	SR 207	On Carson Range spur
Echo Summit	7,377	2,249	38°48′47″N 120°01′48″W	US 50	Southern route of the Lincoln Highway
Luther Pass	7,735	2,358	38°47′13″N 119°56′45″W	SR 89	On Carson River-Lake Tahoe divide, not the Sierra Crest
Carson Pass	8,573	2,613	38°41′38″N 119°59′15″W	SR 88; Pacific Crest Trail	
Monitor Pass	8,321	2,536	38°40′32″N 119°37′10″W	SR 89	In Carson River watershed, not Sierra Crest closed in winter
Ebbetts Pass	8,732	2,662	38°32′40″N 119°48′43″W	SR 4 Pacific Crest Trail	Closed in winter
Sonora Pass	9,624	2,933	38°19′40″N 119°38′9″W	SR 108; Pacific Crest Trail	Closed in winter
Tioga Pass	9,943	3,031	37°54′40″N 119°15′29″W	SR 120	Closed in winter Highest Sierra Nevada highway pass.
Minaret Summit	9,175	2,797	37°39′23″N 119°03′37″W	SR 203	Not a trans-Sierra route, road ends west of summit closed in winter
No roads cross the Sierra Crest for 137 miles (220 km) between Minaret Summit and Ninemile Canyon.
Sherman Pass	9,140	2,786	35°59′26″N 118°21′57″W	Sherman Pass Road (Forest Route 22S05)	On the Kern River-South Fork Kern River divide, not the Sierra Crest; Closed in winter
unnamed pass	6,260	1,908	35°51′41″N 118°00′26″W	CR J41; Ninemile Canyon Road/Kennedy Meadow Road	
Walker Pass	5,246	1,599	35°39′47″N 118°01′37″W	SR 178; Pacific Crest Trail	
Tehachapi Summit	4,064	1,239	35°06′08″N 118°16′58″W	SR 58; Mojave Subdivision	Traditionally marks the south end of the Sierra and the northeast end of the Tehachapis, even though it is primarily associated with the latter

== Cancelled plans ==
A number of trans-Sierra highways have been proposed but never constructed or cancelled. These include:

- Minaret Summit Highway, which would have continued State Route 203 from its dead end, was proposed in the 1920s, but the idea was abandoned following the passage of the California Wilderness Act of 1984.
- California State Route 168, the High Sierra Piute Highway, planned to go over Piute Pass; currently two disconnected segments with a gap over the Sierra Nevada
- California State Route 190–currently two disconnected segments with a gap over the Sierra Nevada

== See also ==
- List of mountain passes in California
