= 2010 California wildfires =

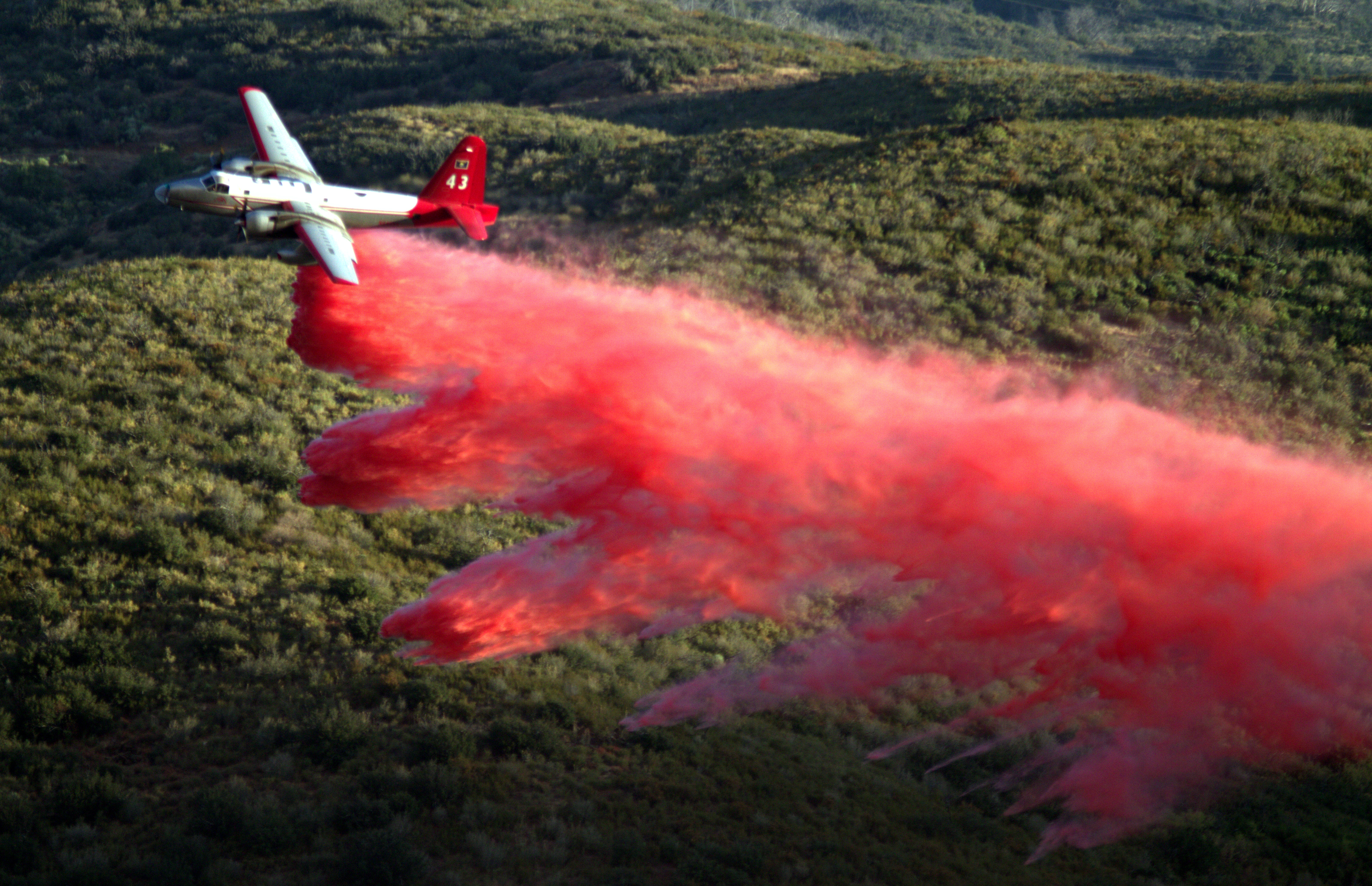

Statistics
- Total fires: 6,554
- Total area: 109,529 acres (443.25 km^{2})

Impacts
- Deaths: None reported
- Injuries: None reported
- Cost: Over $56.2 million (2010 USD)

During 2010, a total of 6,554 wildfires burned 109,529 acres (443.25 km^{2}) of land in the US state of California .

== Background ==
The timing of "fire season" in California is variable, depending on the amount of prior winter and spring precipitation, the frequency and severity of weather such as heat waves and wind events, and moisture content in vegetation. Northern California typically sees wildfire activity between late spring and early fall, peaking in the summer with hotter and drier conditions. Occasional cold frontal passages can bring wind and lightning. The timing of fire season in Southern California is similar, peaking between late spring and fall. The severity and duration of peak activity in either part of the state is modulated in part by weather events: downslope/offshore wind events can lead to critical fire weather, while onshore flow and Pacific weather systems can bring conditions that hamper wildfire growth.

== List of wildfires ==
Below is a list of all fires that exceeded 1,000 acres (4.0 km^{2}) during the 2010 fire season. The list is taken from CAL FIRE's list of large fires.

Name	County	Acres	Km^{2}	Start date	Contained Date (Note: Containment means that fire crews have established and secured control lines around the fire's perimeter. These lines are artificial barriers, like trenches or cleared vegetation, designed to stop the fire's spread, or natural barriers like rivers. Containment reflects progress in managing the fire but does not necessarily mean the fire is starved of fuel, under control, or put out.)	Notes
Cotton	San Luis Obispo	2,044	8.3	May 15, 2010	May 17, 2010	
McKinley	Riverside	1,000	4.0	May 20, 2010	May 22, 2010	
Robinson	Merced	1,600	6.5	June 11, 2010	June 12, 2010	
Aliso	San Diego	3,225	13.1	July 13, 2010	July 13, 2010	
Sand 2	Kern	1,254	5.1	July 16, 2010	July 22, 2010	
Indian	Kern	1,822	7.4	July 18, 2010	July 24, 2010	
Mono	Mono	1,205	4.9	July 26, 2010	July 29, 2010	
Bull	Kern	16,442	66.5	July 26, 2010	August 10, 2010	14 structures destroyed
McDonald	Lassen	9,408	38.1	July 27, 2010	August 10, 2010	
West	Kern	1,650	6.7	July 27, 2010	August 6, 2010	50 structures destroyed
Crown	Los Angeles	13,918	56.3	July 29, 2010	August 3, 2010	10 structures destroyed
Bar	Plumas	1,040	4.2	July 31, 2010	August 10, 2010	
Pozo	San Luis Obispo	1,200	4.9	August 21, 2010	August 22, 2010	
Post	Kern	1,312	5.3	August 25, 2010	August 28, 2010	
Bullard	Yuba	1,307	5.3	August 27, 2010	August 31, 2010	
Bullards	Nevada	1,500	6.1	August 27, 2010	September 13, 2010	
Canyon	Kern	9,820	39.7	September 12, 2010	September 19, 2010	1 structure destroyed
