= Kennedy Meadows (CDP), California =

Kennedy Meadows (CDP)
- Census-designated place
- Location of Kennedy Meadows in Tulare County, California.

- Position in California. Kennedy Meadows (CDP) (the United States)
- Coordinates: 36°00′28″N 118°06′36″W
- Country: United States
- State: California
- County: Tulare

Area
  - Total: 5.823 sq mi (15.081 km^{2})
  - Land: 5.823 sq mi (15.081 km^{2})
  - Water: 0 sq mi (0 km^{2}) 0%
- Elevation: 6,214 ft (1,894 m)

Population (2020)
  - Total: 58
  - Density: 10/sq mi (3.8/km^{2})
- Time zone: UTC-8 (Pacific (PST))
  - Summer (DST): UTC-7 (PDT)
- GNIS feature ID: 2585427

Kennedy Meadows is a census-designated place (CDP) in Tulare County, California, United States, part of the Springville-Johnsondale CCD, and consists of the community surrounding Kennedy Meadows. The CDP is located to the south-east of the Kennedy Meadows Campground. The 2020 United States census reported Kennedy Meadows's population of permanent residents at 58, up from 28 at the 2010 census. The census definition of the area may not precisely correspond to local understanding of the area with the same name.

The Kennedy Meadows area is at approximately 6200 feet elevation. The most common access route is by the steep Sherman Pass Road from U.S. Route 395 near Pearsonville. Other routes are possible but much slower.

Kennedy Meadows sits on the Pacific Crest Trail, 703 miles (1,131 km) from the trail's southern terminus. The Pacific Crest Trail Data Book uses Kennedy Meadows as the dividing point between the dry Southern California section and the high passes of the Sierra Nevada.

== Geography ==
According to the United States Census Bureau, the Kennedy Meadows CDP covers an area of 5.8 sq mi (15 km^{2}), and is geographically located at the coordinates of 36°00'28.0"N 118°06'36.0"W and an altitude of 6,214 ft (1,894 m).

== Demographics ==
Historical population
| Census | Pop. | Note | %± |
|---|---|---|---|
| 2010 | 28 | | — |
| 2020 | 58 | | 107.1% |
U.S. Decennial Census; 1850–1870 1880-1890; 1900 1910 1920; 1930 1940 1950; 1960 1970 1980; 1990 2000 2010

Kennedy Meadow first appeared as a census designated place in the 2010 U.S. census.

The 2020 United States census reported that Kennedy Meadows had a population of 58. The population density was 10.0 inhabitants per square mile (3.9/km^{2}). The racial makeup of Kennedy Meadows was 53 (91%) White, 0 (0%) African American, 1 (2%) Native American, 0 (0%) Asian, 0 (0%) Pacific Islander, 2 (3%) from other races, and 2 (3%) from two or more races. Hispanic or Latino of any race were 3 persons (5%).

The whole population lived in households. There were 33 households, out of which 2 (6%) had children under the age of 18 living in them, 16 (48%) were married-couple households, 4 (12%) were cohabiting couple households, 3 (9%) had a female householder with no partner present, and 10 (30%) had a male householder with no partner present. 12 households (36%) were one person, and 10 (30%) were one person aged 65 or older. The average household size was 1.76. There were 17 families (52% of all households).

The age distribution was 5 people (9%) under the age of 18, 4 people (7%) aged 18 to 24, 7 people (12%) aged 25 to 44, 16 people (28%) aged 45 to 64, and 26 people (45%) who were 65 years of age or older. The median age was 61.5 years. There were 31 males and 27 females.

There were 128 housing units at an average density of 22.0 units per square mile (8.5 units/km^{2}), of which 33 (26%) were occupied. Of these, 20 (61%) were owner-occupied, and 13 (39%) were occupied by renters.

== Education ==
The CDP is served by the Porterville Unified School District for all grade levels, K-12.
