= Rose Peak =

Rose Peak may refer to:

- Rose Peak (Inner Mongolia), China, part of the Arxan–Chaihe Scenic Area, an AAAAA Tourist Attraction of China
- Rose Peak (Shetlands), in the South Shetland Islands
- Rose Peak (California), highest point in Alameda County, California

== See also ==
- Rose Mountain (disambiguation)
- Mount Rose (disambiguation)
