= Walker Pass =

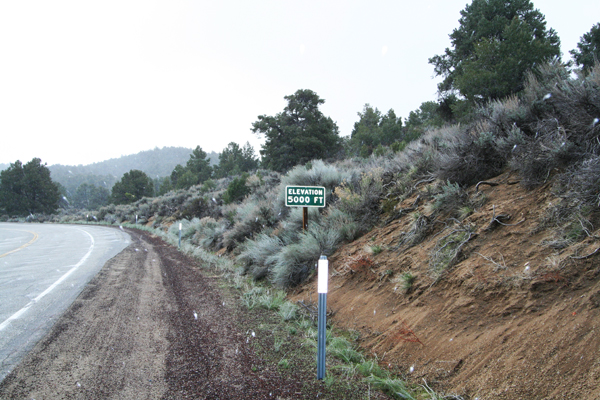
- The approach to Walker Pass

- Location within California
- Elevation: 5,250 ft (1,600 m)
- Traversed by: SR 178

Location
- Location: Sierra Crest, Kern County, California, US
- Range: Sierra Nevada
- Coordinates: 35°39′47″N 118°01′37″W
- Walker Pass
- U.S. National Register of Historic Places
- U.S. National Historic Landmark
- California Historical Landmark
- Nearest city: Ridgecrest, California
- Built: 1834
- NRHP reference No.: 66000210
- CHISL No.: 99

Significant dates
- Added to NRHP: October 15, 1966
- Designated NHL: July 4, 1961

Walker Pass (el. 5,250 ft (1,600 m)) is a mountain pass by Lake Isabella in the southern Sierra Nevada. It is located in northeastern Kern County, approximately 53 mi (85 km) ENE of Bakersfield and 10 mi (16 km) WNW of Ridgecrest. The pass provides a route between the Kern River Valley and San Joaquin Valley on the west, and the Mojave Desert on the east.

Walker Pass is a National Historic Landmark, and is under the stewardship of the Bureau of Land Management.

== History ==
Walker Pass was charted as a route through the Sierra Nevada in 1834 by Joseph Rutherford Walker and Garland Guthary, members of the Bonneville Expedition who learned of it from Native Americans. Walker returned through the pass in 1843, leading an immigrant wagon train into California. In 1845 the military surveying expedition of John C. Fremont used the pass. He suggested it be named after Walker.

Walker Pass was used in 1861 by cattlemen from the San Joaquin Valley and the Tejon region of the Tehachapi mountains to drive cattle to the silver boomtown of Aurora near Mono Lake.

The Walker Pass Lodge was built in nearby Onyx, California in the 1930s, and was a well-known rest stop before burning down around 1990.

Aside from the paved road, the pass is essentially unaltered since Walker mapped it in 1834.

== Description ==
It is the highest point on State Route 178. The pass is also the southernmost crossing along the Sierra Crest, with more southerly Tehachapi Pass traditionally marking the geographic divide between the Sierra Nevada and Tehachapi Mountains.

Between Walker Pass and Tioga Pass, several hours drive to the north, there is only one paved road for automobiles to cross over the Sierra Nevada. It runs from the northern end of Indian Wells Valley at the east, to the hydrologic pass between the Great Basin and the Pacific Ocean at the top of the Nine-Mile Canyon road, then west along the Sherman Pass Road.

All roads between Walker Pass and Carson Pass (State Route 88), over 200 miles (320 km) in distance, are subject to extended closure by winter snowfall. Walker Pass is sometimes closed due to snowfall, but due to its lower elevation these closures are for brief periods. However, most east–west traffic in the region utilizes the four-lane State Route 58 through Tehachapi Pass, located about one hour's drive to the south.

The Pacific Crest Trail crosses at Walker Pass. A campsite situated about 0.6 miles (1 kilometer) southwest of the road pass is a popular stop for hikers and astronomers alike.

== California historical landmark ==
The California Historical Landmark reads:

NO. 99 WALKER'S PASS - Discovered by Joseph R. Walker, American trailblazer, who left the San Joaquin Valley through this pass in 1834. This area was traversed by topographer Edward M. Kern, after whom the Kern River was named, while accompanying the Frémont expedition of 1845. After 1860 it became a mining freight route to Owens Valley.

== See also ==
- List of Sierra Nevada road passes
- History of the Mojave Desert region
- History of the Sierra Nevada (United States)
- California Historical Landmarks in Kern County, California
- National Register of Historic Places listings in Kern County, California
