= Crown Fire =

2010 wildfire in Southern California

- Part of the 2010 California wildfires
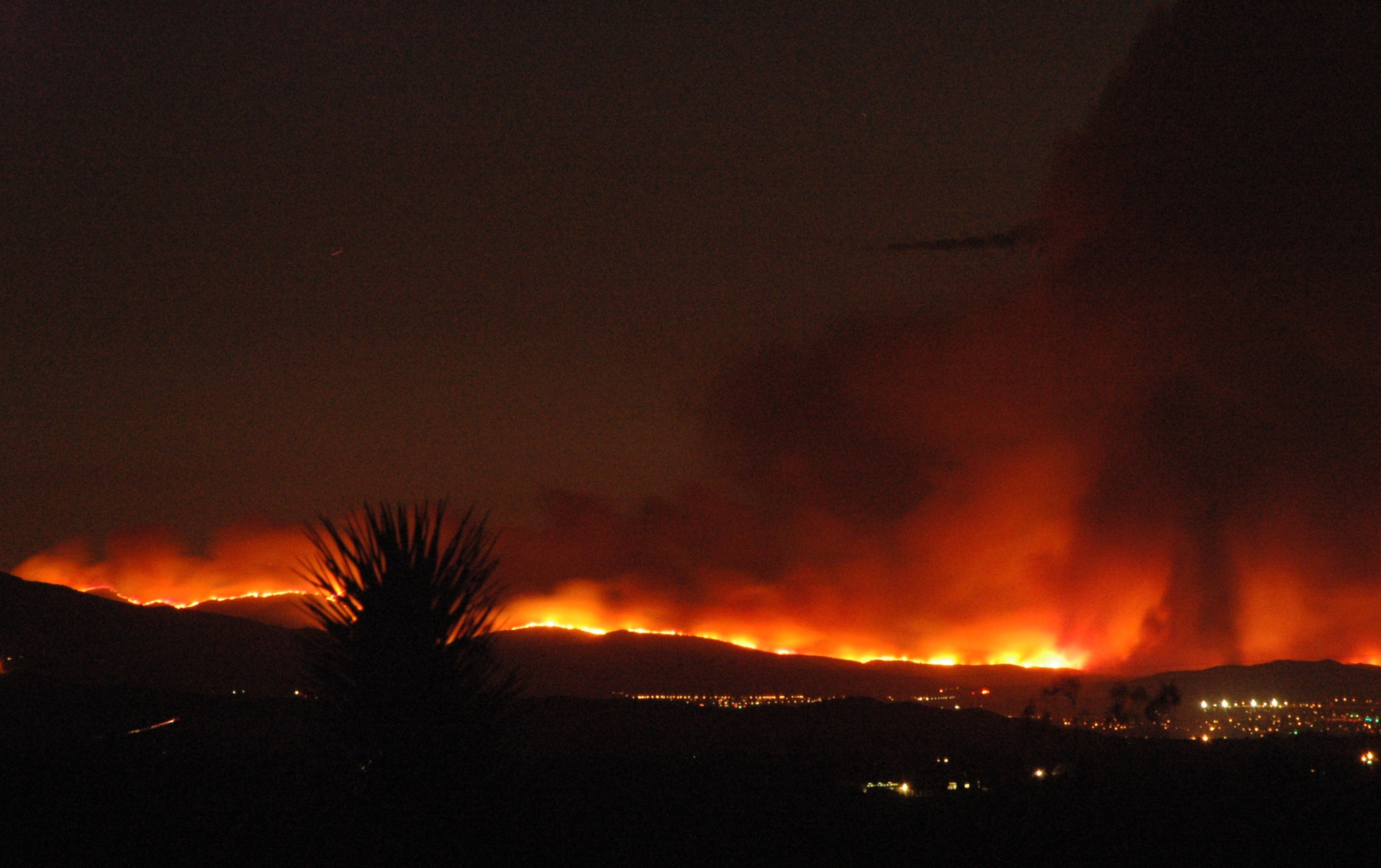
- The Crown Fire as seen from Llano on July 29.
- Date: July 29, 2010 –; August 3, 2010
- Location: Los Angeles, California

Statistics
- Burned area: 13,918 acres (56.32 km^{2})

Impacts
- Structures destroyed: 10

Ignition
- Cause: Workers using a hammer to extract bolts from tire rim.

The Crown Fire was a wildfire that scorched 13,918 acres (5,632 ha) of land in Los Angeles County, California. The second largest fire of the 2010 California wildfire season, the fire also destroyed 10 residences.

As the fire advanced on July 30, it jumped the California Aqueduct and progressed towards homes in Palmdale.
