= Mount Rose (Nevada) =

Mountain in the United States

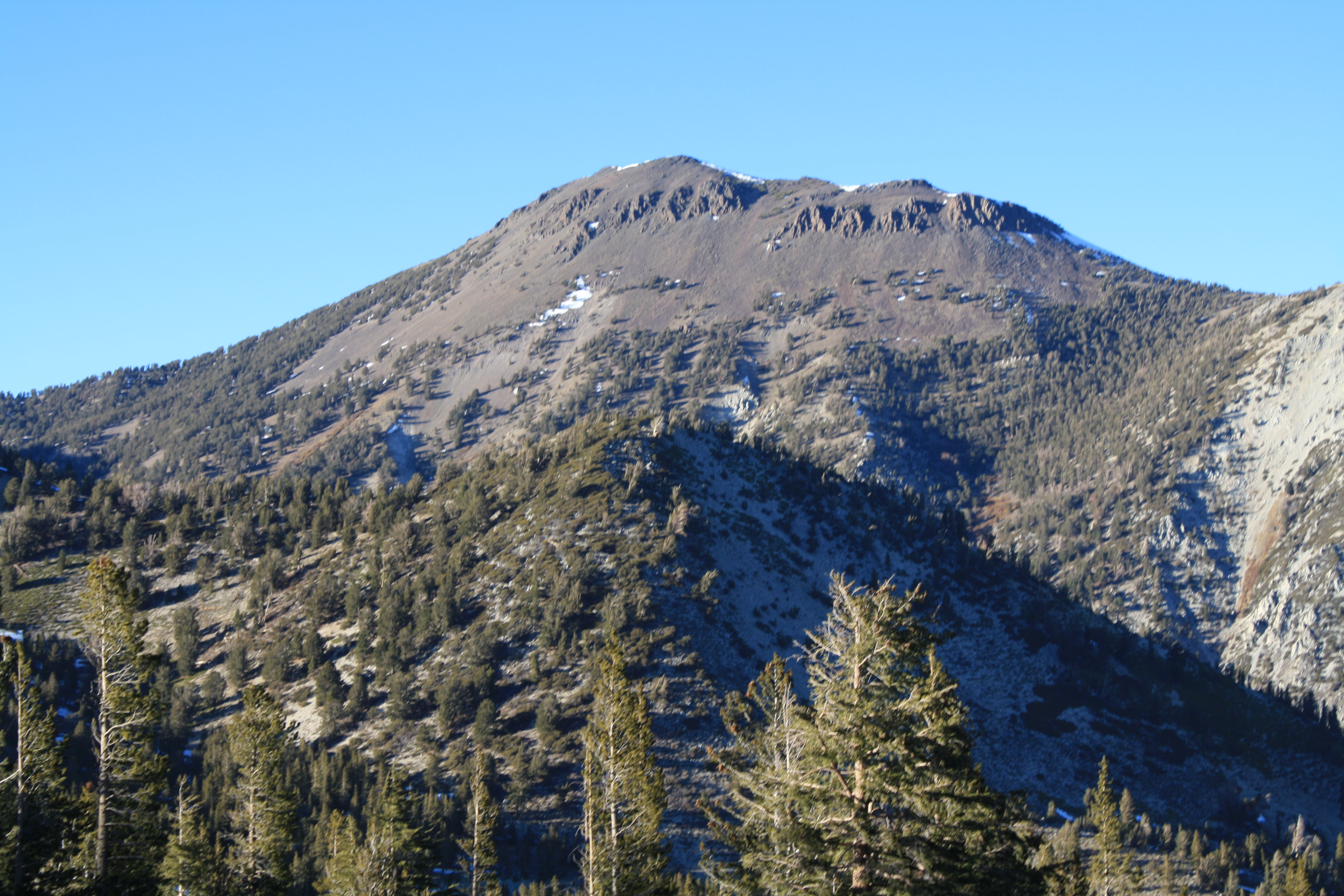
- Mt. Rose looking North from SR431, December 2008

Highest point
- Elevation: 10,785 ft (3,287 m) NAVD 88
- Prominence: 3,630 ft (1,106 m)
- Listing: Nevada County High Points 8th; GBPS Star Peak; Sierra Peaks Section
- Coordinates: 39°20′38″N 119°55′04″W

Geography
- Location within Nevada
- Location: Washoe County, Nevada, U.S.
- Parent range: Carson Range
- Topo map: USGS Mount Rose

Climbing
- Easiest route: Mount Rose Trail from Mount Rose Summit on Nevada State Route 431

Mount Rose is the highest mountain in Washoe County, within the Carson Range of Nevada, United States. It ranks thirty-seventh among the most topographically prominent peaks in the state. It is also both the highest and most topographically prominent peak of the greater Sierra Nevada range within the state of Nevada, and the third most topographically prominent peak in the Sierra Nevada overall. It is located in the Mount Rose Wilderness of the Humboldt-Toiyabe National Forest. An extinct volcano, the mountain is in between Lake Tahoe and Reno. State Route 431 traverses Mount Rose Summit southeast of Mount Rose. Due to the high elevation, most of the precipitation that falls on the mountain is snow. The view from Mount Rose facing east is the Truckee Meadows, the second largest population center in Nevada.

According to one tradition, the peak was named after Jacob S, Rose, an early settler, while another tradition states the mountain has the name of Rose Hickman, an early explorer.

Mount Rose Ski Tahoe is nearby, but is not on Mount Rose. Despite the name, the resort is actually on the slopes of Slide Mountain, which is on the other side of Nevada State Route 431. The east slope of Slide Mountain, is the East Bowl of Mt. Rose. In 1964, the north side of Slide Mountain was named Mount Rose Ski Area and Reno Ski Bowl was renamed Slide Mountain Ski Area. In 1987, the two ski areas merged and began operation as one resort named Mt. Rose.

Dr. James Edward Church of the University of Nevada established the Mount Rose Weather Observatory, one of America's first high-altitude meteorological observatories, on June 29, 1905.

== Summit panorama ==
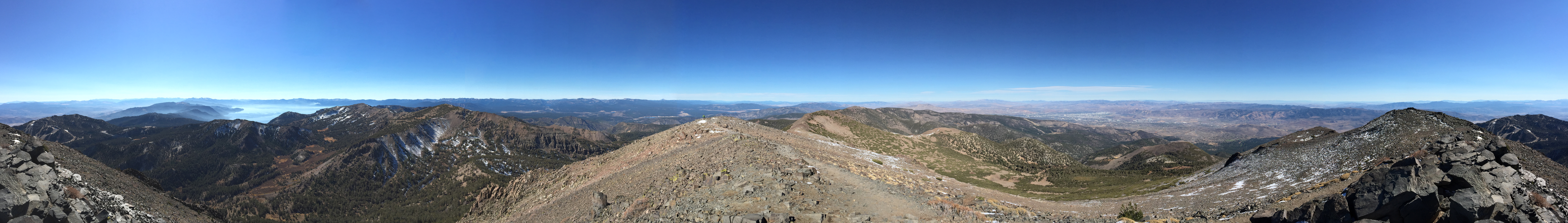
360-degree panorama from the summit of Mount Rose

== Climate ==
Being a three-thousander and a mountain at a considerably high latitude, Mount Rose has (köppen: dsc) subarctic climate with long snowy winters and short, dry tepid summers. On average, the summit experiences four months with tepid temperatures (that being its summer from June–September) while the remainder of the year remains cold and chilly with frequent subzero temperatures. In contrast to the rest of Nevada, Mount Rose is plentiful in precipitation, and thus stands out from the state's predominantly hot semi-arid/desert climate.

Climate data for Mount Rose 39.3444 N, 119.9150 W, Elevation: 10,292 ft (3,137 m) (1991–2020 normals)
Month	Jan	Feb	Mar	Apr	May	Jun	Jul	Aug	Sep	Oct	Nov	Dec	Year
Mean daily maximum °F (°C)	30.8 (−0.7)	29.9 (−1.2)	32.6 (0.3)	36.5 (2.5)	45.0 (7.2)	55.0 (12.8)	65.2 (18.4)	64.5 (18.1)	58.0 (14.4)	47.5 (8.6)	36.4 (2.4)	30.3 (−0.9)	44.3 (6.8)
Daily mean °F (°C)	23.0 (−5.0)	21.5 (−5.8)	23.6 (−4.7)	26.6 (−3.0)	34.8 (1.6)	44.0 (6.7)	53.8 (12.1)	53.0 (11.7)	46.7 (8.2)	37.2 (2.9)	28.2 (−2.1)	22.7 (−5.2)	34.6 (1.4)
Mean daily minimum °F (°C)	15.2 (−9.3)	13.2 (−10.4)	14.6 (−9.7)	16.7 (−8.5)	24.6 (−4.1)	33.0 (0.6)	42.3 (5.7)	41.5 (5.3)	35.3 (1.8)	26.9 (−2.8)	19.9 (−6.7)	15.0 (−9.4)	24.8 (−4.0)
Average precipitation inches (mm)	10.99 (279)	10.10 (257)	9.55 (243)	5.06 (129)	3.00 (76)	1.07 (27)	0.38 (9.7)	0.37 (9.4)	0.72 (18)	2.30 (58)	5.87 (149)	12.48 (317)	61.89 (1,572.1)
Source: PRISM Climate Group

Climate data for Mount Rose, Nevada (station elevation 7,500ft)
Month	Jan	Feb	Mar	Apr	May	Jun	Jul	Aug	Sep	Oct	Nov	Dec	Year
Record high °F (°C)	55 (13)	58 (14)	67 (19)	68 (20)	79 (26)	82 (28)	89 (32)	88 (31)	83 (28)	77 (25)	65 (18)	58 (14)	89 (32)
Mean daily maximum °F (°C)	37.0 (2.8)	36.9 (2.7)	36.9 (2.7)	42.0 (5.6)	55.6 (13.1)	66.8 (19.3)	75.0 (23.9)	75.5 (24.2)	67.0 (19.4)	54.2 (12.3)	43.0 (6.1)	39.5 (4.2)	52.5 (11.4)
Mean daily minimum °F (°C)	18.6 (−7.4)	17.8 (−7.9)	19.5 (−6.9)	23.2 (−4.9)	33.2 (0.7)	41.0 (5.0)	46.4 (8.0)	47.6 (8.7)	40.7 (4.8)	32.1 (0.1)	23.8 (−4.6)	21.7 (−5.7)	30.5 (−0.8)
Record low °F (°C)	−10 (−23)	−2 (−19)	−5 (−21)	4 (−16)	13 (−11)	20 (−7)	27 (−3)	31 (−1)	21 (−6)	14 (−10)	1 (−17)	−5 (−21)	−10 (−23)
Average precipitation inches (mm)	5.51 (140)	4.90 (124)	5.07 (129)	2.11 (54)	0.91 (23)	0.55 (14)	0.56 (14)	0.91 (23)	1.28 (33)	1.67 (42)	3.10 (79)	4.03 (102)	30.60 (777)
Average snowfall inches (cm)	16.8 (43)	37.1 (94)	43.0 (109)	4.7 (12)	0 (0)	0.4 (1.0)	0 (0)	0 (0)	0.1 (0.25)	2.3 (5.8)	2.3 (5.8)	9.9 (25)	116.6 (296)
Source: The Western Regional Climate Center

== See also ==
- List of highest points in Nevada by county
- Slide Mountain
