= Mount Rose (New Jersey) =

Coordinates: 40.360541°N 74.747543°W

Mount Rose is a narrow section of the Rocky Hill Ridge in Hopewell Township, New Jersey, which is 420 feet above sea level. The ridge's western end is at The Sourlands at Hopewell-Pennington Road and its eastern end is near Province Line Road. The ridge is a diabase intrusion and unlike many of the ridges in the state, it runs from northwest to southeast. Crusher Road travels along the ridge. Pennington-Rocky Hill Road, Cherry Valley Road, Hopewell-Princeton Road and Carter Road meet at a low point along the ridge at the village of Mount Rose.

== Hiking trails ==
- The Elks Trail- 1 mile trail off Crusher Road
- The Mount Rose Trails- This preserve has five trail options: The Ridge Trail, Forest Loop, East Loop, West Loop and Cattail Trail
