= Mount Rose Weather Observatory =

High altitude weather observatory on Mount Rose, Nevada, USA (est. 1905)

Coordinates: 39.3133°N 119.9022°W

The Mount Rose Weather Observatory was established on June 29, 1905, on the summit, making it one of the oldest high altitude weather observatories in the United States. Dr. James Edward Church established the observatory and established a snow survey system to measure the amount of water contained in the snow pack.

The observatory featured many design features that were unique or revolutionary for its time. This included the ability to record data without anyone at the site. The building was built to be able to shed accumulated snow from the roof without manual assistance.

The observatory was a department of the University of Nevada.

The site is marked as Nevada Historical Marker 230.
