= Rocky Hill Ridge =

Ridge in New Jersey

Coordinates: 40°21′50″N 74°43′25″W

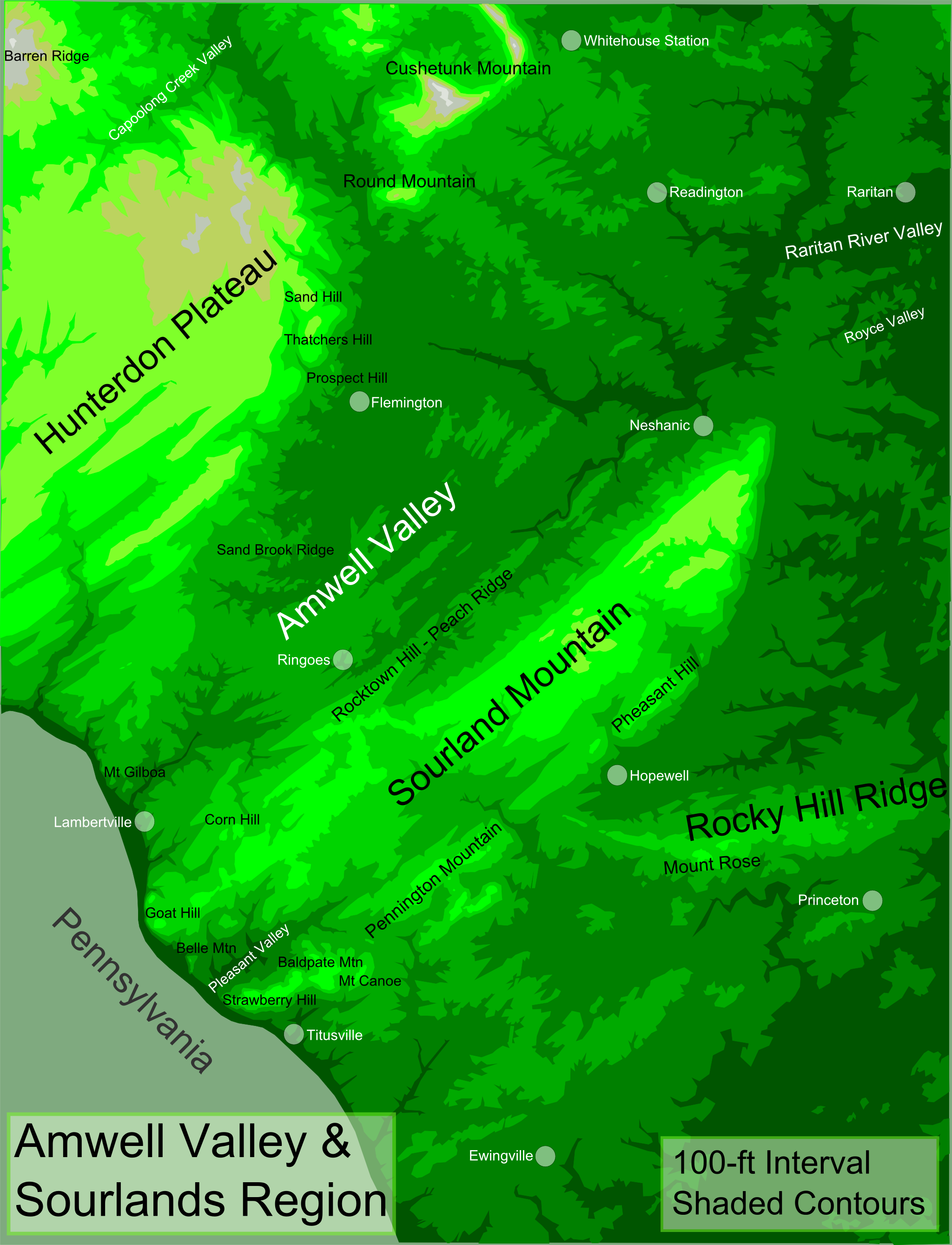
Topographic map depicting the greater Amwell Valley-Sourlands region with the western section of the Rocky Hill Ridge

Rocky Hill Ridge, also known as the Mount Lucas-Rocky Hill Ridge, named after Lucas Voorhees, an 18th-century landowner, is a diabase trap rock ridge running west to east in the US State of New Jersey. Diabase intrusions form Baldpate Mountain and Pennington Mountain, the Mount Rose extension of the Mount Lucas-Rocky Hill ridge, and part of the Sourland Mountains. The Ridge is nine miles (14 km) long and continues across the Millstone River, just below The Georgetown Franklin Turnpike, as the Ten-Mile Run Mountain and Lawrence Brook Mountain. The western section of the ridge, which runs to the northwest to The Sourlands (although not connecting with it because of the Hopewell Fault), is the Mount Rose section of the ridge.
