= Sherman Pass (California) =

Mountain pass in California, United States

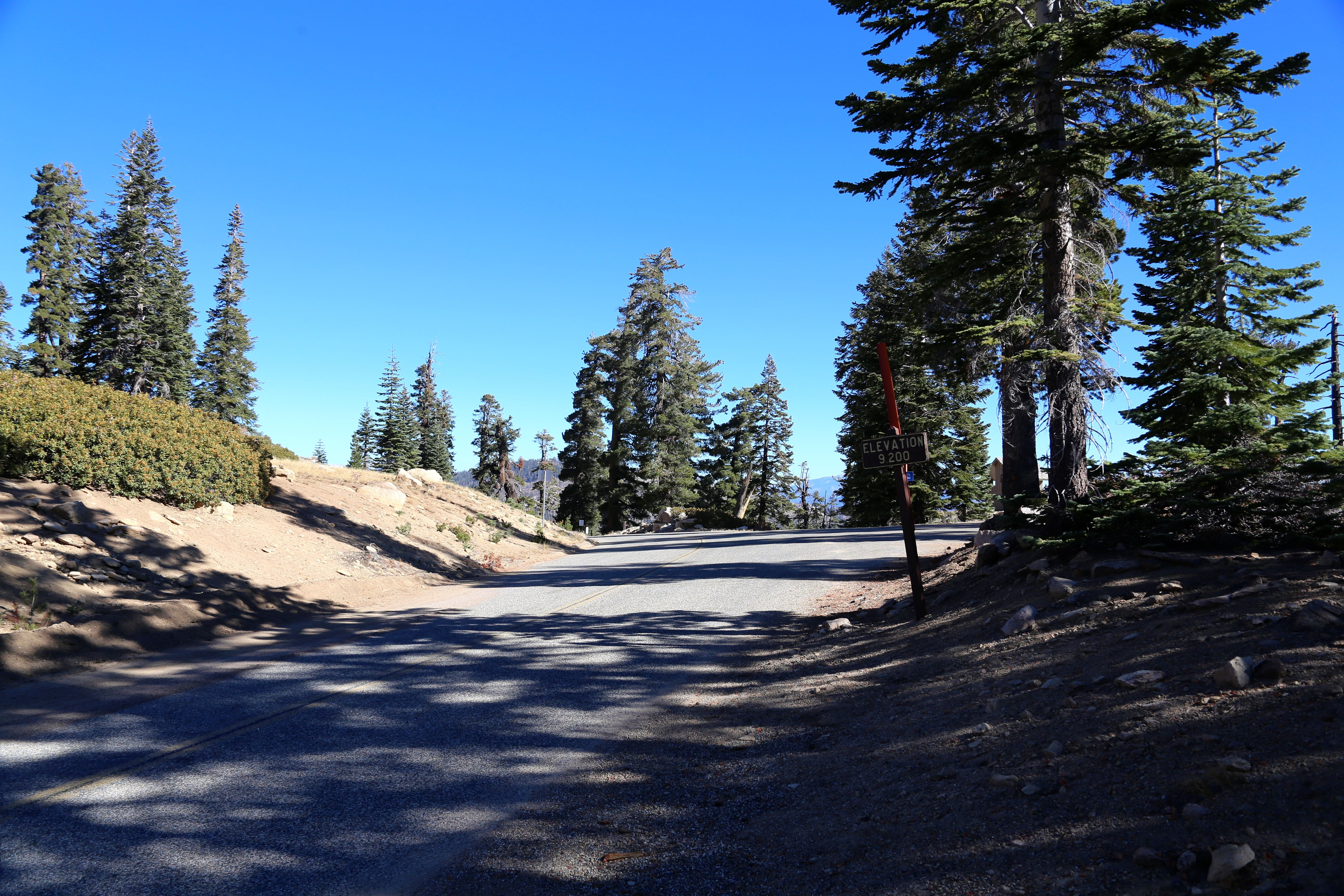

- Location within California
- Elevation: 9,200 feet (2,800 m)
- Traversed by: Sherman Pass Road (Forest Route 22S05)

Third Approach
- Location: Tulare County, California, U.S.
- Range: Sierra Nevada
- Coordinates: 35°59′26″N 118°21′57″W
- Topo map: USGS Sirretta Peak (7.5'); Kernville (15' and 30'); Isabella Lake (30x60'); Bakersfield (1x2°)

Sherman Pass (elevation 9,200 ft or 2,804 m) is a mountain pass in California on the Kern Plateau in the Sequoia National Forest near the southern tip of the Sierra Nevada. It is traversed by Sherman Pass Road (Forest Route 22S05), which runs from Kern River Highway (M-99) at the North Fork of the Kern River on the west to Kennedy Meadow Road (County Route J41) on the east.

Access from the east is via US 395 at 9-Mile Canyon Road north of Pearsonville, Kennedy Meadow Road to Kennedy Meadows, and Sherman Pass Road.

One access route from the west is via SR 99 at Sierra Avenue (County Route J22) in Earlimart to Ducor, Avenue 56 (County Route J22), Hot Springs Road (M-56) to California Hot Springs, Parker Pass Road (M-504 / Forest Route 23S03), Parker Pass Drive (M-50), Kern River Highway to Johnsondale, and Sherman Pass Road.

Another access route from the south is via SR 99 at SR 58 in Bakersfield, SR 184, SR 178 to Lake Isabella, SR 155, Burlando Road (County Road 495) to Kernville, Sierra Way (County Road 521) to Riverkern, Kern River Highway to Johnsondale, and Sherman Pass Road.

Like other road passes in the Sierra Nevada range, part of Sherman Pass Road is usually closed during the winter, with the exact opening and closure dates dependent on snowfall and available road clearing and repair resources.
