= Mount Rose Summit =

Mountain pass in Nevada, United States

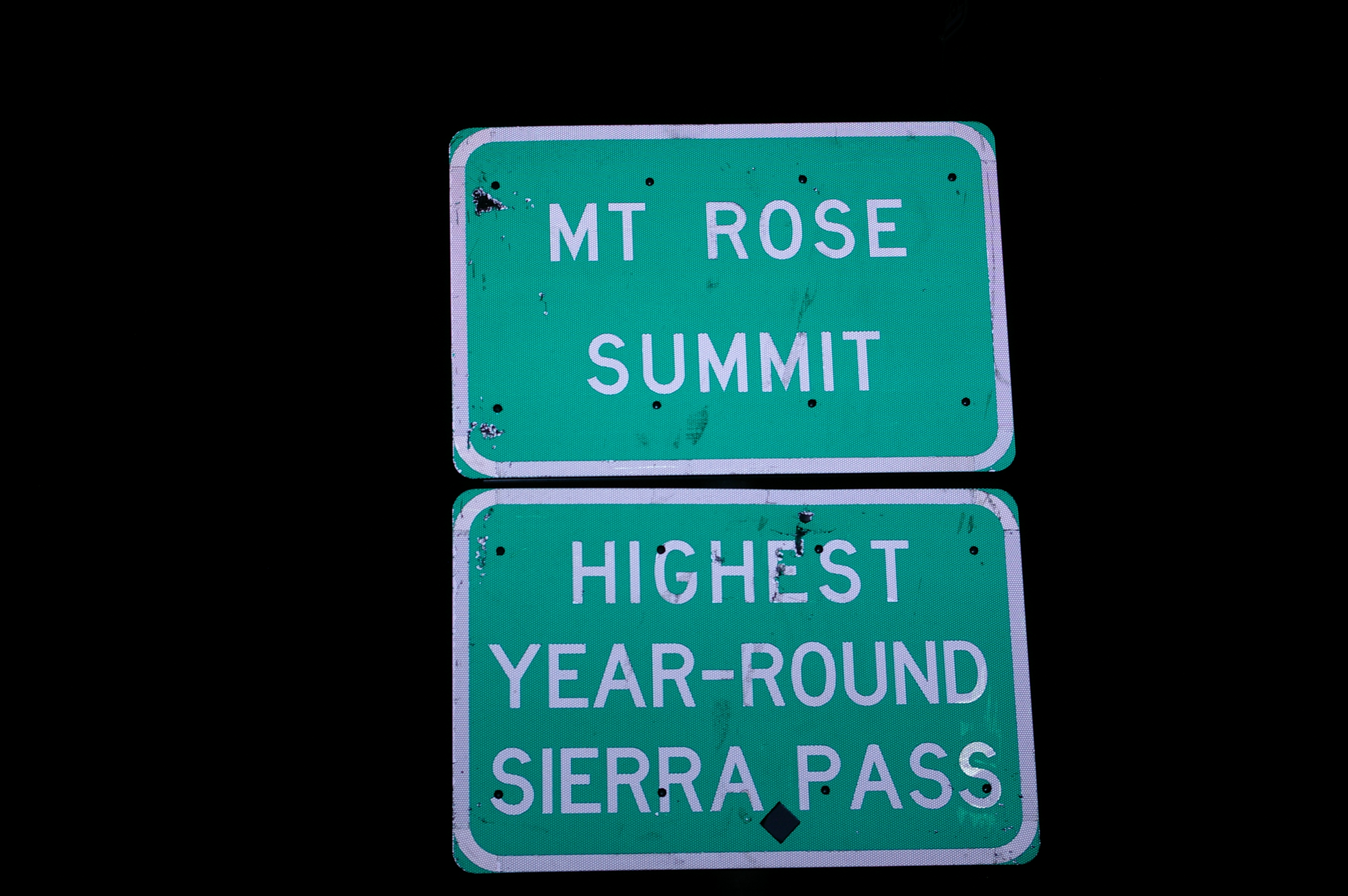
- Sign on the summit
- Interactive map of Mount Rose Summit
- Elevation: 8,911 feet (2,716 m)
- Traversed by: Nevada State Route 431

Third Approach
- Location: Washoe County, Nevada, United States
- Range: Carson Range / Sierra Nevada
- Coordinates: 39°18′48″N 119°53′50″W
- Topo map: USGS Mount Rose

Mount Rose Summit is a mountain pass located in the Carson Range near Mount Rose and Slide Mountain, northeast of Incline Village, Nevada, United States. The 8,911-foot-high (2,716 m) pass is traversed by State Route 431, which is the highest point of the highway and the highest mountain pass in the Sierra Nevada that remains open year-round. The saddle itself features a parking lot and a small building which both serve as a highway stop. A closed dirt road leading to the Mount Rose Ski Resort ends near the northern section of the summit. The pass is the low point of the saddle between Slide Mountain and Tamarack Peak.

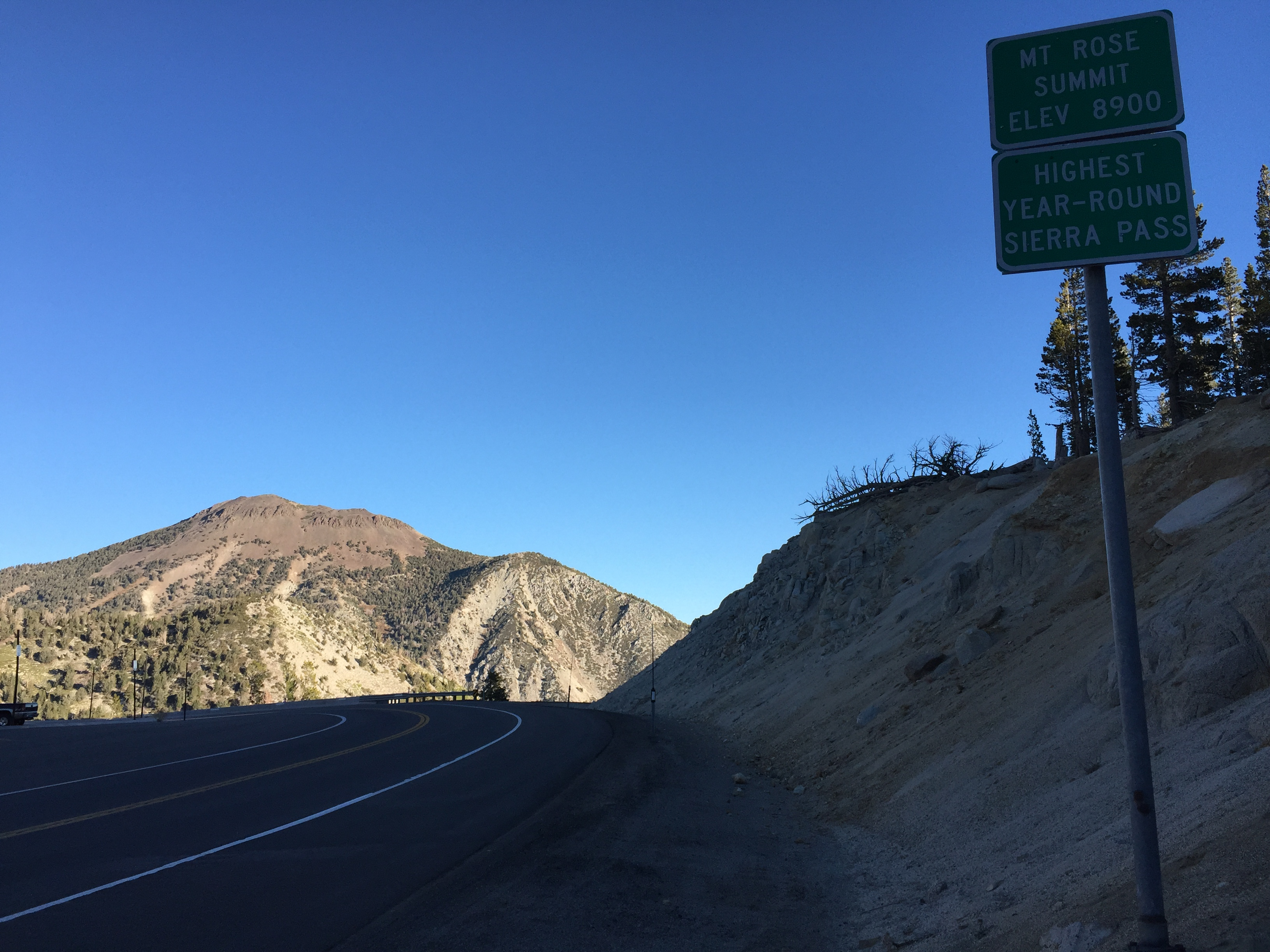
View east along SR 431 crossing Mount Rose Summit, with Mount Rose visible to the left

== See also ==
- List of Sierra Nevada road passes
