= Rose Mountain (Herkimer County, New York) =

Mountain in New York, United States

- Location within New York Location within the United States

Highest point
- Elevation: 2,326 feet (709 m)
- Coordinates: 43°36′54″N 74°55′26″W

Geography
- Location: Bisby Lodge, New York, U.S.
- Topo map: USGS Bisby Lakes

Rose Mountain is a mountain located in the Adirondack Mountains of New York northeast of Bisby Lodge.
