= James E. Church =

Pioneering snow hydrologist

James Edward Church, Jr. (15 February 1869 – 5 August 1959) is best known for having developed the Mount Rose snow sampler in 1906, the first instrument for measuring snow water content. It is still in use today. He was also active in promoting the then nascent sciences of snow hydrology and water supply forecasting.

Church, who received his Ph.D. from the Ludwig-Maximilians-Universität München, was born in Holly, Michigan on 15 February 1869. As a Classics professor he taught Latin, German, and fine arts at the University of Nevada, Reno from 1892 to 1939 and was the first person of European descent to ascend Mount Rose (1896). Church died in Reno, Nevada, on 5 August 1959. The Church Fine Arts Complex on the University of Nevada, Reno campus—which opened in 1962, three years after his death—is named after him.
