= Riverkern, California =

Unincorporated community in California, United States

Riverkern
- Unincorporated community
- Location in California Riverkern (the United States)
- Coordinates: 35°47′23″N 118°26′49″W
- Country: United States
- State: California
- County: Kern
- Elevation: 2,795 ft (852 m)

Riverkern is an unincorporated community in Kern County, California, United States. It lies at an elevation of 2,795 feet (852 m).
