= Kennedy Meadows (Tulare) =

- Unincorporated community
- Location in California Kennedy Meadows (Tulare) (the United States)
- Coordinates: 36°01′07.5″N 118°07′24.7″W
- Country: United States
- State: California
- County: Tulare
- Time zone: UTC-8 (Pacific (PST))
  - Summer (DST): UTC-7 (PDT)

Kennedy Meadows is a portion of the Kern Plateau in the southern section of the Sierra Nevada Mountain Range in Tulare County, California. It is a mixture of private and public land surrounded by wilderness and national forest. It is bounded by the South Sierra Wilderness to the north and west, by the Sacatar Trail Wilderness to the east and by the Domeland Wilderness to the south.

The area was a summer camp for Indians of the Owens Valley. There are traces of Indian encampments throughout the area indicated by the presence of Obsidian shards and arrowheads. Obsidian is not native to the area and had to be transported in. The area was homesteaded in the latter part of the 1800s with family ranches.

There are two well known businesses in the area. The Kennedy Meadows General Store is the world-famous destination of hikers on the Pacific Crest Trail which passes a few hundred yards from the store along the South Fork of the Kern River. The store holds large quantities of resupply boxes forwarded by the northbound thru-hikers. The other business is Grumpy Bears Retreat. The Kennedy Meadows Campground is 3 miles to the north. Twenty minutes to the west in the beginning of the “high country” are Fish Creek and Troy Meadows Campgrounds.

This area is not to be confused with the other Kennedy Meadows in the Sonora Pass region of central California.
