= Protected areas of the Sierra Nevada =

The protected areas of the Sierra Nevada, a major mountain range located in the U.S. states of California and Nevada, are numerous and highly diverse. Like the mountain range itself, these areas span hundreds of miles along the length of the range, and over 14,000 feet of elevation from the lowest foothills to the summit of Mount Whitney.

The Sierra Nevada, as a natural region, does not have exactly defined borders. In particular, to the north, there is a wide transition zone where the Cascade Range and the Sierra Nevada meet. As a result, it is difficult to delineate a border between these two mountain ranges. This list uses the common definition of the Sierra Nevada as the mountain range extending from Fredonyer Pass in the north to Tehachapi Pass in the south. It is also difficult to delineate between the Sierra Nevada mountains, the range's foothills, and the Central Valley; this article also considers any elevated and hilly terrain east of the flat Central Valley to be part of the range. Areas outside those bounds may also be included if they are widely associated with the Sierra Nevada.

== National parks and monuments ==
Name	Image	Location	Established (Note: This column indicates the date the relevant area was first protected under law, under any designation. Information about later changes to these designations can be found in the footnotes.)	Area	Elevation	Description
Kings Canyon National Park		33 miles east of Sanger. Includes parts of Fresno and Tulare counties. 36°47′N 118°40′W	October 1, 1890 (Note: Established as General Grant National Park on that date. Expanded and re-designated under its current name on March 4, 1940.)	461,902.2 acres (721.7 sq mi; 1,869.3 km^{2})	1,370–14,505 ft (418–4,421 m) (Note: Combined elevation range of Kings Canyon National Park and Sequoia National Park. The two parks are managed together as one unit.)	The park encompasses North Palisade mountain; the Palisade Glacier, the largest glacier in the Sierra Nevada; the North and Middle Forks of the Kings River; the Roaring River, a fast-flowing tributary; and the Grant Grove of giant sequoias including the General Grant, the second largest sequoia in the world. Kings Canyon has the greatest riverbed-to-summit height differential of any canyon in North America.
Sequoia National Park		Tulare County, 27 miles east of Visalia. (Note: As measured from downtown Visalia to the Ash Mountain entrance.) 36°33′N 118°46′W	September 25, 1890	404,062.2 acres (631.3 sq mi; 1,635.2 km^{2})	1,370–14,505 ft (418–4,421 m)	The Giant Forest, inhabited by the giant sequoias that give the park its name, is home to five of the ten largest trees on Earth, including General Sherman, the world's largest tree. The Giant Forest is only one of dozens of sequoia groves in the park, including Muir Grove and Garfield Grove. Crystal Cave, a marble karst cave, is one of more than 240 known caves in the area. In the backcountry, the Great Dividing Range and Kern Canyon are among many remote alpine peaks and valleys. The park spans 13,000 feet (4,000 m) of vertical relief, from the deep canyons of the lower foothills to Mount Whitney, whose summit is the highest point in the contiguous United States.
Yosemite National Park		18 miles northeast of Mariposa. (Note: As measured from downtown Mariposa to the Arch Rock entrance.) Includes parts of Madera, Mariposa, Mono, and Tuolumne counties. 37°51′N 119°33′W	June 30, 1864 (Note: Established on that date as Yosemite State Park. Yosemite National Park was founded on October 1, 1890, incorporating land not part of the state park. The state park and national park existed in parallel until 1906, when the state park was integrated into the national park.)	761,747.5 acres (1,190.2 sq mi; 3,082.7 km^{2})	2,127–13,114 ft (648–3,997 m)	Yosemite Valley, the centerpiece of the park, is a densely forested 3,500 ft (1,100 m) deep glacial valley flanked for its whole length by soaring granite masses such as Half Dome and El Capitan. The valley is also known for its many waterfalls, including Bridalveil Fall and Yosemite Falls, the highest waterfall in North America. (Note: Yosemite Falls is not the highest waterfall in the United States – Puʻukaʻoku Falls in Hawaii is taller. However, despite being a U.S. state, Hawaii is geographically located in Oceania, not North America.) Tuolumne Meadows, a broad subalpine meadow astride the Tuolumne River studded with numerous granite domes and outcroppings, is the centerpiece of the Yosemite high country, which also includes Glen Aulin valley and a number of high alpine peaks such as Mount Dana and Mount Lyell. Near Wawona to the south, the Mariposa Grove is home to hundreds of giant sequoias, including the Grizzly Giant. Tioga Pass, the highest highway pass in the Sierra Nevada, is a popular scenic route as well as an important link between the Eastern Sierra and the major population centers to the west.
Devils Postpile National Monument		Madera County, 7 miles west of Mammoth Lakes. (Note: As measured from the intersection of Main St and Old Mammoth Rd in Mammoth Lakes to the Devils Postpile ranger station.) 37°37′N 119°5′W	July 6, 1911 (Note: Originally managed by the U.S. Forest Service. Transferred to the National Park Service on August 10, 1933.)	800.2 acres (1.3 sq mi; 3.2 km^{2})	7,200–8,202 ft (2,190–2,500 m)	Devil's Postpile, a large and striking formation of columnar basalt formed by an ancient lava flow, is the focal point of this national monument. The formation sits alongside the Middle Fork of the San Joaquin River as it courses through the monument. Further downstream, Rainbow Falls is another notable attraction. Devil's Postpile is located near Minaret Summit, the lowest gap along the Sierra Crest for an over 150 miles (240 km) stretch of contiguous roadless wilderness. As such, the area is also an important resupply point for the John Muir Trail and Pacific Crest Trail, which merge into one trail for a short distance as they pass through the monument.
Giant Sequoia National Monument (Note: Unlike the other National Park System areas in the Sierra Nevada, the Giant Sequoia National Monument is administered by the U.S. Forest Service, not the National Park Service.)		Two discontiguous units covering parts of Fresno and Tulare counties. 36°2′N 118°30′W	April 15, 2000	327,769 acres (512.1 sq mi; 1,326.4 km^{2})	1,080–10,365 ft (330–3,160 m)	The monument includes 38 of the 39 giant sequoia groves in the Sequoia National Forest, amounting to about half of the sequoia groves currently in existence. This includes one of the ten largest giant sequoias, the Boole Tree. Its two parts are around Kings Canyon and Sequoia National Parks.

== National forests ==
Name	Image	Location	Established (Note: This column indicates the date the relevant area was first protected under law, under any designation. Information about later changes to these designations can be found in the footnotes.)	Area	Elevation	Description
Eldorado National Forest		El Dorado, Amador, Alpine, and Placer counties, California; Douglas County, Nevada 38°45′N 120°20′W	1910	615,037 acres (961.0 sq mi; 2,489.0 km^{2})	1,000–10,381 ft (305–3,164 m)	At the lower and middle elevations, steep and deep river canyons cut through densely forested, gently rolling plateaus that are home to numerous lakes and reservoirs. Closer to the Sierra crest, the terrain is much more rugged, with peaks soaring above treeline. The forest is home to two wilderness areas. Round Top, its highest peak, is at the center of a popular backcountry skiing area near Carson Pass.
Humboldt–Toiyabe National Forest		Mono, Alpine, Sierra, Nevada, Lassen, and El Dorado counties, California; Mineral, Lyon, Washoe, and Douglas counties and Carson City, Nevada 38°15′N 119°14′W	1995	1,600,000 acres (2,500.0 sq mi; 6,475.0 km^{2}) (Note: Bridgeport and Carson ranger districts only)	4,500–12,374 ft (1,372–3,772 m) (Note: Bridgeport and Carson ranger districts only)	Two districts of this highly dispersed national forest protect a long stretch of the steep, rugged eastern slope of the Sierra Nevada. The terrain ranges from the stark granite peaks and basins along the crest, to lush green valleys and forested mountains further down the eastern slope, to scrubby arid ranges located to the east of the Sierras. The forest also protects Nevada's Carson Range, a spur of the Sierra Nevada along the east shore of Lake Tahoe.
Inyo National Forest		Inyo, Mono, Tulare, Fresno, and Madera counties, California; Esmeralda and Mineral counties, Nevada 37°50′N 119°00′W	1907	1,987,820 acres (3,106.0 sq mi; 8,044.4 km^{2})	4,000–14,505 ft (1,219–4,421 m)	Inyo National Forest protects the eastern slope of the southern Sierra. The southern part of the forest, along the western edge of Owens Valley, is characterized by a precipitous drop from the Sierra crest, reaching up to 14,505 feet (4,421 m) at its highest point at Mount Whitney, down to the valley floor at 4,000 feet (1,200 m) to 5,000 feet (1,500 m), in the span of just a few miles. This national forest is also home to much of the volcanic Long Valley Caldera and other scenic landscape along U.S. Highway 395.
Lake Tahoe Basin Management Unit		El Dorado, Placer, and Alpine counties, California; Douglas and Washoe counties and Carson City, Nevada 39°00′N 120°00′W	1973	154,519 acres (241.4 sq mi; 625.3 km^{2})	6,225–10,881 ft (1,897–3,317 m)	A special unit of the USFS, covering the entirety of the Lake Tahoe basin. This unit is unique among national forests of the area in that it contains heavily populated lakeside communities of tens of thousands of people. The basin includes a wide variety of environments, including the famous shoreline of Lake Tahoe, glacial lakes such as Fallen Leaf Lake, prominent peaks such as Freel Peak and Mount Tallac, and high-alpine meadows that form the upper headwaters of the Truckee River.
Lassen National Forest		Lassen, Shasta, Tehama, Plumas, and Butte counties, California 40°30′N 121°00′W	1905	1,154,418 acres (1,803.8 sq mi; 4,671.8 km^{2})	3,200–8,683 ft (975–2,647 m)	The Lassen National Forest protects a unique area at the crossroads of three major ecological regions: the Sierra Nevada, the Cascade Range, and the Great Basin. The forest contains soaring volcanic peaks such as Lassen Peak and Brokeoff Mountain, wide plateaus of transitional forest and sagebrush, and the homelands of Ishi, the last Native American to live most of his life free interactions with the dominant Anglo-Americans.
Plumas National Forest		Plumas, Butte, Sierra, Lassen, and Yuba counties, California 40°00′N 120°40′W	1907	1,205,769 acres (1,884.0 sq mi; 4,879.6 km^{2})	2,000–8,372 ft (610–2,552 m)	Spanning over a million acres in the northern reaches of the Sierra Nevada, this national forest protects the section of the mountain range with the densest forests and the most prodigious precipitation. While lacking the sheer vertical relief of other parts of the Sierra, the forest contains remote unspoiled backcountry lakes, sheer river canyons cutting through rugged plateaus, and wide meadows tucked into the folds of the mountain range. Notable features include the Feather River Canyon and Bucks Lake Wilderness.
Sequoia National Forest		Tulare, Kern, and Fresno counties, California 36°02′N 118°30′W	1908	1,114,908 acres (1,742.0 sq mi; 4,511.9 km^{2})	1,000–12,432 ft (305–3,789 m)	Named for the giant tree of the same name, this forest protects the largest concentration of giant sequoias on the planet. Additionally, it protects diverse environments over a massive elevation range, from the steep semi-arid canyons and foothills at the base to the soaring granite peaks, high above treeline, in its eastern reaches. The park contains a national monument and surrounds two large national parks.
Sierra National Forest		Fresno, Madera, and Mariposa counties, California 37°25′N 119°10′W	1893	1,316,195 acres (2,056.6 sq mi; 5,326.5 km^{2})	900–13,986 ft (274–4,263 m)	Occupying the area between Yosemite and Kings Canyon, the Sierra National Forest contains numerous lakes, high peaks, and occasional groves of giant sequoias. It has some of the biggest high-elevation lakes and reservoirs in the entire mountain range, including Florence Lake, Edison Lake, Huntington Lake, Shaver Lake, Courtright Reservoir, Wishon Reservoir, and others.
Stanislaus National Forest		Tuolumne, Alpine, Mariposa, and Calaveras counties, California 38°15′N 120°00′W	1897	898,741 acres (1,404.3 sq mi; 3,637.1 km^{2})	1,500–11,569 ft (457–3,526 m)	Stanislaus National Forest protects the rugged, deeply dissected granite terrain north of Yosemite, and the rivers and canyons to its west. The Grand Canyon of the Tuolumne, still visibly impacted by the Rim Fire of 2013, presents sweeping vistas of its sheer cliffs and the river far below. The Emigrant Wilderness protects a high-elevation landscape of broken granite hills and peaks studded by green oases, small lakes, and scattered meadows.
Tahoe National Forest		Sierra, Placer, Nevada, Yuba, Plumas, and El Dorado counties, California 39°34′N 120°34′W	1905	854,814 acres (1,335.6 sq mi; 3,459.3 km^{2})	1,500–9,148 ft (457–2,788 m)	Protecting the land north and west of the lake of the same name, Tahoe National Forest protects environments ranging from ponderosa-oak mixed forests in the foothill elevations to rocky buttes and granite peaks along the crest. Water is everywhere in this forest, with half a dozen parallel rivers running down the western slope to the Sacramento Valley. The Granite Chief Wilderness protects the area to the south and east of Donner Pass, not far from the travails of the infamous pioneers who gave the pass its name. Independence Lake, a pristine glacial lake in a remote corner of the forest, is one of the last refuges of a native species of trout, and has survived numerous attempts at development.

== Wilderness areas ==
Name	Image	Location	Established (Note: This column indicates the date the relevant area was first protected under law, under any designation. Information about later changes to these designations can be found in the footnotes.)	Area	Elevation	Description
Ansel Adams Wilderness		Madera, Fresno, and Mono counties 37°41′N 119°11′W	1964	231,533 acres (362 sq mi; 937 km^{2})	3,500–13,143 ft (1,067–4,006 m)	Covering the area to the south and east of Yosemite National Park and spanning areas on both sides of the Sierra Crest, this wilderness area contains extensive high-alpine terrain above tree line, subalpine forest below tree line, and numerous lakes. Notable features include Thousand Island Lake and Banner Peak (pictured, left).
Bright Star Wilderness		Kern County 35.5063454°N 118.2428549°W	October 31, 1994	8,190 acres (12.8 sq mi; 33.1 km^{2})	3,000–6,080 ft (900–1,900 m)	Bright Star Wilderness comprises high desert in the far southern reaches of the Sierra Nevada. The area encompasses Kelso Peak and the Kelso Creek watershed. The Wilderness spans more than 3,000 feet (910 m) of elevation differential, and its ecosystems range from desert scrubland to pinyon-juniper woodland.
Bucks Lake Wilderness		Plumas County 39°57′15″N 121°10′34″W	1984	23,958 acres (37.4 sq mi; 97.0 km^{2})	2,000–7,120 ft (610–2,170 m)	Located in the Feather River basin, the Bucks Lake Wilderness covers the northernmost distinct portion of the Sierra Crest. Located to the north and west of its eponymous canyon, it covers a highland area densely forested with coniferous trees, especially red fir. Spanish Peak, at just over 7,000 feet, provides a sweeping view of the surrounding area and extending as far away as Lassen Peak. A number of bogs and meadows can be found in this exceptionally wet part of the Sierra Nevada.
Carson–Iceberg Wilderness		Alpine and Tuolumne counties 38°27′02″N 119°44′57″W	1984	161,000 acres (252 sq mi; 650 km^{2})	4,800–11,459 ft (1,500–3,493 m)	The Dardanelles, a series of volcanic peaks, rise above 11,000 feet, an anomaly in an otherwise granitic area of the mountain range. The western slope features numerous creeks and rivers cutting canyons down to the Central Valley. The east side, much drier than the west side, features numerous lakes in glacier-carved landscapes. The Iceberg, a distinctive granite formation sculpted by glacial action, gave the wilderness its name alongside explorer Kit Carson.
Chimney Peak Wilderness		Tulare County 35°50′56″N 118°05′09″W	1994	13,140 acres (20.53 sq mi; 53.2 km^{2})	5,200–7,994 ft (1,600–2,437 m)	The Chimney Peak Wilderness protects an area of transitional high desert in the foothills of the southeastern part of the range. Vegetated with sagebrush at lower elevations and pinyon-juniper woodland at higher elevations, the wilderness area is known for its displays of wildflowers in wet years. A number of streams and springs counterbalance the otherwise dry and rocky nature of the landscape.
Desolation Wilderness		El Dorado County 38°55′11″N 120°10′12″W	January 1, 1969	63,960 acres (99.94 sq mi; 258.8 km^{2})	6,500–9,983 ft (2,000–3,043 m)	Located west of Lake Tahoe, the Desolation Wilderness is said to be the most visited wilderness area in the United States on a per-square-mile basis. Mount Tallac soars 3,500 feet over Lake Tahoe, providing commanding views of the lake and its basin. Aloha Lake is a unique environment, with the jumbled terrain of the area producing a highly irregular lake with countless small islands. With more than 130 lakes in only 100 square miles, water is everywhere in this wilderness – additionally, on the highest peaks, snowpack can persist well into the summer. Between the numerous lake basins are dozens of barren granite peaks that characterize the desolation for which the wilderness is named.
Dinkey Lakes Wilderness		Fresno County 37.1713511427°N 119.036237702°W	September 28, 1984	30,863 acres (48.223 sq mi; 124.90 km^{2})	8,000–10,612 ft (2,400–3,235 m)	Northwest of Courtright Reservoir, this densely forested area is home to over a dozen significant lakes. Steep yet rounded granite monoliths, including the Three Sisters peak at over 10,000 feet, rise from rugged plateaus dotted with lakes, meadows, and rocky outcroppings.
Domeland Wilderness		Tulare and Kern counties 35°53′00″N 118°12′33″W	1964	94,695 acres (147.961 sq mi; 383.22 km^{2})	3,000–9,724 ft (910–2,964 m)	The southern end of the Kern Plateau is home to numerous granite domes, including the notable Church Dome, that host scenic views of the surrounding semi-arid, lightly wooded landscape. Vegetation is characterized by pinyon-juniper pine on the highlands of the plateau, grading to sagebrush scrub in the desert below.
Emigrant Wilderness		Tuolumne County 38°11′07″N 119°45′53″W	1975	112,277 acres (175.433 sq mi; 454.37 km^{2})	5,000–11,569 ft (1,500–3,526 m)	Emigrant Wilderness is northwest of Yosemite. Its lower western region is rocky and mostly barren, but small lakes and meadows have developed in scattered basins and hollows. Its northeast region is volcanic with peaks forming part of the Sierra crest. Meadows with stands of trees and granite outcrops have been compared to Yosemite "in miniature".
Golden Trout Wilderness		Tulare and Inyo counties 36°18′0″N 118°19′19″W	1978	303,511 acres (474.236 sq mi; 1,228.27 km^{2})	4,800–12,900 ft (1,500–3,900 m)	Golden Trout Wilderness marks the southernmost extent of ice in the Sierra Nevada during the Last Glacial Period. It spans the Kern River, and its larger eastern portion includes the Kern Plateau, which is drained by the South Fork Kern River.
Granite Chief Wilderness		Placer County 39°08′58″N 120°17′45″W	1984	25,680 acres (40.13 sq mi; 103.9 km^{2})	5,000–9,006 ft (1,500–2,745 m)	The headwaters of the American River rise in the highlands to the west of Granite Chief, a highly prominent peak that also overlooks the Palisades Tahoe ski area to the east. The Five Lakes Basin, accessible by day hike from a trailhead near Alpine Meadows, is a popular area that is also traversed by the Pacific Crest trail. The forest is dominated by lodgepole and red fir at upper elevations, and a more varied mixture of conifers and deciduous trees at the lower elevations around 5,000 feet. French Meadows, in the northwest of the wilderness area, is further protected as a game refuge.
Hoover Wilderness		Mono County 38°6′47″N 119°22′37″W	1931	128,000 acres (200 sq mi; 520 km^{2})	7,000–12,590 ft (2,100–3,840 m)	Northeast of Yosemite National Park, the Sierra Nevada descends steeply to its eastern base along the western edge of the Great Basin. The sparsely forested terrain, featuring scattered stands of hemlock, pine, aspen, and cottonwood, affords wide open views across the mountains and meadows.
Ishi Wilderness		Tehama County 40°08′05″N 121°45′19″W	1984	41,339 acres (64.592 sq mi; 167.29 km^{2})	1,000–4,320 ft (300–1,320 m)	Named for the last California Native American to make contact with white society, this wilderness area protects the historic homeland of the Yahi Yana people. In contrast to other Sierra wilderness areas, most of which protect either the alpine and subalpine country along the crest or the high desert to the east, this wilderness area is unique in that it protects the lower-elevation foothills of the western slope. The landscape, which receives plentiful winter and spring rainfall, consists mainly of parallel creeks in densely wooded valleys divided by east–west ridges. Numerous volcanic features dot the area including caves and lava plugs. The Ishi Wilderness is the winter home of California's most numerous migratory deer herd.
Jennie Lakes Wilderness		Tulare County 36°41′00″N 118°40′00″W	1984	10,556 acres (16.494 sq mi; 42.72 km^{2})	7,000–10,365 ft (2,100–3,159 m)	This small wilderness area is home to two main lakes, Jennie Lake (for which it is named) and Weaver Lake. Mitchell Peak, at over 10,000 feet, overlooks the lakes and offers wide-ranging views of the area. In addition to the two main lakes, there are half a dozen smaller lakes at elevations ranging up to over 9,000 feet. The area is home to upper montane forest typical of the upper middle elevations of the Sierra Nevada.
John Krebs Wilderness		Tulare County 36.4608599°N 118.5817346°W	March 30, 2009	39,740 acres (62.09 sq mi; 160.8 km^{2})	3,400–12,432 ft (1,000–3,789 m)	Mineral King, a subalpine glacial valley, forms the headwaters of the East Fork Kaweah River. The mountain summits flanking the valley reach over 11,000 feet, more than two-thirds of a mile above the valley floor. High cliffs line the faces of the high peaks, giving way to rocky slopes immediately below and eventually to forested, gently sloping hillsides. At the bottom of the valley is a lush meadow and wetland habitat fringing the river. The valley has narrowly escaped large-scale development a number of times, most notably a Disney proposal for a ski area and year-round family resort. The creation of the wilderness area protected Mineral King from such developments indefinitely into the future.
John Muir Wilderness		Fresno, Inyo, Mono, and Madera counties 36°58′33″N 118°48′42″W	January 1, 1964	650,000 acres (1,020 sq mi; 2,600 km^{2})	4,000–14,505 ft (1,200–4,421 m)	The John Muir Wilderness stretches along the Sierra crest for 90 miles. Mount Whitney, at 14,505 feet, is the tallest summit in not only the Sierra Nevada but also the entire contiguous United States. Mount Williamson, the second highest peak in the Sierra Nevada, rises straight from the Owens Valley floor more than two miles below. The Palisade Glacier is the southernmost glacier in the U.S., and its namesake peak, North Palisade, is a famous rock climbing destination. The John Muir Trail and Pacific Crest Trail run for a great distance through this wilderness area. In addition to the long and narrow section along the crest, this wilderness area also covers some lower-elevation terrain in the western Sierra north of Kings Canyon National Park.
Kaiser Wilderness		Fresno County 37°25′00″N 119°10′00″W	1976	21,986 acres (34.353 sq mi; 88.97 km^{2})	7,200–10,310 ft (2,200–3,140 m)	North of Huntington Lake, Kaiser Peak crowns a high massif separated from the main body of the High Sierra by the canyon of the South Fork San Joaquin River. From the lake's north shore, the ridge rises gently amidst dense stands of coniferous forest, culminating at the subalpine zone near the summit. On the north side of Kaiser Peak, the terrain plunges steeply into the deep canyon far below.
Kiavah Wilderness		Kern County 35°37′20″N 118°06′46″W	1994	88,290 acres (137.95 sq mi; 357.3 km^{2})	5,000–7,294 ft (1,500–2,223 m)	The Scodie Mountains, a low mountain range located at the far southeasternmost extent of the Sierra Nevada, are protected by this wilderness area. These mountains are quite arid, generally receiving only 10 to 15 inches of rainfall-equivalent precipitation per year. As a result, this area contains features of both the Sierra Nevada and Mojave Desert ecosystems, forming a sort of transition zone at the edge of the desert. The driest locations are home to desert vegetation such as sagebrush, creosote, and Joshua trees, and the bajadas at the foot of the mountains are home to desert animals including numerous lizards and the yellow-eared pocket mouse. In areas that receive somewhat greater rainfall, vegetation common to the drier parts of the Sierra, such as pinyon, juniper, canyon oak, and grey pine predominate.
Mokelumne Wilderness		Alpine, Amador, and Calaveras counties 38°35′00″N 119°58′43″W	1964	105,165 acres (164.320 sq mi; 425.59 km^{2})	4,000–10,381 ft (1,200–3,164 m)	Round Top, a geologic remnant of a former volcano, is the highest point in the wilderness, rising to the south of Carson Pass and overlooking several major V-shaped canyons to the south that cut through the heart of the wilderness. Most notable among those canyons is that of the Mokelumne River. Along the banks of that river deep in its canyon, the outlaw Monte Wolfe lived off the land in isolation for years after numerous run-ins with the law. Mokelumne Peak, an isolated peak deep in the wilderness, rises nearly a mile from the canyons below and features commanding views that reach from Round Top all the way to Mount Diablo.
Monarch Wilderness		Fresno County 36°52′35″N 118°45′10″W	1984	44,216 acres (69.088 sq mi; 178.94 km^{2})	2,000–11,080 ft (610–3,380 m)	Encompassing over 9,000 feet of vertical relief, the Monarch Wilderness extends from steep chaparral canyonlands at its lowest to rugged subalpine peaks at its highest. Split in half by a road in Kings Canyon national park, the wilderness spans both walls of the deep Kings River canyon. The high country is home to a number of groves of giant sequoias.
Mount Rose Wilderness		Washoe County, Nevada 39°21′00″N 119°55′00″W	1989	31,183 acres (48.723 sq mi; 126.19 km^{2})	5,000–10,776 ft (1,500–3,285 m)	Mount Rose, the highest peak in the Carson Range, sits at the center of the high country of this range, a spur of the Sierra Nevada which projects into Nevada and wraps around Lake Tahoe across the lake from the main body of the Sierra. The peak offers views of the Reno-Sparks-Carson City metropolitan area in the Truckee Meadows to the east. This wilderness area receives heavy use due to its proximity to a number of cities, but in addition to the popular trails it protects areas deeper in the backcountry which see far fewer visitors.
Owens Peak Wilderness		Kern and Tulare counties 35°43′01″N 117°58′04″W	1994	74,060 acres (115.72 sq mi; 299.7 km^{2})	3,120–8,453 ft (950–2,576 m)	At nearly 8,500 feet, Owens Peak is the highest point in a cluster of subsidiary ranges at the interface between the Mojave Desert and the bulk of the Sierra Nevada. Receiving only light use, this area remains relatively pristine. It is a haven of ecological diversity, and is home to a number of notable large fauna such as the black bear, mule deer, golden eagle, mountain lion, and prairie falcon. In addition to the widespread sagebrush and pinyon-juniper woodland, two plant species are also noted as local to the area: the Nine Mile Canyon phacelia and the monkey flower.
Owens River Headwaters Wilderness		Mono County 37°43′18″N 119°03′26″W	March 31, 2009	14,721 acres (23.002 sq mi; 59.57 km^{2})	7,760–11,549 ft (2,370–3,520 m)	The uppermost headwaters of the Owens River, which goes on to flow through the desert valley that shares its name, are protected by this relatively new wilderness area. San Joaquin Mountain, rising over 11,500 feet above sea level to be the highest peak in the area, overlooks the surrounding wilderness below. This mountain, though, is part of a relatively low section of the Sierra Crest, allowing enough moisture to spill over for dense conifer forests to grow.
Sacatar Trail Wilderness		Inyo and Tulare counties 35°57′20″N 117°59′41″W	1994	51,900 acres (81.1 sq mi; 210 km^{2})	3,541–8,840 ft (1,079–2,690 m)	The Sacatar Trail, a long-since disused wagon train trail, cuts through this wilderness area at the interface between the Sierra Nevada and the Mojave Desert. Wide valleys and rugged peaks characterize the topography of the area. Canyons and gullies present habitats for riparian plant life such as cottonwoods and willows, subsisting on the spring-fed creeks that flow down from the mountains. The area is home to diverse wildlife including such notable species as the golden eagle and the mule deer.
Sequoia-Kings Canyon Wilderness		Fresno and Tulare counties 36°33′53″N 118°46′22″W	1964	808,000 acres (1,262 sq mi; 3,270 km^{2})	1,370–14,505 ft (420–4,421 m)	This wilderness area incorporates all undeveloped areas of Sequoia and Kings Canyon National Parks. It contains many ecosystems in its 13,000 feet (4,000 m) of elevation span, ranging from chaparral foothills to the towering summit of Mount Whitney, the roof of the Sierra. Parts of three Wild and Scenic Rivers flow through the wilderness: the Kern River, the South Fork Kings River, and the Middle Fork Kings River.
South Sierra Wilderness		Tulare and Inyo counties 36°11′01″N 118°06′03″W	1984	62,700 acres (98.0 sq mi; 254 km^{2})	6,100–12,123 ft (1,900–3,695 m)	This wilderness area covers the southernmost part of the Sierra Nevada that contains peaks reaching above the tree line, most notably Olancha Peak, the highest point in the wilderness area at 12,123 feet. This area contains two areas with very different characteristics. The western part, making up most of its area, feeds the headwaters of the South Fork Kern River, has considerable tree cover, and has a gentle landscape by Sierra standards, taking the form of a gently rolling high plateau with wide meadows filling the valleys in between isolated mountain peaks. The eastern part is diametrically opposite, with sheer cliffs, deep canyons, and barren treeless desert slopes characterizing the terrain in which the Sierra Crest drops over a vertical mile to the Owens Valley in the space of only a few horizontal miles. Kennedy Meadows is a popular jumping-off point for visitors to this wilderness area.
Yosemite Wilderness		Madera, Mariposa, Mono, and Tuolumne counties 37°51′N 119°33′W	1984	704,264 acres (1,100.413 sq mi; 2,850.06 km^{2})	2,000–13,114 ft (610–3,997 m)	All undeveloped areas of Yosemite National Park, comprising 94 percent of the park's total area, are designated as wilderness. This area contains most of Yosemite's high country, including all of the scarcely visited northern half of the park, on the far side of the Grand Canyon of the Tuolumne. These areas, while mostly lacking the striking relief of Yosemite Valley (which is located outside the wilderness area), still contain numerous geologically interesting landscapes, and with diverse environments ranging from mid-elevation meadows in the northwest to Mount Dana, whose summit is the highest point in the park at over 13,000 feet (4,000 m).

== Other federal protected areas ==
- Blue Ridge National Wildlife Refuge
- Jawbone–Butterbredt Area of Critical Environmental Concern
- The Red Hills of Tuolumne County Area of Critical Environmental Concern

== State parks ==
- Burton Creek State Park
- Calaveras Big Trees State Park
- D. L. Bliss State Park
- Donner Memorial State Park
- Ed Z'berg Sugar Pine Point State Park
- Emerald Bay State Park
- Grover Hot Springs State Park
- Lake Tahoe–Nevada State Park (Nevada)
- Plumas-Eureka State Park
- South Yuba River State Park
- Van Sickle Bi-State Park (co-managed by California and Nevada)
- Washoe Meadows State Park

== State recreation areas ==
- Auburn State Recreation Area
- Folsom Lake State Recreation Area
- Kings Beach State Recreation Area
- Lake Oroville State Recreation Area
- Lake Valley State Recreation Area
- Millerton Lake State Recreation Area
- Tahoe State Recreation Area

== State forests ==
- Mount Zion Demonstration State Forest
- Mountain Home Demonstration State Forest

== State historic parks ==
- Columbia State Historic Park
- Empire Mine State Historic Park
- Indian Grinding Rock State Historic Park
- Malakoff Diggins State Historic Park
- Marshall Gold Discovery State Historic Park
- Railtown 1897 State Historic Park
- Wassama Round House State Historic Park

== See also ==
- Protected areas of California
- Protected areas of the United States
