= List of Sierra Nevada topics =

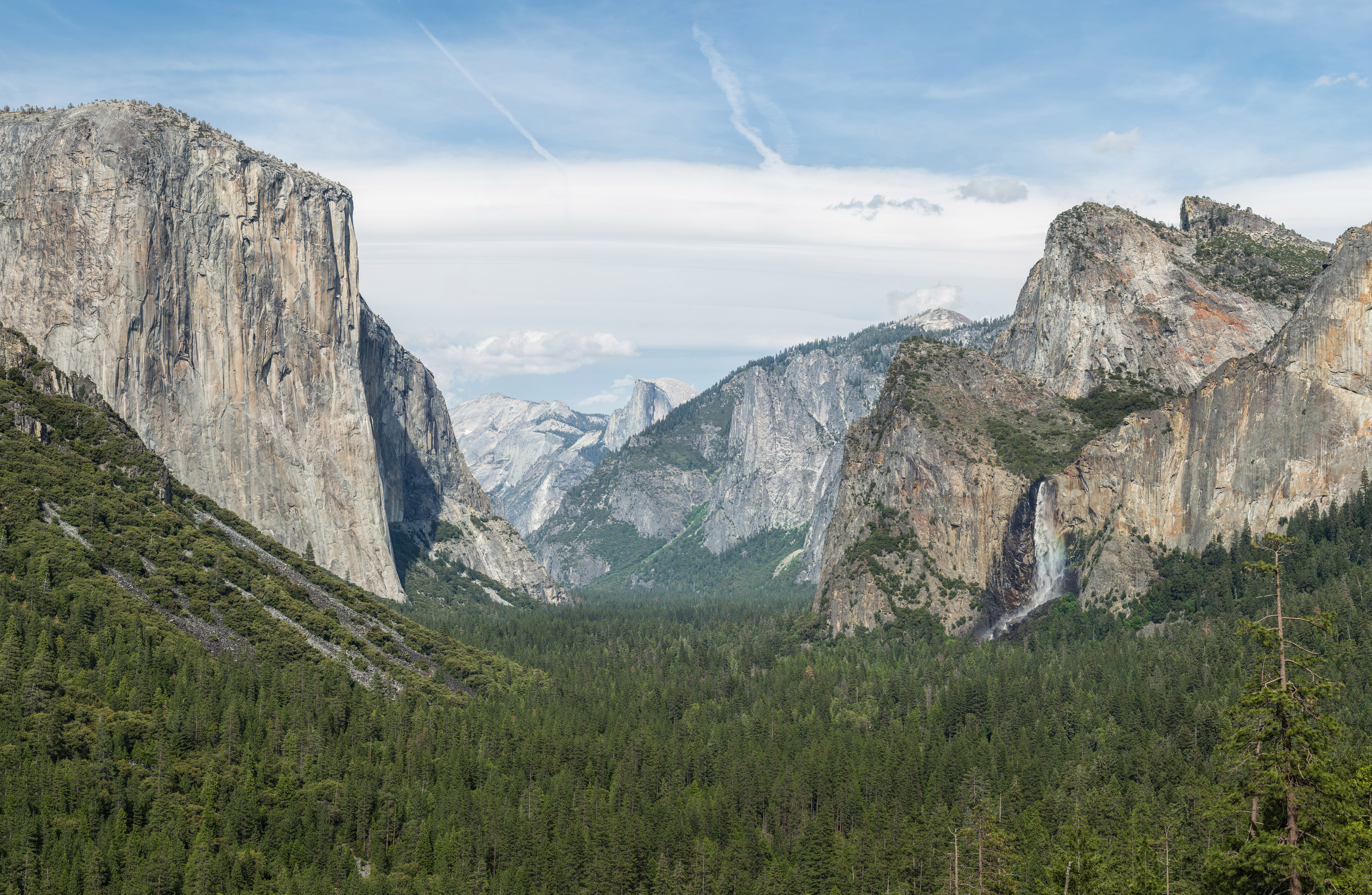
Yosemite Valley

This list is about the Sierra Nevada of California, United States.

== Principal mountains ==
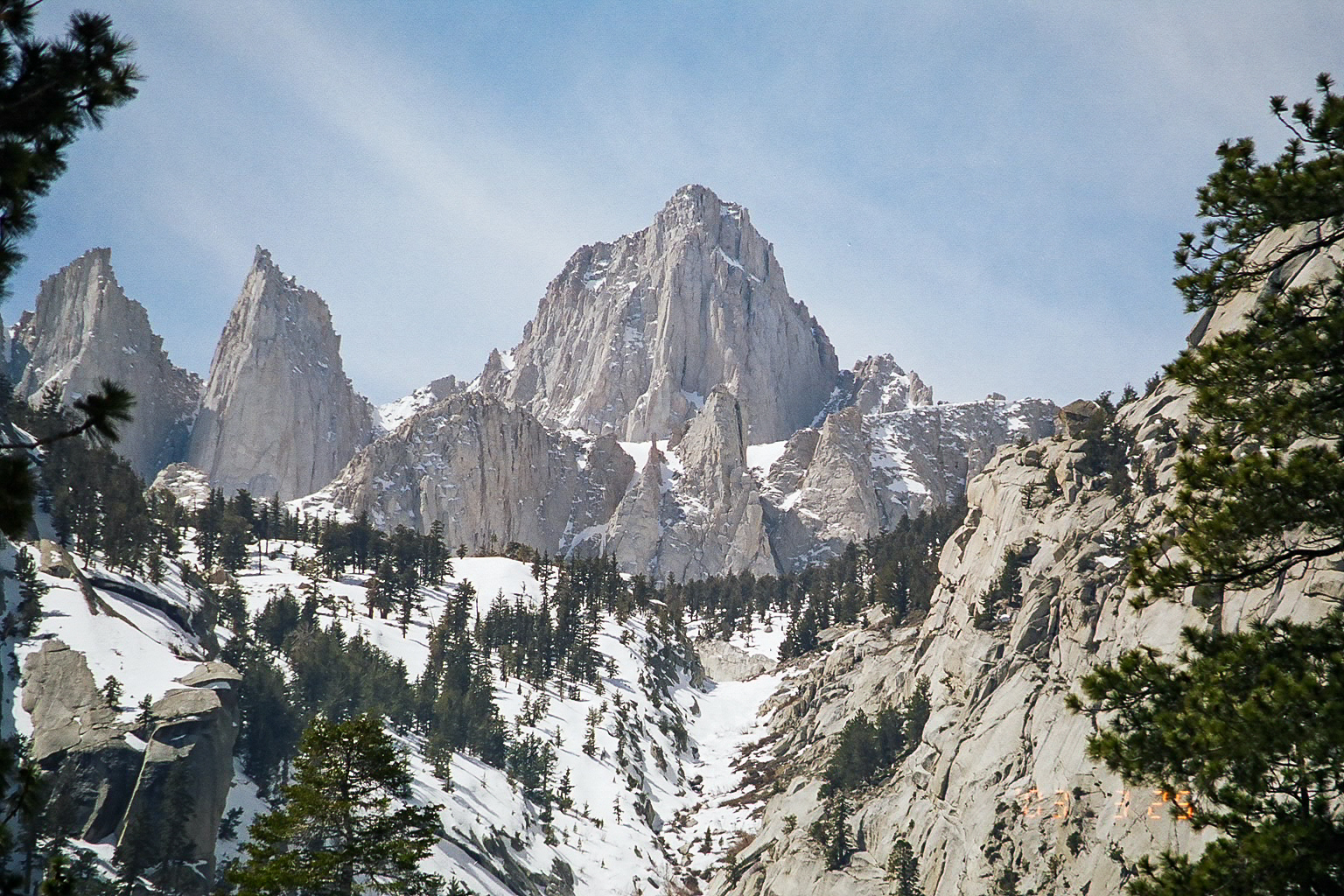
Mount Whitney

List of mountains over 14,000 ft (4250 m) with 300 ft (90 m) of prominence:

- Mount Whitney 14,505 ft (4421 m)
- Mount Williamson 14,403 ft (4390 m)
- North Palisade 14,242 ft (4341 m)
- Mount Sill 14,153 ft (4314 m)
- Mount Russell 14,094 ft (4296 m)
- Split Mountain 14,064 ft (4286 m)
- Mount Langley 14,025 ft (4280 m)
- Mount Tyndall 14,019 ft (4273 m)
- Middle Palisade 14,012 ft (4271 m)
- Mount Muir 14,012 ft (4271 m)

Other notable peaks:

- Lost Corner Mountain
- Mount Baxter
- Black Kaweah
- Castle Peak
- Cathedral Peak
- Johnson Peak, the highest mountain in Tuolumne Meadows
- El Capitan
- Mount Conness
- Mount Dana
- Mount Darwin
- Mount Davis
- Fresno Dome
- Mount Gibbs
- Half Dome
- Mount Hopkins
- Mount Humphreys
- Mount Huntington
- Lembert Dome
- Liberty Cap
- Mount Lyell
- Maggies Peaks
- Mammoth Mountain
- Matterhorn Peak
- The Minarets
- Mount Morgan
- Mount Morrison
- Pyramid Peak
- Red Kaweah
- Red Slate Mountain
- Mount Ritter
- Shuteye Peak
- Thunderbolt Peak
- Mount Tom

=== Subranges ===
- Carson Range
- Cathedral Range
- Clark Range
- Crystal Range
- Great Western Divide
- Kaweah Peaks Ridge
- Palisades
- Ritter Range
- Sherwin Range

== Counties in the Sierra ==
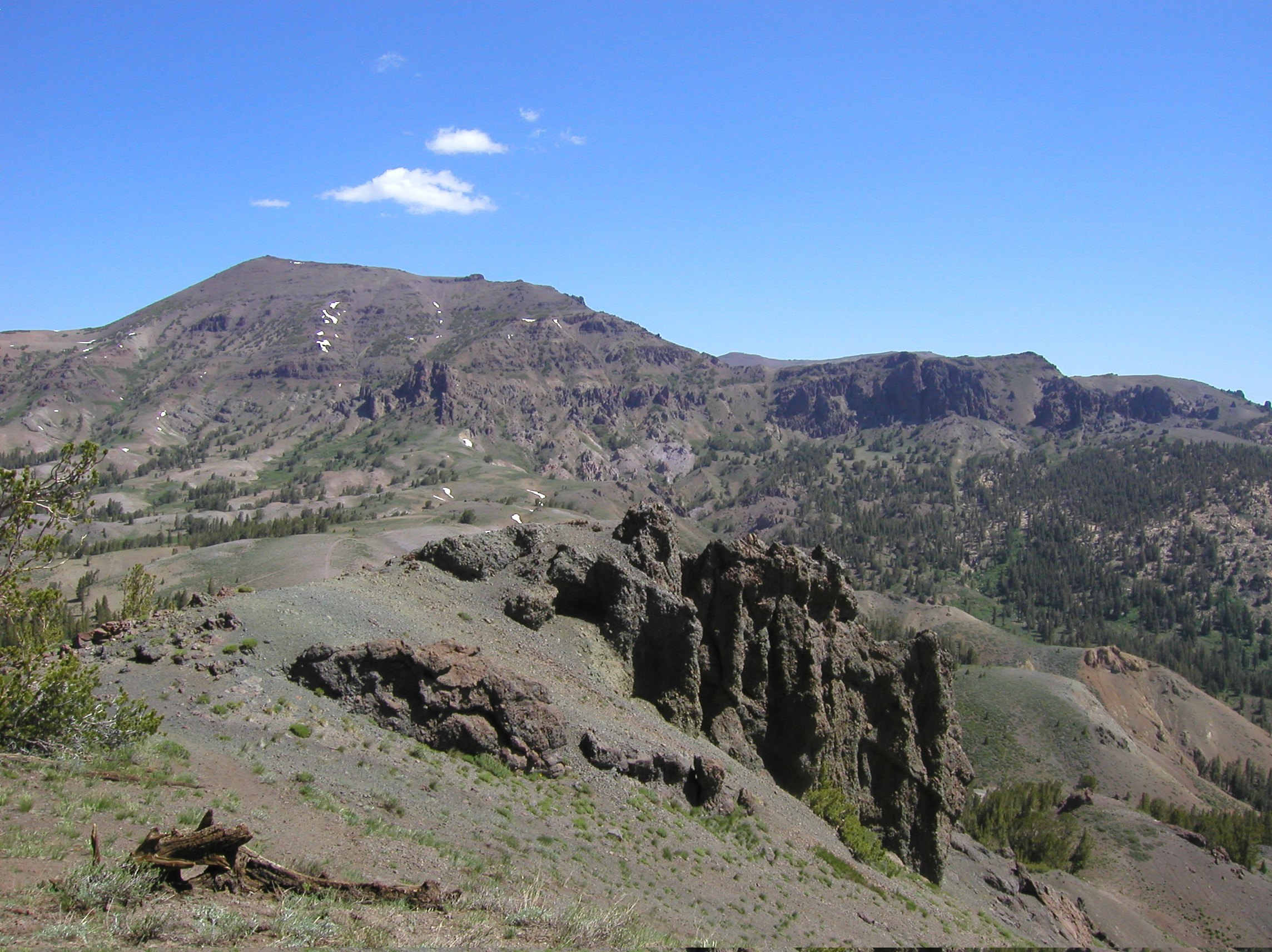
Sonora Peak, highest point in Alpine County

- Alpine County, California
- Amador County, California
- Butte County, California
- Calaveras County, California
- El Dorado County, California
- Fresno County, California
- Inyo County, California
- Kern County, California
- Madera County, California
- Mariposa County, California
- Mono County, California
- Nevada County, California
- Placer County, California
- Plumas County, California
- Sierra County, California
- Tulare County, California
- Tuolumne County, California
- Yuba County, California

The Carson Range (a spur of the Sierra) extends into Nevada:

- Douglas County, Nevada
- Carson City, Nevada
- Washoe County, Nevada

== Principal rivers ==
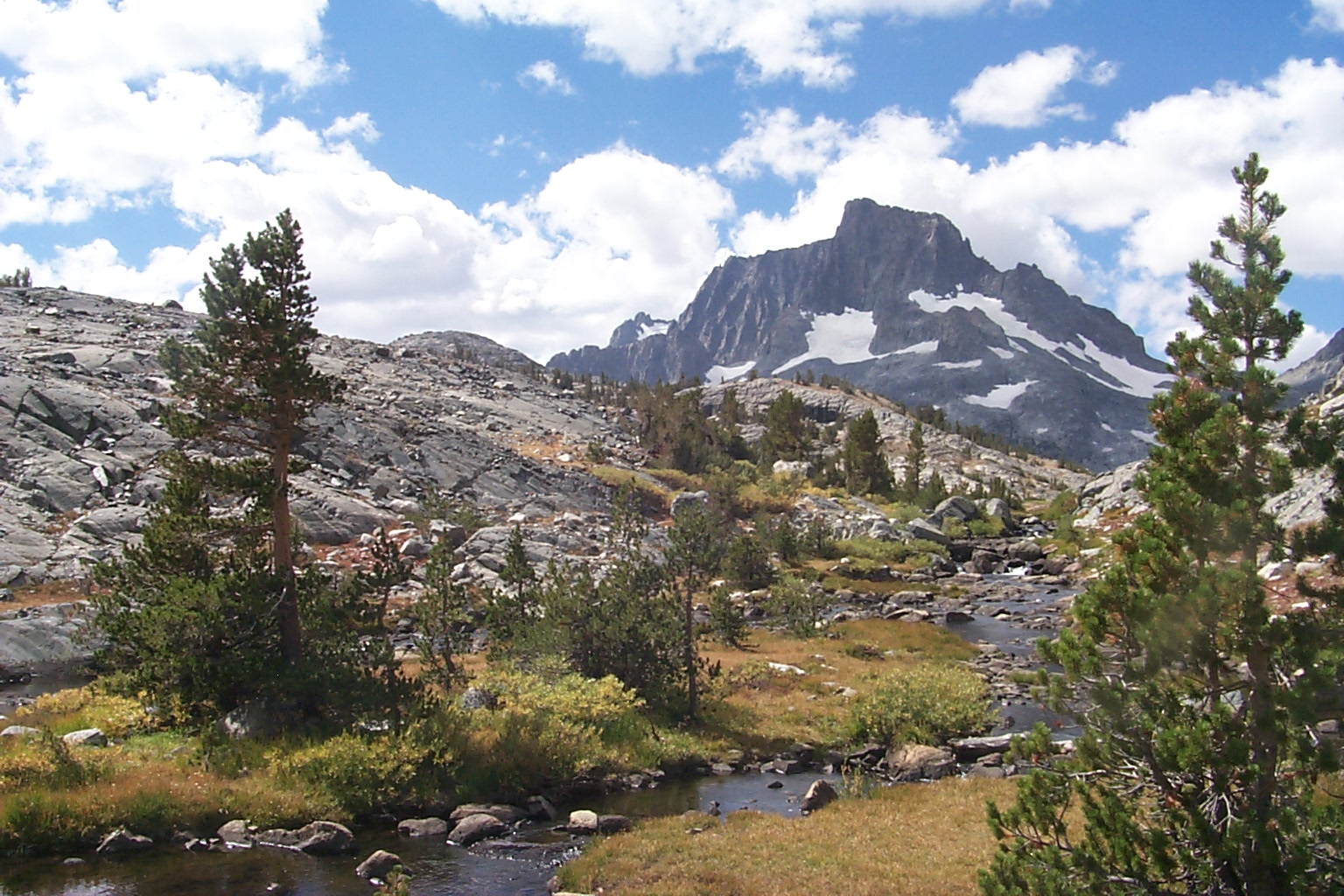
The headwaters of the San Joaquin River

- American River
- Cosumnes River
- Feather River
- Kern River
- Kings River
- Merced River
- Mokelumne River
- Sacramento River
- San Joaquin River
- Stanislaus River
- Truckee River
- Tuolumne River
- Yuba River

== Prominent Lakes ==
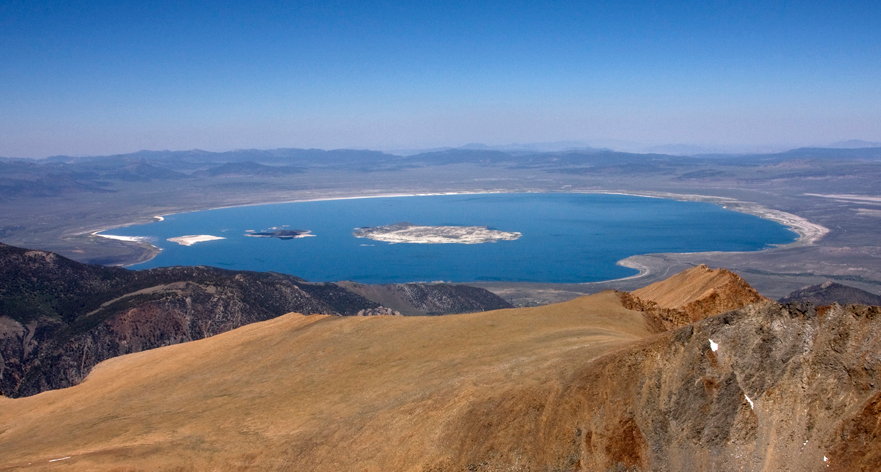
Mono Lake as seen from Mount Dana.

- Lake Tahoe
- Bass Lake
- Beardsley Lake
- Cherry Lake
- Mono Lake
- New Melones Lake
- Pinecrest Lake
- Tioga Lake
- Tulloch Lake
- Twain Harte Lake

== Other natural features ==
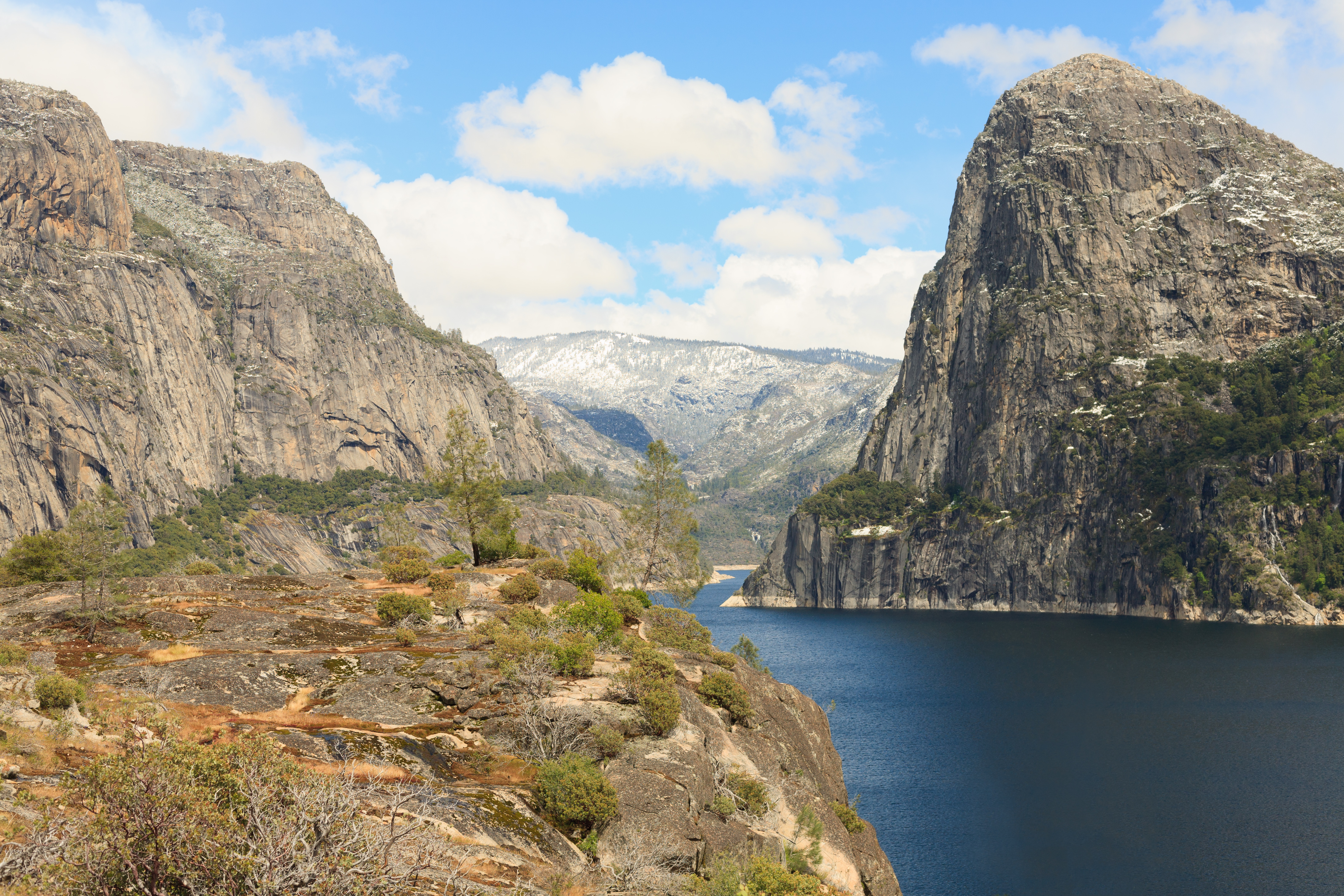
Hetch Hetchy Valley

- Devil's Postpile
- Grand Canyon of the Tuolumne River
- Hetch Hetchy Valley
- Kings Canyon
- Long Valley Caldera
- Owens Valley
- San Joaquin Valley
- Sacramento Valley
- Tuolumne Meadows
- Yosemite Valley
- List of waterfalls in Yosemite National Park

== National parks and monuments ==
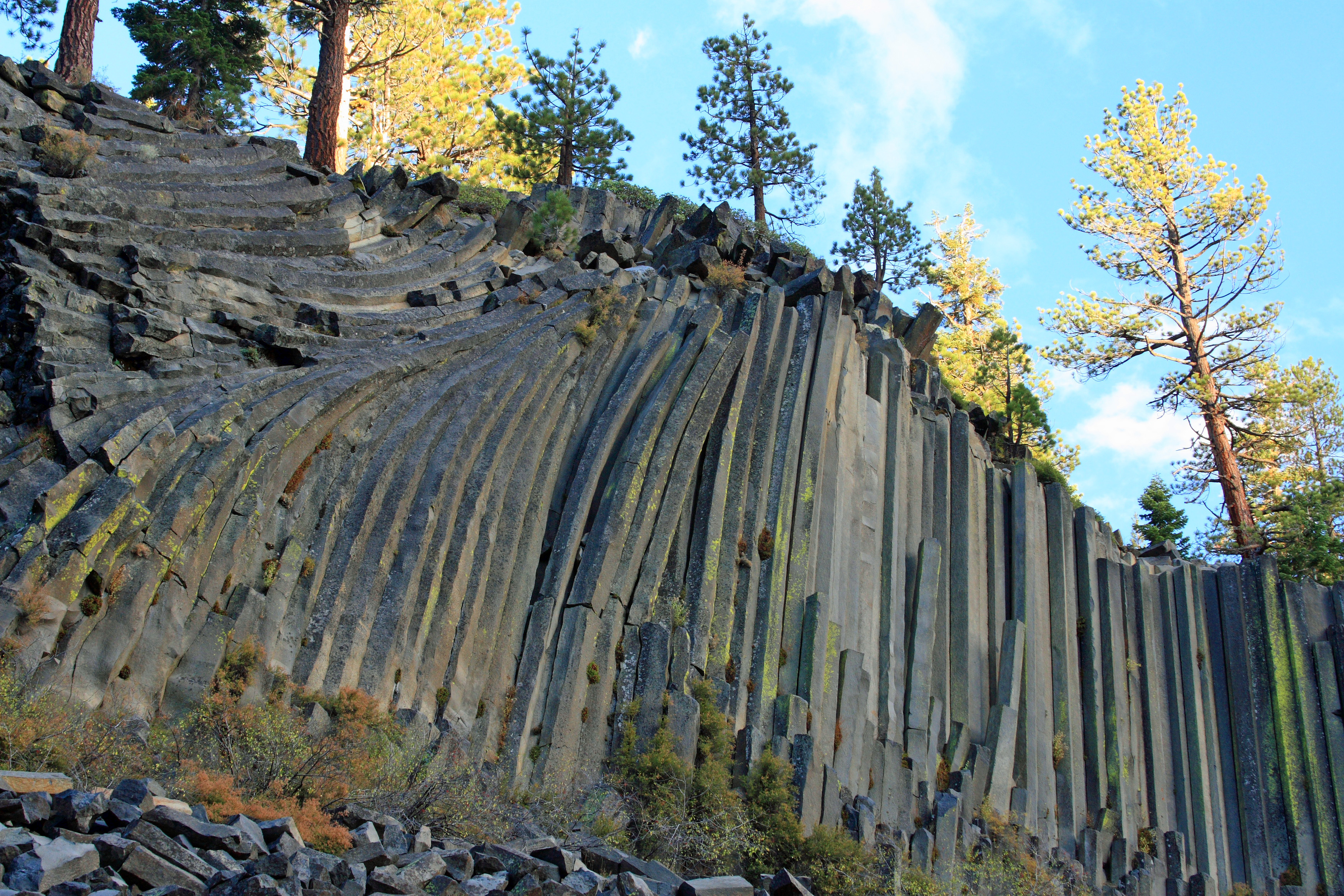
Devils Postpile

North to south:

- Yosemite National Park
- Kings Canyon National Park
- Sequoia National Park
- Giant Sequoia National Monument

Eastern side of the Sierra:

- Devil's Postpile National Monument

== National forests ==
- Eldorado National Forest
- Humboldt-Toiyabe National Forest
- Inyo National Forest
- Lake Tahoe Basin Management Unit
- Plumas National Forest
- Sequoia National Forest
- Sierra National Forest
- Stanislaus National Forest
- Tahoe National Forest

== Wilderness areas ==
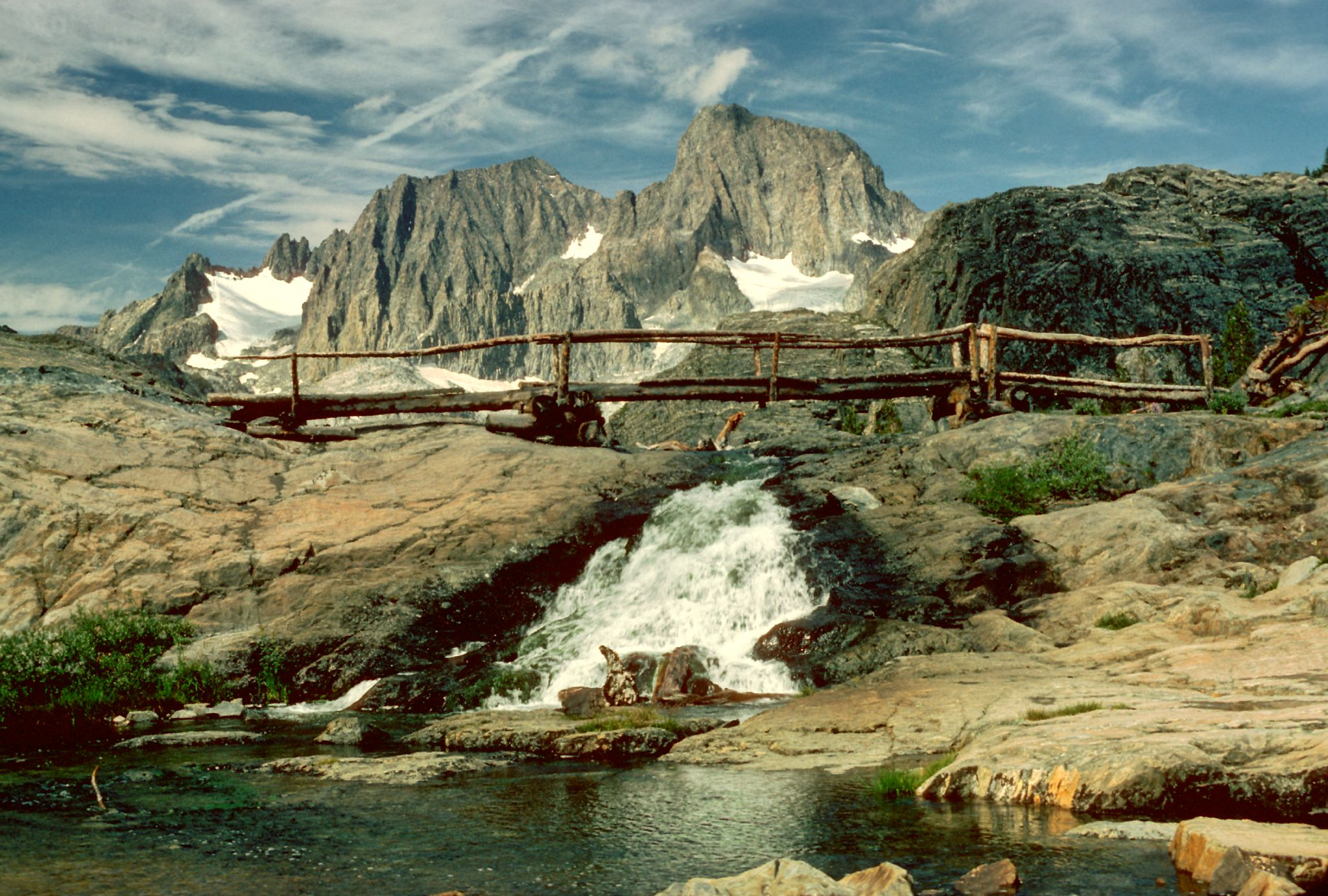
Mount Ritter and Banner Peak in the Ansel Adams Wilderness

A total of over 3,726,000 acres (15,080 km^{2}) in 26 separate areas

- Ansel Adams
- Bright Star
- Bucks Lake
- Carson-Iceberg
- Chimney Peak
- Desolation
- Dinkey Lakes
- Domeland
- Emigrant
- Golden Trout
- Granite Chief
- Hoover
- Jennie Lakes
- John Krebs
- John Muir
- Kaiser
- Kiavah
- Mokelumne
- Monarch
- Mount Rose
- Owens Peak
- Owens River Headwaters
- Sacatar Trail
- Sequoia-Kings Canyon
- South Sierra
- Yosemite

== State Parks ==
=== California ===
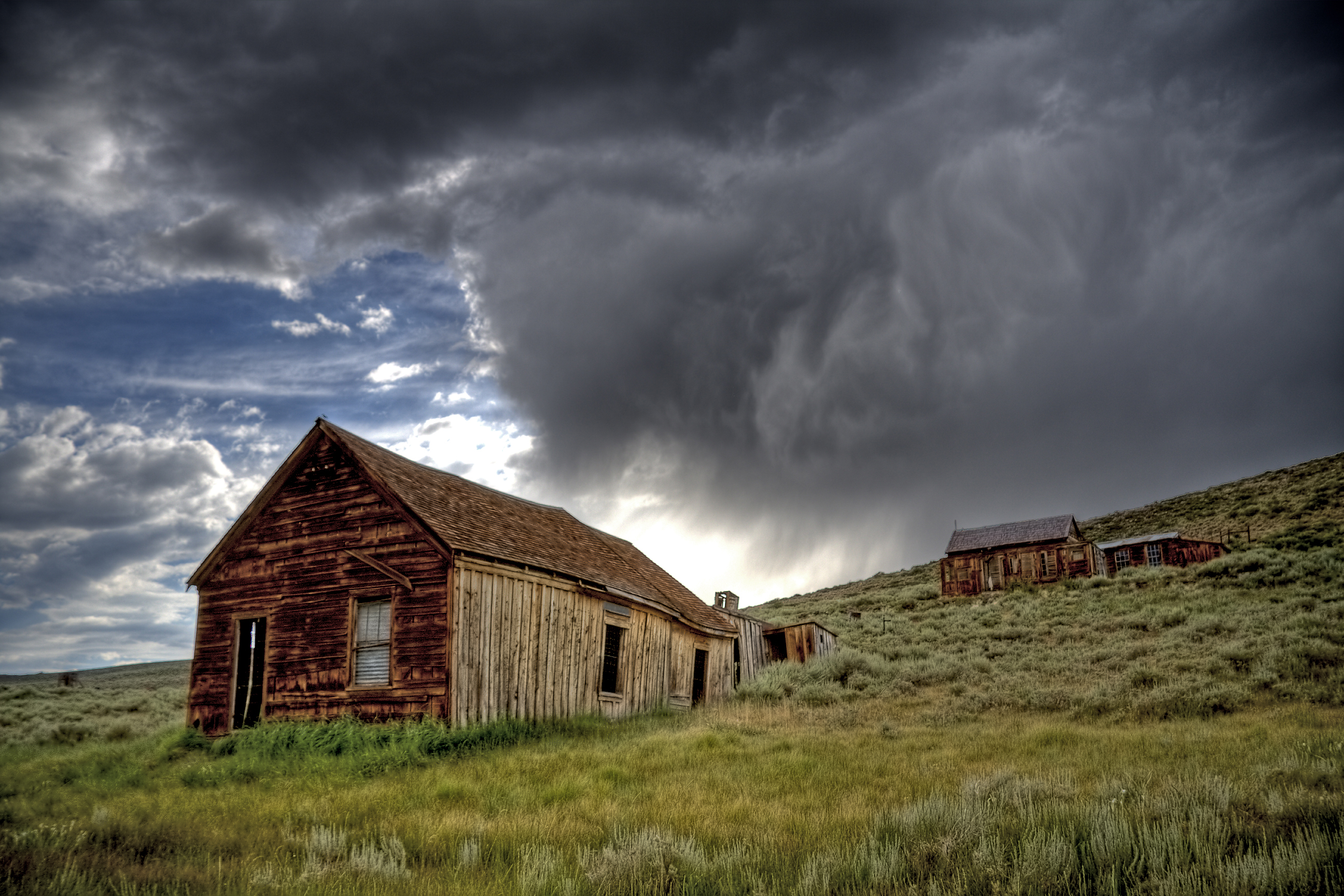
Bodie State Historic Park

- Auburn State Recreation Area
- Bodie State Historic Park
- Burton Creek State Park
- Calaveras Big Trees State Park
- California State Mining and Mineral Museum Park Property
- Columbia State Historic Park
- D. L. Bliss State Park
- Donner Memorial State Park
- Emerald Bay State Park
- Empire Mine State Historic Park
- Folsom Lake State Recreation Area
- Folsom Powerhouse State Historic Park
- Grover Hot Springs State Park
- Indian Grinding Rock State Historic Park
- Kings Beach State Recreation Area
- Lake Valley State Recreation Area
- Malakoff Diggins State Historic Park
- Marshall Gold Discovery State Historic Park
- Millerton Lake State Recreation Area
- Mono Lake Tufa State Reserve
- Prairie City State Vehicular Recreation Area
- Railtown 1897 State Historic Park
- South Yuba River State Park
- Stone Lake Park Property
- Sugar Pine Point Light
- Tahoe State Recreation Area
- Ward Creek Park Property
- Washoe Meadows State Park
- Wassama Round House State Historic Park

=== Nevada ===
- Dayton State Park
- Lake Tahoe-Nevada State Park
- Mormon Station State Historic Park
- Washoe Lake State Park

== Trails and routes ==
- John Muir Trail
- Pacific Crest Trail
- Four Mile Trail
- Hetch Hetchy to Lake Vernon Trail
- High Sierra Trail
- Independence Trail
- Lower Sagehen Creek Hiking Trail
- Mist Trail
- Mount Whitney Trail
- Sierra High Route
- Silver Knapsack Trail
- Tahoe Rim Trail
- Tahoe–Yosemite Trail
- Theodore Solomons Trail
- Trans-Sierra Highway

== Giant sequoia ==
General Sherman Tree

- Converse Basin Grove
- Boole (tree)
- General Sherman Tree
- General Grant (tree)
- General Noble (tree)
- Giant Forest
- The President (tree)
- Lincoln (tree)
- Nelder Grove
- Mariposa Grove
- Mark Twain Tree
- Stagg (tree)
- Redwood Mountain Grove

== Mountain passes ==
- Carson Pass
- Donner Pass
- Ebbetts Pass
- Forester Pass
- Fredonyer Pass
- Glen Pass
- Morgan Summit
- Muir Pass
- Pacific Grade Summit
- Sherman Pass
- Sonora Pass
- Tehachapi Pass
- Tioga Pass
- Walker Pass

== Fires ==
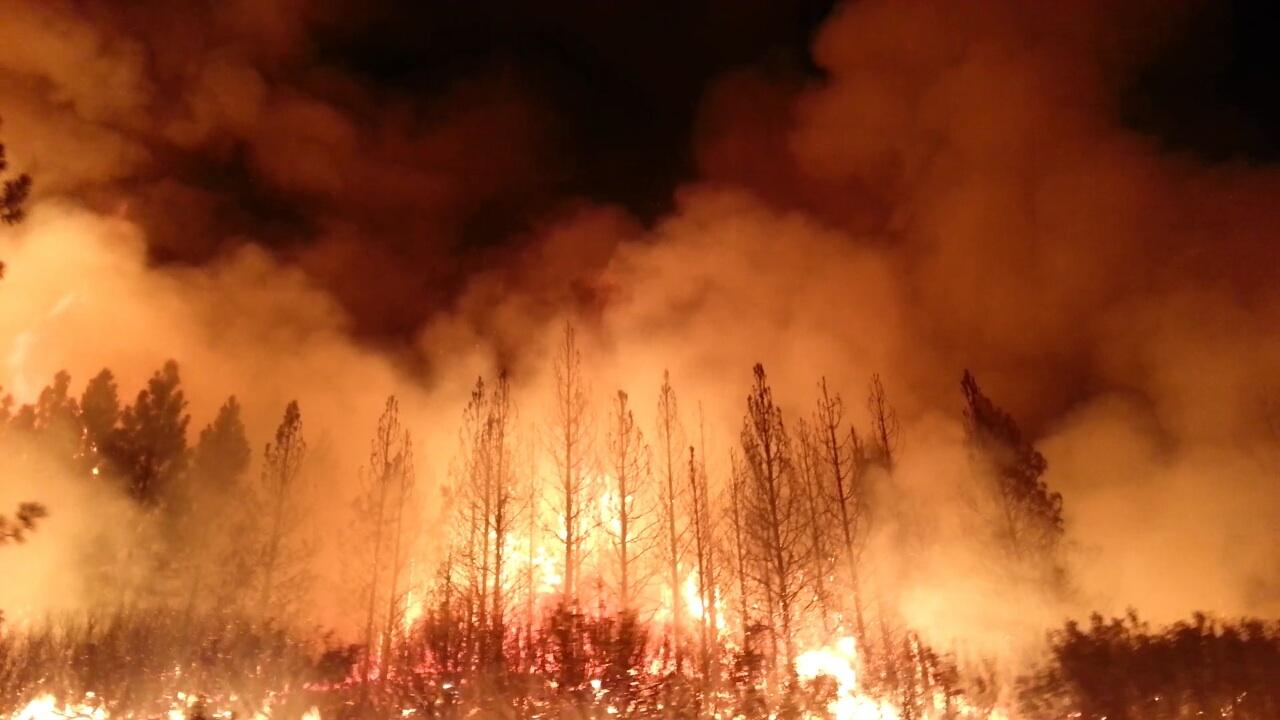
Rim Fire

- Cedar Fire (2003)
- Rim Fire (2013)
- Thomas Fire (2017)
- Mendocino Complex (2018)
- August Complex fire (2020)
- North Complex Fire (2020)
- LNU Lightning Complex fires (2020)
- SCU Lightning Complex fires (2020)
- SQF Complex (2020)
- Creek Fire (2020)
- Caldor Fire (2021)
- Dixie Fire (2021)
- Oak Fire (2022)
- Washburn Fire (2022)

== People related to the Sierra Nevada ==
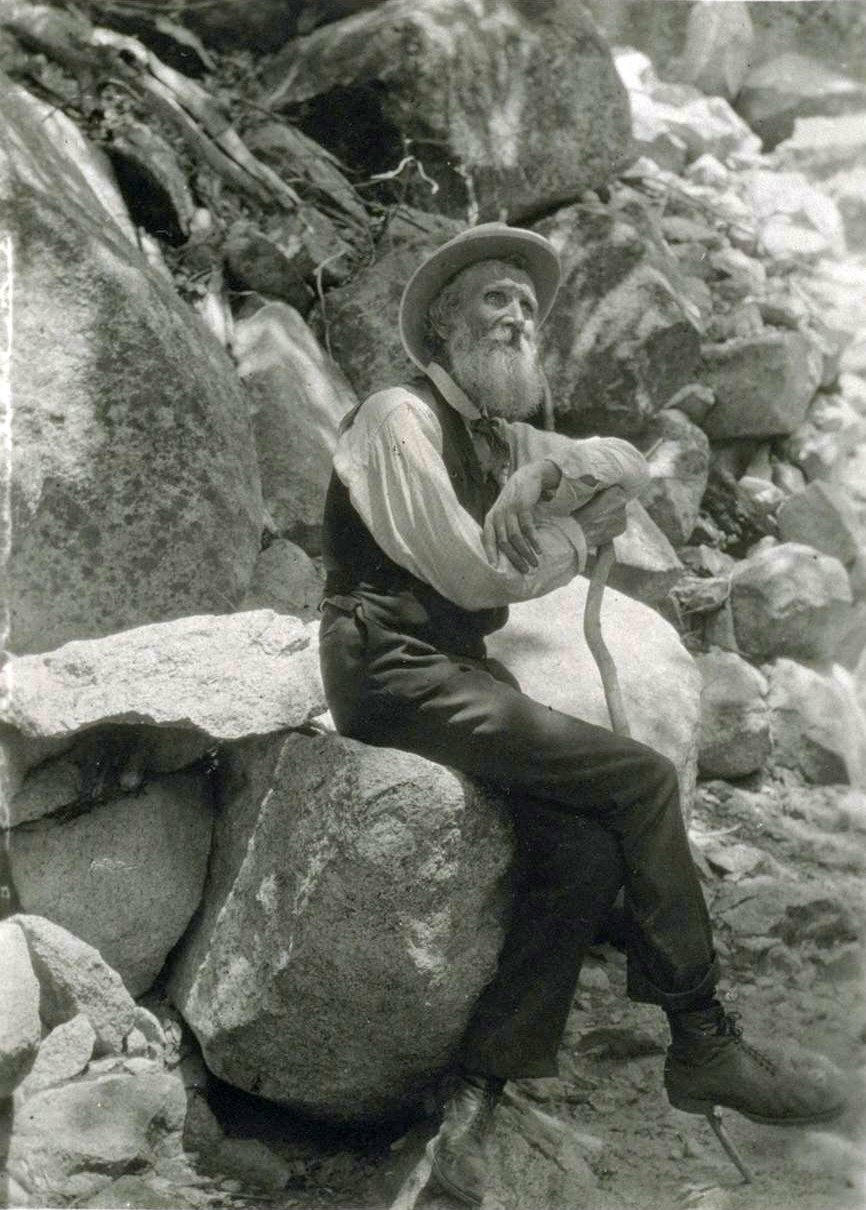
John Muir

- Ansel Adams
- Lafayette Bunnell
- Kit Carson
- Galen Clark
- Norman Clyde
- C.C. Curtis
- Francis P. Farquhar
- James Mason Hutchings
- Joseph LeConte
- Joseph Nisbet LeConte
- John Muir
- Jim Savage
- Carl Sharsmith
- Theodore Solomons
- Walter A. Starr, Jr.
- Chief Tenaya
- Snowshoe Thompson
- Josiah Whitney

== Relevant list articles ==
- List of first ascents in the Sierra Nevada (U.S.)
- List of Sierra Nevada road passes
- List of Yosemite destinations

== See also ==
- Bibliography of the Sierra Nevada
