= McIver's Cabin =

Coordinates: 35.621848°N 118.073236°W

McIver’s Cabin
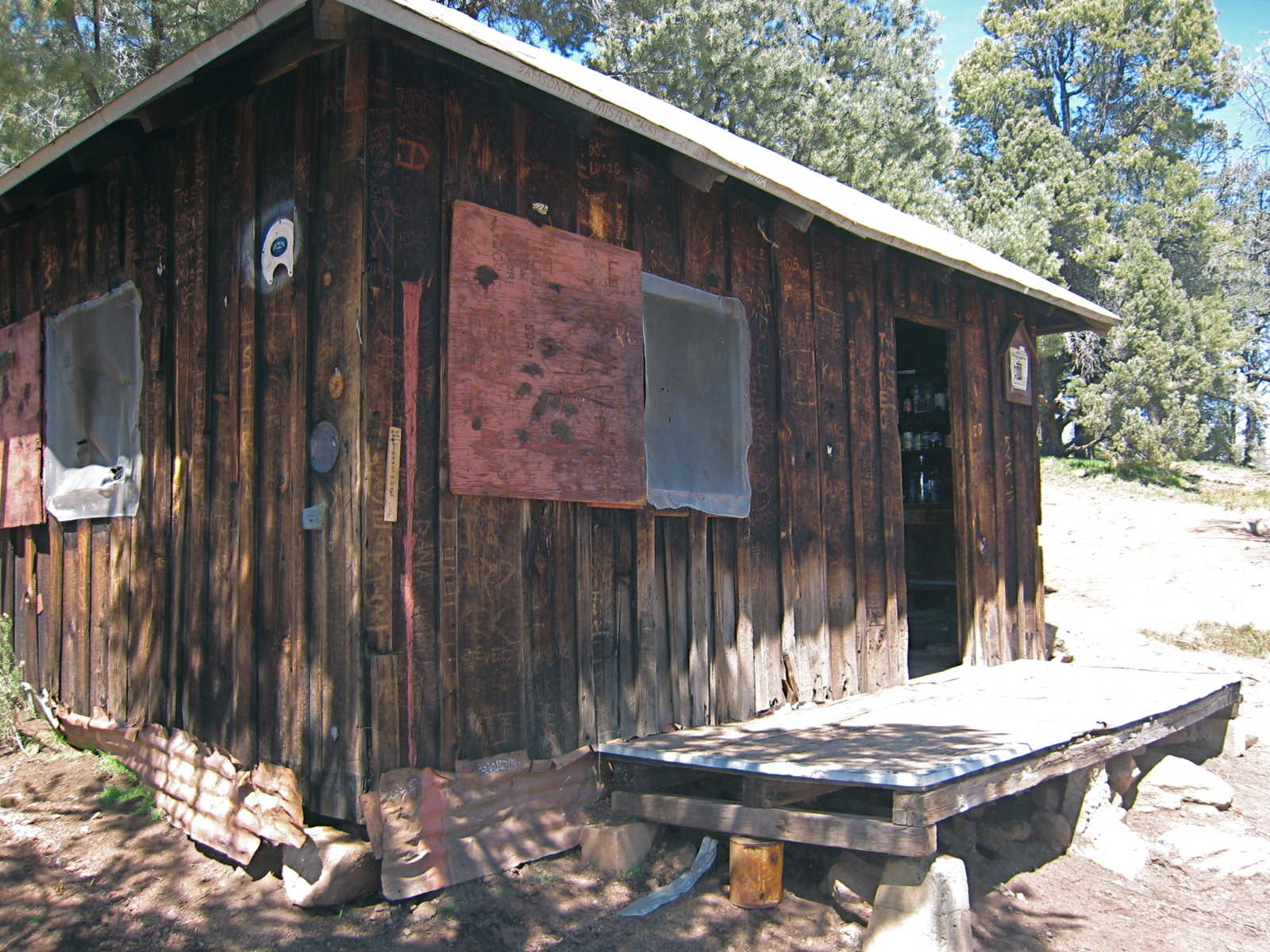
- Located in the Scodie Mountains
- Interactive map of the McIver’s Cabin area

General information
- Type: Cabin
- Location: Sequoia National Forest, California, USA
- Completed: 1938
- Owner: Murdo George McIver

McIver's Cabin is a popular destination for off-road enthusiasts and serves as a shelter for hikers of the Pacific Crest Trail (PCT). It is located at about 6690 ft. near the Kiavah Wilderness, in the Scodie Mountains area of the Sequoia National Forest near the PCT and at the end of the McIver 4X4 road part of forest service road 27S11. It was purchased in 1938 by Murdo George McIver and moved from Sand Canyon, where it was used in building the Los Angeles Aqueduct, to its present location. Miner McIver chose the location due to its proximity to his mining claim and a source of natural spring water, later named McIver's Spring. McIver was born January 5, 1893, in Hoople, North Dakota, and died May 11, 1981, in Bakersfield, California.

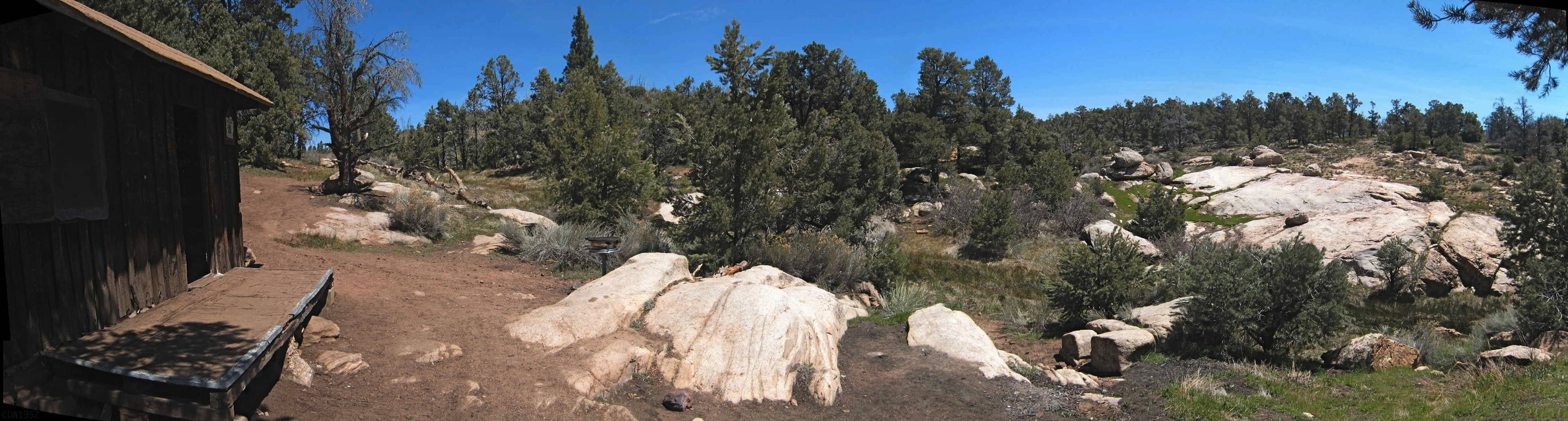
Panned from West to North in front of cabin.(click to enlarge)

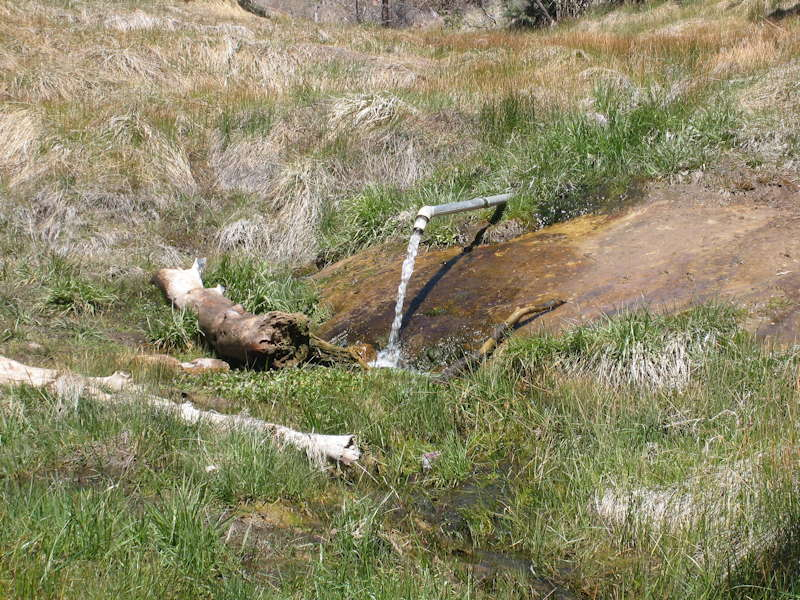
McIver's spring near McIver's Cabin, a source of potable water.
