= Scodie =

Scodie may refer to:

- Scodie, California, former name of Onyx, California
- Scodie Mountains
