= Owens Peak =

Mountain in California, United States

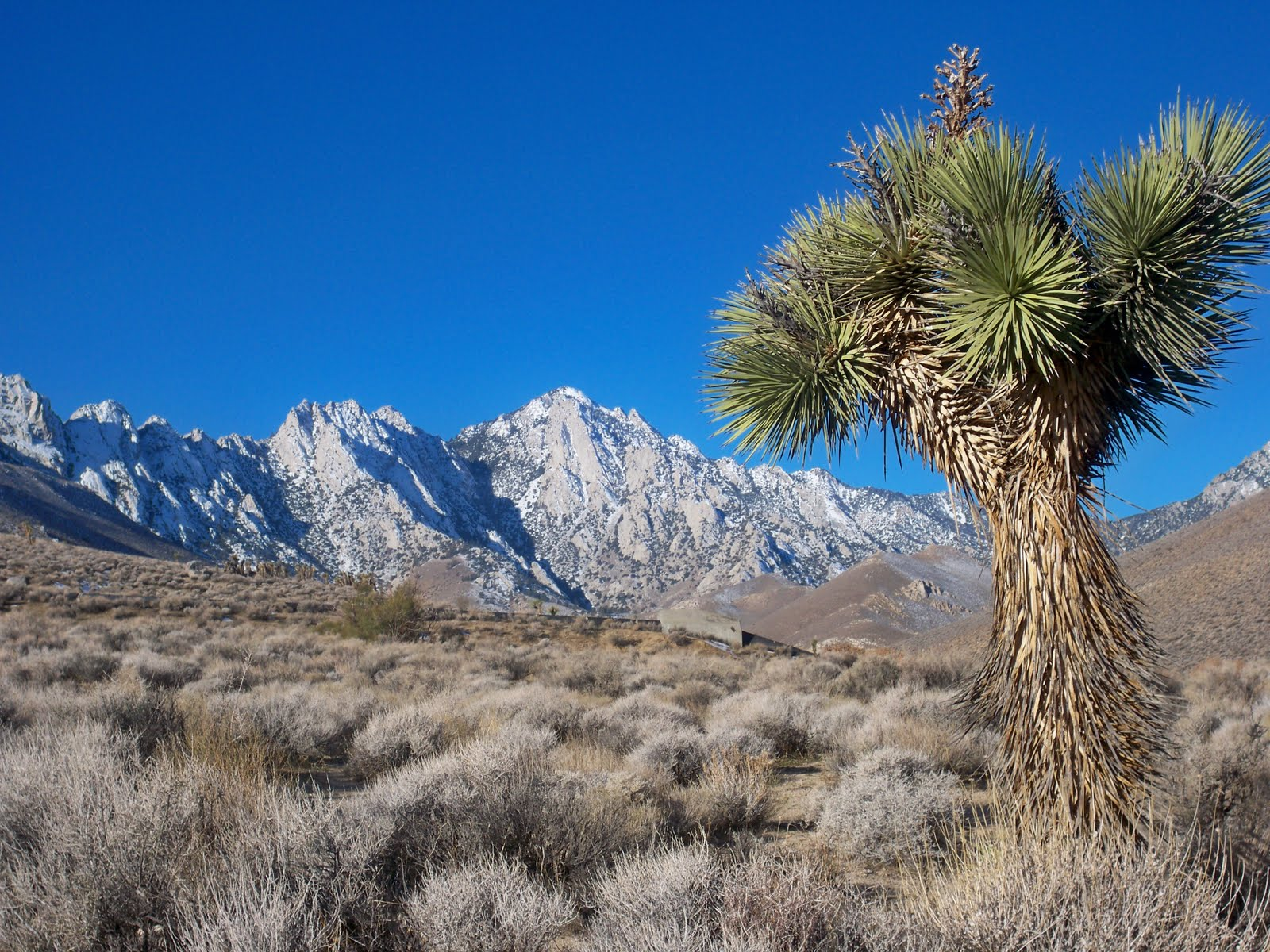

Highest point
- Elevation: 8,452 ft (2,576 m) NAVD 88
- Prominence: 2,173 ft (662 m)
- Listing: Sierra Peaks Section; Hundred Peaks Section
- Coordinates: 35°44′18″N 117°59′49″W

Geography
- Location within California
- Location: Kern County, California, U.S.
- Parent range: Sierra Nevada
- Topo map: USGS Owens Peak

Climbing
- Easiest route: Hike, class 2

Owens Peak is the highest point in the southern Sierra Nevada, at more than 8,400 feet (2,600 m) above sea level. The peak stands near the center of the Owens Peak Wilderness, which was designated by the United States Congress in 1994, and it now has a total of 74,060 acres (299.7 km^{2}). The eastern watershed of Owens Peak is composed of three main canyons: Grapevine Canyon, Short Canyon, and Indian Wells Canyon (north to south, respectively). The Sierra Nevada meets the Great Basin and the Mojave Desert here, creating an unusual ecosystem.

Owens Peak is located in Kern County, about 12 miles (19 km) west-northwest of Inyokern and 159 miles (256 km) north of Los Angeles.

== History ==
Owens Peak is named after Richard Owens (1812–1902), an Ohio-born explorer (aka "Owings"), who accompanied John C. Frémont on his third expedition to California (1845–1846). Frémont also named a valley, river and lake for Owens, whom he considered "cool, brave and of good judgment". Owens served as a captain in Frémont's California Battalion during the Mexican–American War and was California's Secretary of State during Frémont's brief tenure as governor (1847).
