= Jawbone Canyon =

Mojave Desert protected area, California, U.S.

Coordinates: 35.31°N 118.03°W

Jawbone Canyon, with Blue Point visible at center

Jawbone Canyon is a geographic feature in the Mojave Desert and a Bureau of Land Management area located in Kern County, California, 20 miles (32 km) north of Mojave on CA 14 near Cantil, CA. The area is a popular destination for hikers and off road vehicle enthusiasts.

== History ==
Europeans first settled in the canyon around 1860—naming it Jawbone because its shape resembled a mandible—and the trail was used as a trade route from Keyesville into the Piute Mountains (not to be confused with the Piute Mountains of the eastern Mojave Desert). During the Kern River gold rush, several gold mines operated in the canyon; the most successful of these, the St. John mine, yielded nearly $700,000 worth of gold between 1860 and 1875. The Gwynn mine, on the Geringer Grade, ran six claims yielding a total of $770,000 worth of gold and quartz before ceasing operations in 1942. Mining continued throughout the 1940s, mainly focused on rhyolite and antimony.

The area has been used for recreation since the early 20th century. A scientific study, published in 1983, shows that extensive environmental damage had been caused by off road vehicles operating in Jawbone Canyon. Although off-roading is still permitted in the recreation area, as the Jawbone-Butterbredt Area of Critical Environmental Concern riders are restricted to established trails.

== Features ==
- The largest sag pipe of the Los Angeles Aqueduct crosses through Jawbone. At the time of construction, Chief Engineer William Mulholland referred to this section as the "Jawbone Siphon".
- Blue Point, a large hill covered with blue-green stone, marks the entrance to Alphie Canyon. The color is due to oxidized copper in the rock.
- The Tehachapi Pass Wind Farm is visible from the eastern end of the trail.
- Jawbone Canyon road terminates at Piute Mountain Road, inside Sequoia National Forest.
- Jawbone-Butterbredt Area of Critical Environmental Concern
Large deposits of volcanic rock in Jawbone Canyon

The floor of Jawbone Canyon

The north-east of Jawbone Canyon

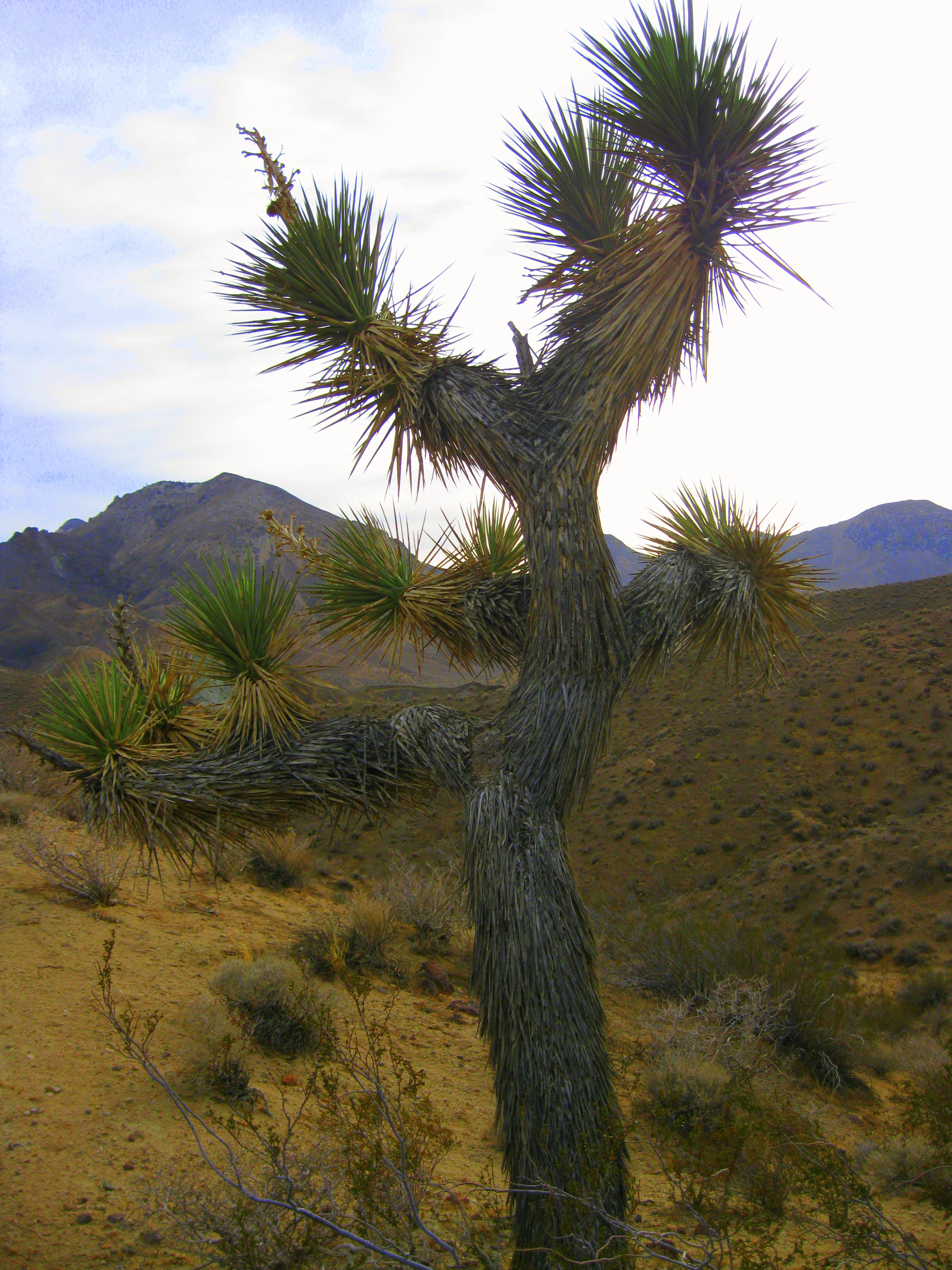
Yucca brevifolia or Joshua tree at Jawbone Canyon

Sandstone caves in Jawbone Canyon

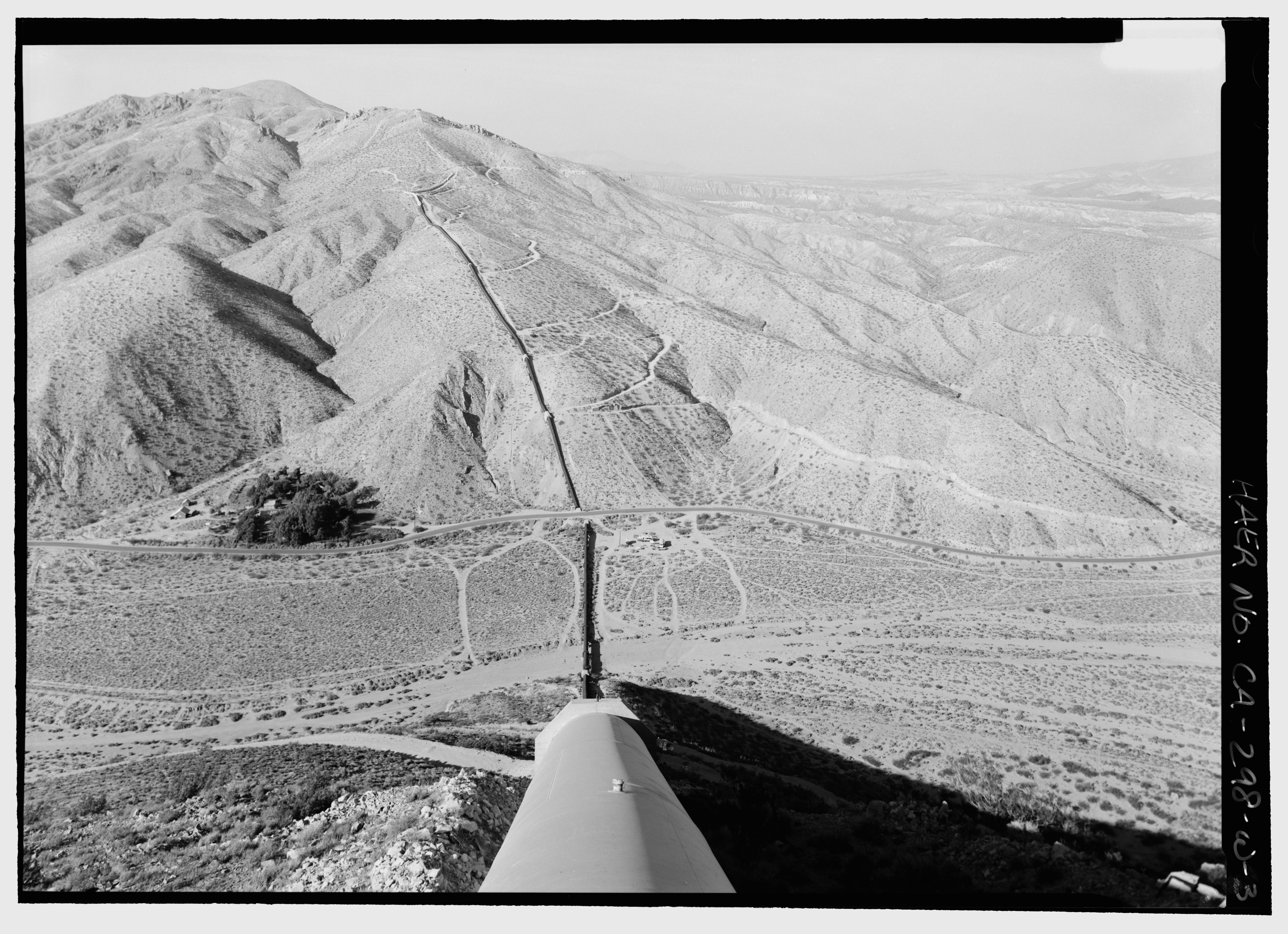
Looking north along the Los Angeles Aqueduct in Jawbone Canyon

== See also ==
=== Articles ===
- Red Rock Canyon State Park (California)
- Burro Schmidt Tunnel

=== Index ===
- Category: Flora of the California desert regions
- Category: Fauna of the Mojave Desert
- Category: Protected areas of the Mojave Desert
