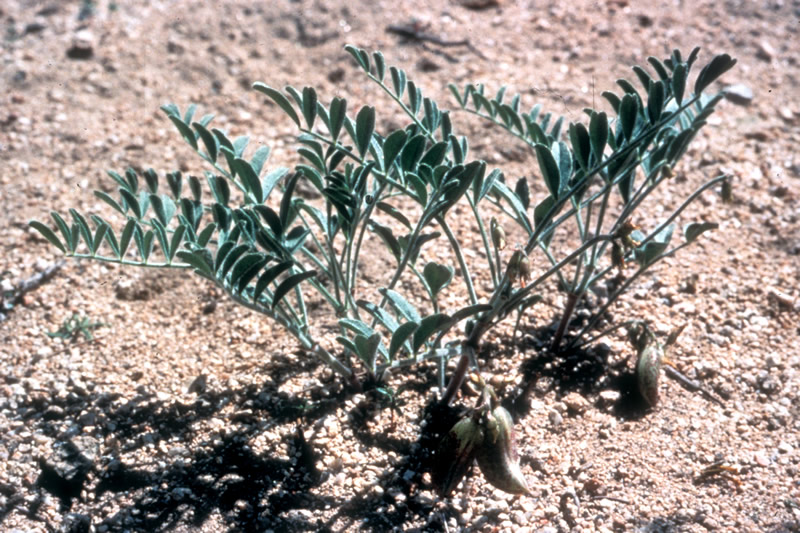

Conservation status
- Critically Imperiled (NatureServe)

Scientific classification
- Kingdom: Plantae
- Clade: Embryophytes
- Clade: Tracheophytes
- Clade: Angiosperms
- Clade: Eudicots
- Clade: Rosids
- Order: Fabales
- Family: Fabaceae
- Subfamily: Faboideae
- Genus: Astragalus
- Species: A. ertterae

Binomial name
- Astragalus ertterae Barneby & Shevock

= Astragalus ertterae =

Walker Pass milkvetch

Species of legume

Astragalus ertterae is a rare species of milkvetch known by the common name Walker Pass milkvetch. It is endemic to California, where it is known from only three occurrences near Walker Pass in the Sierra Nevada. It is endangered by trampling, trail use, and also grazing.

It is only found in the northeast corner of Kern county, in the Sierra Nevada. Its bloom period is April and May.

== Description ==
Astragalus ertterae is hairy perennial herb with a stem no more than 10 centimeters long, much of which grows underground. There are 4 or 5 leaves which are a few centimeters long and made up of several oval-shaped leaflets. The dense inflorescence holds up to 17 cream-colored flowers, each about a centimeter long. The fruit is a swollen, hairless legume pod which dries to a leathery texture.

It is closely morphologically related to Astragalus bicristatus.
