= Owens Peak Wilderness =

Protected wilderness area in California, United States

- IUCN category Ib (wilderness area)
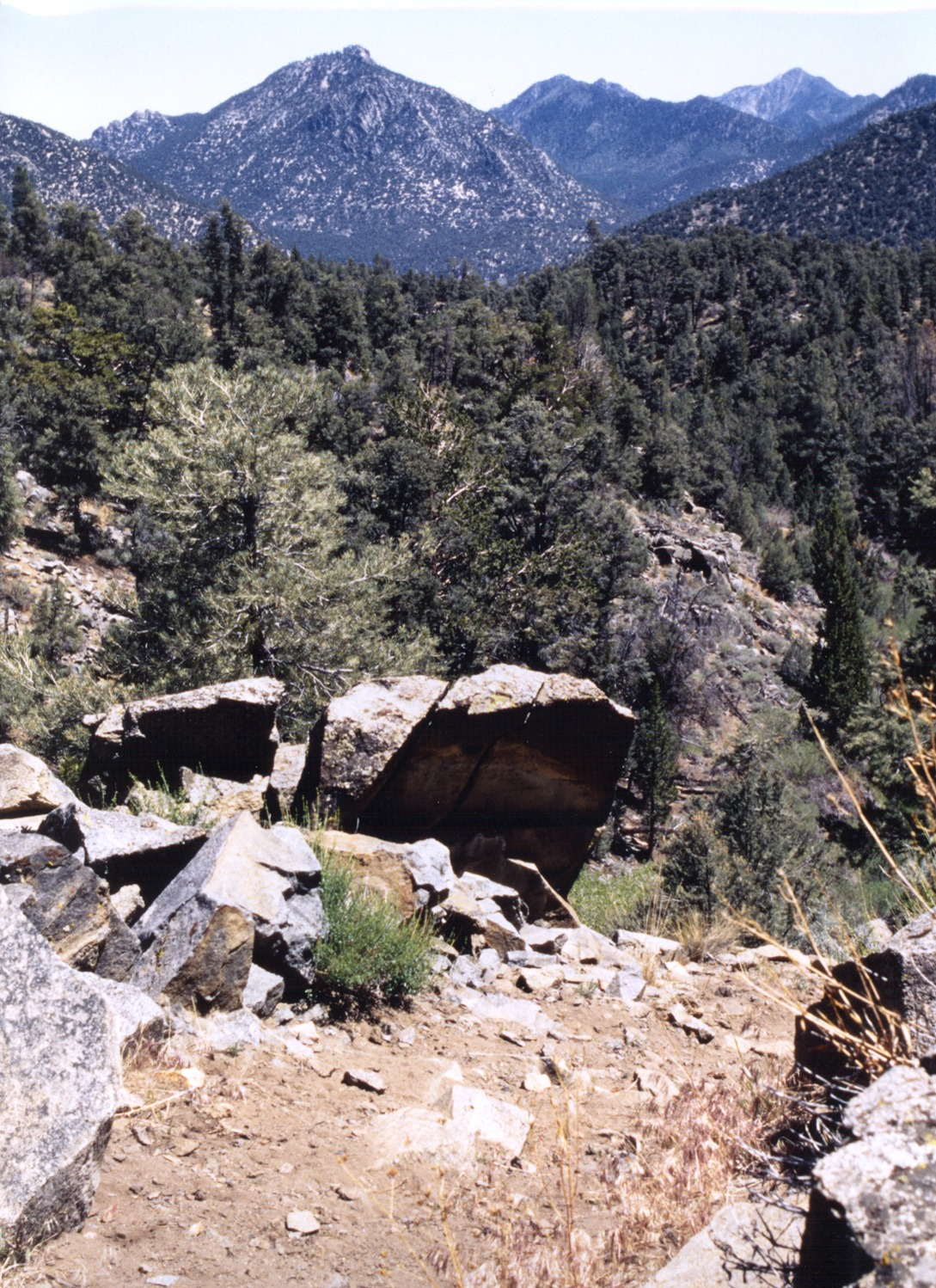
- Owens Peak

- Location within southern California Location within California Location within the United States
- Interactive map of Owens Peak Wilderness
- Location: Kern / Inyo / Tulare counties, California, United States
- Nearest city: Ridgecrest, CA
- Coordinates: 35°43′01″N 117°58′04″W
- Area: 73,767 acres (298.52 km^{2})
- Established: 1994
- Governing body: U.S. Bureau of Land Management

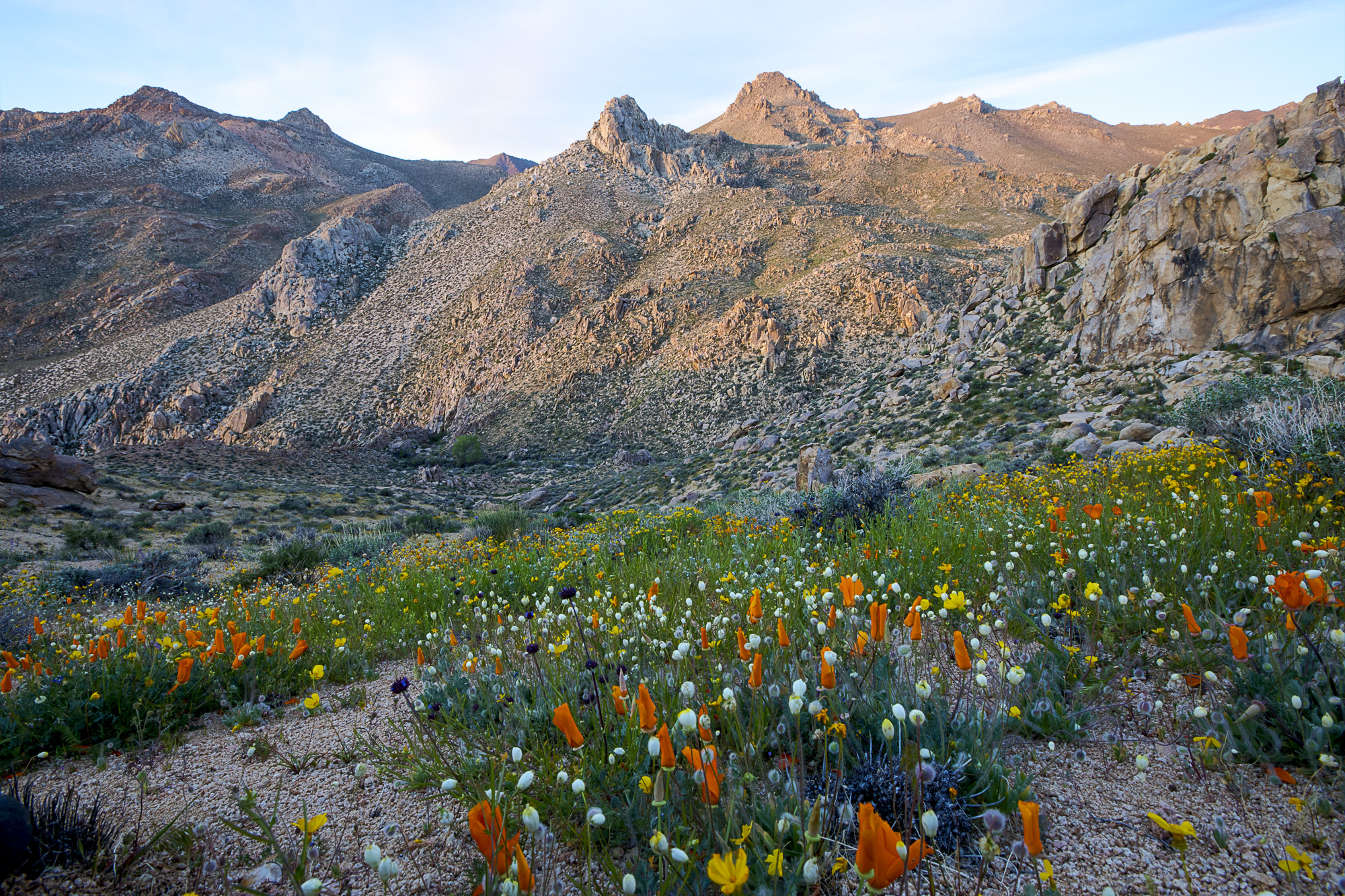
Owens Peak Wilderness wildflowers, 2017

The Owens Peak Wilderness is a 73,767-acre (298.52 km^{2}) wilderness area comprising the rugged eastern face of the Sierra Nevada. Owens Peak (8,445 ft) is the high point. The land was set aside with the passage of the California Desert Protection Act of 1994 (Public Law 103–433) by the US Congress.

The mountainous terrain has deep, winding, open and expansive canyons, many of which contain springs with extensive riparian vegetation. This area is a transition zone between the Great Basin, Mojave Desert and Sierra Nevada ecoregions. Vegetation varies considerably with a creosote desert scrub community on the bajadas, scattered yuccas, cacti, annuals, cottonwood and oak trees in the canyons and valleys and a juniper-pinyon woodland with sagebrush and digger/gray pine on the upper elevations.

Wildlife includes mule deer, golden eagle and prairie falcon. Evidence of occupation by prehistoric peoples has been found throughout the wilderness.

The Pacific Crest Trail passes through the wilderness along the crest and western side.

== Area restoration ==
Starting in 1992, an ongoing effort to restore the environment in both the Kiavah and Owens Peak wilderness areas is being conducted by the University of California, Davis, Student Conservation Corps. By March 1997, 15 miles (24 km) of closed roads had been restored by relieving soil compaction with hand tools or a dozer-drawn ripper, installing waterbars, placing vertical mulch (woody debris and rocks) and scarifying disturbed area surfaces to increase water absorption and seed collection. Despite continued monitoring, illegal off-highway vehicle (OHV) use is a problem in some areas.

== Mountain peaks ==
- Backus Peak
- Five Fingers (Aquila)
- Mount Jenkins
- Morris Peak
- Owens Peak
- Russell Peak
