= Lower Sagehen Creek Hiking Trail =

Hiking trail in California, United States

The Lower Sagehen Creek Hiking Trail follows Sagehen Creek, a tributary of the Truckee River on the east slope of the central Sierra Nevada in the western United States. The stream lies north of Lake Tahoe and the town of Truckee, California, and near the California/Nevada border.

The headwaters and upper watershed of the creek west of California State Route 89 comprise the 9,000-acre (3,600 ha) Sagehen Experimental Forest and Sagehen Creek Field Station, a research and education facility of the University of California, Berkeley.

Below (east of) Highway 89, the Lower Sagehen Creek Hiking Trail follows the creek to its terminus at Stampede Reservoir.

== Wildflowers ==
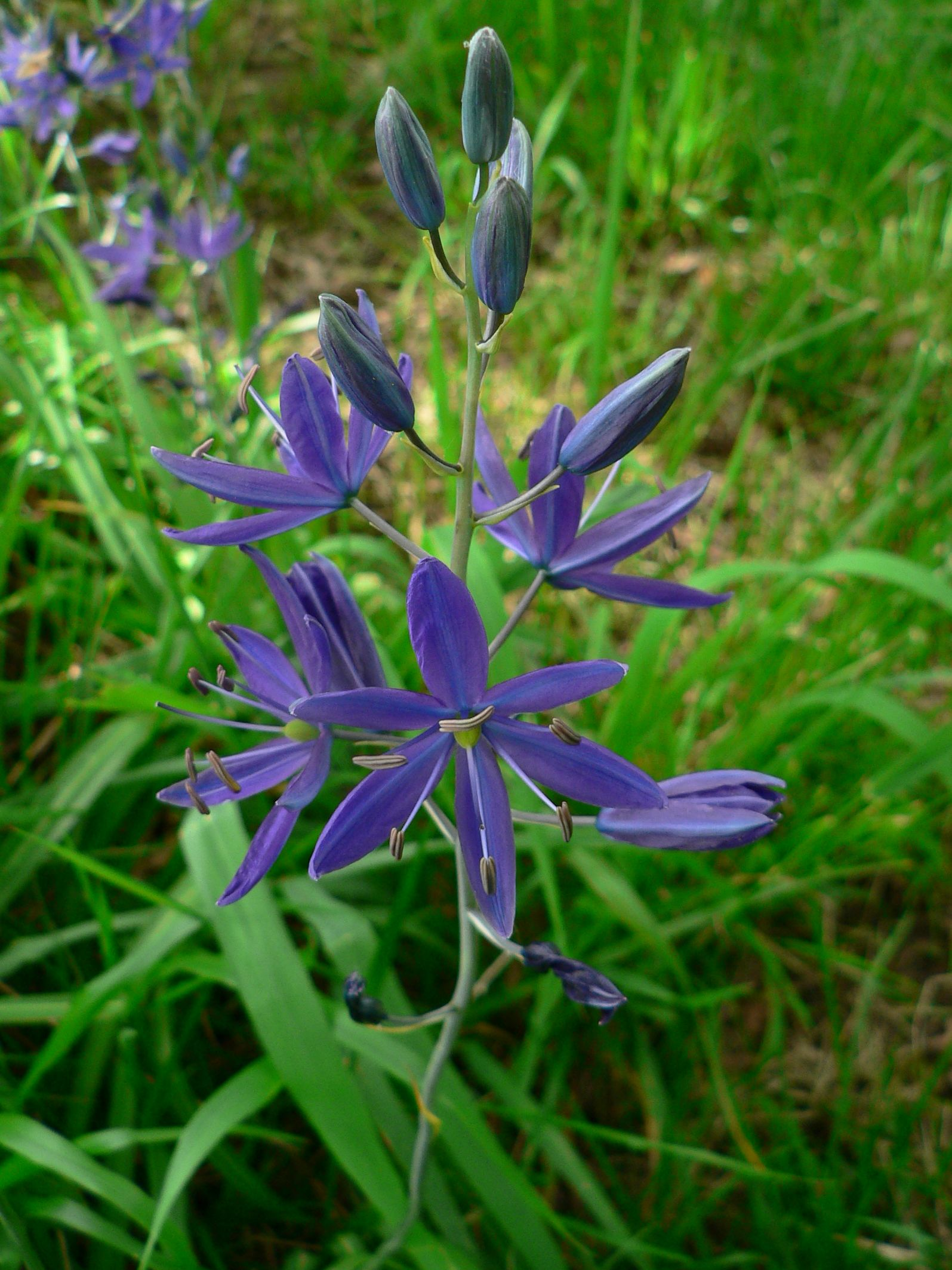
The beautiful Camas Lily grows thick in the Sagehen meadows.

The trail is famous for wildflowers, especially in late May to early June, when fields of camas lilies bloom en masse, creating the illusion of a purple haze lying on the meadow. But the lilies are not the only attraction, with a wide variety of blossoms appearing in both shaded and sunny habitats along the way. Mule's ears, buttercups, purshia, bistort, various penstemons, mahala mat, and shooting stars are common.

== Hiking the trail ==
The hike is relatively flat and easy, running about 2.5 miles (4.0 km) to the lake through shady forest and open meadows. It is typically done as an out-and-back, though it is possible to combine the trail with others in the area for a longer outing. In early season, the area can be marshy and wet, requiring appropriate footwear and mosquito protection.

== Access ==
The trailhead lies at 39.4341°N 120.2047°W, outside of Truckee, roughly 7.2 miles (11.6 km) north of Interstate 80 on California Highway 89. There is no signage, but there is an obvious pullout parking spot for 8-10 cars on the east (downstream) side of the road where the creek crosses beneath the highway. There are no trash or restroom facilities at the trailhead, but visitors can use the Donner Picnic Area a few miles south of the trailhead on Highway 89.

== Monitoring ==
Sagehen Creek Field Station encourages hikers to use the iNaturalist app to submit their observations of plants and animals photographed in the area. These observations are used in research and monitoring efforts in the basin to track presence/absence of species and their locations.
