= Jawbone–Butterbredt Area of Critical Environmental Concern =

Protected area in California, United States

Coordinates: 35.452°N 118.07°W

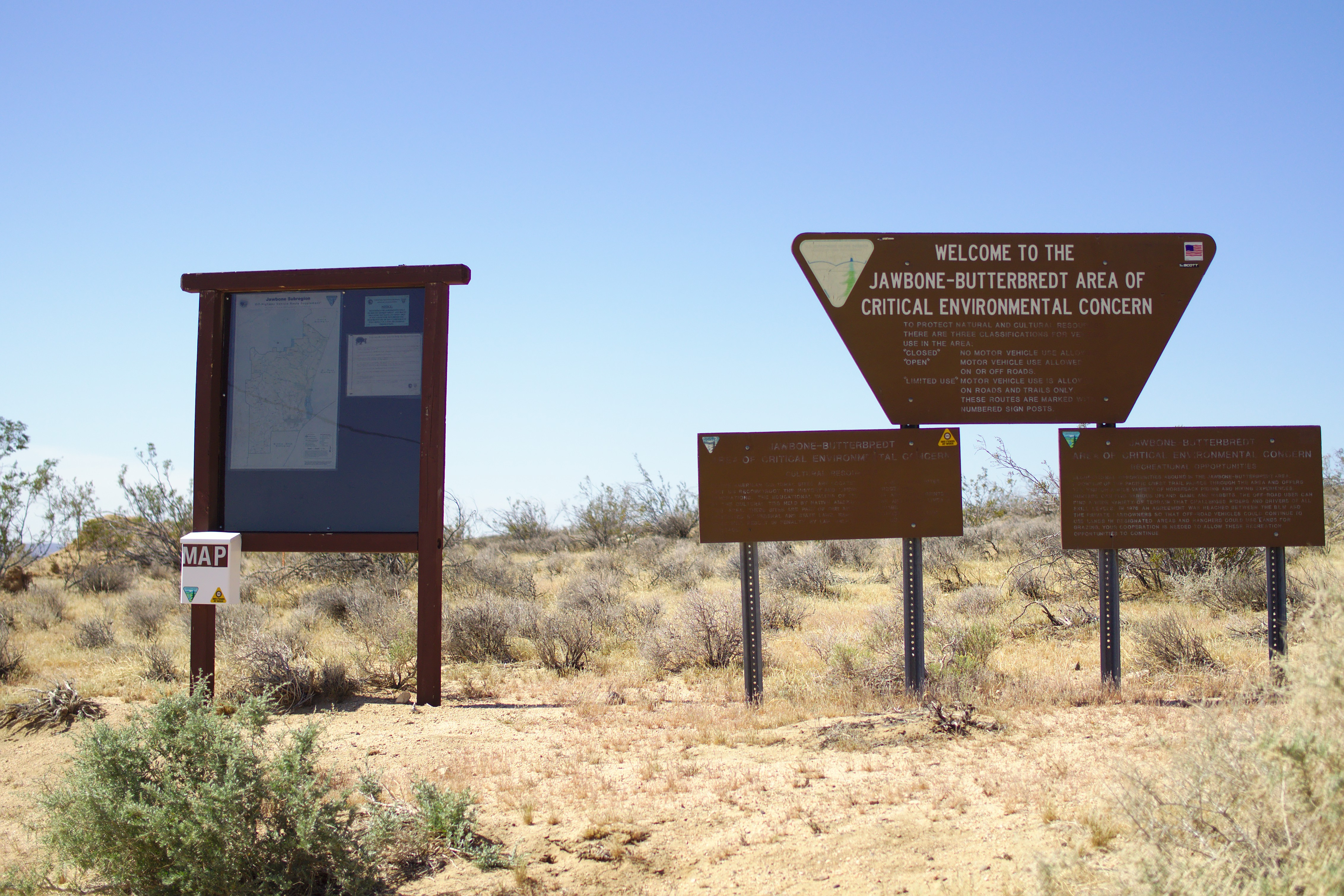
Signage south of California State Route 178

The Jawbone–Butterbredt Area of Critical Environmental Concern (ACEC), is located in the Mojave Desert and Southern Sierra Nevada, northwest of California City and California State Route 14, in Kern County, California.

An Area of Critical Environmental Concern ACEC is a geographical area within lands administered by the Bureau of Land Management that require special measure to protect sensitive resources such as scenic, cultural or wildlife resource values. Motor vehicle use within the ACEC is restricted to specific trails and roads.

The area includes the Jawbone OHV Open Area and lies just south of the Scodie Mountains and Kiavah Wilderness Area.

== Butterbredt Springs ==
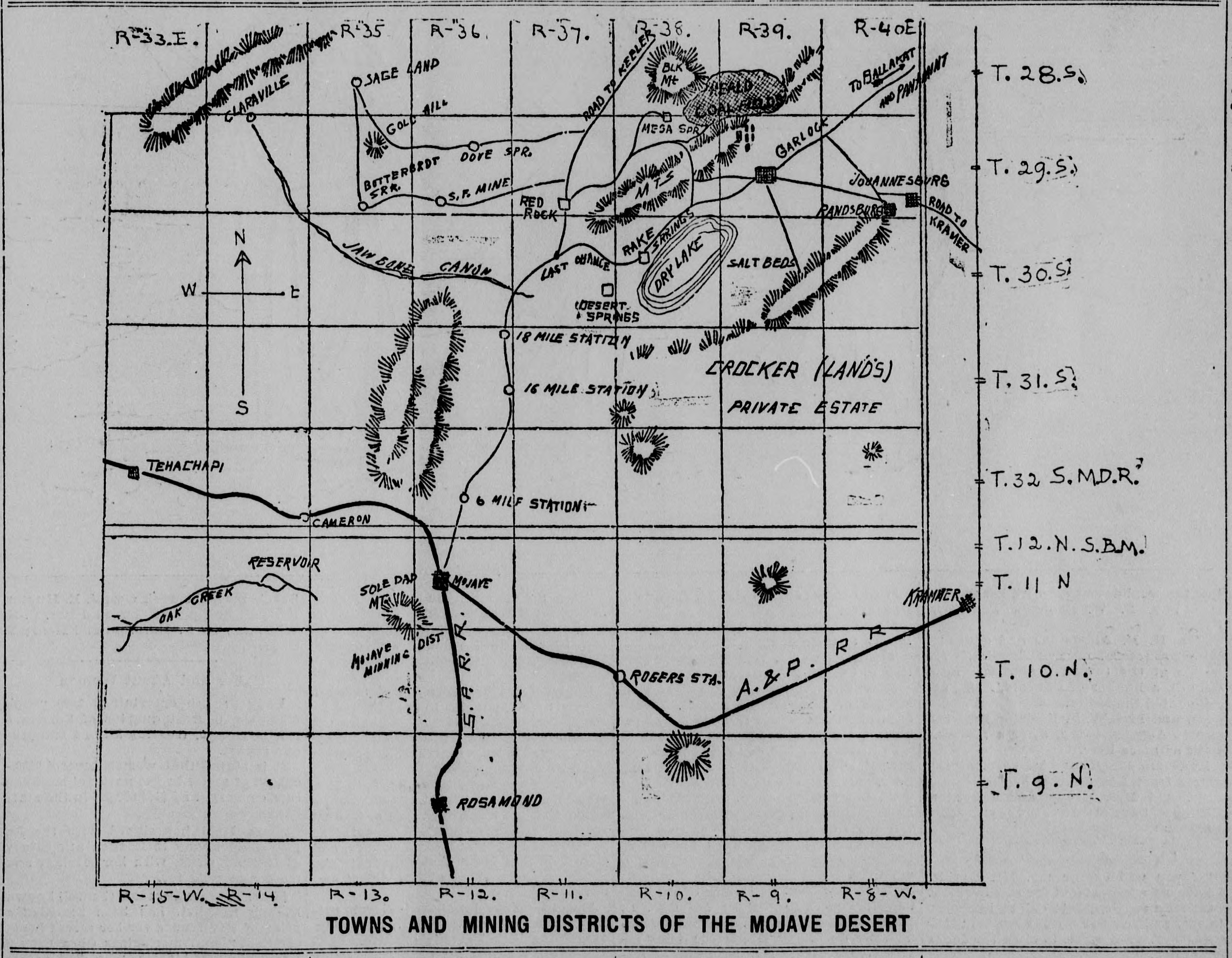
"Towns and Mining Districts of the Mojave Desert" (Los Angeles Herald, Sept. 5, 1897)

Butterbredt Springs is a seep and small oasis in Jawbone Canyon in Kern County, California, in the United States, that is recognized as an important waystation for migrating birds along the Pacific Flyway. Located west of Red Rock Canyon State Park in the Mojave Desert, the nearest human settlement is California City. The oasis, which is surrounded by willows and cottonwoods, but fenced off to protect the water, is managed by the Santa Monica Bay Audubon Society. Late April, May, and early June, first thing in the morning, are usually the best times to observe migrants. Butterbredt Springs and Bear Divide in the San Gabriel Mountains of Los Angeles County are the only two known sites in California where migrating birds fly during the day, instead of just at night, as is typical. The springs are also said to be a "magnet for vagrants," meaning birds flying way out of their usual range, who may be a bit lost, as birds go.

Located near the LADWP Pine Tree wind farm; radar is used to protect migratory birds from turbine dangers. Butterbredt Springs is accessible from California State Route 14.

Butterbredt Springs is named for miner Frederick Butterbredt and his family; Butterbredt's wife was an indigenous woman whose family were killed in an 1863 massacre perpetrated by the U.S. Army on Native Americans who lived near Kernville.

== See also ==
- Kern River Preserve
- Tule Elk State Natural Reserve
- Bright Star Wilderness
- Protected areas of the Mojave Desert
