= Lost Corner Mountain =

Mountain in United States of America

- Location within California Location within the United States

Highest point
- Elevation: 8,265 ft (2,519 m) NAVD 88
- Prominence: 541 ft (165 m)
- Coordinates: 39°00′49″N 120°12′15″W

Geography
- Location: El Dorado County, California, U.S.
- Parent range: Sierra Nevada
- Topo map: USGS Homewood

Climbing
- Easiest route: Hike and scramble, class 1-2

Lost Corner Mountain is a mountain summit in the Sierra Nevada mountain range to the west of Lake Tahoe on the border of the Desolation Wilderness in El Dorado County, California. The city closest to it is Meyers, California which is 4.4 miles away.

The Pacific Crest Trail skirts the mountain on its west flank.
