= Sacatar Trail Wilderness =

Protected wilderness area in California, United States

- IUCN category Ib (wilderness area)
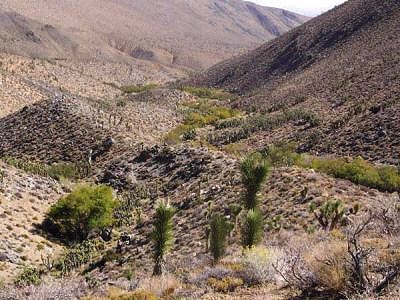

- Location within California Location within the United States
- Interactive map of Sacatar Trail Wilderness
- Location: Inyo County / Tulare County, California
- Nearest city: Ridgecrest, California
- Coordinates: 35°57′20″N 117°59′41″W
- Area: 51,900 acres (210 km^{2})
- Established: Oct.31, 1994
- Governing body: Bureau of Land Management

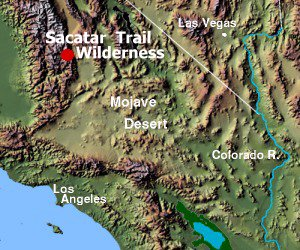
Sacatar Trail Wilderness location in the southern Sierras

The Sacatar Trail Wilderness is a federally designated wilderness area located 20 miles (32 km) northwest of Ridgecrest, California USA. It was created in 1994 with the passage of the California Desert Protection Act - Public Law 103-433 - and is managed by the Bureau of Land Management (BLM). The wilderness is 51,900 acres (210 km^{2}) in size and protects portions of the southern Sierra Nevada Mountain Range.

== History ==
The Sacatar Trail was the only route into the Owens Valley from the west before the road over Walker Pass was built. Cattle, soldiers, and commercial traffic used this trail. It is the only designated hiking trail within the wilderness and is about nine miles (14 km) in length.

== Landscape ==
Elevations in the wilderness are from 3,541 to 8,800 feet (1,079 to 2,682 m).

The wilderness contains an "ecotone" formed by the convergence of desert and Sierran vegetative communities and encompasses a narrow band along the southern Sierra crest between Nine Mile Canyon in the south and Sequoia National Forest to the north. The boundary includes the desert-like eastern face of the Sierra Nevada Range where broad alluvial fans or bajadas collect from Rose Valley. Height from Rose Valley up to the granite crest is as much as a mile. Five steep canyons cut through the east side with several perennial springs.

== Flora and fauna ==
The perennial springs support riparian growth of Fremont cottonwood trees, willows and grasses. The higher elevations have single-leaf pinyon pine and Jeffrey Pine trees. Higher elevations have isolated stands of ponderosa pine and red fir. Within the area is one known population of Phacelia novermillensis, also known as Nine Mile Canyon phacelia, and is an annual plant native to California and is toxic, causing dermatitis.

== Recreation and access ==
Recreation activities are day-hiking, backpacking and pinyon nut gathering. A California campfire permit is required for open fires or backpack stoves.

The trail crosses the wilderness from east to west, with the east side a steep and strenuous climb. Starting at the west trailhead and traveling east is recommended.

The eastside trailhead is difficult to find because of minimal signage. A topographic map (Little Lake quad) or the BLM map of the area is helpful. The Bureau of Land Management encourages the practice of Leave No Trace principles of outdoor travel to minimize human impact on the environment.

== See also ==
- Chimney Peak Wilderness — adjacent
