= Bright Star Wilderness =

Protected wilderness area in California, United States

- IUCN category Ib (wilderness area)

- Location within the United States
- Location: Kern County, California, United States
- Nearest city: Lake Isabella, California
- Coordinates: 35.5063454°N 118.2428549°W
- Area: 8,190 acres (3,314 ha)
- Established: October 31, 1994
- Governing body: Bureau of Land Management

Bright Star Wilderness is a 8,190-acre (3,314 ha) wilderness area in Kern County in the U.S. state of California.

The California Desert Protection Act of 1994 (Public Law 103–433) added the wilderness to the National Wilderness Preservation System and it is administered by the Bureau of Land Management (BLM).

Bright Star Wilderness surrounds 5,090-foot (1,551 m) Kern County's Kelso Peak and drainages to the north, south and east, including Bright Star Canyon and Cortez Canyon.

The Wilderness lies within the BLM's Jawbone-Butterbredt Area of Critical Environmental Concern in the higher Mojave Desert and protects much of the Piute Mountains, of the southern Sierra Nevada (not to be confused with the Piute Mountains to east in Mojave National Preserve).

== Vegetation ==
A wide variety of vegetation grows in the Bright Star Wilderness. The upper slopes of Kelso Peak are dotted with Single-leaf piñon pine (Pinus monophylla) and California juniper (Juniperus californica), while the lower slopes are brushy and broken by large granite outcroppings. The valley below the peak is dense with Joshua trees (Yucca brevifolia).

== See also ==
- List of U.S. Wilderness Areas
- Wilderness Act
