= Bucks Lake Wilderness =

Protected wilderness area in California, United States

- IUCN category Ib (wilderness area)
- Location within California Location within the United States
- Interactive map of Bucks Lake Wilderness
- Location: Northeastern California, Sierra Nevada Mountain Range, Plumas County, California, United States
- Nearest city: Quincy, California
- Coordinates: 39°57′15″N 121°10′34″W
- Area: 23,958 acres (96.95 km^{2})
- Established: 1984
- Governing body: U.S. Forest Service

The Bucks Lake Wilderness is a 23,958-acre (97.0 km^{2}) wilderness area located in the Plumas National Forest section of the Sierra Nevada, in northeastern California, United States.

== Geography ==
The wilderness lies in Plumas County south of Lake Almanor. It protects the northernmost end of the Sierra Crest, which beyond the canyon of the North Fork Feather River, is no longer distinct. The California Wilderness Act of 1984 set aside the wilderness. The reservoir for which it is named is considered a "boater's Mecca" and is just outside the wilderness boundary.

== Natural history ==
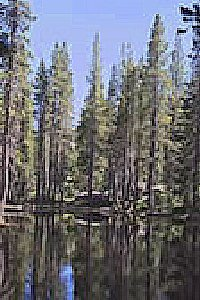
Bucks Lake Wilderness, Plumas National Forest.

The topography is classic Sierra Nevada with gentle slopes on the western side, glacial cirques, and areas of bare granitic rock. The highest point is Mount Pleasant (7,054 ft). Of the 13 cirques in the area, the one-mile (1.6 km)-wide Silver Lake is the largest, located below Spanish Peak of the Sierra crest, just outside the wilderness boundary. The North Fork Feather River canyon forms the north boundary and the wilderness includes its 6-mile (9.7 km)-long canyon wall.

The wilderness provides habitat for the black bear, coyote, mountain lion, mule deer and black-tailed deer as well as eagle, peregrine falcon, owls and the willow flycatcher.

Vegetation includes conifers such as sugar, lodgepole and Jeffrey pine with almost pure stands of red fir on the highest elevations. Streams and wet meadows have alder and aspen trees, corn lilies and montane chaparral.

There are three adjacent units of roadless areas, the largest of which has Bucks Mountain, Bald Eagle Mountain and Bucks Creek.

== Bucks Lake ==
See Bucks Lake for full article.

The dam was begun by the Feather River Power Company, which was owned by R.C. Storrie and Robert Muir. The company bought 1,000 acres (4.0 km^{2}), including the Bucks Ranch and began construction in early 1926. Three years and eight million dollars later, the company had financial problems and ended up selling the project to Great Western Power Company who completed the project in 1928.

The 105,600 acre-feet (130,300,000 m^{3})-capacity reservoir is created by the 122 ft (37 m) high rock-fill dam on Bucks Creek, covers 1,852 acres (7.49 km^{2}) and is operated by the Pacific Gas and Electric Company.

== See also ==
- Feather Headwaters
- Ecology of the Sierra Nevada
- Protected areas of the Sierra Nevada
