= Chimney Peak Wilderness =

Protected wilderness area in California, United States

- IUCN category Ib (wilderness area)
- Location within California Location within the United States
- Interactive map of Chimney Peak Wilderness
- Location: Tulare County, California, United States
- Nearest city: Ridgecrest, California
- Coordinates: 35°50′56″N 118°05′09″W
- Area: 13,134 acres (53.15 km^{2})
- Established: Oct. 31, 1994
- Governing body: Bureau of Land Management

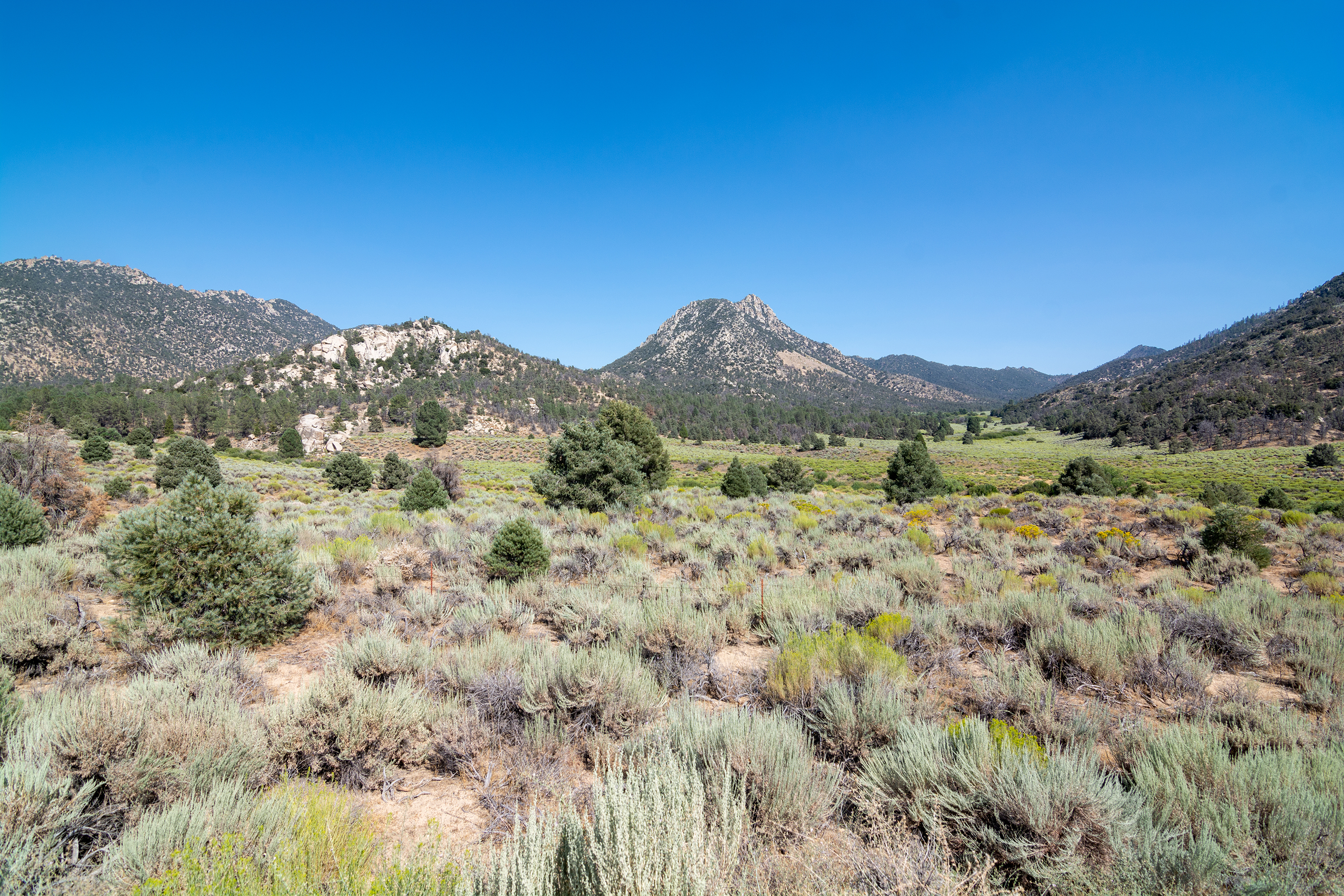
View of Chimney Peak Wilderness, 2019

The Chimney Peak Wilderness is a 13,134-acre (53.15 km^{2}) wilderness area located 20 miles (32 km) northwest of Ridgecrest, in southeastern Tulare County, California.

The 1994 California Desert Protection Act (Public Law 103–433) created the wilderness and it is managed by the Bureau of Land Management (BLM), Department of the Interior.

The Chimney Peak Wilderness is a rugged and mountainous Mojave Desert environment on the eastern side of the Southern Sierra Nevada Range. The wilderness is named for Chimney Peak, elevation 7,871 feet (2,399 m), located in the northeast corner of the wilderness.

The area has Mojave Desert plants such as Joshua tree (Yucca brevifolia) and creosote bush (Larrea tridentata) on the valley floors and alluvial fans and in the Sierra foothills. Higher Sierra elevations have single-leaf pinyon pine (Pinus monophylla).

== Recreation ==
Recreational activities include hiking, horseback riding, fishing and camping/backpacking. No motorized vehicles or mechanical equipment is allowed within a wilderness area. A backcountry byway for vehicles is adjacent to part of it.

The Pacific Crest Trail passes through the wilderness area.

A portion of the Sacatar Trail, an old wagon road into the Owens Valley once used by soldiers and cattlemen, cross the Chimney Peak Wilderness, .

Chimney Peak Backcountry Byway

The BLM began a "byway" program in 1989 which is a tour by automobile through or near scenic public lands. This program designates "backcountry byways" along secondary roads. The Chimney Peak Backcountry Byway can be accessed from State Route 178, is over 38 miles (61 km) in length and travels through Lamont Meadow, circles around Chimney Peak, and returns to Canebrake Road at Lamont Meadow.

== See also ==
- Sacatar Trail Wilderness — adjacent.
