= Kiavah Wilderness =

Protected wilderness area in California, United States

- IUCN category Ib (wilderness area)
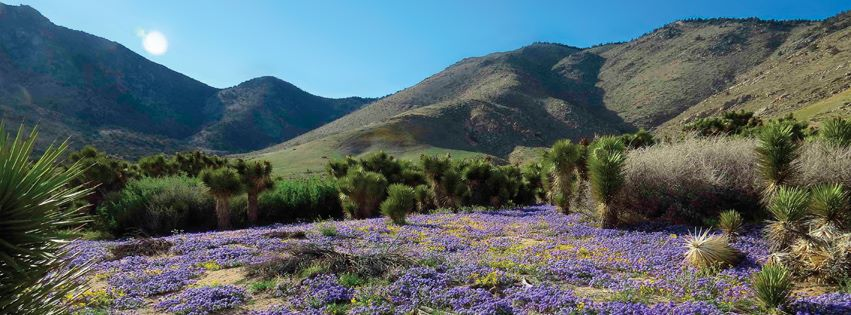
- Spring flowers in the Klavah Wilderness

- Location within southern California Location within California Location within the United States
- Interactive map of Kiavah Wilderness
- Location: Kern County, California
- Nearest city: Ridgecrest, California
- Coordinates: 35°37′20″N 118°06′46″W
- Area: 88,290 acres (357.3 km^{2})
- Established: 1994
- Governing body: U.S. Forest Service, Bureau of Land Management

The Kiavah Wilderness is a federally designated wilderness area located in the Mojave Desert, Scodie Mountains, and southern Sierra Nevada in Kern County, California, United States. California State Route 178 connects the town of Lake Isabella to State Highway 14 in the east, crossing Walker Pass at the north boundary of the wilderness.

The Kiavah Wilderness was created in 1994 with the enactment of the California Desert Protection Act (Public Law 103–433), is jointly managed by the U.S. Forest Service and the Bureau of Land Management (BLM), and is mostly within the Sequoia National Forest. This wilderness is part of the National Cooperative Land and Wildlife Management Area and the BLM's Jawbone–Butterbredt Area of Critical Environmental Concern, which was designated to protect critical wildlife and Native American values.

== Geography ==
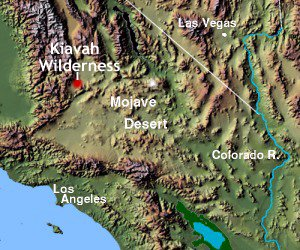

It is located west of Inyokern and 50 miles (80 km) northeast of Bakersfield. There are 88,290 acres (357.3 km^{2}) of wilderness and 702 acres (2.84 km^{2}) of partially roaded nonwilderness.

Located on a broad plateau rising immediately south of Walker Pass in the southern Sierra Nevada, are the Scodie Mountains. The highest peaks are Skinner Peak (7,073 ft) in the south and Pinyon Peak (6,768 ft) in the north. Many canyons cut through the flanks of the plateau except in the north, which has an abrupt 3,000-foot (910 m) escarpment.

Three seasonal springs flow from the slope of the plateau: Yellowjacket, McIvers and Willow Springs. Other springs flow from the canyon folds.

== Flora and fauna ==
=== Flora ===
The wilderness encompasses the eroded hills, canyons and alluvial fans-bajadas of the Scodie Mountains Unit within the Sequoia National Forest—the southern extremity of the Sierra Nevada. A unique mixing of several different species of plants and animals occurs within the transition zone between the Mojave Desert and Sierra Nevada.

The Kiavah Wilderness is one of only two protected areas that support a significant woodland of pinyon-juniper in California. Other plant life include Mormon tea, sagebrush, creosote, burrobush and shadscale, pinyon pine, juniper, canyon oak, grey pine and Joshua trees. Spring wildflower displays are from April to June.

A rare and endemic wildflower, the Walker Pass milkvetch (Astragalus ertterae) of the pea family, grows within the Pinyon-Juniper woodland. It grows in the sandy-loamy to granitic soils associated with pinyon pines and canyon live oaks. It is primarily found on west-facing slopes from 5,600 to 6,200 feet (1,700 to 1,900 m) elevation. The Walker Pass milkvetch was first described in 1987 from a collection made in 1982 along a newly constructed section of the Pacific Crest Trail. There are fewer than 10 populations of this perennial herb, all of which are located in Kern County. Very little information is known about this plant, nor is it listed under state or federal endangered species laws. "If this plant truly is as rare as presently believed, it is crucial that all existing populations be protected." said M. Elvin of the Bureau of Land Management.

=== Fauna ===
The semiarid conditions with few reliable water sources restrict wildlife habitat. The U.S. Forest Service has installed water guzzlers and springs to increase water supply for the small number of mule deer as well as mountain quail and California quail (or Valley quail). The rough-legged hawk, yellow-headed blackbird, gray-crowned rosy finch, and sage sparrow have also been seen here.

== Recreation ==
Activities in the wilderness include day-hiking, backpacking, pinyon nut gathering, and nature photography.

Most of the recreation is concentrated along forest road 27S11 in the southeast where off-highway vehicles are frequent. McIver's Cabin is a popular destination.

The Pacific Crest Trail travels the length of the wilderness for 17 miles (27 km).

The other major trail is the Cholla Canyon Trail with a length of over 4 miles (6 km) and passes three seasonal springs en route.

== See also ==
- Flora of the California desert regions
- Natural history of the Mojave Desert
- Protected areas of the Mojave Desert
- List of wilderness areas in California
- Environmental ethics
