= Scodie Mountains =

- Location within California

Highest point
- Elevation: 2,158 m (7,080 ft)

Geography
- Country: United States
- State: California
- District: Kern County
- Range coordinates: 35°37′47.833″N 118°4′55.267″W
- Topo map: USGS Walker Pass

The Scodie Mountains are a sub-mountain range of the Southern Sierra Nevada rising from the Mojave Desert, and located in Kern County, California.

== Geography ==
The range lies in an east–west direction directly west of the desert town of Ridgecrest, and southeast of the Kern River Valley and Lake Isabella. The mountain range reaches an elevation of 7,096 feet (2,163 m) above sea level at Cathie's Peak.

The range was named by the U.S. Forest Service for William Scodie, who established "Scodie's Store" (ca.1860) at the mouth of what is now named Scodie Canyon.

=== Kiavah Wilderness ===
The Scodie Mountains are home to the Kiavah Wilderness Area, managed by the Bureau of Land Management.

== Natural history ==
The Scodie Mountains are an ecotone of Mojave Desert and Sierra Nevada flora, with plant communities differentiated by elevation.

They lie to the north of the Jawbone-Butterbredt Area of Critical Environmental Concern.

== See also ==
- Robbers Roost (Kern County, California) — NRHP site in the Scodie Mountains.
- Mountain ranges of the Mojave Desert
- Mountain ranges of the Sierra Nevada (United States)
- Natural history of the Mojave Desert
