= Richard Jencks =

American lawyer

Richard W. Jencks
- Born: 1921; Oakland, California
- Died: June 30, 2014 (age 93); Mill Valley, California
- Occupations: attorney; television executive

Richard William Jencks (1921 – June 30, 2014) was an American television executive, lawyer, former president of the CBS Broadcast Group, and former member of CBS' board of directors. He retired from his position as Corporate Vice President of CBS in 1976. Jencks was also a former president of the Alliance of Television and Film Producers, or ATFP, which is now called the Alliance of Motion Picture and Television Producers.

== Early life and education ==
Jencks, a fourth generation Californian, was born in Oakland, California, in 1921. As a child, he vacationed during the summer at Fallen Leaf Lake near Lake Tahoe, where his family had opened a resort (present-day Stanford Sierra Camp). He initially enrolled at the University of California, Berkeley, but left to join the U.S. military during World War II. He served as a commanding officer for several harbor defense vessels, which placed anti-submarine nets and torpedo net throughout the Aleutian Islands and the Caribbean Sea during the war. He enrolled at Stanford University after the war, where he earned both his bachelor's degree (1946) and his law degree (1948).

== Career ==
Following law school, Jencks joined the National Association of Broadcasters (NAB) in Washington, D.C. as an associate general counsel. He then moved to Los Angeles, where he became West Coast Resident Attorney for CBS, Inc. He later left CBS to become president of the Alliance of Television and Film Producers.

While working in Los Angeles, Jencks became the first president of the West Pasadena Residents' Association (WPRA), serving in 1962–1963. He also served on the Pasadena City Council.

Jencks returned to CBS as the television network's general counsel and was later named president of the CBS Broadcast Group, which included CBS News, CBS Television Network, CBS Radio Network, Cinema Center Films, and the television and radio stations owned by CBS. When CBS became the target of accusations of excessive depictions of sex and violence by the Nixon administration during the early 1970s, Jencks, who was a CBS corporate vice president at the time, flew to Washington to defend the broadcast network against the allegations. He remained in Washington, D.C. until his retirement in 1976.

Jencks was appointed a distinguished visiting professor of communications at San Diego State University and was a founding member of the board of directors for the University of California at Berkeley Foundation. He served as well on the editorial board for the Marin Independent Journal. Jencks began appearing on a weekly radio opinion show called "2 Minutes with Richard" on KSCO when he was 85 years old and was frequently in demand as a speaker on broadcasting and other communication subjects.

== Personal life ==
He and his wife, Mary, resided in Stinson Beach, California, for fifteen years before moving to nearby Mill Valley, California. Jencks died on June 30, 2014, at the age of 93. He was survived by his wife; two children, Michael Reynolds Jencks and Nancy de Laguna Jencks and four step-children - Lynn Christopher Collins, Martha M. Barrett, Elizabeth B. Snyder, and George B. Barrett III.

== Works ==
- Remarks to the National Association of Farm Directors, November 24, 1967 (regarding tobacco advertising and the Fairness Doctrine)
- Sumner Redstone, William S. Paley, and Other Diversions: Media moguls, then and now A Talk for the CBS Alumni Club, New York City, January 15, 2002
- "Richard W. Jencks: Internet's entertainment threat", Marin Independent Journal, July 20, 2006
- "Why Capitol Hill Needs a Churchill Reminder", The Wall Street Journal, May 10, 2013
