= Angora Lakes =

Two small lakes in California, United States

Upper Angora Lake
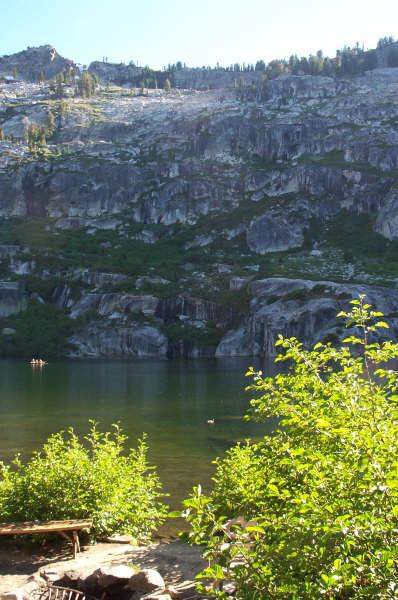

- Location within California Location within the United States
- Location: El Dorado County, California
- Coordinates: 38°51′51″N 120°04′00″W
- Type: glacial tarn
- Basin countries: United States
- Max. length: 0.5 mi (0.80 km)
- Max. width: 0.5 mi (0.80 km)
- Shore length^{1}: 1 mi (1.6 km)
- Surface elevation: 7,450 ft (2,270 m)
- Settlements: Meyers, California; South Lake Tahoe, California; Stateline, Nevada
- ^{1} Shore length is not a well-defined measure.

The Angora Lakes are two small freshwater lakes in the Sierra Nevada and Lake Tahoe Watershed ~1,200 ft (370 m) in elevation above Fallen Leaf Lake and Lake Tahoe. It is the location of the Angora Lakes Resort. The lakes were named for a herd of Angora goats that used to graze in the area.

== Angora Fire of 2007 ==
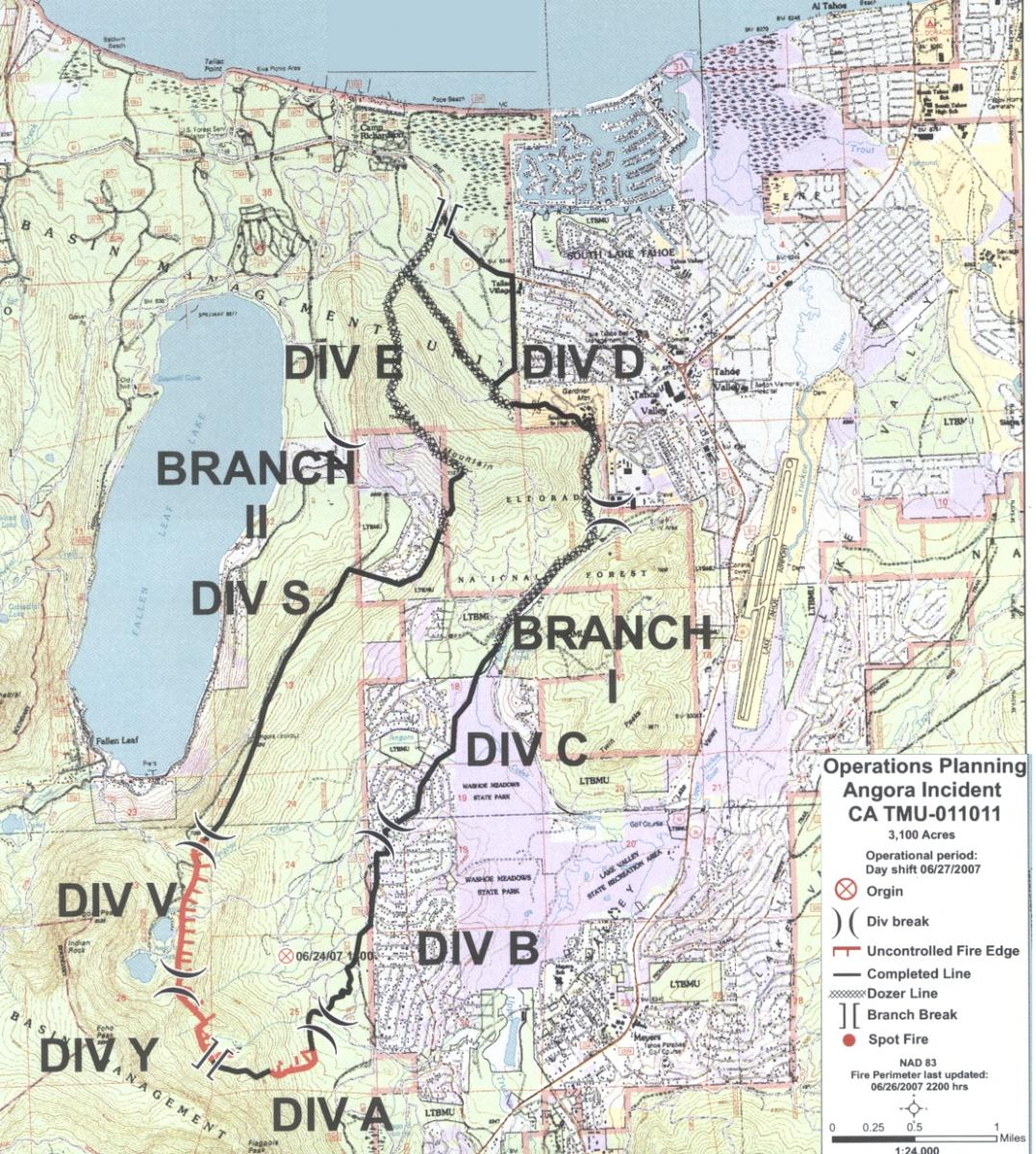
Angora Fire of 2007 Perimeter map, Lake Tahoe Basin Management Unit

The so-called "Angora Fire" started around 1:00 pm on Sunday, June 24, 2007, at the southern end of remote heavily forested land below Angora Ridge Road and extended from Meyers and Fallen Leaf Lake on the south and west to Camp Richardson near Lake Tahoe's southern shore. Strong winds caused the fire to quickly spread uncontrolled through steep terrain. Most of the devastation to homes was near N. Upper Truckee Rd. where the fire destroyed 254 homes, damaged 26 homes, numerous other structures valued at $141 million and prompted 3,000 evacuations, making it among the half dozen or so most destructive fires in U.S. history. No commercial structures were involved. For $15 million, 2,100 firefighters, 145 engines, and 9 air tankers battled the blaze, which consumed 3,100 acres (12.5 square kilometers) and filled the entire Tahoe basin with dense smoke for several days. High winds initially spread the fire and caused most of the property losses, but much calmer conditions on the ensuing three days allowed firefighters to contain it 70% with firebreak lines around it.

No thunderstorms were in the area at the time, and it is assumed that the fire was human-caused.

The ash from the fire that falls in Lake Tahoe is considered to be a problem for the clarity of Lake Tahoe, and Governor Schwarzenegger of California pledged to spend the necessary funds to restore the land values adequately to prevent erosion from depositing the ash on the ground into the lake and further damaging it.

== Nearby peaks and mountains ==
- Echo Peak 8,895 ft (2,711.2 m)
- Angora Peak 8,588 ft (2,617.6 m)
- Mount Tallac 9,735 ft (2,967 m)
- Ralston Peak 9,235 ft (2,814.8 m)
- Pyramid Peak 9,985 ft (3,043.4 m)

== See also ==
- Emerald Bay State Park
- List of lakes in California
