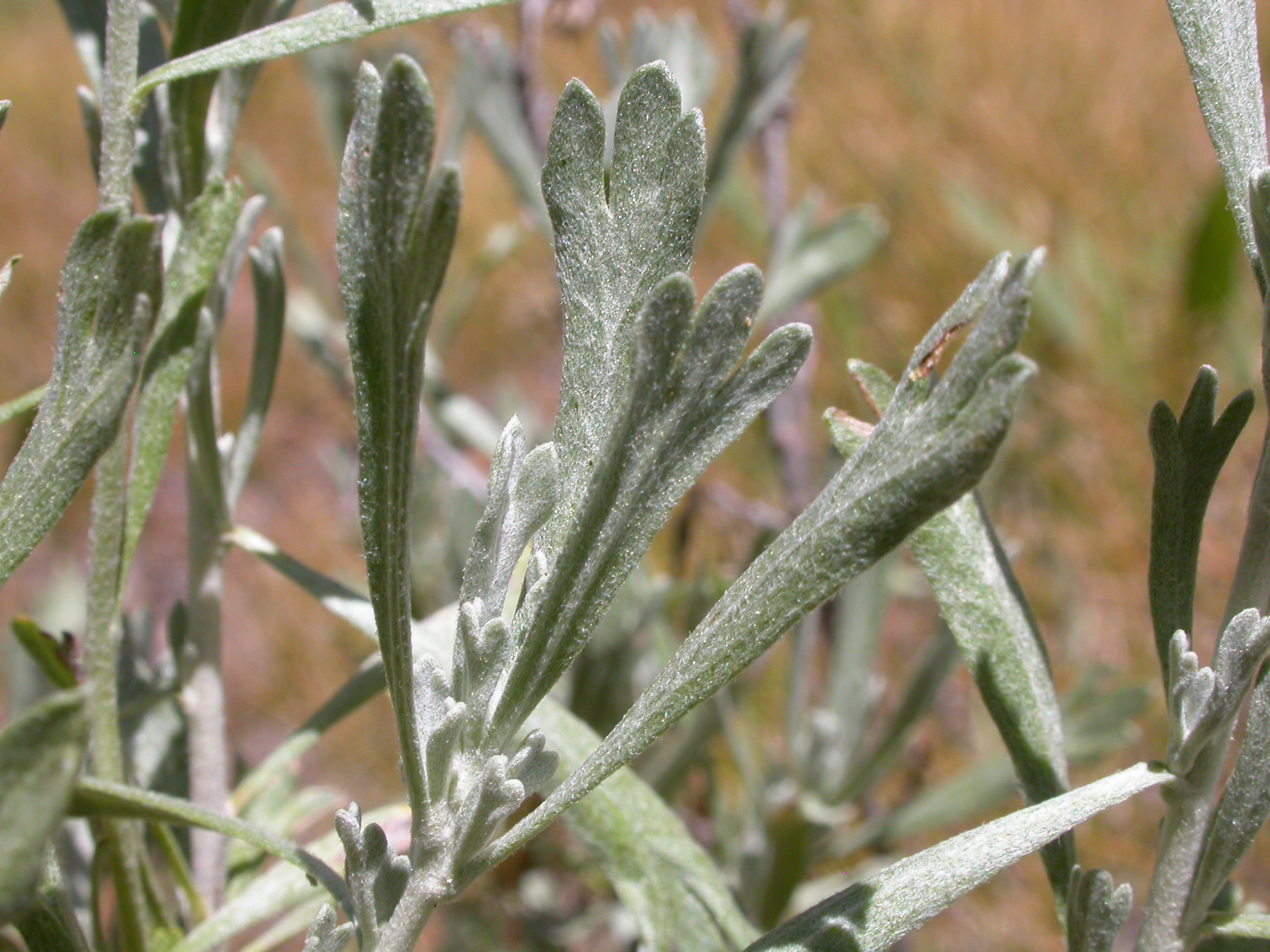

Conservation status
- Apparently Secure (NatureServe)

Scientific classification
- Kingdom: Plantae
- Clade: Tracheophytes
- Clade: Angiosperms
- Clade: Eudicots
- Clade: Asterids
- Order: Asterales
- Family: Asteraceae
- Genus: Artemisia
- Species: A. rothrockii

Binomial name
- Artemisia rothrockii A.Gray

Synonyms
- Artemisia tridentata var. rothrockii (A.Gray) McMinn; Artemisia tridentata subsp. rothrockii (A.Gray) H.M.Hall & Clem.; Seriphidium rothrockii (A.Gray) W.A.Weber

= Artemisia rothrockii =

Species of flowering plant

Artemisia rothrockii is a North American species of sagebrush known by the common names timberline sagebrush and Rothrock's sagebrush.

Artemisia rothrockii is endemic to California, where it is native to parts of the Sierra Nevada, the White Mountains, and the San Bernardino Mountains. It has been recorded from the Kern Plateau, Mount Dana, Angora Peak, and the vicinity of Fallen Leaf Lake. It grows in the dry transition between mountain meadows and forests. It can also tolerate wet conditions, surviving waterlogging during snowmelt.

Artemisia rothrockii grows at elevations between 2000 and 3500 meters. This mountain shrub grows to heights of 20 to 50 centimeters, producing many upright stems from a narrow trunk. The evergreen foliage is dark green, glandular, sticky, and very aromatic. New twigs and leaves are somewhat woolly, but older parts are hairless. The narrow inflorescence holds clusters of flower heads lined with rough, shiny, slightly hairy phyllaries and containing yellowish disc florets. The fruit is an achene up to 2 millimeters long, sometimes with a pappus.

The species is named for American forester Joseph Trimbel Rothrock, 1839 – 1922.
