= Clifford Nass =

American academic (1958–2013)

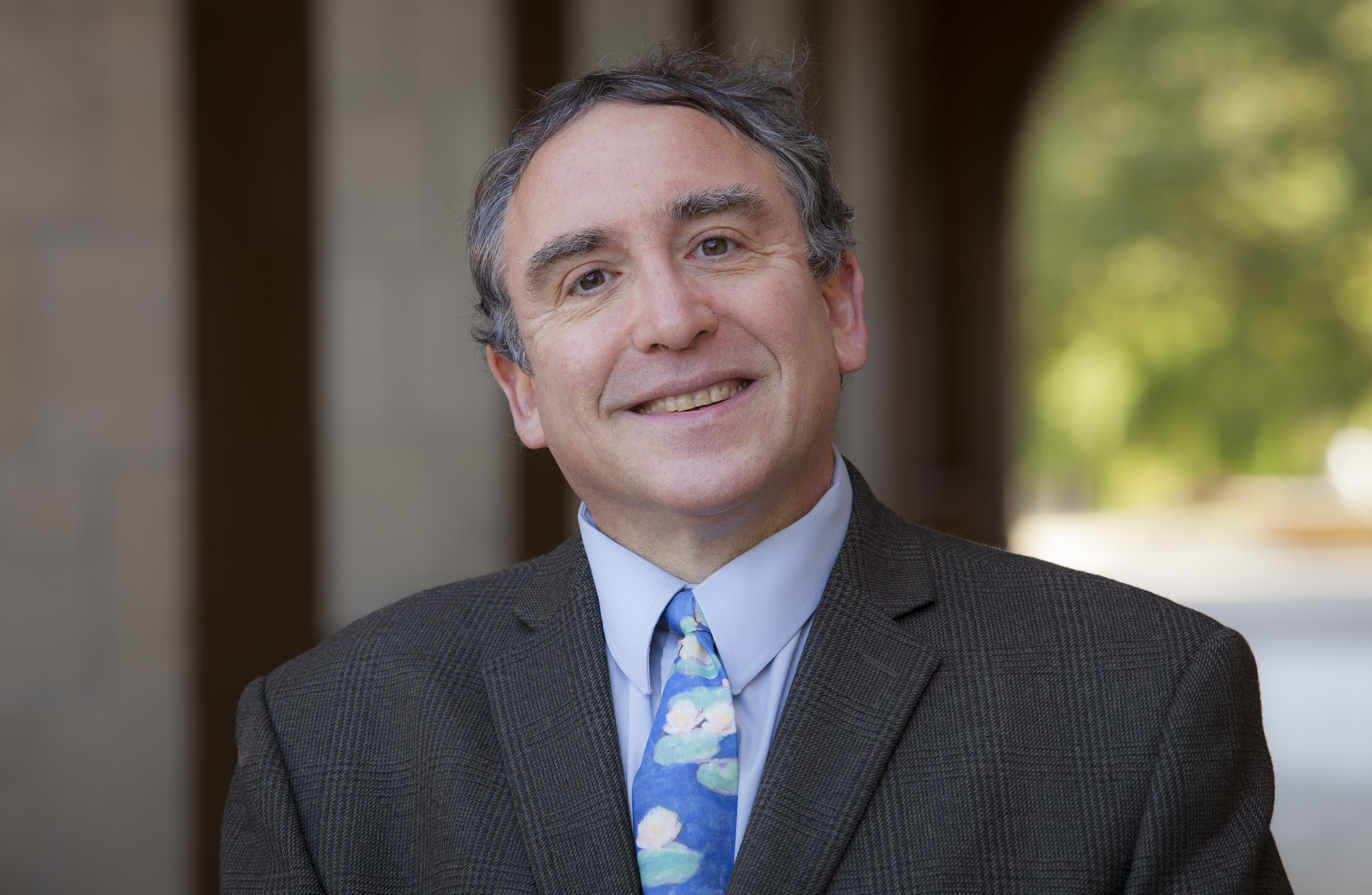
- Nass at Stanford in 2013
- Born: April 3, 1958; Teaneck, New Jersey, U.S.
- Died: November 2, 2013 (aged 55); Stanford Sierra Camp, Fallen Leaf Lake, California, U.S.
- Education: Princeton University; B.A., M.A., Ph.D.
- Occupations: Professor, Stanford University

Clifford Ivar Nass (April 3, 1958 – November 2, 2013) was a professor of communication at Stanford University, co-creator of The Media Equation theory, and a renowned authority on human-computer interaction (HCI). He was also known for his work on individual differences associated with media multitasking. Nass was the Thomas M. Storke Professor at Stanford and held courtesy appointments in Computer Science, Education, Law, and Sociology. He was also affiliated with the programs in Symbolic Systems and Science, Technology, and Society.

Nass was the director of the Communication between Humans and Interactive Media (CHIMe) Lab, co-director of Kozmetsky Global Collaboratory (KGC) and its Real-time Venture Design Laboratory (ReVeL), and a co-founder of TeachAids.

== Early life and education ==
Nass was born in Jersey City, New Jersey and raised in Teaneck, the son of Florence and Jules Nass. His parents formed New Jersey's first Mothers Against Drunk Driving chapter after Nass's older brother was killed by a drunk driver in 1981.

Nass graduated cum laude with an A.B. in mathematics from Princeton University in 1981 after completing a senior thesis, titled "PASCGRAF and the Haloed line effect", under the supervision of Arthur Appel. He then conducted research in the areas of computer graphics, data structures and database design for IBM and Intel before returning to Princeton to pursue graduate studies. He received a Ph.D. in sociology from Princeton in 1986 after completing a doctoral dissertation titled "Society as computer: the structure and skill of information work in the United States, 1900-1980." He then joined the faculty at Stanford University.

Nass died, age 55, of a heart attack in November 2013.

== Research and Books ==
He was the author of three books: The Media Equation, Wired for Speech, and The Man Who Lied to His Laptop. He has also published over 150 papers in the areas of human-computer interaction, statistical methodology, and organizational theory. He was credited with the founding of the Computers are social actors (CASA) paradigm. Nass consulted on the design of over 250 media products and services for companies including Microsoft, Toyota, Philips, BMW, Hewlett-Packard, AOL, Sony, and Dell.

== Early HCI Work ==
Nass’ early work was primarily in exploring ways people interacted with computers, particularly how those interactions are “fundamentally social” in nature. By identifying a social theme in people's interaction with computers, he was able to observe that humans project “agency” on computers, and thus people will interact with computers in the same ways as interacting with people.

For example, he showed how people will observe the “politeness norm” and focus on the first application they are interacting with if another application interrupts them (such as a pop-up window). He also showed how computer users engender computers and interact with them differently based on whether the computer is perceived as male or female – preferring to hear praise from a male computer voice, or receive relationship and love advice from a female computer voice, as examples. His 1994 presentation at the SIGCHI conference titled “Computers are Social Actors” outlined these and other observations on human computer interaction that led to the Computers are social actors paradigm.

== Mid-Career HCI Work ==
After establishing that people interact with computers the same way they interact with people, particularly when using voice interfaces, Nass began to study this topic in more detail, publishing several studies that show the etiquette components of reciprocity, politeness, and responding to and giving praise as no different between people and computers as they were people and people. This line of research led to the publishing of his book Wired for Speech : How Voice Activates and Advances the Human-Computer Relationship, in which he summarized the results of much of this work.

In 2007, Nass became a “dorm dad,” moving into a Stanford freshman residence hall. He was shocked and intrigued by the communication and technology practices of the students he observed. He watched as students utilized multiple devices all at once; texting, tweeting, listening to music and watching YouTube, all while working on homework. He began a line of investigation into multitasking and the effects it has on cognition, discovering that more people multitask, the worse multitaskers they become. This, Nass asserts, is due to losing the ability to filter out non-relative stimuli. In a Frontline interview in February 2010, Nass discusses the results of one of his experiments, saying “It turns out multitaskers are terrible at every aspect of multitasking. They're terrible at ignoring irrelevant information; they're terrible at keeping information in their head nicely and neatly organized; and they're terrible at switching from one task to another.” The results of these experiments were widely picked up in the media, and Nass was invited to give a TedX talk at Stanford on the subject titled “Are you multitasking your life away?”

== Late Career HCI Work ==
In The Man Who Lied to His Laptop, Nass summarizes many years of HCI research through the lens of what lessons they contain about human behavior and social relationships. The book, published in 2010, contains chapters on praise and criticism, personality, teams and team building, emotion, and persuasion.

Nass continued to explore the effects of multitasking later in his career, co-publishing a study with Roy Pea showing the negative impacts on social well-being of certain media usage and media multitasking in 8-12-year-old girls. This study also introduced a revised method for measuring media multitasking, building upon Nass’ earlier co-authored study with Eyal Ophir from 2009. The new, revised method for measuring media multitasking allowed a more granular measurement of media multitasking in participants, which in turn allowed him to compare this measure to other variables, such as self-satisfaction and contentment.

In addition to furthering the study of media multitasking, Nass also began to research the voice user interface in relation to autonomous vehicles. He published a study that shows when a voice user interface reframes poor driving conditions in a positive light, it helps to regulate driver's emotions, attitudes, and increases driving performance. He also published studies that show when a voice user interface in an autonomous vehicle describes the vehicle taking an action, say slowing down, by describing the “why” and the “how” led to better driving performance and feelings of trust and safety from the driver.

== Published books ==
- The Man Who Lied to His Laptop: What Machines Teach Us About Human Relationships. Penguin Group, 2010. ISBN 1-61723-001-4. Co-written with Corina Yen.
- Wired for Speech: How Voice Activates and Advances the Human-Computer Relationship. MIT Press, 2005. ISBN 0-262-14092-6. Co-written with Scott Brave.
- The Media Equation: How People Treat Computers, Television, and New Media Like Real People and Places. Cambridge University Press, 1996. ISBN 978-1-57586-053-4. Co-written with Byron Reeves.
