= South Tahoe High School =

Coordinates: 38°54′37″N 120°00′54″W

Location
- 1735 Lake Tahoe Blvd. Sierra Nevada; South Lake Tahoe, El Dorado County, California 96150; United States

Information
- Type: Public school
- Motto: Where Academics, Arts, and Athletics Take Center Stage
- Established: 1952
- School district: Lake Tahoe Unified School District
- CEEB code: 050075
- Principal: Justin Zunino
- Staff: 101
- Teaching staff: 57.80 (FTE)
- Grades: 9-12
- Gender: Co-educational
- Enrolment: 1,108 (2023-2024)
- Student to teacher ratio: 19.17
- Color
- Mascot: Viking
- Newspaper: The Viking Longship
- Yearbook: The Sotanian
- Website: sths.ltusd.org

South Tahoe High School (STHS) is a public high school in South Lake Tahoe, California, United States. It was established in 1952 and is the only high school that belongs to the Lake Tahoe Unified School District (LTUSD). The school mascot is the Viking and its colors are blue and gold.

South Tahoe High School has 890 students as of 2026. 20 percent of its students participate in the Advanced Placement courses and the school has been given a silver ranking by US News. In 2026, 5 percent of its students scored proficient or advanced on the English-Language Arts section of the Standardized Testing and Reporting (STAR) Program. On the History-Social Science section of the STAR, 3 percent of students scored proficient or advanced, and only 2 percent did so on the Mathematics section. In 2014, the tunnels underneath the school goy sealed

The school features an open-air campus. In June 2007, the school was surrounded by firefighters to avoid it being burned down in the devastating Angora Fire. In 2009, an extensive multi-year (completed 2013) set of renovations and new construction projects transformed the school's facilities. A new program began in 2014 to provide every student with a free Chromebook for the year.

== History ==
The official school campus map as of June 2015

South Tahoe High School was founded in 1952 in South Lake Tahoe. The school's campus was originally at the current South Tahoe Middle School, but it was later moved to its present location. The current school was built in an open-air style with most of the buildings not connected to each other with hallways.

In 1976 a high school senior, Kathleen Keohane, was murdered off-campus and the case remains unresolved.

The Angora Fire came within yards of the high school in June 2007. Dozens of firefighters surrounded the school to defend it from the flames.

From 1996 to 2013, the school and LTUSD experienced a downward trend of enrollment. In 2013, LTUSD had 36.6 percent fewer students than in 1996.

From 2009, the school began a $64.5 million venture to renovate many of their facilities and completed their goals by 2013. In the summer of 2011, the school began constructing a new student union and a new art building (Tahoe Arts Design Academy), and began rebuilding the "Viking Stadium." The Tahoe Arts Design Academy was modeled after a Hollywood studio and features a 300-seat theatre.

Ivonne Larson, the principal of South Tahoe from 2006-2014, was promoted to assistant superintendent and Chad Houck took over as principal.

Since 2014, the school offers Chromebooks to students for the year free of charge. The school has accepted the Google for Education service and it is provided on all of the Chromebooks. Houck has said that there has been a correlated 10 percent drop of missing assignments since they started the pilot Chromebook program.

Students at South Tahoe High School restarted a school newspaper in the fall of 2015 called The Viking Longship. The newspaper is published approximately every two weeks on the STHS website, in print, and via students' school-issued email accounts.

== Academics and enrollment ==
=== Enrollment ===
South Tahoe High School enrolls 1029 students and 53 full-time teachers. Females make up 48 percent of the students and males make up 52 percent. 43 percent of students are eligible for free lunch provided by the school. The following is a breakdown of student enrollment by ethnicity:

Ethnicity	Number	Percentage
White	524	51%
Hispanic	391	38%
Asian	72	7%
American Indian	10	1%
Black	10	1%
Hawaiian Native/Pacific Islander	2	0.2%
Two or more races	20	2%

The 9th grade is made up of 270 students; 10th has 281; 11th has 230; and 12th has 248. South Tahoe Middle School (STMS) is the only middle school in the Lake Tahoe Unified School District.

=== Achievement ===
The school received the California Gold Ribbon Schools Award from the California Department of Education in 2015. 56 percent of the students have participated in at least one Advanced Placement (AP) class and 52 percent of participants have passed at least one of their AP tests. The average number of AP exams taken per AP participant is 3.4. US News has given South Tahoe a silver ranking and a numerical rank of 1213th out of all high schools in the United States. In 1999, the school was named a California distinguished school by the state. In 2005, Newsweek magazine gave South Tahoe a rank of 996th out of 27,478 schools in the United States.

2013 was the last time that California public schools were required to administer the Standardized Testing and Reporting (STAR) Program since it was replaced by the California Assessment of Student Performance and Progress (CAASPP). In 2013, students at South Tahoe High demonstrated below average scores in all three areas tested by the STAR. The following shows the scores for the last STAR test compared the district and state average:

Percentage of students who scored proficient or advanced on the STAR testing
Subject	South Lake Tahoe High School	Lake Tahoe Unified School District	California
English-Language Arts	53	51	55
Mathematics	33	57	50
History-Social Science	41	38	49

The school has a low dropout rate at 5.5 percent, compared to the state average of 11.4 percent. However, 8.4 percent of its students have been suspended at some point, compared to the state average of 4.4 percent. South Tahoe has an average attendance rate of 89.1 percent. Beginning in 2014 and under the direction of Houck, the school has begun implementing a system of "Redemptive Citizenship Program" in which students receive demerits for breaking rules. Students with too many demerits are prohibited from some school activities.

== Athletics ==
Due to its proximity to Nevada, South Tahoe's athletic teams have competed as a member of the Nevada Interscholastic Activities Association (NIAA) along with two other similarly-isolated California schools nearby: Truckee High and North Tahoe High. The Vikings compete in the 1A level (second-largest) in the Northern Nevada region of the Nevada Interscholastic Activities Association. In its tenure in Division 1A, South Tahoe has seen the most success in skiing (boys'), soccer (boys') and cross country (boys') with three championships for all three sports. The boys' Alpine skiing team has won in three consecutive years, from 2008-2010. Additionally, South Tahoe competes in Far West Nordic cross country ski races.

=== Nevada Interscholastic Activities Association State Championships ===
The following table contains the years that students in each sport won a state championship (if applicable) in the 3A division of the NIAA:

Sport	Years	Citation
Cross country (boys)	1999, 2010, 2011	
Cross country (girls)	2004, 2005	
Basketball (boys)	1987, 1992	
Alpine skiing Combined (boys)	2008, 2009, 2010, 2013, 2014	
Alpine skiing Slalom (boys)	2008, 2009, 2010	
Alpine skiing Giant Slalom (boys)	2009, 2010, 2013, 2014	
Alpine skiing Combined (girls)	2015, 2018	
Alpine skiing Slalom (girls)	2010, 2012, 2013, 2015, 2017, 2018	
Tennis (Boys)	2023, 2024	
Alpine skiing Giant Slalom (girls)	2014, 2015, 2018	
Soccer (boys)	2003, 2005, 2010, 2023, 2024	
Soccer (girls)	2010, 2011, 2013, 2014	

== Notable alumni ==
The following are notable people who graduated from South Tahoe High School:

Person	Graduated	Known for
Jamie Anderson		Gold medalist at the 2014 Winter Olympics; four-time X Games gold medalist
Maddie Bowman	2012	Gold medalist at the 2014 Winter Olympics; three-time X Games gold medalist
Jerod Haase	1992	College basketball player for University of California, Berkeley, and University of Kansas; former head basketball coach at Stanford University
