= Tahoe Regional Planning Agency =

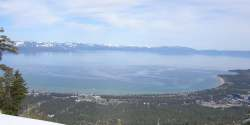
Lake Tahoe

The Tahoe Regional Planning Agency (TRPA) was formed in 1969 through a bi-state compact between California and Nevada, which the U.S. Congress ratified. The agency is mandated to protect the Lake Tahoe basin's environment through land-use regulations. It is one of only a few watershed-based regulatory agencies in the United States.

== Mission ==
TRPA and its mission are one-of-a-kind and represent an unprecedented attempt to address environmental, economic, and cultural values at both regional and local levels. The agency is the lead organization responsible for creating and implementing region-wide protection solutions. The agency is a symbol of environmental responsibility and stewardship and provides a legal means to govern the region. TRPA is recognized throughout the world for what it contributes to the science of resource protection. Much of the effort put forth is groundbreaking, and the problems addressed have no textbook remedies. This is, in part, what makes the agency a lightning rod, attracting a wide range of opinions and emotions.

The TRPA has adopted a three-pronged strategy to restore the environment of Lake Tahoe:

- Implement a regulatory program minimizing the negative impacts of new development.
- Improve the environment through a $1.5 billion capital improvement program, repairing damage caused by past development.
- Scientifically research the effectiveness of the regulatory and capital improvement programs.

The regulatory program has been in place for more than 35 years, and the TRPA evaluates itself every five years. While regulation is one of the pillars of the TRPA's plan, the agency also emphasizes the capital investment and scientific research components of its strategy, which are embodied in the Environmental Improvement Program (EIP).

TRPA is primarily an environmental agency, but recognizes the interdependency of environmental, economic, and social well-being in the Tahoe Region. Environmental groups, property rights advocates, business interests, and numerous government agencies agree that tourism and successful, locally owned businesses are the key to economic vitality at Lake Tahoe and depend on the region's environment. The TRPA Regional Plan is intended to set a measured rate of residential, commercial, and recreational growth, the impacts of which are controlled through mitigation measures.

== Governance ==
The TRPA governing board consists of 15 members (members shown in italics are required to reside outside of the TRPA region):

- California delegation (7 members):
  - One member appointed by the El Dorado County board of supervisors
  - One member appointed by the Placer County board of supervisors
  - One member appointed by the South Lake Tahoe city council
  - Two members appointed by the Governor of California
  - One member appointed by the speaker of the California State Assembly
  - One member appointed by the California State Senate rules committee
- Nevada delegation (7 members):
  - One member appointed by the Douglas County board of county commissioners
  - One member appointed by the Washoe County board of county commissioners
  - One member appointed by the Carson City board of supervisors
  - One member appointed by the Governor of Nevada
  - The Nevada Secretary of State (or his designee)
  - The director of the Nevada Department of Conservation and Natural Resources (or his designee)
  - One member chosen by the other members of the Nevada delegation
- One non-voting member chosen by the President of the United States

At present, the make up is composed of seven trained as attorneys (with the executive director licensed to practice law in Washington DC), five elected politicians, two environmentalists, and the deputy director from the Nevada Department of Conservation and Natural Resources.

== Controversy and criticism ==
Since the Tahoe Regional Planning Agency must regulate how individuals develop their property within a fragile environment, controversy and criticism are no strangers. TRPA has been collecting research on the effects of development on Lake Tahoe's clarity for more than 35 years, and has set limits on the amount of land that buildings and pavement can cover, called land coverage, on an individual parcel (ranging from 1% in areas it deems to be highly sensitive areas to 30% in areas deemed to be least sensitive areas). The designation of sensitivity is at the sole discretion of the TRPA.

Lake Tahoe residents, the State of California, environmental groups and property rights groups have repeatedly sued TRPA to change restrictions and fees in the Tahoe Region. The charges levied against TRPA represent a wide range of grievances and displeasure with the agency, claiming that the agency is too powerful, abusive or biased, exclusively run by non-elected officials, or applying selective environmental data that goes far beyond their mandate of environmental protection, and asserting restrictions on residents and development of private property violate a range of laws, including the Takings Clause in the U.S. constitution.

There is also concern over the scientific evidence TRPA uses to form its regulations. For example, for more than 20 years, the construction of new piers in "prime fish habitat" areas was prohibited. Still, later studies showed that some artificial structures in "feeding and escape cover" habitat areas could actually benefit fish populations.

Criticism of TRPA often falls under the category of economics. Some business owners and homeowners express concern that they want more freedom to build or expand to realize the maximum value from their properties. TRPA says it works diligently to find innovative ways for property owners to develop their properties in environmentally sensitive ways and has created programs that balance environmental impacts through mitigation. Still, this claim is also disputed, with critics arguing that the TRPA is unaccountable and ignores the public. Mitigation measures usually take the form of fees used to fund environmental improvement and restoration projects. Still, there is no way for residents and businesses to verify whether the mitigation fees they paid were applied to actual environmental mitigation. Some feel that the fees amount to undue taxation, such as a per-day fee for visitors renting a passenger vehicle. In 2021, this fee was $5.50 per day, with the proceeds earmarked to fund public transportation, which some argue falls outside of the 1969 TRPA Charter. TRPA posts their fee schedule online which shows that homeowners and businesses must pay potentially thousands of dollars in parcel improvement application fees, including site assessment fees, Information Technology fees, surveys fees, processing fees, per square footage fees, and many other static and variable fees before an individual or business can even begin to plan for improvement to their private lot. The fees have been viewed as discriminatory in practice, with only wealthy residents and businesses able to afford them, compared to surrounding cities and counties.

In 2005, in an effort to bring all buoys on the lake into compliance with current regulations, TRPA initially proposed a $5,000 fee for the first buoy and a $7,500 fee for the second. Many residents protested, believing the TRPA lacked the power to levy taxes. Due to public opposition and guidance from the TRPA Governing Board, a new proposal was made in 2006, reducing the permitting fee to $500 for the first buoy and $1,500 for the second. If the fee is approved, the agency claims it would be used to offset the impacts to water quality and to fund a watercraft and illegal buoy enforcement program. The proposal, after two years of discussion, was supposed to be finalized in February 2007. But the League to Save Lake Tahoe and the Sierra Club, which want the pier moratorium to continue, continued to protest the changes. Furthermore, some California government agencies continue to question the environmental impacts of more piers.

Other individuals and public interest groups feel that TRPA does not go far enough in strictly controlling development. They claim that, since Lake Tahoe belongs to everyone, property owners must take responsibility for the impacts of their development. Further, supporters of the agency's policies point out that comprehensive management strategies in communities across the nation are funded by assessing fees on the associated properties and participants who benefit the most from such impacts.

Other issues the agency is criticized for are fine amounts and local representation at the agency. TRPA fine amounts are generally around $5,000 for violations such as unpermitted tree cutting. While some critics say such fines aren't large enough, since a wealthy lakefront owner may happily pay that much to improve their view, others argue that it is further evidence of TRPA's overreaching expansion. Since TRPA is a bi-state entity with quasi-federal powers, state & local elected officials have little recourse in opposing the agency's strategies. Although half of the TRPA's 15-member Governing Board is made up of locally elected officials, there is public sentiment that they have only the courts to turn to for balance. If anyone contests the agency's decisions, they feel they are painted as being against the environment. Furthermore, critics of the agency have alleged that TRPA staff represent themselves as "locals", which is actually true of most of the board and the staff. However, a small percentage of staff members live outside the Tahoe basin, in nearby areas such as Carson City. Since staff are the individuals with whom most negotiations are conducted and who propose nearly all agenda items the Governing Board hears, there is local sentiment that the agency serves too few and is not working in the best interests of residents and businesses. A movement led by local property rights groups and real estate developers to have all Governing Board members elected by residents has been pushed for several years. Still, it has thus far been resisted by government officials and environmental groups, due to concern that environmental protection of the lake will be compromised in favor of development.

An example of the controversy the agency faces is development in the shore zone. Lake Tahoe's shore zone is where the lake meets the land. Because of its relationship to the quality of scenery, recreation, and lake clarity, the shore zone is one of the most sensitive areas in the region. The Environmental Protection Agency has designated Lake Tahoe as Outstanding National Resource Waters under the Clean Water Act. Having this special designation calls for a non-degradation standard and a high level of protection. There are only three bodies of water on the West Coast with this designation; Mono Lake in California, and Crater Lake in Oregon are the other two.

The shore zone of Lake Tahoe has a long and challenging history. Regulations affecting the construction of piers, buoys, and other shore-zone-related issues have been the subject of extensive research and debate since the 1980s. The Tahoe Lakefront Homeowners Association and others call for fewer restrictions on development, claiming that every lakefront property owner should be allowed to build a pier. Other groups, such as the League to Save Lake Tahoe and the Sierra Club, argue that allowing hundreds of new piers will harm fish habitat and scenic quality, and will further block public access to beaches and inhibit kayaking along the shore.

For more than 25 years, the TRPA has not allowed new structures such as piers in areas considered "prime fish habitat." These areas are still considered limited and fragile. However, the aforementioned scientific studies, conducted over 15 years, showed that protective measures could be taken to reduce the impacts of additional piers on the lake and that some underwater structures actually benefited fish populations in "feed and escape cover" habitat areas. In 2005 and 2006, after 20 years of debate, the agency released an environmental document with alternatives that would allow some new development in the shore zone, but also balanced new development with programs that increased public beach access, protected sensitive areas, and set high development standards.

According to the agency, the shore zone example shows how TRPA attempts to serve all members of the public fairly by using the best available science and planning practices to protect Lake Tahoe and create a balance between the maman-madend natural environments. The agency says it understands that on some controversial issues, consensus isn't possible. But after robust collaboration between TRPA and the public, common ground can emerge, enabling the process to move forward. Even so, the shore zone changes remain in limbo.

== Angora Fire/Caldor Fire and backlash against TRPA ==
In June 2007, the Angora Fire burned 3,100 acres (13 km^{2}) and destroyed 254 residences and many other structures adjacent to South Lake Tahoe. A reversal of the winds as the fire approached the city limits near the "Y" (junction of US50 and 89) saved the area from a far more devastating disaster. Owners, developers' rights groups, and local real estate lobbyists immediately charged that the structures burned because of TRPA's strict environmental regulations. While inconsistent with Cal Fire regulations, TRPA field staff prohibited property owners from establishing proper defensible space around their homes. It required laying down newly fallen, highly flammable dry pine needles for erosion control, in favor of lake clarity. In public hearings, TRPA countered that defensible space has always been a significant agency concern and has always been encouraged by the agency, citing published TRPA regulations, public documents, and previous public hearings. However, in post-fire hearings, those who lost their homes were so infuriated that security escorts were required to protect the TRPA Staff's exit.

Prompted by local newspaper articles quoting allegations that TRPA staff forced homeowners to pile dry pine needles and other flammable materials around their homes, even up against the structures, creating dangerous fire hazards, state and local politicians swiftly called for investigations into TRPA policies and staff misconduct. In July 2007, California and Nevada governors Arnold Schwarzenegger and Jim Gibbons signed a bi-state "Blue Ribbon Fire Commission" agreement to investigate fire issues in the Lake Tahoe basin, including TRPA regulations that caused problems that led to the loss of hundreds of structures.

While not meeting the legal threshold of staff misconduct and detrimental agency policies, the U.S. Forest Service fire investigations in the Angora Fire confirmed that most of the structures caught fire from "firebrands"—pieces of burning wood—carried in the smoke column either from neighboring structures or from nearby burning vegetation. The investigations found that a few older homes had highly flammable wooden shake roofs and inadequate fire clearance around the structures. In some cases, winter firewood and kindling supplies were piled too close to homes. The study did state that dead and dying vegetation along Angora Creek "likely contributed" to the fire's rapid spread. Native riparian vegetation in "stream environment zones" (such as Angora Creek) in the Tahoe Region is protected as a sensitive resource, and removal of vegetation from these areas is vigorously restricted by TRPA to protect soils, habitat, and water quality.

While fire investigators have concluded that several factors contributed to the disastrous fire, including unburned piles from previous forest thinning projects, lack of defensible space, stockpiling of flammable materials near structures, and thick ground cover, they found that several structures actually burned the surrounding vegetation—not the other way around.

There is continuing disagreement regarding ground cover within 30 feet (9.1 m) of structures. In certain cases, TRPA regulations require ground cover to protect disturbed soil from soil erosion. Ground cover may often be lawn or other landscaping; however, site-specific native vegetation or naturally occurring forest litter, such as a thin layer of pine needles or wood chips, is generally the environmentally preferable alternative and is more cost-effective and easier to maintain. While some groups argue that utilizing pine needles and wood chips as ground cover up to the 30-foot perimeter of a structure is a violation of California Public Resources Code 4291 requiring defensible space in California, a 0.5 to 1 inch (13 to 25 mm) covering of forest litter (duff layer), once decay has taken place, is not sufficient to carry a flame intense enough to burn structures from a distance of 30-feet away. However, freshly applied pine needles remain highly flammable until decomposition is complete. Regardless, TRPA staff and local fire groups are investigating possible nonflammable or flame-retardant alternatives to provide both soil protection and fire prevention. In addition, TRPA staff and board members state they are working with the local fire protection districts to simplify procedures for homeowners to implement defensible space requirements around their homes, eliminate confusion and possible conflicts regarding TRPA erosion control requirements and defensible space requirements, and ease restrictions on the use of heavy machinery in sensitive areas near communities. However, after the Angora Fire, it took the TRPA over 15-years to clarify pine needle removal guidelines, with homeowners and businesses remaining subject to TRPA fines of $5000 or more for removing pine needles beyond 5-feet of a structure (a.k.a. Zone 0 space) until 2022 as ground cover within their defensible fire space zone remained in direct contradiction to the 30-foot guidelines for defensible space (Zone 1) that was consistently recommended by the California Department of Forestry and Fire Protection, which explicitly recommends to "remove dead or dry leaves and pine needles". The TRPA requires an $83 non-refundable filing fee with any tree removal application, further slowing defensible space creation and arguably prevents lower income residents from defending their space.

While investigations into the causes and effects of the Angora Fire indicate that allegations of staff misconduct may have occurred and that resource protection policies may not have been the root cause of the disaster, anti-TRPA sentiment remains extremely high among most residents. Many have concluded that the agency has infringed on property rights and public safety and has impeded economic development in the Lake Tahoe region.

In August/September 2021, during the Caldor Fire, government crews cut large swaths to the bare soil and aggressively thinned neighboring forests to protect the city. This emergency act lowered the fire height from hundreds of feet, as seen during the Angora fire approaching the Y-area, to about 15 feet, thus saving the city. As a result, significant tree thinning without the required TRPA permits and the removal of freshly fallen pine needles to the bare ground occurred widely. Proactive techniques for applying Phos-check home defense fire-retardant products to vegetation have also become more widespread. While clearly, the Angora Fire has reinvigorated the public taking hold of their own safety, the Caldor Fire has cemented it.

== See also ==
Tahoe-Sierra Preservation Council, Inc. v. Tahoe Regional Planning Agency, 535 U.S. 302 (2002), a 2002 United States Supreme Court case involving the regulatory power of the agency.

Suitum v. Tahoe Regional Planning Agency, 520 U.S. 725 (1997), a 1997 United States Supreme Court case holding that a federal court should not consider a claim against an agency before the government has reached a “final” decision. See also, Pakdel v. City and County of San Francisco, 594 U.S. ___ (2021).
