= Lake Tahoe Unified School District =

School district in California, United States

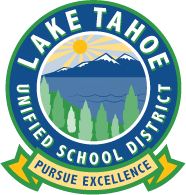

Location
- 1021 Al Tahoe Blvd. South Lake Tahoe, California 96150 United States

District information
- Motto: Pursue Excellence
- Superintendent: Todd E Cutler, Ed.D.

Other information
- Website: www.ltusd.org

Lake Tahoe Unified School District (LTUSD) is a public school district in El Dorado County, California, United States. Included in the district are four primary (elementary) schools, one middle school, one high school, a continuation high school, and one independent learning school. As of 2014, the district had a total enrollment of 3881 across its eight schools and has enjoyed minor growth from the previous year.

The district includes South Lake Tahoe and Meyers.

As of July 2020, the school's superintendent is Todd E. Cutler, Ed.D., who took over from former superintendent James R. Tarwater. The assistant superintendent is Annamarie Cohen, who was the previous director of LTUSD Student Services Department. The school board members are Barbara Bannar (president), Valerie Mansfield (clerk), Troy Matthews, Larry Reilly, and Bonnie Turnbull.

== Enrollment ==
LTUSD has eight total schools. From 1996 to 2013, the enrollment across the entire district has gone down over 30%. However, the enrollment of fall 2014 was 3881, up from 3855 from 2013. About 11% of the district's students receive special education; 59.9% qualify for free or reduced lunch, and 6.3% are homeless.

The following is a table complete with enrollment information about each school, with the exclusion of the Independent Learning Academy and inclusion of the district's Transitional Learning Center:

School name	Enrollment	Female	Male
Bijou Community School	582	276	306
Environmental Science Magnet	397	203	194
Sierra House Elementary	502	227	275
Tahoe Valley Elementary	474	223	251
South Tahoe Middle School	817	389	428
South Tahoe High School	984	477	507
Mt. Tallac	87	38	49
Transitional Learning Center	38	7	31
2014 Districtwide	3881	1840	2041

== Faculty ==
The current superintendent is Todd E Cutler, Ed.D., and the assistant superintendent is Annamarie Cohen, who was the previous director of LTUSD Student Services Department. Each member of the board of education serves a distinct area of South Lake Tahoe and the surrounding area. The following details each board member and which zone serve:

Board member	Area #	Notes
Barbara Banner	5 (Northern)	She is the president of the board.
Valerie Mansfield	4	She is clerk of the board.
Bonnie Turnbull	3	
Larry Reilly	1	
Troy Matthews	2	
Laurie Kempler	5 (Southern)	She is a provisional member.

The faculty, and especially Tarwater, has been supportive of a pilot program to provide every student with a Chromebook free of charge. In 2015, the district approved of the purchase of an additional 1000 new Chromebooks for the 2015–2016 school year.

== Schools ==
=== South Tahoe High School ===
The official school map of South Tahoe High School

South Tahoe High School was founded in 1952 in South Lake Tahoe. The school mascot is the Viking and the school's colors are blue and gold. Its enrollment is the highest of any school that belongs to LTUSD, at 984 in 2014. The school's campus was originally at the current South Tahoe Middle School, but it was later moved to its present location. The current school was built in an open-air style, with most of the buildings not connected to each other with hallways. The Angora Fire came within a quarter mile of the high school in June 2007. Dozens of firefighters had to surround the school to defend it from the flames.

From 2009, the school began a $64.5 million venture to renovate many of their facilities and completed their goals by 2013. In the summer of 2011, the school began constructing a new student union and a new art building (Tahoe Arts Design Academy) and began rebuilding their Viking Stadium. The Tahoe Arts Design Academy was modeled after a Hollywood studio and features a 300-seat theatre. Ivone Larson, the principal of South Tahoe 2006–2014, was promoted to assistant superintendent and remained until 2015. Chad Houck took over as principal from 2014-2017. Carline Sinkler took over from 2017 to the present

=== South Tahoe Middle School ===
The official school map of South Tahoe Middle School

South Tahoe Middle School is the only middle school that belongs to LTUSD. The school's mascot is the timberwolf. Its enrollment was 817 in 2014. Its campus does not feature an open-air style campus, unlike South Tahoe High School. The current track was built in 2007 after a $250,000 donation was given to the school by Ray Sidney, a former Google engineer.

=== Elementary schools ===
LTUSD has three traditional schools (Bijou Community School, Sierra House Elementary, and Tahoe Valley Elementary) and one magnet elementary school (Environmental Magnet School, located in Meyers, which (as its name suggests, along with its location near Lake Tahoe) has a special focus on environmental sciences).
