= The Media Equation =

Communication theory

The Media Equation is a general communication theory that claims people tend to assign human characteristics to computers and other media, and treat them as if they were real social actors. The effects of this phenomenon on people experiencing these media are often profound, leading them to behave and to respond to these experiences in unexpected ways, most of which they are completely unaware of.

Originally based on the research of Clifford Nass and Byron Reeves at Stanford University, the theory explains that people tend to respond to media as they would either to another person (by being polite, cooperative, attributing personality characteristics such as aggressiveness, humor, expertise, and gender) – or to places and phenomena in the physical world – depending on the cues they receive from the media. Numerous studies that have evolved from the research in psychology, social science and other fields indicate that this type of reaction is automatic, unavoidable, and happens more often than people realize. Reeves and Nass (1996) argue that, “Individuals’ interactions with computers, television, and new media are fundamentally social and natural, just like interactions in real life,” (p. 5).

== The Media Equation Test (1996) ==
Reeves and Nass established two rules before the test- when a computer asks a user about itself, the user will give more positive responses than when a different computer asks the same question. They expected people to be less variable with their responses when they took a test and then answered a questionnaire on the same computer. They wanted to see that computers, although not human, can implement social responses. The independent variable was the computer (there are two in the test), and the dependent variable was the evaluation responses, and the control was a pen-and-paper questionnaire.

Reeves and Nass designed an experiment with 22 participants and told them they would be working with a computer to learn about random facts of American pop culture. At the end of the session they would ask the participants to evaluate the computer that they used. They would have to tell Reeves and Nass how they felt about that computer and how well it performed. 20 facts were presented in each session, and participants would answer if they knew “a great deal, somewhat, or very little” about the statement. After the session, participants were tested on the material and told which questions they had answered correctly or incorrectly. Computer #1 then made a statement of its own performance by always stating that it “did a good job”.

Participants were then divided into 2 groups to evaluate the computer's performance and participants were asked to describe this performance from the choice of about 20 adjectives. Half of the participants were assigned to evaluate on computer #1, the computer that praised its own work. The other half were sent to another computer across the room to evaluate computer #1's performance.

The conclusion resulted in evaluations done on computer #1 after testing on computer #1 yielded much more positive responses about the session. Evaluations completed on the other computer after testing on computer #1 resulted in much more varied and more negative responses about the session. For the control, the pen-and-paper questionnaire, the evaluations had similar results to that of evaluations done on computer #2. Participants felt more comfortable being honest when a different computer or pen-and-paper questionnaire asked about the sessions completed on computer #1. It is as if participants were talking behind the computer #1's back- not being honest to it, but then expressing more honesty to a third party evaluator. Reeves and Nass found that participants had automatic social reactions during the test.

Reeves and Nass ran the test again but added a voice speaker to both computers that would verbally communicate information to make the human-social theme more explicit. The test resulted in almost exactly the same results. They concluded that people are polite to computers in both verbal and textual scenarios. The participants did not need much of a cue to respond socially to the computers. The experiment supports the hypothesis that social rules can apply to media, and computers can be social initiators. Participants denied being intentionally polite to the computer, but the results suggest differently.

== Propositions ==
The media equation relies on eight propositions derived from the research:

1. Everyone responds socially and naturally to media – The media equation applies to everyone regardless of their experience, education level, age, technology proficiency, or cultures.
2. Media are more similar than different – Psychologically speaking, a computer is not much different from a television and a sophisticated version of a technology is remarkably similar to a simpler version of the technology. As Reeves and Nass (1996) say, “social and natural responses come from people, not from media themselves,” (p. 252). In other words, the media does not make people react the way they do.
3. The media equation is automatic – Since the media equation assumes that responses are “social and natural” then these reactions occur automatically without conscious effort. This can occur with minimal prompting.
4. Many different responses characterize the media equation – The media equation occurs even with the most passive uses of media. When using any type of media, a person is likely to assign it a personality, pay extra attention to it, or even assess its personality.
5. What seems true is more important than what is true – Perception of reality is far more influential than the actual objective reality. A person can know that a computer is a box made of wires and processors but can still assign a personality to it. The important point to remember is that these responses are just part of being human and participating in a communication event.
6. People respond to what is present – Despite knowing that the media merely provide a symbolic version of the world, people still tend to respond to what the media appears to be as if it were real and immediately present. For the most part, people are more concerned with the interpretation of cues or messages they receive, rather than trying to determine the original intention of the message's creators.
7. People like simplicity – The need for simplicity and to reduce complexity is an innate human need. People are comfortable with simple. Simplicity indicates a level of predictability that makes people more comfortable.
8. Social and natural is easy – When interacting with media, Reeves and Nass (1996) argue, “people should be able to use what comes naturally – rules for social relationships and rules for navigating the physical world,” (p. 255). People already know how to function in the natural world (be polite, how to handle difficult personalities) so designers should take these reactions and phenomena into consideration when designing new media.

== Explanations ==
According to Nass and Reeves, assigning social roles, emotions and human characters to media is an innate human response and there are three proposed explanations – “anthropomorphism, the computer-as-proxy, and mindlessness." Anthropomorphism suggests that we recognize human qualities to technical beings; the computer-as-proxy is that we see the computer as human because it merely represents the responses of the human programmer; mindlessness refers to how we humans automatically react or respond to “human-like cues” unconsciously. Johnson and Gardner tested mindlessness as one of the explanations of the media equation theory, and they investigated if different moods will affect participants’ tendency to stereotypes when interacting with computers. The participants were asked to watch a tutorial with manipulation of either a positive or negative mood and then the tutorial used a male or female voice. The results showed that females participants who were in a positive mood showed more tendency to gender-stereotype computers than female participants who were in a negative mood. No such pattern was found in male participants, however. Nevertheless, the finding in female participants shows that mindlessness is more likely to occur when people are in a mindless state because, according to Johnson and Gardner, first, people who are in a happy mood may not feel the need to use their cognitive effort to process the environment; second, people tend to avoid using their cognitive effort when in a happy mood unless doing so can maintain or elevate their good mood; third, negative effect suggests that there may be a threat in the environment which will require more systematic processing but positive effect suggests that the environment may be safe, and thus no need to expand cognitive effort.

On the other hand, another study found cognitive evaluation may influence the effect of the media equation. The research tested the level of threat to fundamental human needs elicited by the cyberball-paradigm and real-life behavior afterward with a sample of 45 university students. The participants are assigned to two conditions, playing cyber ball with an avatar and playing ball with an agent. Both groups reported lower fundamental human need satisfaction after the group exclusion. However, subsequently, participants from the avatar condition reported being sadder due to the exclusion and more confident due to the inclusion than the agent group. In real-life social behavior tests, all participants in the exclusion condition left a larger seating space in the proxemics test and took a longer time to help pick up the pen. Particularly, participants excluded by avatars took significantly longer time to perform helping behavior. It indicates that the media equation is valid for immediate response to social exclusion, whereas temporally delayed emotional and behavioral reactions for agents and avatars differ, which might be due to the participants are no longer in a mindless state.

The assumptions and conclusions of the media equation are based on a rigorous research agenda that relies on objective empirical data using reliable social science research methods. As Reeves and Nass (1996) explain, “Our strategy for learning about media was to go to the social science section of the library, find theories and experiments about human-human interaction – and then borrow…Take out a pen, cross out ‘human’ or ‘environment’ and substitute media. When we did this, all of the predictions and experiments led to the media equation: People's responses to media are fundamentally social and natural,” (p. 251). The empirical data to support the media equation is thorough and expansive. Studies have tested a wide variety of communication characteristics with the media – manners, personality, emotion, social roles and form. Below are explanations of some of the more interesting findings that support the media equation.

=== Politeness ===
Politeness is one measure that researchers have used to study human-computer interaction. Being polite is an automatic response in most interpersonal interactions. When a person asks a question about themselves, most people will give a positive response, even if it may be a dishonest answer, to avoid hurting the other person's feelings. To test this idea with human-computer interaction, researchers designed an experiment in which participants would work with a computer on a tutoring exercise. The computer would provide them with a fact about American culture and then provide supplemental information. The computer then prompted participants to take a test to evaluate what they have learned. After completing the tests participants were asked to evaluate the computer's performance. The participants were assigned to one of three conditions – a pencil and paper evaluation, an evaluation on a different computer, or an evaluation on the same computer. The results indicate that participants who were asked to evaluate the same computer gave the computer more positive feedback than the other two conditions. To learn more about this experiment, see Nass, Moon, & Carney, 1999.

=== Negativity ===
In psychology there is a law of hedonic asymmetry that says evaluations of good and bad are important but not the same; negative experiences tend to dominate. In other words, people tend to dwell on the negative more than the positive. Responses to negative situations are automatic and require more attention to process than positive experiences. Allocating more resources to process negative information takes away from resources available to process positive information, thus impeding one's ability to remember events preceding the negative event. The media equation suggests that people have a similar experience when they encounter a negative experience with media. A study was developed to examine the idea that “negative images retroactively inhibit memory for material that precedes them, while they proactively enhance memory for material that follows them,” (Newhagen & Reeves, 1992, p. 25). In other words, will watching negative images on the news prevent someone from remembering information that they learned just prior to viewing the negative material? And conversely, will they better remember information they received just after viewing the negative material?

In the study, researchers created two versions of the same news story – one with compelling negative images and one without. Participants were asked to watch a 20-minute news video (half of the participants saw the negative images and the other half did not) and an additional ten-minute video. They were instructed to pay attention because they would be tested afterwards. A follow up survey was sent 6 to 7 weeks later to measure memory and recall from the news video. The results support the idea that people better remember information that comes after a negative event. Respondents who viewed the negative images better remembered the second half of the newscast than the part preceding the negative images. The findings of this study further support the media equation assumption that mediated experiences are the same as natural experiences.

For a more in depth look at this study, see Newhagen & Reeves, 1992.

=== Teammates ===
Psychology has demonstrated that being a part of a team has a direct influence on attitude and behavior of team members. Members of a team think they are more similar to each other than people on the outside. There are two main characteristics that define team interactions – identity and interdependence. For a group to become a team the members must identify with each other and exhibit some degree of interdependence on each other. These two characteristics were tested to determine if a computer can be a teammate.

In this study, participants were assigned to one of two conditions. In the first condition they would be paired with a computer and would become the blue team. The computer had a blue sticker and the human wore a blue wristband to signify that they were in fact a team. The second condition was blue individual, in which a person would use a computer but they were not considered teammates, rather the computer was just a resource. The task was to complete a “Desert Survival Guide” activity in which participants rank items they deem most important if they were left on a deserted island. Human participants initially completed the activity on their own and then completed it using a computer (either as a teammate where both the computer and human were evaluated or just using the computer as a resource). Finally, the participants were allowed to revise their rankings, if they wished to do so. The results of this study indicated that participants who worked with the computer as a teammate viewed the computer as more like them, worked in a similar style to their own, was more cooperative and friendlier than people who worked individually. Another finding of this study showed that participants who worked with the computer as a teammate were more likely to change their behavior and conform to the group ideal even when the teammate was a computer. This study supports the notion that developing a sense of interdependency is the key to establishing team affiliation. For a more detailed account of this study, see Nass, Fogg, & Moon, 1996.

=== Manners, personality, and social roles ===
Nass and Reeves found that people are more polite to computers they regularly use than computers they have not used before, and people also tend to assign personality traits to things that have the resemblance of a face. For example, when Apple first introduced iPhone X in 2017, it started a whole new era for smart phones of all-screen display. Since then, a lot of people have referred the top black notch on the screen as "the bangs" because of the similar resemblance. Thus, Nass and Reeves believe that we assign personality traits to phones, computers, and other devices and we get annoyed at Siri when it tells a bad joke. We also assign social roles to media or in other words, we humanize media, according to Nass and Reeves. For example, a TV can be a friend, a teacher, an ally or an enemy depending on what kind of personal traits we choose to assign - people give more credit to the same content shown on national TV news channel like NBC than the same content on a niche TV station. Furthermore, we also assign gender roles to technology by referring to Siri as a he if it has a male voice or a she if it has a female voice.

These are just a few of the many studies that support the media equation. For more in depth reading on this subject and past studies, see the “Further Reading” section at the end of this article.

== Media equation and presence ==
Media equation theory is closely related to studies of presence. In Lee’s research on the presence phenomena, he categorizes the media equation in two situations: “the automatic application of folk-physics modules to virtual objects” and “the automatic application of folk-psychology modules to virtual social actors stimulating humans”. For the first type of media equation, research has found people continue to pay more attention to big objects in virtual settings since our mindset is trained to believe that big objects are more threatening in real life. In particular, results find participants reports movements on the larger television screen appeared to be faster and experienced a greater sense of movement, led to greater excitement and physiological arousal. Similarly, researches found people have a large tolerance for differences in visual fidelity just as in a real setting, because human naturally sees the world under a peripheral vision field. Lastly, people often pay more attention to moving objects even though they cause no harm in virtual settings, unlike in real life.

Folk psychology also demonstrates significance in digital social presence. For example, people demonstrate reciprocal behavior when interacting with computers. Participants work harder to help the computer calibrate resolution when the computer helped them earlier; People are more likely to disclose personal information to computers which disclose their information as well. In these cases, reciprocity behavior developed in the anthropomorphic module is automatically applied in conversations with virtual social agents. Furthermore, people are inclined to find cues to determine personality traits even when interacting with computers, just as we do in social interactions.

== Alternative explanations ==
Some alternative explanations for the media equation have been proposed. But, as Nass and Moon (2000) argue, these explanations do not add up to the body of empirical evidence that supports the media equation. One explanation is that people attribute human characteristics to computers, also known as anthropomorphism. Nass and Moon (2000) refute this claim, saying, “Participants in our experiment were adult, experienced computer users. When debriefed, they insisted that they would never respond socially to a computer, and vehemently denied the specific behavior they had in fact exhibited during the experiments,” (p. 93). A second argument against media equation is that participants are actually responding to the programmers behind the computer. Nass and Moon (2000) refute this argument by citing that studies involving multiple computers generally found differences in interactions from computer to computer. If a person was interacting with the programmer behind the computer, then there would be no difference in interaction between computers. Critics have also argued that the way the experiments and questionnaires were designed in the Stanford research may have predisposed their subjects to interact socially with technology. Nass and Moon (2000) counter-argued by saying that the experiments were not misleading. None of the computers used in the experiments were personalized; the computer never referred to itself as “I” and participants interacted with simple text on a screen.

=== Grice's maxims ===
Reeves and Nass explain that H. Paul Grice's maxims for communication are perhaps the most generally accepted rules on how conversational implicatures are generated and that Grice's rules are a vital basis for explaining the media equation. The four principles consist of Quality, Quantity, Clarity, and Relevance. Reeves and Nass used these principles to help explain how they believed computers could be social actors. Quality refers to how information presented in a conversation should have value, truth, and importance. Quantity refers to how speakers in interaction should present just the right amount of information to make the conversation as useful as possible. Too much or too little information may damage the value of information. Reeves and Nass argue that quantity is not something social media executed very well; they feel it causes frustration because computers display too much or too little information to humans when trying to communicate. Relevance refers to the content of information being translated into an interaction- this information should be both relevant and on-topic. Reeves and Nass argue that computers should be customizable so the user has control over relevance, and they observed how computers struggle to respond to the wishes or the goals of the users.

Reeves and Nass argue that Grice's maxims are vital guidelines to the media equation because violations of these rules have a social significance. If one side of social interaction violates a rule, it may come off to the other party as a lack of attention being paid, or a diminishing of the importance of the conversation; in other words, they get offended. This leads to a negative consequence for both the party that violated a rule and the value of conversation.

== Opposing research results ==
=== Collecting information in game ===
In the study which examines the effectiveness of survey bots collecting data in a 3D virtual game, Second Life, researchers found the result both supports and contradict the media equation theory. The bot and human interview would walk up to avatars in Second Life and cask survey questions using private message chatterboxes. The result shows the bot and human interviewers are equally successful in collecting real-life information in the virtual setting. However, when examining the polarity of the responses, researchers found most responses collected by the bot are neutral, whereas most of the responses collected by humans are considered to be negative.

== Applications and extensions ==
=== Robotics ===
In a study that examines the pupillary responses to robots and human emotions, researchers found results supporting the Uncanny Valley and the media equation theory. The researchers record the pupil size of 40 participants while they view and rate the pictures of robots and human faces expressing various emotions. The appearances of the robots range from cartoon-like, or less human-like, to more human-like. Later, the participants are asked to fill out a questionnaire asking them whether they could imagine real-life social interaction with robots to based on their likeliness to humans. According to The results, robots that were considered to be closely humanlike performed worse on imagined social interaction elicited lesser pupil dilations and were harder to identify when displaying emotional emotions. In addition, across various emotional situations, pupil dilation pattern appears to be very similar between robot and human stimuli. Therefore, it supports the uncanny Vally and the media equation theory through a physiological lens.

=== Education ===
In recent years, serious games, or games for learning, have gained increasing popularity in the field of education. Digital game-based learning explores the effectiveness of games for serious purposes. By immersing in a dynamic, interactive, and visualized gaming environment, learners are likely to develop motivation, enthusiasm, and involvement. Based on the media equation theory, people will react to media interactions as if they are in real life. Just as in real life, when designing serious games, producers should consider visualizations that enrich game interfaces may also become distractions that reduce study efficiency and increase cognitive burdens. Therefore, a balance needs to be reached when creating digital environments that nurture study habits while stimulating user enthusiasm.

=== Health care ===
In a study examining patients’ responses to bad news delivered by human and robot doctors, researchers found participants prefer the robot’s message better. By employing the frequentist and Bayesian statistics, researchers tested the media equation and Computers are Social Actors (CASA) validity. Based on the result, the media equation does not hold true. Participants reported preferring receiving negative results from messages from a humanoid robot than telemedicine with humans. This preference may due to the lack of emotional expression directing the focus on the information itself.
