= Angora Peak =

Mountain in the American state of California

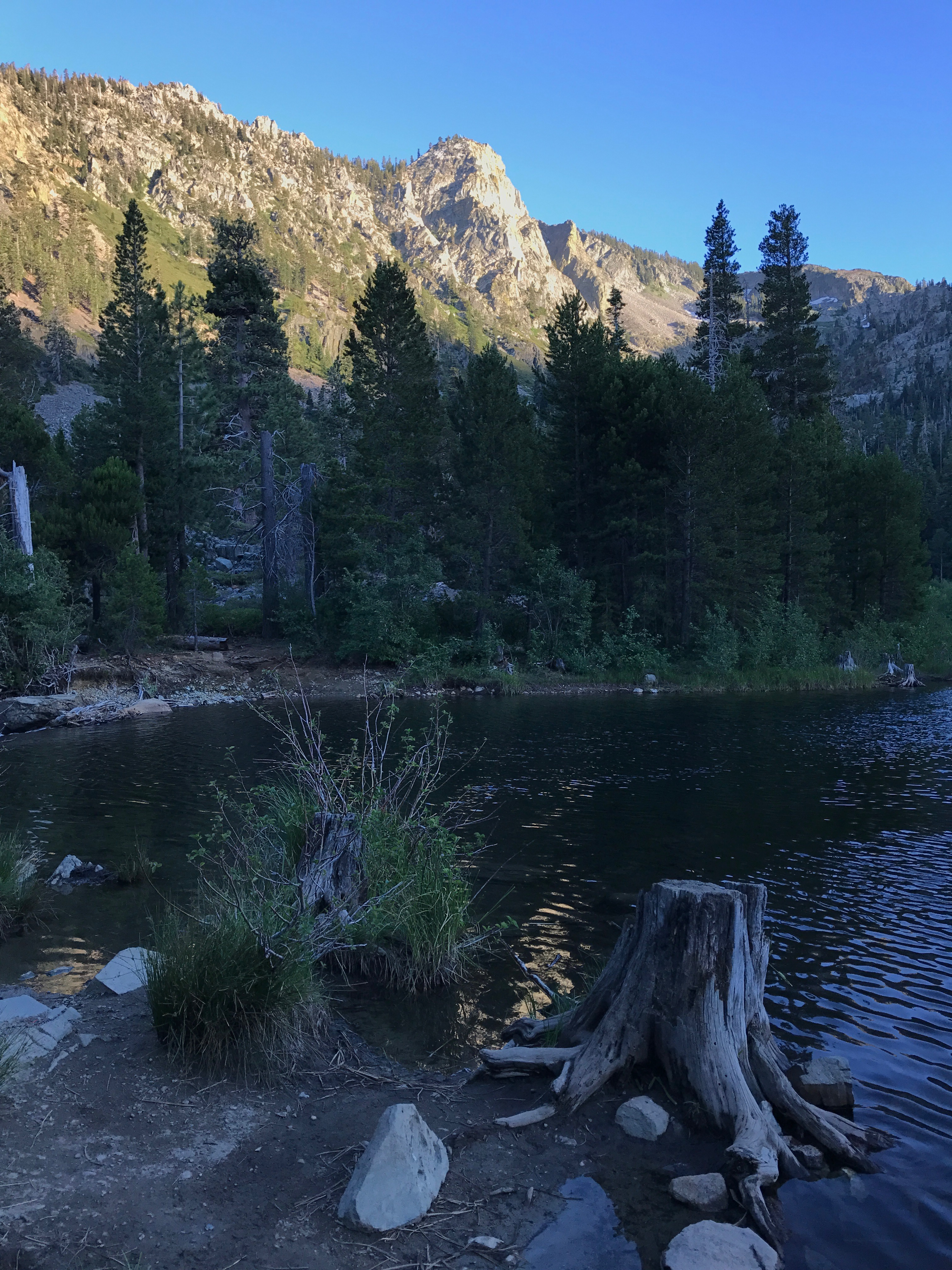

Highest point
- Elevation: 8,588 ft (2,618 m) NGVD 29
- Prominence: 168 ft (51 m)
- Coordinates: 38°52′02″N 120°04′22″W

Geography
- Location within California Location within the United States
- Location: El Dorado County, California, U.S.
- Parent range: Sierra Nevada
- Topo map: USGS Echo Lake

Climbing
- Easiest route: Hike, class 2 to 3

Angora Peak is a summit in the Sierra Nevada south of Lake Tahoe in El Dorado County, California. The summit marks a point on the eastern boundary of the Desolation Wilderness and is in the Eldorado National Forest.

The peak is located south of Fallen Leaf Lake and northwest of the Angora Lakes.
