= Taylor Creek (Lake Tahoe) =

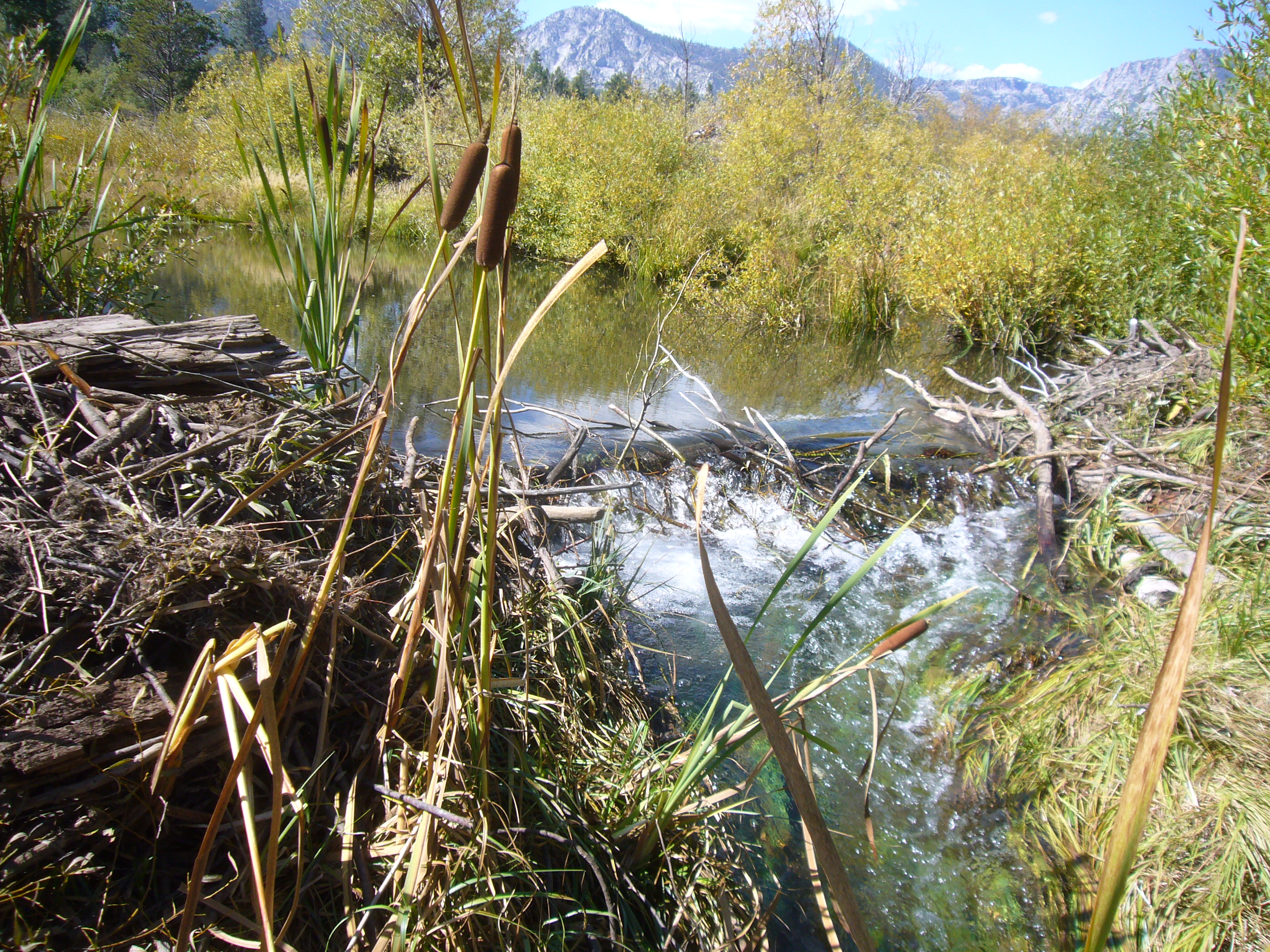
- Beaver dams on Taylor Creek are breached by the Forest Service in anticipation of the October Kokanee salmon spawning run.

- Location of the mouth within California
- Native name: Dawgašašíwa (Washo)

Location
- Country: United States
- State: California
- Region: El Dorado County

Physical characteristics
- Source: Fallen Leaf Lake
  - coordinates: 38°55′14″N 120°03′39″W
  - elevation: 6,337 ft (1,932 m)
- Mouth: Lake Tahoe
  - coordinates: 38°56′26″N 120°03′28″W
  - elevation: 6,237 ft (1,901 m)

Taylor Creek is a 2.2-mile-long (3.5 km) northward-flowing stream originating in the Fallen Leaf Lake and culminating at Baldwin Beach at Lake Tahoe, about 1 mile (1.6 km) west of Camp Richardson in El Dorado County, California.

== History ==
To the Washoe people, Taylor Creek was known as Dawgašašíwa It was a significant Washoe Indian camping and fishing site. Taylor Creek is probably named for Elijah W. Taylor, who homesteaded 160 acres near the creek in 1864.

== Watershed and course ==
Taylor Creek is the only outflow for Fallen Leaf Lake, and begins at a spillway on the Fallen Leaf Lake dam on the north side of the lake. From here it winds its way northwards, entering the Tallac & Taylor Creek wetland before entering Lake Tahoe.

== Habitat and wildlife ==
Taylor and Tallack Creeks form an important wetland complex separate from Lake Tahoe by Baldwin Beach. Historically, these two wetland complexes provided approximately 400 acres of wetland and meadow habitat. The valley between Taylor and Tallac creeks is dissected by a series of east–west historic lagoons (or swales) that created wetland habitat for a variety of native animal and plant species. From historic aerial photos, it appears that these swales may have hydrologically connected Taylor and Tallac creeks and follow topographic features such as historic beaches/lake levels. In addition to man-made alterations, such as an access road that runs north–south in the middle of the wetland, the influx of aquatic invasive species, such as Eurasian watermilfoil (Myriophyllum spicatum), bull frogs and warm-water fishes have invaded both Tallac and Taylor creeks, which now compete with native species such as Lahontan tui chub (Gila bicolor pectinifer), Lahontan redside shiner (Richardsonius egregius), Tahoe sucker (Catostomus tahoensis) and Tahoe yellowcress (Rorippa subumbellata). The wetland is also historic habitat for Sierra Nevada yellow-legged frog, as well as Lahontan cutthroat trout (Oncorhynchus clarki henshawi), a threatened species listed on the Endangered Species Act.

Lahontan cutthroat trout (LCT) is the only trout species native to Fallen Leaf Lake, Lake Tahoe and the Truckee River Basin but were extirpated by introduction of predatory non-native lake trout (Salvelinus namaycush), other competing non-native salmonids, and overfishing. Re-introduction into Fallen Leaf Lake of the Pilot Peak strain of Lahontan cutthroat trout (LCT), established as the LCT strain native to the watershed, began in 2006.

Each autumn, from late September through mid-October, mature kokanee salmon (Oncorhyncus nerka), transform from silver-blue color to a fiery vermilion, and run up Taylor Creek, near South Lake Tahoe. As spawning season approaches the fish acquire a humpback and protuberant jaw. After spawning they die and their carcasses provide a feast for gatherings of mink (Neovison vison), black bears (Ursus americanus), and bald eagles (Haliaeetus leucocephalus). These non-native salmon were translocated from the North Pacific to Lake Tahoe in 1944, and Taylor Creek is their primary spawning stream in the Tahoe basin. Kokanee appear to compete for forage with the recently established threatened Lahontan cutthroat trout in Fallen Leaf Lake.

All of the beaver dams in Taylor Creek, which flows from Fallen Leaf Lake to Lake Tahoe, are destroyed annually each fall by the U. S. Forest Service in order for Kokanee salmon (Oncorhynchus nerka) to spawn. A recent study of Taylor Creek showed that the beaver dam removal decreased wetland habitat, increased stream flow, and increased total phosphorus pollutants entering Lake Tahoe - all factors which negatively impact the clarity of the lake's water.

== Recreation ==
From Memorial Day weekend through October, the Stream Profile Chamber at the Taylor Creek Visitor Center is an opportunity to see the trout and Kokanee salmon of Lake Tahoe up close. It is located on Highway 89 1 mile (1.6 km) west of Camp Richardson on the south shore of Lake Tahoe.

== See also ==
- List of Lake Tahoe inflow streams
- Rivers of California
- Beaver in the Sierra Nevada
