= Nondegradation standard =

In United States agricultural policy, a nondegradation standard is defined in the 2002 Farm Bill provisions establishing the Conservation Security Program (CSP; P.L. 107-171, Sec. 2001) to mean the level of measures required to protect and prevent degradation of 1 or more natural resources, as determined by the Natural Resources Conservation Service. Participating farmers’ conservation security plans must address resources of concern and meet the appropriate nondegradation standard.
