= Stanford Sierra Camp =

Summer camp in California

Coordinates: 38.88512°N 120.07347°W

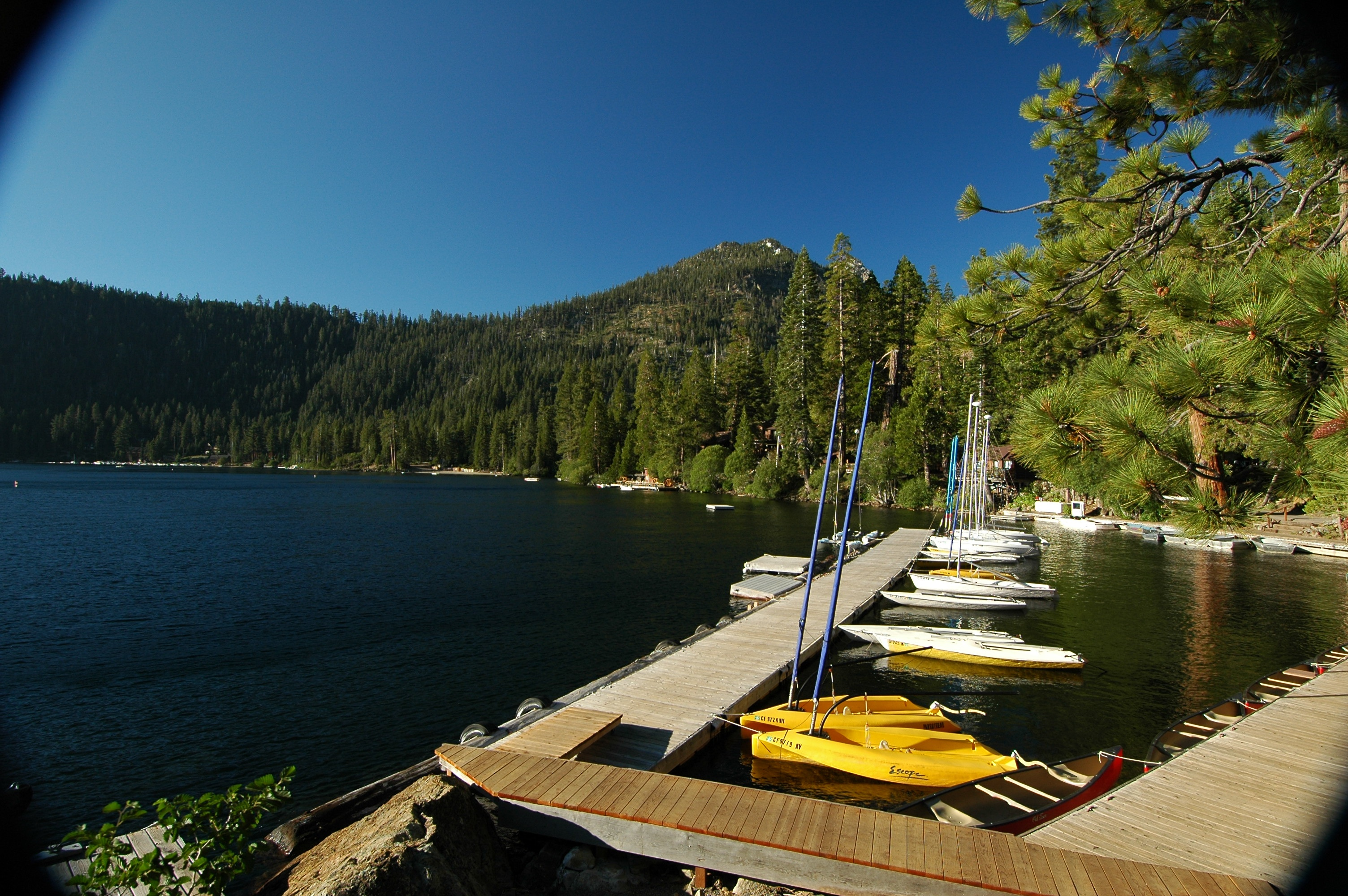
Stanford Sierra Camp on Fallen Leaf Lake

Stanford Sierra Camp is a summer camp primarily attended by Stanford University alumni and their children, and acquaintances, at Fallen Leaf Lake, California. The camp consists of a 20-acre (81,000 m^{2}) lakefront mountain property at 6,300' above sea level and is owned and operated by the Stanford University Alumni Association. Activities include hiking, kayaking on Fallen Leaf Lake, arts and crafts, tennis, volleyball, basketball, swimming, dancing, singing, and dining in the lodges overlooking the lake.

== History ==
The Fallen Leaf Lodge was originally built in 1906 by Stanford alumnus William Wightman Price. The camp was purchased from the Price descendants in 1968 by the Stanford University Alumni Association to become the Stanford Sierra Camp.

Now private, preference is given to both the families of alumni and families that have used the camp in the past. More than 75% of the camp's residents are repeat visitors.

Stanford Sierra camp houses 60 families each week 13 weeks in a row.

== 2007 fire ==
The 2007 Angora Fire destroyed a large area of the nearby wilderness on the other side of Angora ridge. The camp itself was not harmed, and in fact from the camp, evidence of the fire is barely detectable. On the other side of the ridge, many homes as well as forest were devastated by the fire. Several staff members were present at the camp to ensure that the camp would survive, with plans to evacuate via motorboat if needed. Many families were evacuated and stayed at another site in Lake Tahoe owned by the Stanford Alumni Association, The Stanford Chalet.
