= Mount Tallac =

Mountain near Lake Tahoe, California, USA

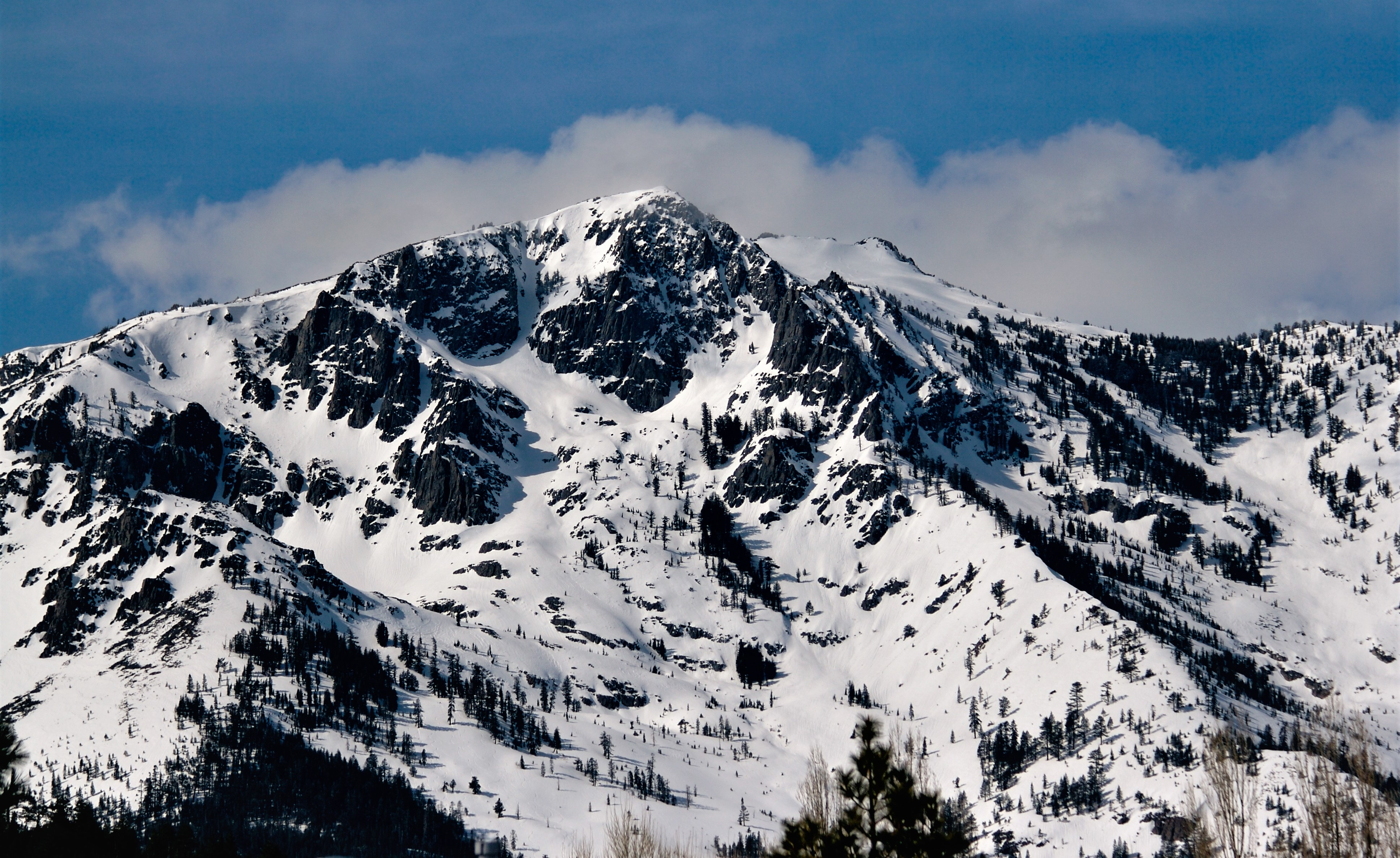
- Northeast aspect

Highest point
- Elevation: 9,739 ft (2,968 m) NAVD 88
- Prominence: 695 ft (212 m)
- Parent peak: Dicks Peak (9,974 ft)
- Isolation: 2.82 mi (4.54 km)
- Listing: Tahoe OGUL Star Peak; Sierra Peaks Section
- Coordinates: 38°54′21.5″N 120°05′56.3″W

Geography
- Location within California
- Location: El Dorado County, California, U.S.
- Parent range: Sierra Nevada
- Topo map: USGS Emerald Bay

Climbing
- Easiest route: Trail hike, class 1-2

Mount Tallac is a mountain peak southwest of Lake Tahoe, in El Dorado County, California. The peak lies within the Desolation Wilderness in the Eldorado National Forest. It is quite visible from State Routes 89 and 28, and U.S. Route 50. A "cross of snow" is clearly visible on the mountain's face during the winter, spring, and early summer months.

The Aetherius Society considers it to be one of its 19 holy mountains.

== History ==
The mountain is shown on maps of the Whitney Survey as Chrystal Peak. In 1877, the Wheeler Survey named the peak "Tallac", after the Washo word "daláʔak", meaning 'big mountain'.

== Access ==
An estimated 10,000 climb the peak each year via routes approaching the summit from Desolation Wilderness to the west, Fallen Leaf Lake to the East, and access roads from the north. Wilderness permits are required to hike Mount Tallac. For day hikes, permits are free and self-issued at the trailhead. There is a quota for overnight hikes on Mount Tallac (and throughout Desolation Wilderness), but there is no quota for day hiking.

== Climate ==
Mount Tallac is located in an alpine climate zone. Most weather fronts originate in the Pacific Ocean, and travel east toward the Sierra Nevada mountains. As fronts approach, they are forced upward by the peaks (orographic lift), causing them to drop their moisture in the form of rain or snowfall onto the range.

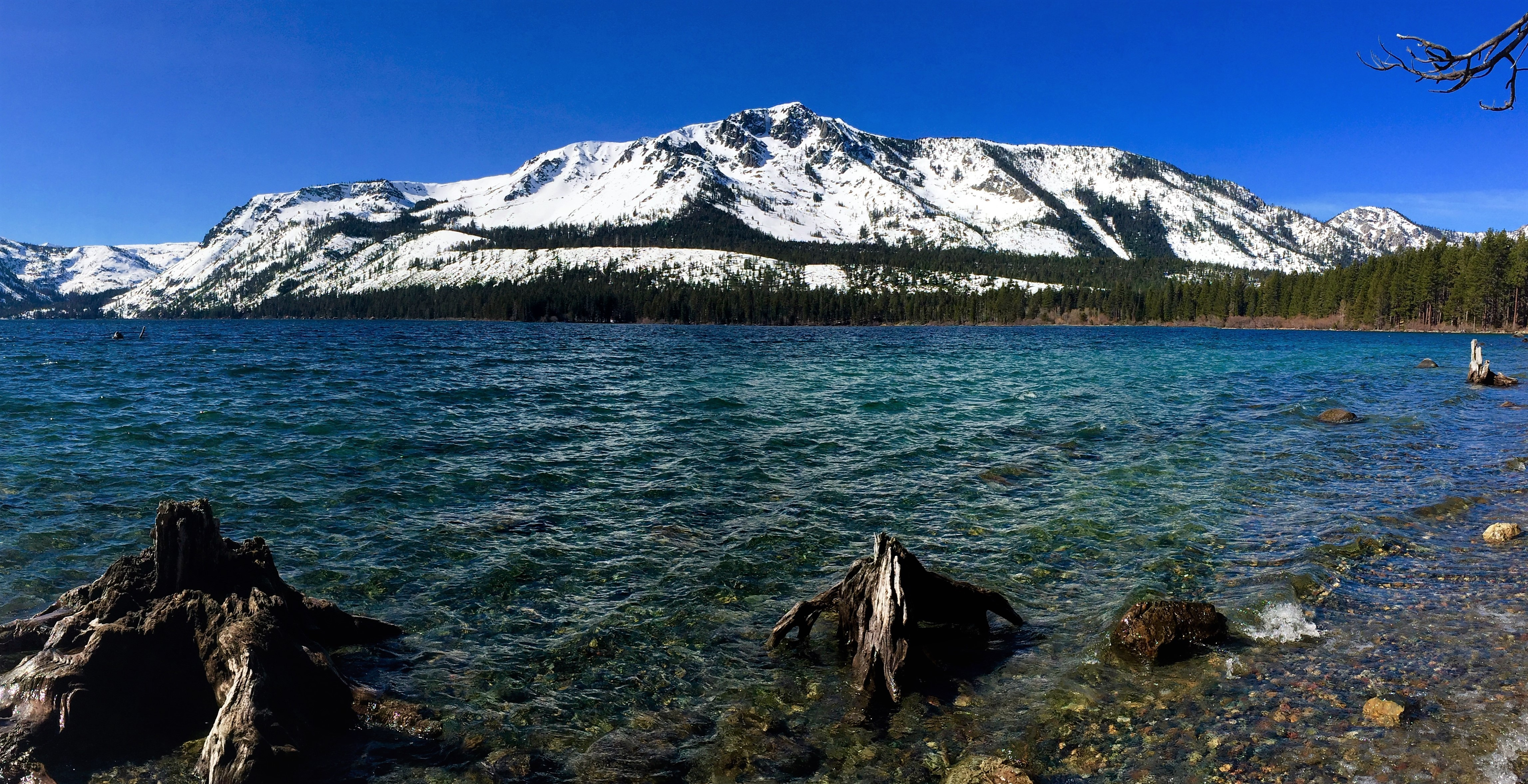
Fallen Leaf Lake and Mt. Tallac

== In popular culture ==
The opening sequence of the TV series Bonanza was filmed at the McFaul Creek Meadow, with Mount Tallac in the background.
