= Echo Peak =

Mountain in the American state of California

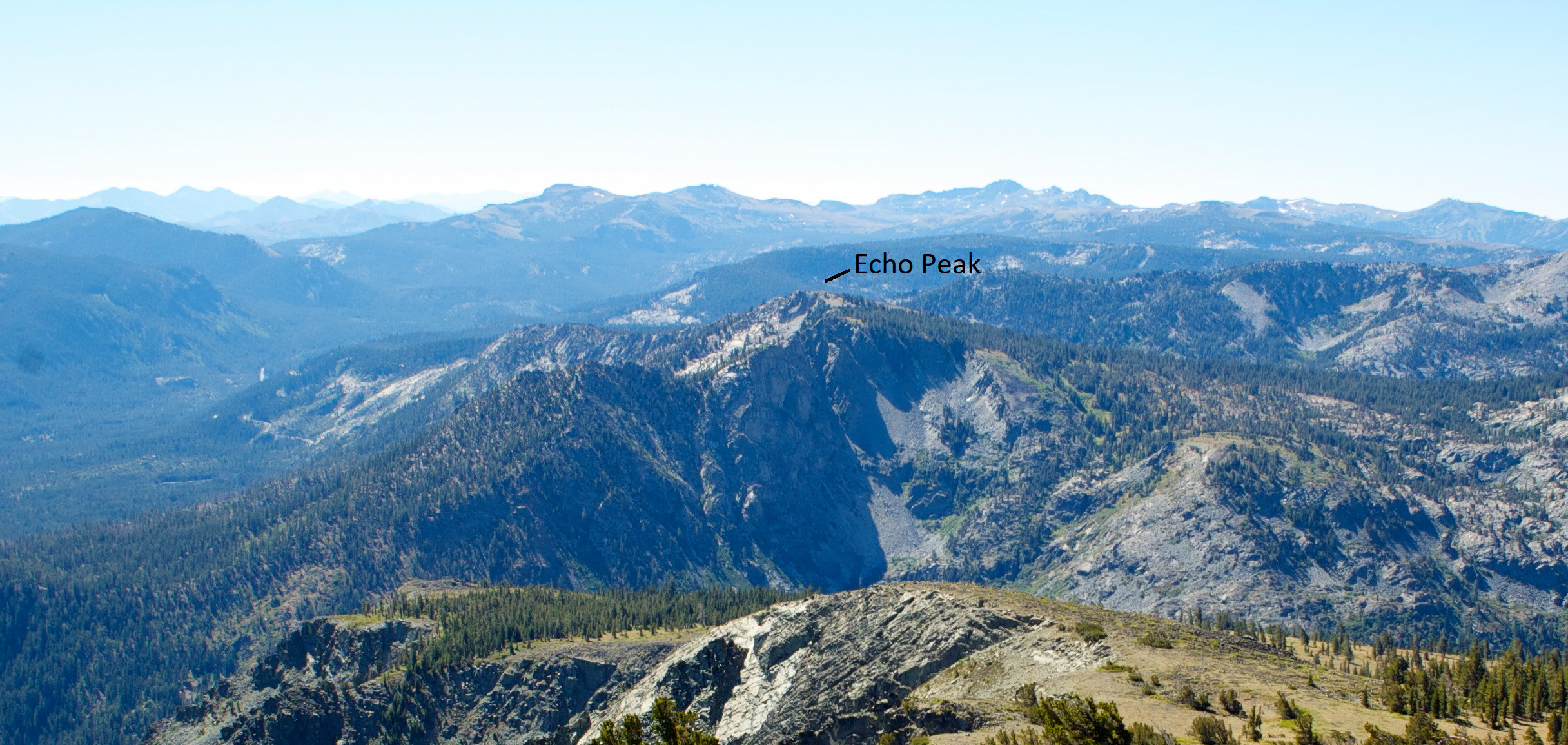

Highest point
- Elevation: 8,899 ft (2,712 m) NAVD 88
- Prominence: 695 ft (212 m)
- Coordinates: 38°51′24″N 120°04′23″W

Geography
- Location within California
- Location: El Dorado County, California. U.S.
- Parent range: Sierra Nevada

Climbing
- Easiest route: Hike, class 1-2

Echo Peak is a mountain in the Sierra Nevada range to the west of Lake Tahoe on the border of the Desolation Wilderness in El Dorado County, California.

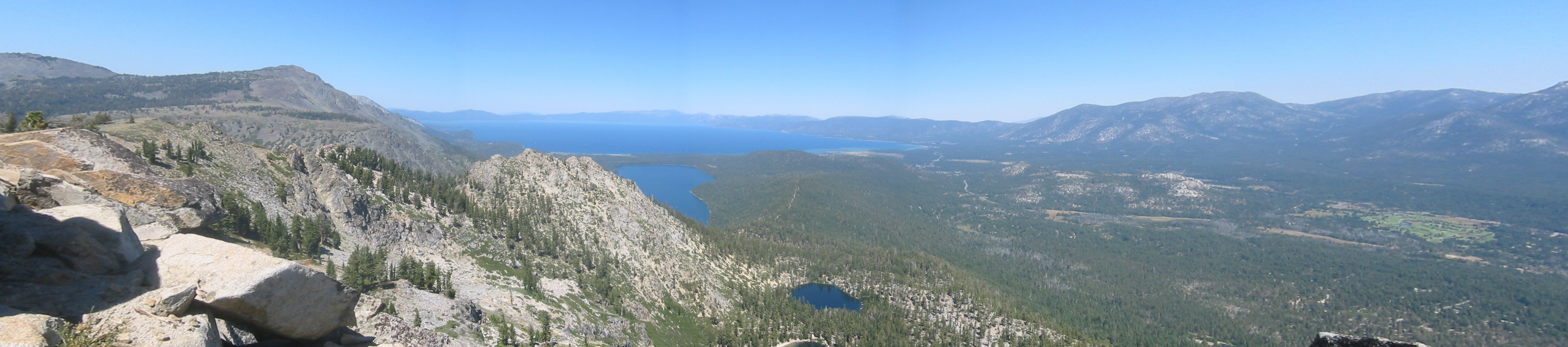
View from Echo Peak summit
