= Fallen Leaf Lake =

Lake in the state of California, United States

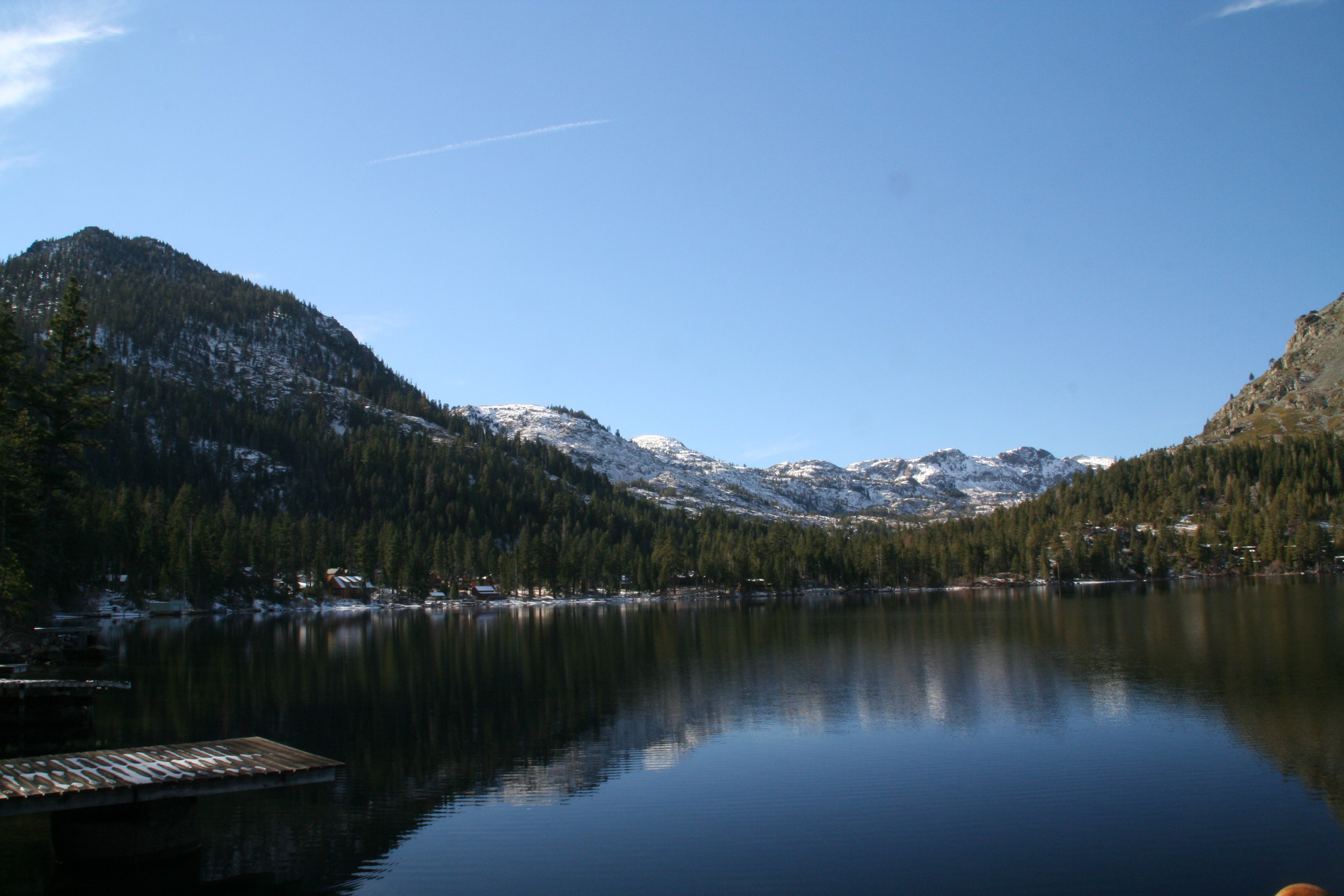
- Fallen Leaf Lake in winter

- Location within California Location within the United States
- Location: El Dorado County, California
- Coordinates: 38.92°N 120.06°W
- Primary inflows: Glen Alpine Creek
- Primary outflows: Taylor Creek
- Basin countries: United States
- Max. length: 2.9 m (9 ft 6 in)
- Max. width: 1.0 m (3 ft 3 in)
- Max. depth: 381 ft (116 m)
- Surface elevation: 6,377 ft (1,944 m)

Fallen Leaf Lake is a mountain lake located in El Dorado County, California, near the California–Nevada state line, about one mile south west of the much larger Lake Tahoe. It is approximately aligned north-to-south and oval in shape, measuring approximately 2.9 miles (4.6 km) on the long axis and 0.9 miles (1.4 km) on the short axis. The lake was created by at least two glaciers that traveled northward down the Glen Alpine Valley. If the glacier had continued instead of stopping, Fallen Leaf Lake would be a bay of Lake Tahoe, similar to nearby Emerald Bay. A terminal moraine is visible at the north end of the lake on the northeast edge.

== Surrounding land ==
Fallen Leaf Lake is located within the National Forest System lands managed by the Lake Tahoe Basin Management Unit, adjacent to El Dorado County. The land surrounding the lake is privately owned, leased from the U.S. Forest Service, and part of the Lake Tahoe Basin Management Unit. Like some areas where the Forest Service has leased land intermingled with private land, the two land types appear in a mosaic or checkerboard pattern.

== Access ==
Fallen Leaf Road is approximately 5 miles (8 km) long, and begins at State Route 89, which runs along the south shore of Lake Tahoe. The road intersects the highway approximately half a mile (800 m) west of Camp Richardson, a resort and campground on the southern shore of Lake Tahoe. The road runs generally to the south, is one lane wide and paved, and has turnouts to allow cars to pass each other. The road passes the Fallen Leaf Lake Campground, operated by the Forest Service, and then past privately owned meadows. Two miles south of State Route 89, Angora Road provides access to Angora Lookout, a Forest Service fire lookout on the east side of the lake and approximately 1,000 feet (300 m) above the lake's surface, and to Angora Lakes Resort. It also connects to US 50/SR 89 via Sawmill Road.

Fallen Leaf Road continues south past privately owned homes following the lakeshore. Emigrant Road connects to Fallen Leaf Road approximately three miles from SR 89, and provides access to houses above the lake on the eastern slope. There is little commercial development at the lake other than the tiny Fallen Leaf Marina and Store at the southern extremity of the lake. The road winds around the south end of the lake, past St. Francis of the Mountains, an Episcopalian chapel, and then across a concrete bridge spanning Glen Alpine Creek. Glen Alpine Road begins at the bridge and runs for about two miles southwest to Glen Alpine Springs, one of the trailheads to the Desolation Wilderness Area. Fallen Leaf Road itself continues northwesterly along the west side of the lake past the Stanford Sierra Camp.

Cathedral Road also intersects State Route 89, and travels south to the houses on the west side of the lake. While it runs to within about three-quarters of a mile (1.2 km) of Fallen Leaf Road, the two roads do not connect. Some of the homes on the west side of the lake have no road access and are accessed on foot or by boat.

== Tributaries ==
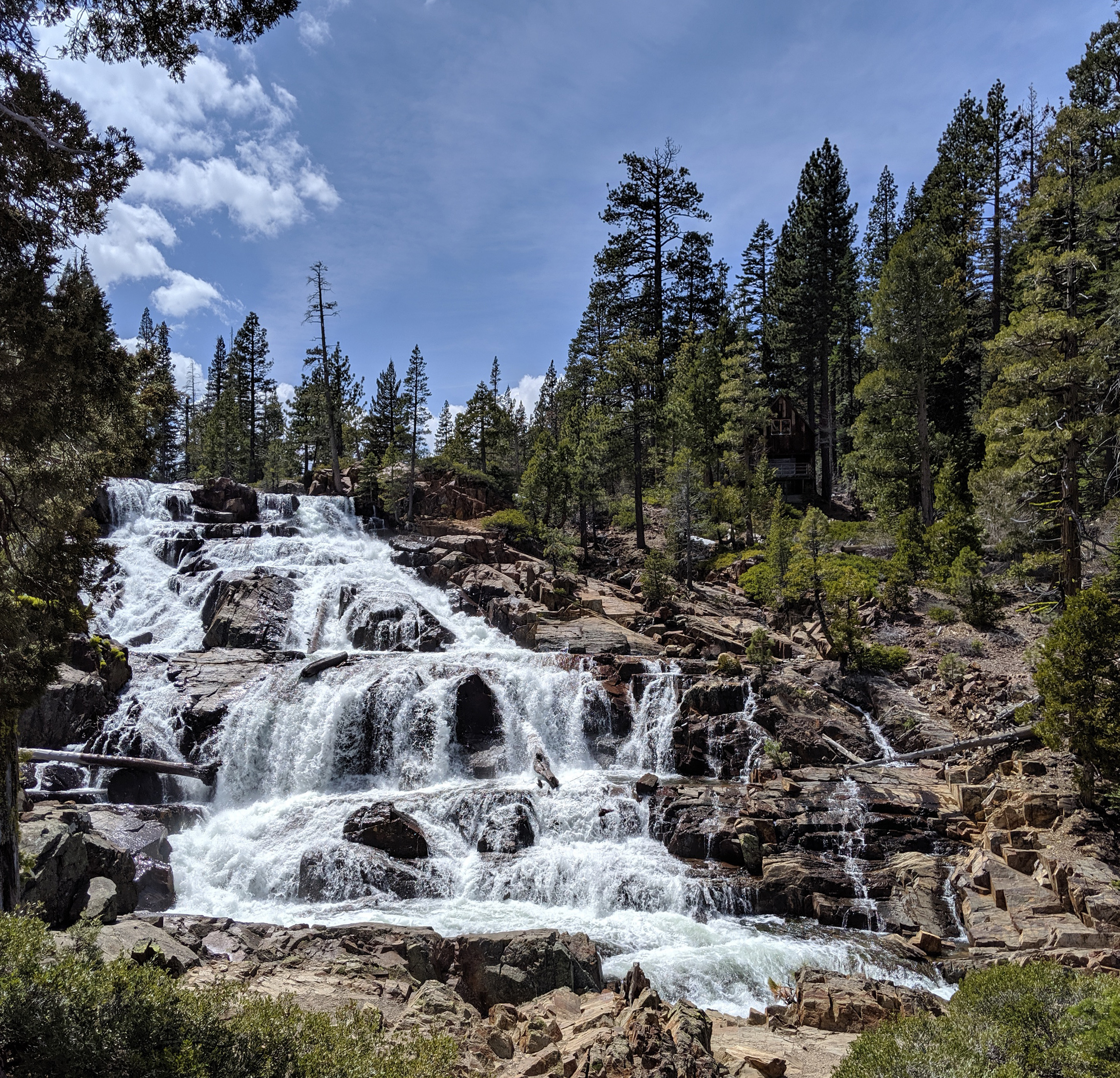
Glen Alpine Falls on Glen Alpine Creek, a short walk from Fallen Leaf Lake, with strong runoff in May 2019

Fallen Leaf Lake is fed almost entirely by Glen Alpine Creek at the south end, which is in turn fed by several lakes in the Desolation Wilderness area including Gilmore Lake, Susie Lake, Heather Lake, and Grass Lake. In the spring, melting snow causes a vigorous flow of cold water into the lake which gradually tapers off during the summer months until the creek flow is greatly reduced in late summer and the fall. Other much smaller creeks and streams feed the lake, including Cathedral Creek, but they are not nearly as important as Glen Alpine Creek.

Taylor Creek is the only outflow, and it is controlled by a long, low concrete dam with an adjustable spillway to control the rate at which the water leaves the lake. This dam is 12 ft (3.7 m) high and 265 ft (81 m) in length. Taylor Creek flows northward, passing under State Route 89, and enters Lake Tahoe at Baldwin Beach.

== The lake ==
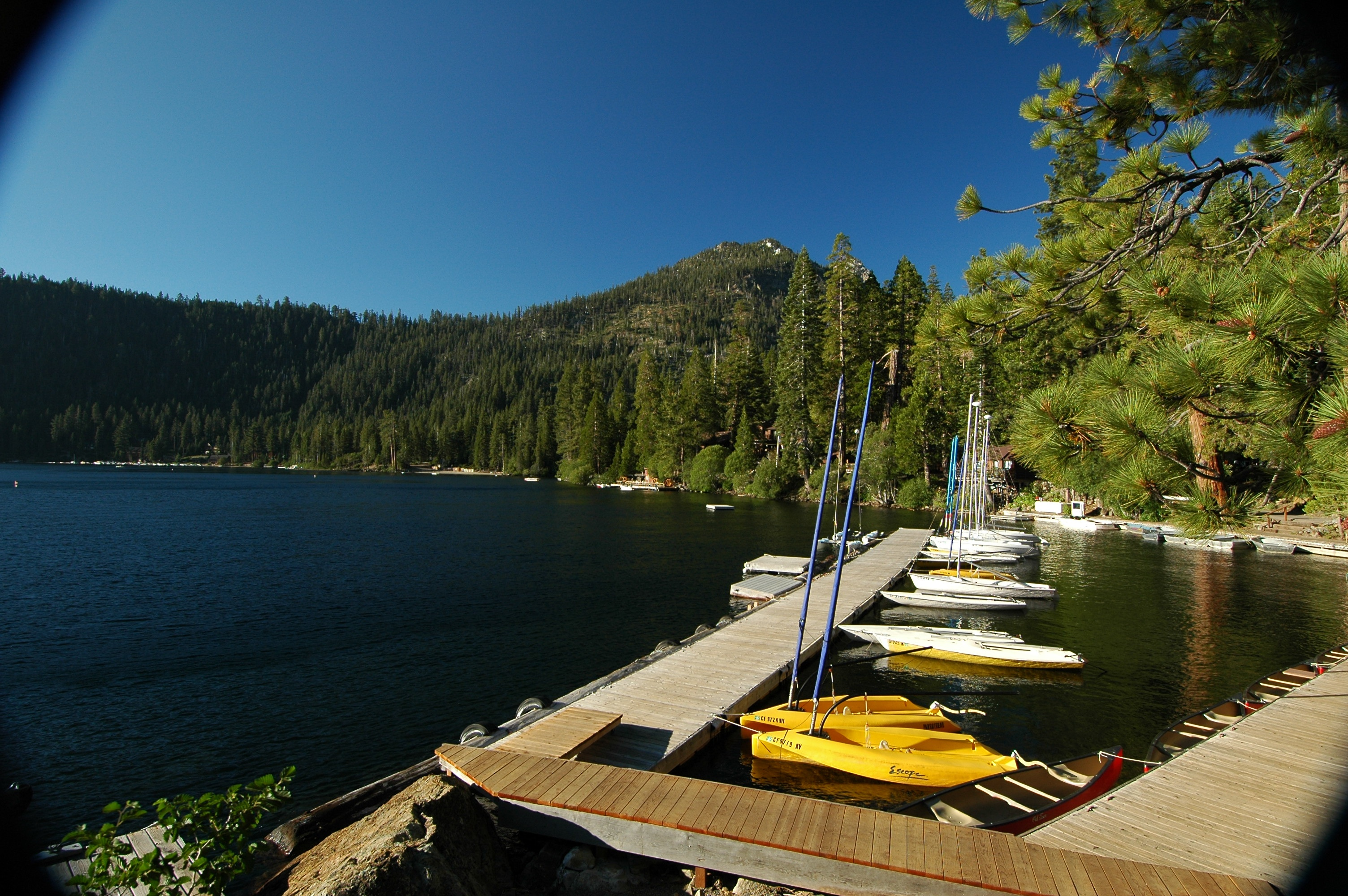
Stanford Sierra Camp on the calm waters of Fallen Leaf Lake

Fallen Leaf is approximately 381 feet (116 m) deep at its deepest point, which is at the south end, east of the sheer face of Mount Tallac and north of Stanford Sierra Camp. The average depth of the lake is around 240 feet (72 m), and the bottom falls away rapidly as one moves away from the shorelines at the southern end. Due to the action of the glaciers that carved the lake, the northern end of the lake has a much more gradual depth change, and the bottom can be seen from the surface for a quarter-mile (400 m) offshore. Along other shores, the bottom may be hidden in as little as 100 feet (30 m) offshore.

The water quality is extremely good due to the lack of commercial development (including golf courses and their fertilizer-rich runoff), the universal use of sewers, and modern sediment retention techniques associated with new development. Visibility runs around 40–50 feet (10–15 m) under most conditions. The water is potable, and many homes along the shoreline run a pipe offshore to provide water during the winter when other water systems may be turned off.

The water in the lake is exchanged every eight years, compared to the much deeper, therefore slower, Lake Tahoe, which exchanges every 700 years.

The surface elevation of the lake is 152 feet (46 m) above Lake Tahoe.

Mature conifer trees can be found on the bottom of Fallen Leaf Lake, preserved for some 800 years by the cold water. Some scientists believe that these trees show evidence of a so-called "megadrought" occurring between the 9th and 12th centuries that eliminated or reduced the lake, allowing conifers to grow to maturity. Even older trees have been identified by dendrologists dating to between 18 and 35 centuries ago. A recent expedition by the Undersea Voyager Project concluded that the ancient trees did not grow there during an ancient drought, but rather slid into the lake during one of the many seismic events that have occurred in the Tahoe Basin since it was formed.

After the Tahoe Regional Planning Agency banned two-stroke outboard boat motors in the late 1990s, pollution from these engines was virtually eliminated.

== Local terrain ==
As the glaciers receded from the Fallen Leaf basin, they left some dramatic rock formations including Cathedral Peak to the west, and the ridge upon which the Angora Lookout is located on the east (now forested). Cathedral Peak (8,200 feet (2,500 m)) might be better named Cathedral Ridge since, while it appears to be a solitary peak from the vantage point on the lake, it is really the beginning of a ridge that leads in the direction of Gilmore Lake and Mount Tallac. Incidentally, Mount Tallac (9,735 ft (2,967 m)) is familiar to anyone who was a fan of the television series Bonanza as it appeared with its characteristic cross of snow behind the Cartwright family as they rode toward the camera.

Cathedral Peak does not have a trail that leads directly to it, but can be reached by three different approaches. The Middle Trail to Tallac is a trail that begins near Lily Lake and which runs along the northern side of Glen Alpine Valley. It runs up to a junction which splits off to Gilmore Lake and Mount Tallac. Intrepid hikers can set off cross-country in the general direction of Cathedral Peak, about half a mile (800 m) away. Another route is from Gilmore Lake, to the same junction. Finally, the Lake Trail begins at the end of Fallen Leaf Road and slowly climbs up to Cathedral Lake and Floating Island Lake, and eventually to the Mount Tallac trail.

== Ecology ==
Lahontan cutthroat trout (Oncorhynchus clarkii henshawi) is the only trout species native to Fallen Leaf Lake, Lake Tahoe and the Truckee River Basin but were extirpated by introduction of predatory non-native lake trout (Salvelinus namaycush), other competing non-native salmonids, and overfishing. Re-introduction into Fallen Leaf Lake of the Pilot Peak strain of Lahontan cutthroat trout (LCT), established as the LCT strain native to the watershed, began in 2006. This strain grows larger than any other LCT subspecies. Although the LCT suffer from heavy predation by lake trout, interbreeding with non-native rainbow trout (Oncorhynchus mykiss), and foraging competition with non-native kokanee salmon (Oncorhynchus nerka), their population is gradually increasing in the lake.

== Water activities ==
Most homes that have lake front property have docks or boathouses, generally with an older ski boat or a 16–20 feet (5–7 m) sailboat. The marina has room for approximately 60 boats, many of which are owned by property owners without direct access to the water. Wakeboard and waterski boats are the most common, followed by dedicated fishing boats, a few sailboats and pontoon boats, and some manually propelled craft. Kayaking is becoming more popular, as is recreational rowing.

Fishing is popular, if not particularly productive, for brown trout, rainbow trout and lake trout. The Forest Service stocks the lake and Glen Alpine Creek, which improves anglers' odds. The lake has also seen what appears to be a successful reintroduction of the Lahontan cutthroat trout, which were fished to extinction in the Lake Tahoe area in the twenties and thirties.

Sailing is challenging on the lake due to the shifty and gusty winds. The prevailing winds can either be southerlies from Glen Alpine Valley, or northerlies from Lake Tahoe. Sailors must contend with occasionally strong gusts, and the water temperature is not amenable to capsizes.

== Notable people ==
Families that have, or have had, residences at Fallen Leaf Lake:

- Elias Jackson "Lucky" Baldwin (1828–1909) – pioneer of early California business
- Bruce Dern – Academy Award winning actor and father of Academy Award winner Laura Dern
- Alex Gansa – Emmy Award winning television writer and producer
- Bill Green – former U.S. and NCAA record holder in Track and Field, 5th Place in the Hammer Throw in the 1984 Olympic Games
- MC Lars – rapper and producer who worked at Stanford Sierra Camp
- Robert Mondavi (1913–2008) – American winemaker
- David Packard (1912–1996) – industrialist, co-founder of Hewlett-Packard
- Charles de Young Family (Richard Tobin Thieriot 1942-2024, great grandson), co-founder of the San Francisco Chronicle. Richard Thieriot was the editor of the newspaper from 1977 to 1993.
- John Steinbeck (1902–1968) – Pulitzer Prize winning author, employed at the Fallen Leaf Lodge in the late 1920s

== See also ==
- Angora Fire, a 2007 wildfire near the lake
- List of lakes in California
- The Bodyguard, a 1992 film location for the cabin scene
- City of Angels, a 1998 film location for the cabin scene
