= Angora Fire =

2007 wildfire in Northern California

- Part of the 2007 California wildfires
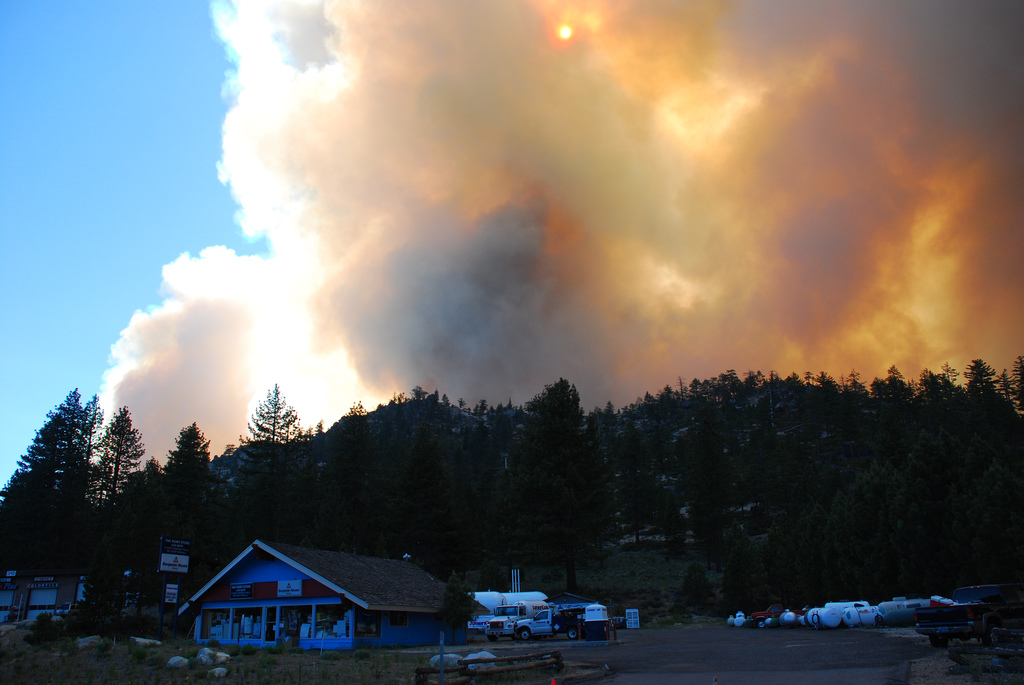
- The Angora Fire approaches a local business
- Date: June 24, 2007 –; July 2, 2007
- Location: South Lake Tahoe, California
- Coordinates: 38.863°N 120.05°W

Statistics
- Burned area: 3,100 acres (1,255 ha; 5 sq mi; 13 km^{2})

Impacts
- Deaths: 0
- Injuries: 3
- Evacuated: ~3,500
- Structures destroyed: 280
- Cost: >$163.5 million; (equivalent to about $237.6 million in 2024)

Ignition
- Cause: Illegal campfire

Map
- The general location of the fire in Northern California

The Angora Fire was a 2007 wind-driven wildfire in El Dorado County, California. It started near North Upper Truckee Road subdivision near Angora Lakes, Fallen Leaf Lake, Echo Lake and South Lake Tahoe, California around 2:15 p.m. on Sunday, June 24, 2007, as a result of an illegal campfire. On July 2, 2007, the fire was 100 percent contained, and 100 percent control (all interior fires extinguished) was achieved on July 10. The fire burned 3,100 acres (12.5 km^{2}), destroyed 242 residences and 67 commercial structures, and damaged 35 other homes. At the peak of the fire, there were as many as 2,180 firefighters involved in battling the blaze. The fire cost $13.5 million to fight and caused at least $150 million in property damage.

== Background ==
Prior to European settlement of the Lake Tahoe area in the mid-1800s, a "natural cycle of low-intensity fires"—ignited both by lightning and by the indigenous Washoe people—prevailed. Vigorous wildfire suppression policies adopted by the U.S. federal government in the early 20th century, aimed at preserving timber and property, ended that fire pattern. Between 1908 and 2004, no wildfire burned more than 2,000 acres (810 ha) in the Lake Tahoe basin. Additionally, clearcutting and subsequent regrowth in the basin led to an "unnaturally thick and even-aged" forest in the basin. With these abundant fuels, the area became vulnerable to high-intensity wildfires.

In addition to strong winds, the fire was also fueled by unusually dry conditions in the Sierra Nevada (U.S.). A study concluded that snow pack was 29% of average in 2007.

== Progression ==
The Angora Fire ignited at about 2:00 p.m. PDT, 300–400 yards (270–370 m) south of Seneca Pond, a popular recreation area. Golfers at a course less than three miles (4.8 km) from the fire first reported it at 2:02 p.m., though the Reno Gazette-Journal reported that people saw smoke as early as 1:30 p.m. At least five calls to 911 about the smoke were routed to the California Highway Patrol field office in Truckee, where two dispatchers dismissed the reports and told callers they were seeing smoke from a controlled burn. There were no such burns scheduled that day, or during the week prior, because of how dry conditions were. The dispatchers' dismissals caused an estimated seven to nine-minute delay in the response time.

Meanwhile, the fire, which had originated in a thicket of fir and pine trees, rapidly became a crown fire. It was then driven northeast down Angora Creek by the strong winds.

Many neighborhoods were evacuated immediately, giving only very short warning to residents, sometimes as short as 5 minutes. After an hour of burning, soot began to fall from the sky around the Tahoe Keys area. People flocked to head towards the source, but the firefighters blockaded the road near the high school. A day after the fire started, the state of California declared it a state of emergency, opening up state funds.

On June 26 at about 3:00 p.m., the fire breached containment lines on its northern perimeter south of Highway 89. The renewed fire activity threatened several hundred homes and forced a rapid round of re-evacuations.

The Angora Fire was declared 100 percent contained on Monday, July 2, 2007. Per the U.S. Forest Service, the final cost of the firefighting effort reached $13.5 million (roughly equivalent to $19.6 million in 2024).

== Cause ==
Within several days, Forest Service fire investigators determined that a campfire in the Seneca Pond recreation area had been the point of ignition for the Angora Fire. The fire did not appear to have been set with malicious intent; investigators found no traces of accelerant. However, campfires were prohibited in the Seneca Pond area year-round, making the original fire illegal in any case. At the time, investigators had no suspects. In 2009—two years after the Angora Fire—investigators with the El Dorado County district attorney's office reported that they continued to follow up on leads and that the case remained a high priority, while reiterating that the likely cause remained leftover embers from a campfire.

== Effects ==
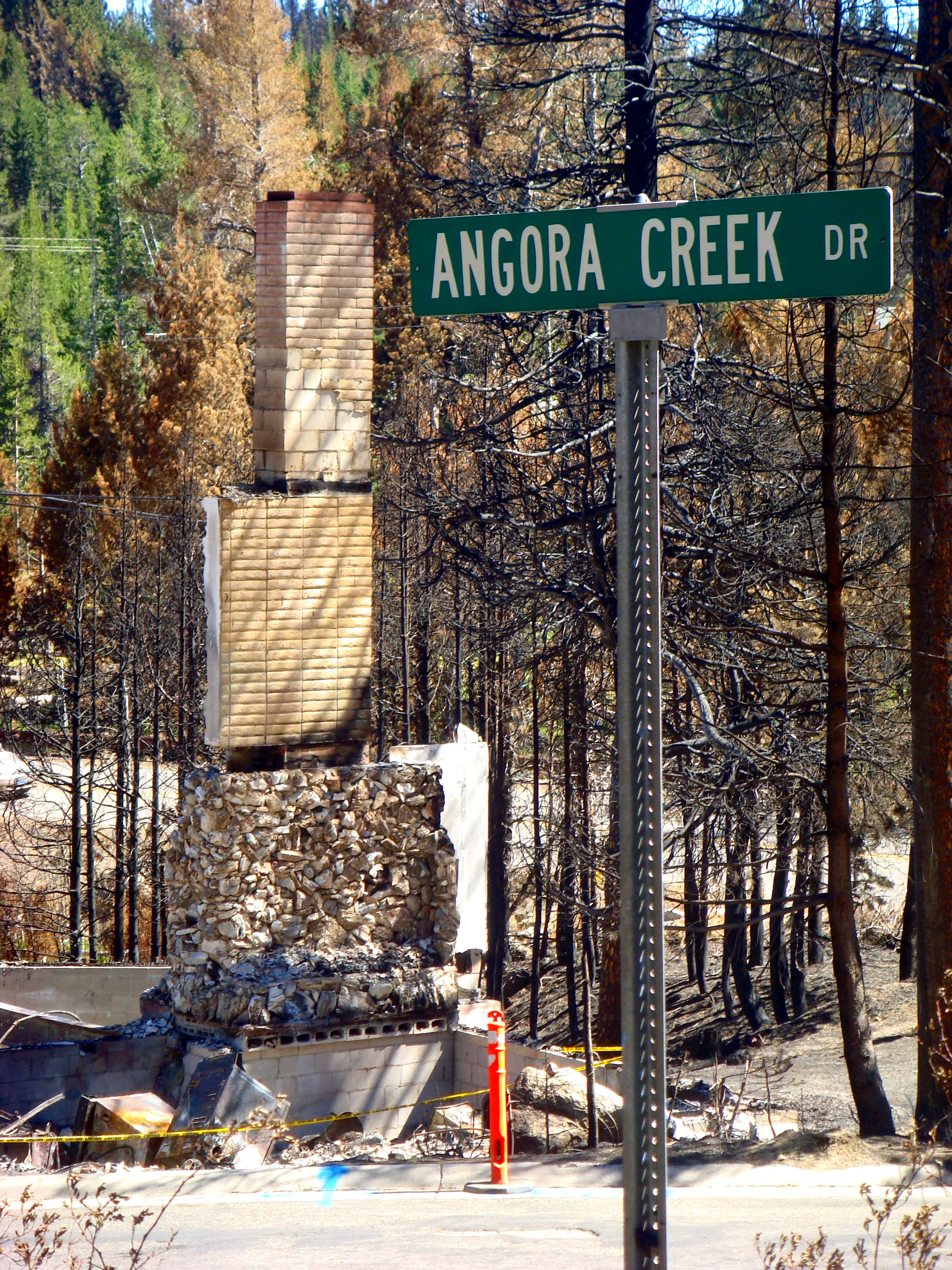
A destroyed home on Angora Creek Drive

The Angora Fire destroyed 254 homes and 75 other structures (such as commercial buildings or outbuildings) for a total toll of 329 buildings. The El Dorado County Sheriff's Office initially estimated the cost of structural damage (i.e. not including damage to infrastructure) from the Angora Fire at $141 million. California Insurance Commissioner Steve Poizner later gave a total damages estimate of more than $150 million.

The maximum number of people under evacuation orders reached approximately 3,500.

The fire caused no fatalities. Three firefighters sustained minor injuries.

The delay in the response to the fire caused by the CHP dispatchers' dismissals of early smoke reports led to the reassignment of said dispatchers and responses by multiple local and state officials. The governor of California, Arnold Schwarzenegger, expressed concerns about the blunder. The mayor of South Lake Tahoe and at least one California State Assembly member argued for changes to the 911 system to route calls directly to county first responders.

=== Environmental impacts ===
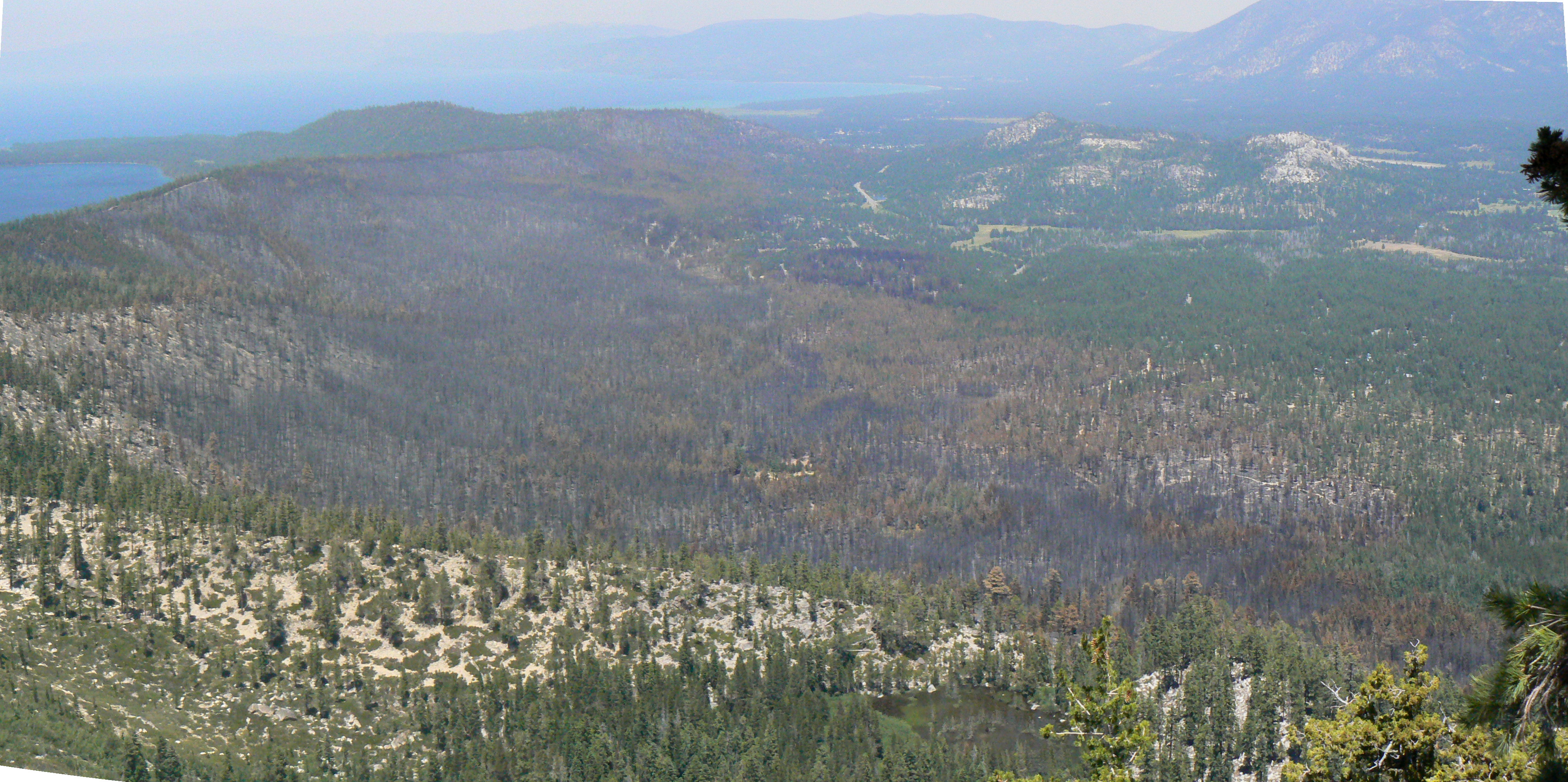
View of Angora Fire area from Flagpole Peak, next to Echo Lake

Because the fire occurred in the watershed of Lake Tahoe, one of the primary concerns once the fire was out was the potential impact of the ash and debris on the Lake Tahoe hydrological system. Of major concern was the potentially hazardous debris from the 256 structures that were burned in the fire. To address this, the Governor issued Executive Order S-09-07 which initiated a major debris removal project to remove the structural debris as quickly and safely as possible from the 250+ private properties affected by the fire. The debris removal was operationally conducted by the California Integrated Waste Management Board on behalf of El Dorado County. Debris removal activities commenced on July 12, 2007, and was completed by the end of August. Work continues on erosion control measures and removal of potentially hazardous trees. No significant long-term ecological damage is believed to have occurred.

Sierra Pacific Industries removed the burned trees in the fire footprint for lumber via salvage logging. By 2017, 1,100 acres (450 ha) of the Angora Fire burn area had been replanted and 2,000 feet (610 m) of stream channels had been repaired.
