= Mount Abbot =

Mountain in Sierra Nevada range, California, US

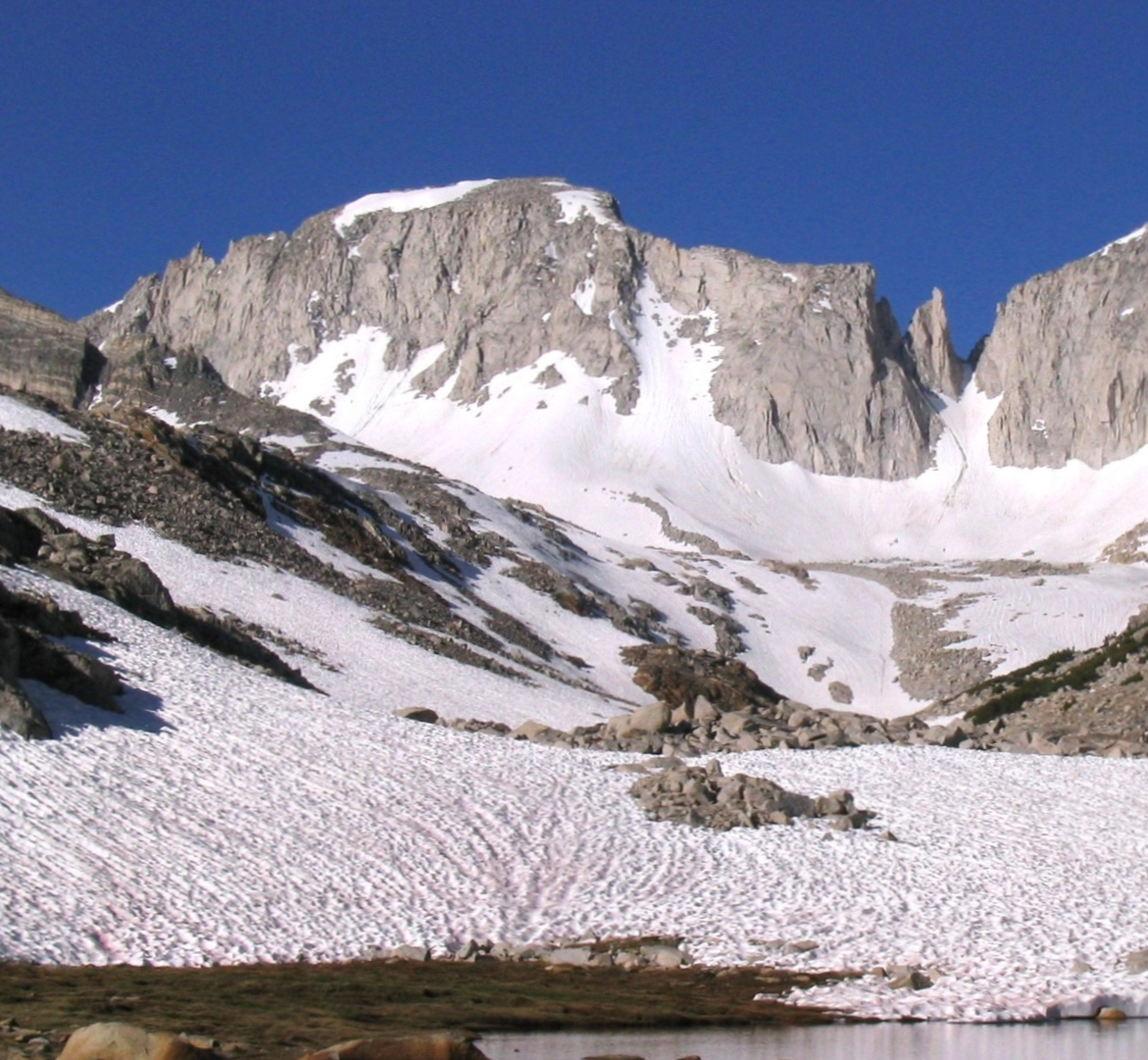
- Mount Abbot, showing the north couloir. Petit Griffon is the gendarme on the right.

Highest point
- Elevation: 13,710 ft (4,180 m) NAVD 88
- Prominence: 864 ft (263 m)
- Listing: SPS Emblem peak; Western States Climbers Star peak
- Coordinates: 37°23′11″N 118°47′05″W

Geography
- Location within California Location within the United States
- Location: Fresno / Inyo counties, California, U.S.
- Parent range: Sierra Nevada
- Topo map: USGS Mount Abbot

Climbing
- First ascent: July 13, 1908 by Joseph N. Le Conte, James S. Hutchinson & Duncan McDuffie
- Easiest route: Exposed scramble, class 3

Mount Abbot is a mountain in California's Sierra Nevada, in the John Muir Wilderness. It is located between Mount Mills and Mount Dade along the Sierra Crest and straddles the border between Fresno and Inyo counties.

The peak was named for Henry Larcom Abbot who, in 1855, was a member of the Williamson party of the Pacific Railroad Surveys in California and Oregon. He retired from the United States Army as a brigadier general in 1904.

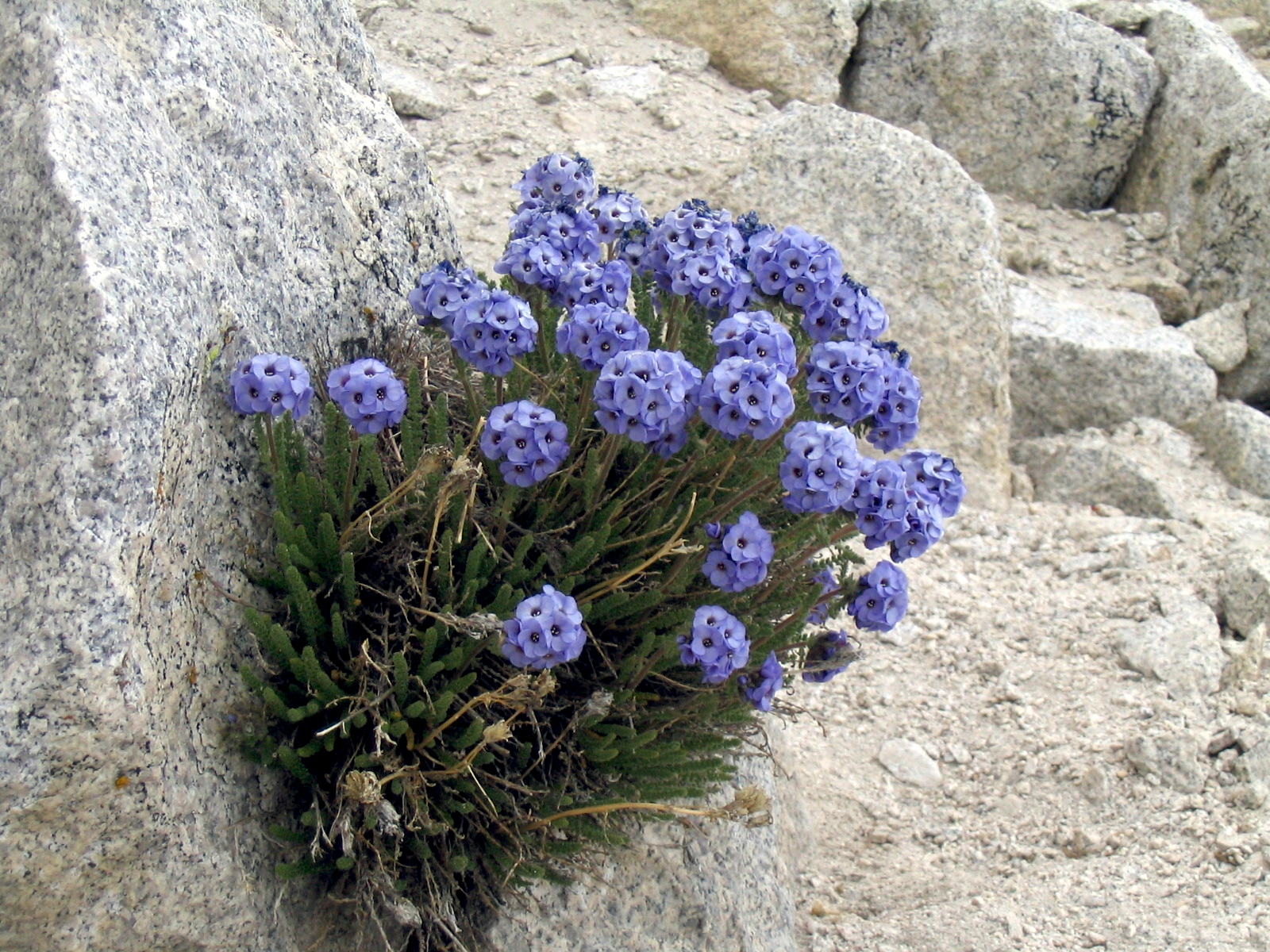
Sky pilot on Mount Abbot at about 13,000 feet

== See also ==
- California 4000 meter peaks
- Thirteener
