= Duncan McDuffie =

American architect

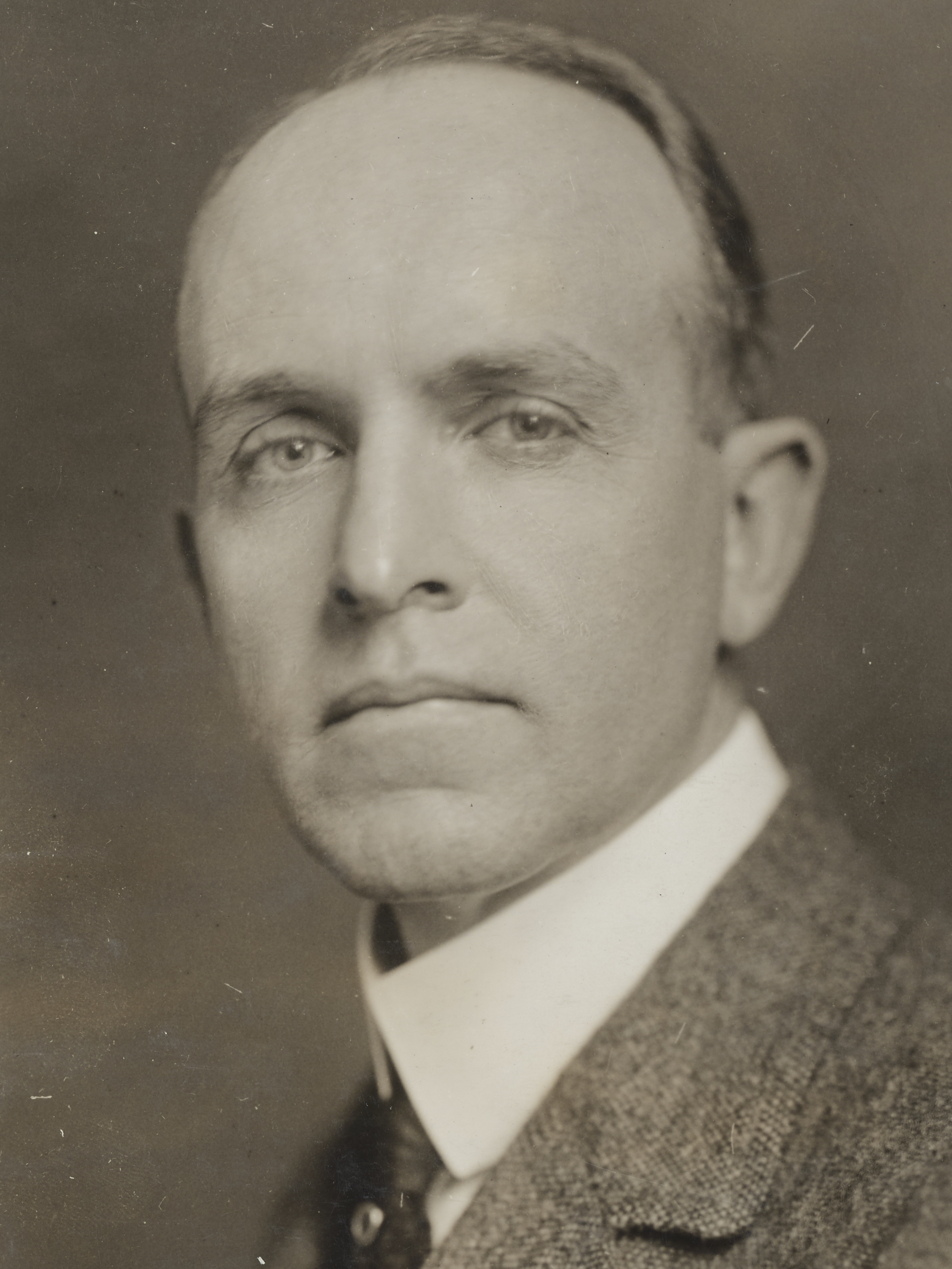
Duncan McDuffie (about 1917) as a member of the United States Food Administration

Duncan McDuffie (September 24, 1877 – 1951) was a real estate developer, conservationist, and mountaineer based in Berkeley, California, United States.

== Developer ==
McDuffie is best known for developing the Claremont and Northbrae neighborhoods of Berkeley and St. Francis Wood district in San Francisco. His upscale developments were laid out as "residential parks," with streets following the contours of hills and underground power lines. Like many other developments at the time, his developments included racial covenants to exclude non-whites from home ownership, and he also promoted single-family zoning laws to exclude non-whites.

== Conservationist ==
McDuffie was a notable conservationist, and was president of the Sierra Club from 1928 to 1931 and 1943–1946.

=== East Bay Regional Park District ===
In 1934 McDuffie helped create the East Bay Regional Park District in the Berkeley Hills.

=== California state parks ===
McDuffie helped establish the California state park system with the help of his friend Governor C. C. Young. He won the Pugsley Medal for his service on the California State Parks Commission.

== Mountaineer ==
McDuffie was an accomplished mountaineer in the Sierra Nevada, and made first ascents of Mount Abbot and Black Kaweah.

Along with Joseph N. LeConte and James S. Hutchinson, he pioneered a high mountain route in 1908 from Yosemite National Park to Kings Canyon, roughly along the route of the modern John Muir Trail. In 28 days, they completed a trip of 228 miles through the high mountains, including several previously unexplored sections.

McDuffie suffered from Parkinson's disease for nearly 20 years before his death in 1951. The Sierra peak Mount McDuffie is named after him.

== External links and sources ==
- Duncan McDuffie: Cornelius Amory Pugsley Silver Medal Award, 1928
- History of Mason-McDuffie website
- SIGNATURE STYLE: Duncan McDuffie - Natural neighborhoods: Visionary developer created elegant urban 'residential parks', San Francisco Chronicle, Dave Weinstein, February 7, 2004
