= Susan River (California) =

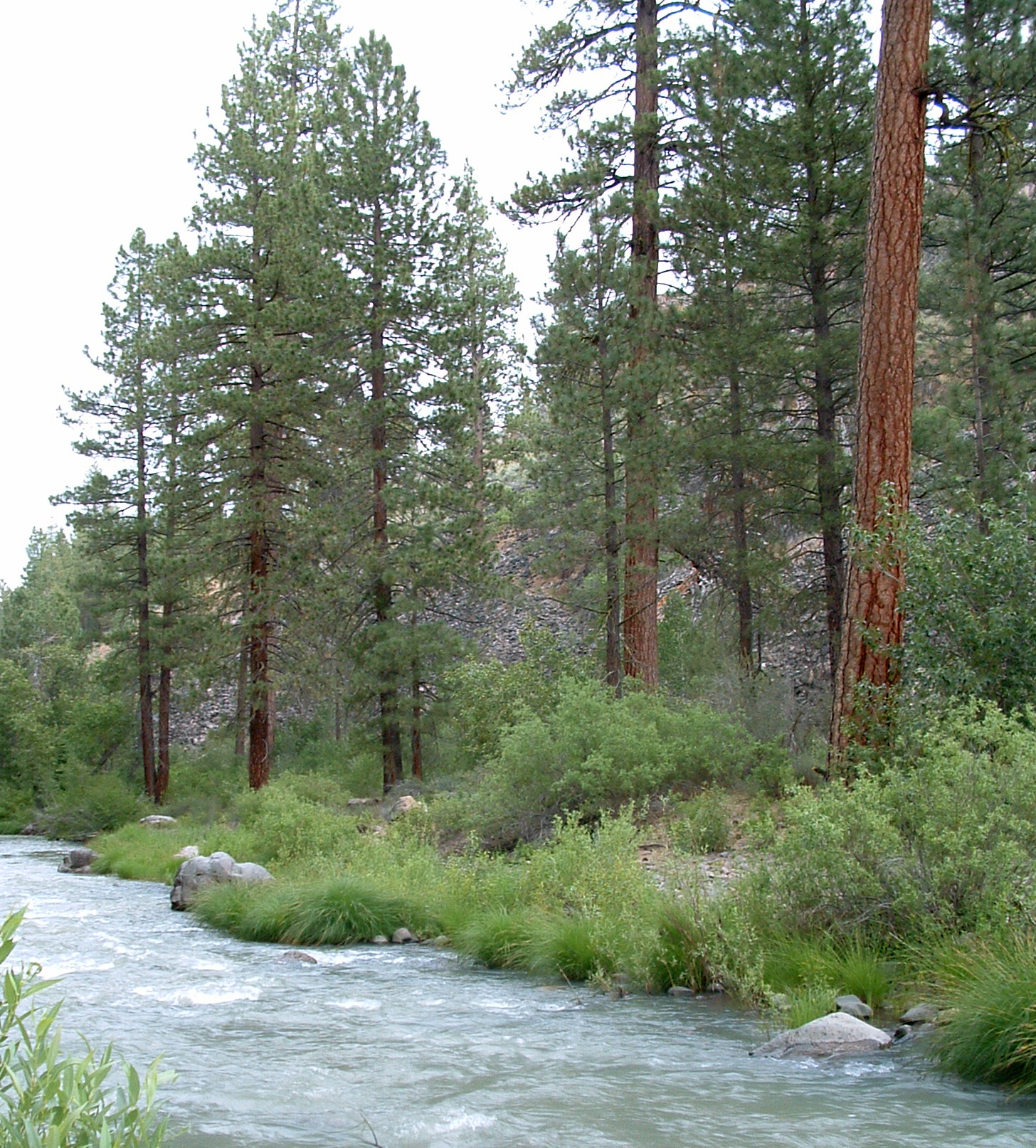

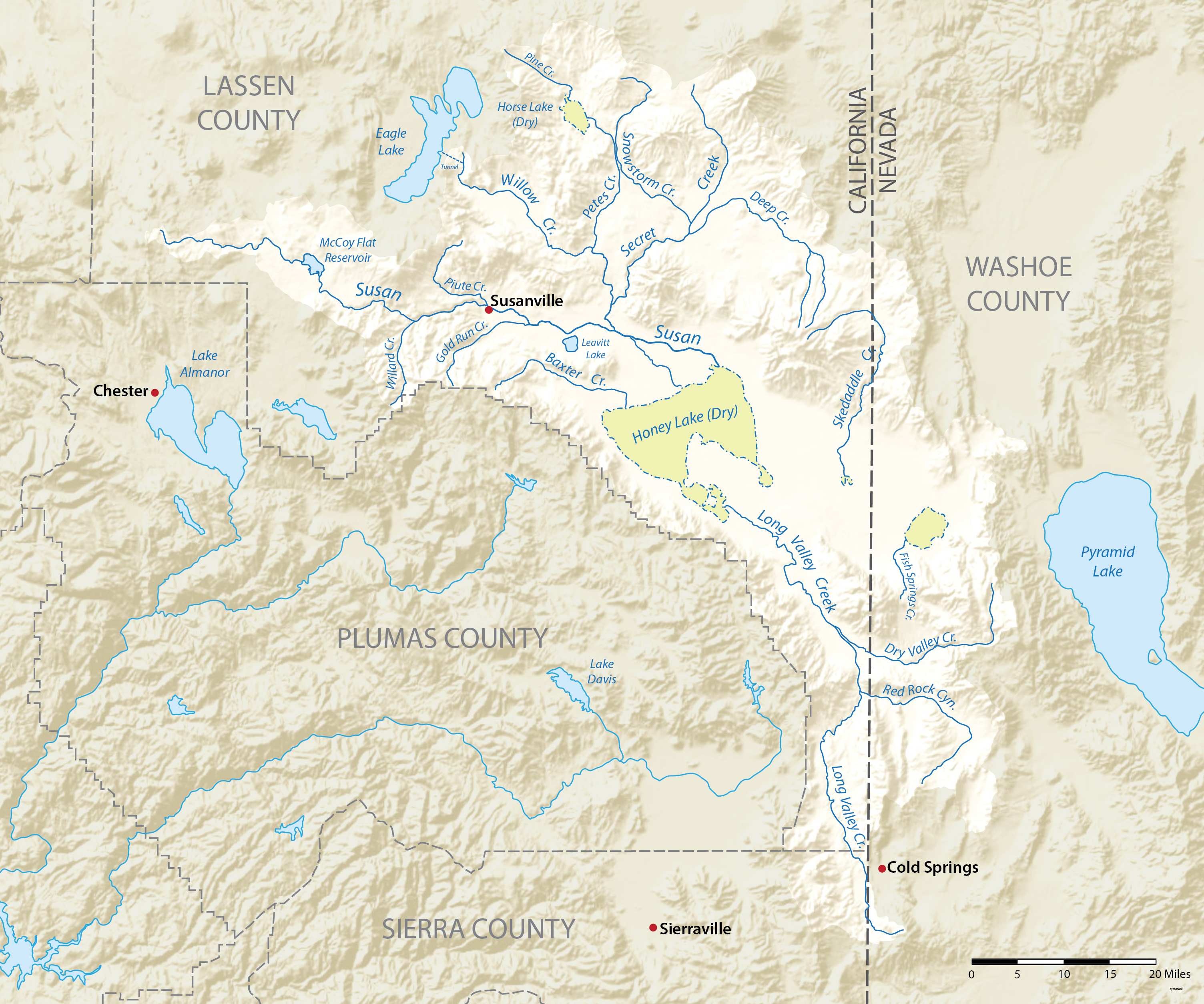
- The Susan River drainage is part of the endorheic Honey-Eagle lakes watershed of the Great Basin.
- Native name: Pam Sewim (Northeast Maidu)

Location
- Country: United States
- State: California
- Region: Lassen County
- Cities: Susanville, Johnstonville, Litchfield

Physical characteristics
- Source: Caribou Lake
  - location: 11 miles west of Norvell in the Lassen National Forest, Sierra Nevada, California
  - coordinates: 40°30′10″N 121°09′51″W
  - elevation: 6,571 ft (2,003 m)
- Mouth: Honey Lake
  - coordinates: 40°20′11″N 120°15′27″W
  - elevation: 3,993 ft (1,217 m)
- Length: 67 mi (108 km)
- Basin size: 1,170 sq mi (3,000 km^{2})
- Discharge
  - location: Susanville, 20 mi (32 km) from the mouth
  - average: 88 cu ft/s (2.5 m^{3}/s)
  - minimum: 0.6 cu ft/s (0.017 m^{3}/s)
  - maximum: 5,850 cu ft/s (166 m^{3}/s)

Basin features
- Tributaries
  - left: Piute Creek, Willow Creek

The Susan River (Northeast Maidu: Pam Sewim, bush creek) is a northeastern California river of approximately 67 miles (108 km) length that drains from an arid plateau of volcanic highlands along the Great Basin Divide to intermittent Honey Lake. The river flows from eastern Lassen County from east of Lassen Volcanic National Park generally east past Susanville and emerging into a ranching valley to enter the north end of Honey Lake. Along with Fredonyer Pass, the Susan River is the northern boundary of the Sierra Nevada.

== History ==
Susan River and the town of Susanville were named for Susan Roop, daughter of early settler Isaac Roop, in 1857.

== Watershed ==
Susan River begins at Caribou Lake at elevation 6,571 feet (2,003 m), which is dammed by Caribou Lake 234 Dam. It flows eastward, curving southeasterly as it enters the Great Basin, where it is joined on the left by Bridge Creek and dammed to form McCoy Flat Reservoir, approximately 11 miles northwest of Susanville. It next receives order from the right (heading downstream) Crazy Harry Gulch, Willard Creek, and Williams Creek before entering Susanville, where it receives Piute Creek from the left. Below Susanville, it receives from the left Gold Run Creek, Lassen Creek and Sand Slough, the latter at Johnstonville. At Johnstonville, the Lake Leavitt Inlet Canal diverts Susan River flows south to Lake Leavitt. After being joined by Willow Creek from the left, the Susan River passes below Litchfield and is extensively modified by a complicated system of canals and levees for irrigation of the surrounding ranching areas. Next, the river reaches the Honey Lake State Wildlife Area and finally Honey Lake itself at elevation 3,993 feet (1,217 m).
