= Fredonyer Pass =

Mountain pass in California, US

- Location within California
- Elevation: 5,752 feet (1,753 m)
- Traversed by: SR 36

Location
- Location: Lassen County, California, United States
- Range: Sierra Nevada/Cascades
- Coordinates: 40°21′35″N 120°52′03″W

Fredonyer Pass, elevation 5,752 feet (1,753 m), is a high mountain pass in Lassen County, California, southwest of Susanville and southeast of Mount Lassen. It lies on the Great Basin Divide between the Feather River to the west and the Susan River and Honey Lake to the east.

The pass is traversed by State Route 36 and has virtually the same elevation as Morgan Summit to the west (sources vary). It is subject to snowfall during the winter.

== Atlas Fredonyer ==
Fredonyer Pass received its name from Dr. Atlas Fredonyer, who discovered the pass in 1850.

Fredonyer was born in Switzerland in about 1832. In 1850, he traveled through the Humboldt River, Black Rock Desert and High Rock Canyon. He and his companions decided not to take the Lassen Trail and instead headed southwest from High Rock and discovered what is now known as Fredonyer Pass.

In 1862, Fredonyer was convicted of incest and eventually pardoned by California Governor Leland Stanford.

In 1880, Dr. Fredonyer died in San Francisco after colon surgery to remove a 16-ounce bottle that he had inadvertently lost inside his rectum after an attempt to alleviate a severe case of diarrhea.

== Geography ==
In the early 1900s, Fredonyer pass was known as Fredonia Pass.

In 1995, there was an unsuccessful move to rename Fredonyer Pass to honor of Deputy Sheriff Larry David Griffith, who was slain in the line of duty.

Fredonyer Pass is part of the approximate boundary between the Sierra Nevada and the Cascade Range. This irregular boundary is sometimes defined as the southern extent of Cenozoic igneous surface rock from the Cascade Range. This boundary roughly follows the drainage of the North Fork Feather River southeast to Fredonyer Pass. Note that there are other Cenozoic igneous rocks in the Sierra (e.g., near Lake Tahoe), but there is a clear geological division near Fredonyer Pass, and points westward as far as the Sacramento Valley.

== See also ==
- Great Basin Divide
