= James S. Hutchinson =

American lawyer

James Sather Hutchinson
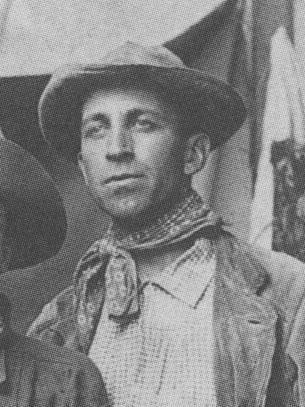
- Hutchinson in 1894
- Born: 1867; San Francisco, California, United States
- Died: 1959 (aged 91–92)
- Education: Hastings College of Law
- Occupation: Lawyer
- Known for: Exploration and mountaineering in the Sierra Nevada

James Sather Hutchinson (1867–1959) was a lawyer in San Francisco, California, a mountaineer and an environmentalist. He was most noted for being an explorer of the Sierra Nevada.

Hutchinson was born in San Francisco. His middle name likely came from his father's employer, Peder Sather. Hutchinson attended the University of California, Berkeley and then transferred to Harvard University where he received an A.B. degree in 1897. He attended the Hastings College of Law and received his LL.B. in 1899.

Along with Joseph N. LeConte and Duncan McDuffie, he pioneered a high mountain route in 1908 from Yosemite National Park to Kings Canyon, roughly along the route of the modern John Muir Trail. In 28 days, they completed a trip of 228 miles through the high mountains, including several previously unexplored sections. In 1920, he led an expedition from the Giant Forest to the Roaring River country, including the first trip over Colby Pass.

His first ascents included Mount Sill and North Palisade in 1903, Mount Humphreys in 1904, Mount Mills and Mount Abbot in 1908 and Black Kaweah in 1920. Of remote Black Kaweah on the Great Western Divide which he climbed at age 52, Hutchinson wrote, "The way those ragged rocks were broken, splintered, massed and piled together, helter-skelter, would have rejoiced the heart of a cubist artist. Again and again, I was reminded of The Nude Descending the Stairs."

California mountaineering historian Steve Roper called Hutchinson a "prominent figure in the history of Sierra mountaineering" and that "he compiled the most enviable first-ascent record any Sierra climber will ever have."

Hutchinson became a charter member of the Sierra Club as a college student, and was active in the Club throughout his life, including serving as a director from 1903 through 1908. He served as editor of the Sierra Club Bulletin in 1903 - 1904 and also in 1925.

An avid participant in cross country skiing and snow-shoeing, he established the Sierra Ski Club in the early 1920s with his brother Lincoln Hutchinson and William Colby, Joseph N. LeConte, Duncan McDuffie and others. They built a lodge at Norden near Donner Pass, which that small club used for nearly 30 years. In 1955, its members all elderly, the Sierra Ski Club was disbanded, and its lodge and land holdings were donated to the Sierra Club. The lodge was renamed Hutchinson Lodge after the brothers, and is still in operation as of 2010.

His career as an attorney in San Francisco lasted 60 years, and he appeared in court on his 90th birthday.
