= Mount Humphreys =

Mountain in California, United States

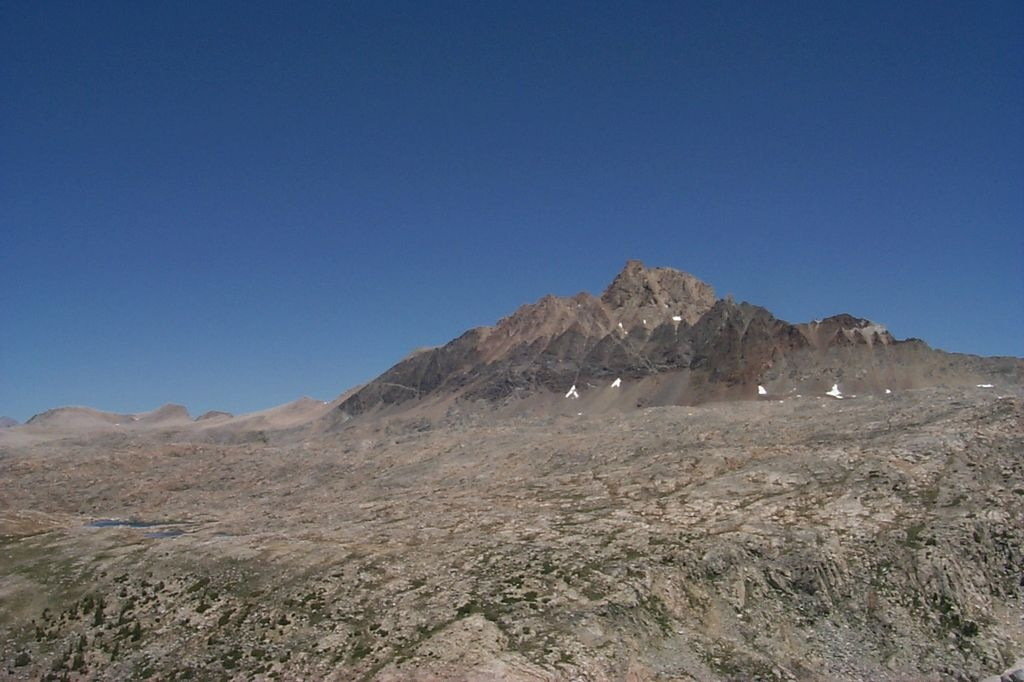
- Mount Humphreys from the south

Highest point
- Elevation: 13,992 ft (4,265 m) NAVD 88
- Prominence: 2563 ft (781 m)
- Isolation: 14.71 mi (23.67 km)
- Listing: North America highest peaks 62nd; US highest major peaks 47th; California highest major peaks 6th; SPS Emblem peak; Vagmarken Club Sierra Crest List; Western States Climbers Star peak
- Coordinates: 37°16′14″N 118°40′23″W

Geography
- Location within California Location within the United States
- Location: Fresno / Inyo counties, California, U.S.
- Parent range: Sierra Nevada
- Topo map: USGS Mount Tom

Climbing
- First ascent: 1904 by Edward C. Hutchinson and James S. Hutchinson
- Easiest route: Climb, class 4

Mount Humphreys is a mountain peak in the Sierra Nevada on the Fresno-Inyo county line in the U.S. state of California. It is the 13th highest peak in California (the highest peak that is not a fourteener), and the highest peak in the Bishop area. The mountain was named by the California Geological Survey of 1873 for Andrew A. Humphreys, the chief engineer of the United States Army at the time.

== See also ==
- List of mountain peaks of California
