= Willow Creek (Lassen County, California) =

River in Lassen County, California

Coordinates: 40°22′52″N 120°26′06″W

Willow Creek in Lassen County, California, is a tributary of the Susan River. The Willow Creek Wildlife Area offers wildlife viewing, bird watching and hunting along the creek.
