= Joseph Nisbet LeConte =

American explorer, cartographer, photographer and professor

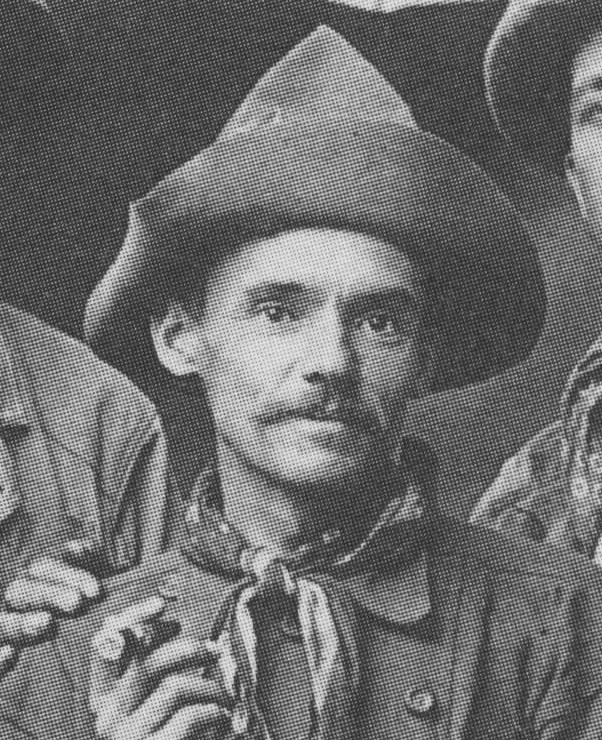
- LeConte in 1894
- Born: February 7, 1870; Oakland, California
- Died: February 1, 1950 (aged 79); Carmel, California
- Occupations: Engineering professor at UC Berkeley, Sierra Club President
- Known for: Exploration, mountaineering and photography of the Sierra Nevada

Joseph Nisbet LeConte (February 7, 1870 – February 1, 1950) was an American explorer of the Sierra Nevada. He was also a cartographer, a photographer and a professor of mechanical engineering.

== Early life ==
Joseph Nisbet LeConte was born in Oakland, California to Joseph and Caroline (Nisbet) LeConte. He went by "Little Joe" among friends, because he was of short stature and was the son of geology professor Joseph LeConte. He often went by J. N. LeConte in photographs and articles. He entered the University of California, Berkeley in 1887, earning a B.S. degree in 1891. He received a Master of Mechanical Engineering from Cornell University in 1892, and was appointed assistant professor of mechanical engineering at U.C. Berkeley that August, beginning by teaching kinematics of machinery.

== Career ==
Starting in 1912, he taught analytical mechanics for over 20 years. German physicist Wilhelm Röntgen discovered x-rays in 1895, and his first research paper was published at the end of December. An Austrian newspaper reported the results a week later. After reading those reports, LeConte found cathode-ray tubes that his late uncle John LeConte had obtained for the university's physics lab. LeConte and his associates were able to construct an x-ray machine and produce images of a bullet lodged in the arm of a young boy within a week of the newspaper reports of Röntgen's discovery. LeConte also studied the materials problems of gas turbines, and built a harmonic analyzer to study the performance of electric power transmission lines. He was a professor at U.C. Berkeley for his entire career that lasted 45 years.

LeConte loved mountaineering from the time he was a teenager and went all over the Sierra Nevada exploring, sometimes for several weeks. He produced the first map of the central Sierra Nevada for the Sierra Club, based on his exploration. At that time, USGS maps were not available. Along with James S. Hutchinson and Duncan McDuffie, he pioneered a high mountain route in 1908 from Yosemite National Park to Kings Canyon, roughly along the route of the modern John Muir Trail. In 28 days, they completed a trip of 228 miles through the high mountains, including several previously unexplored sections.

An avid photographer, he took many photos of the Sierra Nevada, including the High Sierra and Hetch Hetchy Valley before it was flooded by the dam. He worked with heavy, fragile dry glass plates that had to be transported with great care throughout the wilderness. In 1944, Ansel Adams evaluated his work: "Never intentionally 'arty', most of his compositions reveal a sensitive reaction to the finest moments of the mountain scene. It is this quality that differentiates between a mere record and a creative, sympathetic statement."

A charter and lifelong member of the Sierra Club, he held several positions of leadership in it. After John Muir died, he served as the club's second president (1915–1917). He was instrumental in helping create the John Muir Trail through the High Sierra as a tribute to his predecessor. He sat on the Sierra Club Board of Directors from 1898 through 1940, and at various times was vice president, secretary, treasurer, and outings chair.

In 1901 he married Helen Gompertz, whom he met in the Sierra Club.

LeConte Point in Hetch Hetchy Valley and Le Conte Avenue at the southern border of UCLA in Westwood Village, Los Angeles are named after him.
