= Sierra Nevada =

Mountain range in the United States

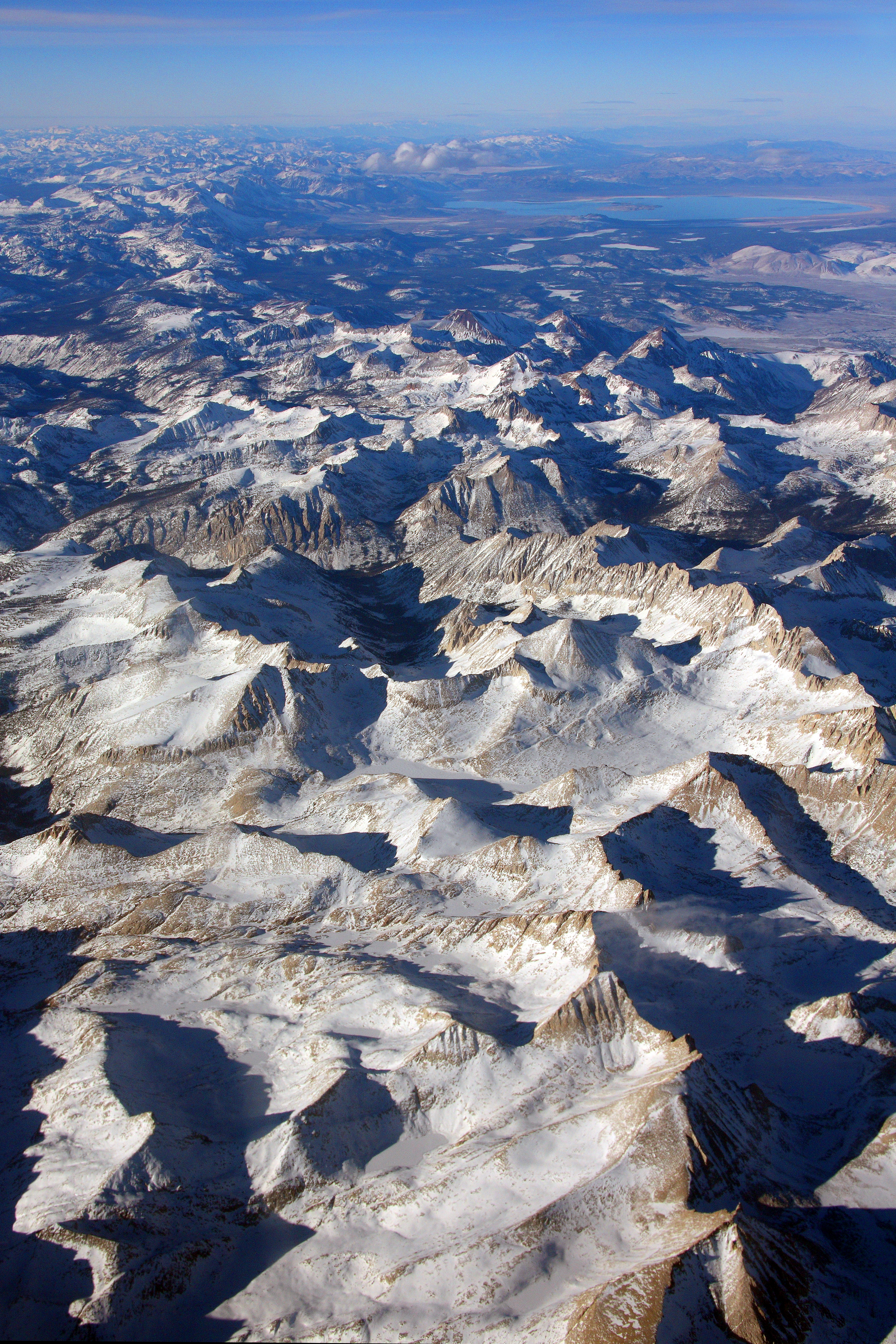
- The Sierra's Mills Creek cirque (center) is on the west side of the Sierra Crest, south of Mono Lake (top, blue).

Highest point
- Peak: Mount Whitney
- Elevation: 14,505 ft (4,421 m)
- Coordinates: 36°34′42.9″N 118°17′31.2″W

Dimensions
- Length: 400 mi (640 km) north-south from Fredonyer Pass to Tehachapi Pass
- Width: 80 mi (130 km)
- Area: 24,370 mi^{2} (63,100 km^{2})

Naming
- Etymology: 1777: Spanish for "snowy mountain range"
- Nicknames: the Sierra; the High Sierra; Range of Light (1894, John Muir)

Geography
- Position of Sierra Nevada inside California
- Country: United States
- States: California; Nevada
- Range coordinates: 38°00′N 119°30′W

Geology
- Rock age: Mesozoic
- Rock types: batholith; igneous

The Sierra Nevada (/siˌɛrə nɪˈvædə, -ˈvɑːd-/ see-ERR-ə nih-VA(H)D-ə) (Note: Spanish pronunciation: [ˈsjera neˈβaða]; lit. 'snowy range'.) is a mountain range in the Western United States, between the Central Valley of California and the Great Basin. The vast majority of the range lies in the state of California, although the Carson Range spur lies primarily in Nevada. The Sierra Nevada is part of the American Cordillera, an almost continuous chain of mountain ranges that forms the western "backbone" of the Americas.

The Sierra runs 400 mi (640 km) north-south, and its width ranges from 50 mi (80 km) to 80 mi (130 km) across east–west. Notable features include the General Sherman Tree, the largest tree in the world by volume; Lake Tahoe, the largest alpine lake in North America; Mount Whitney at 14,505 ft (4,421 m), the highest point in the contiguous United States; and Yosemite Valley sculpted by glaciers from one-hundred-million-year-old granite, containing high waterfalls. The Sierra is home to three national parks, twenty-six wilderness areas, ten national forests, and two national monuments. These areas include Yosemite, Sequoia, and Kings Canyon National Parks, as well as Devils Postpile National Monument.

More than one hundred million years ago during the Nevadan orogeny, granite formed deep underground. The range started to uplift less than five million years ago, and erosion by glaciers exposed the granite and formed the light-colored mountains and cliffs that make up the range. The uplift caused a wide range of elevations and climates in the Sierra Nevada, which are reflected by the presence of five life zones (areas with similar plant and animal communities). Uplift continues due to faulting caused by tectonic forces, creating spectacular fault block escarpments along the eastern edge of the southern Sierra.

The Sierra Nevada has played an important role in the history of California and the United States. The California gold rush occurred in the western foothills from 1848 through 1855. Due to its inaccessibility, the range was not fully explored until 1912.

== Name and etymology ==
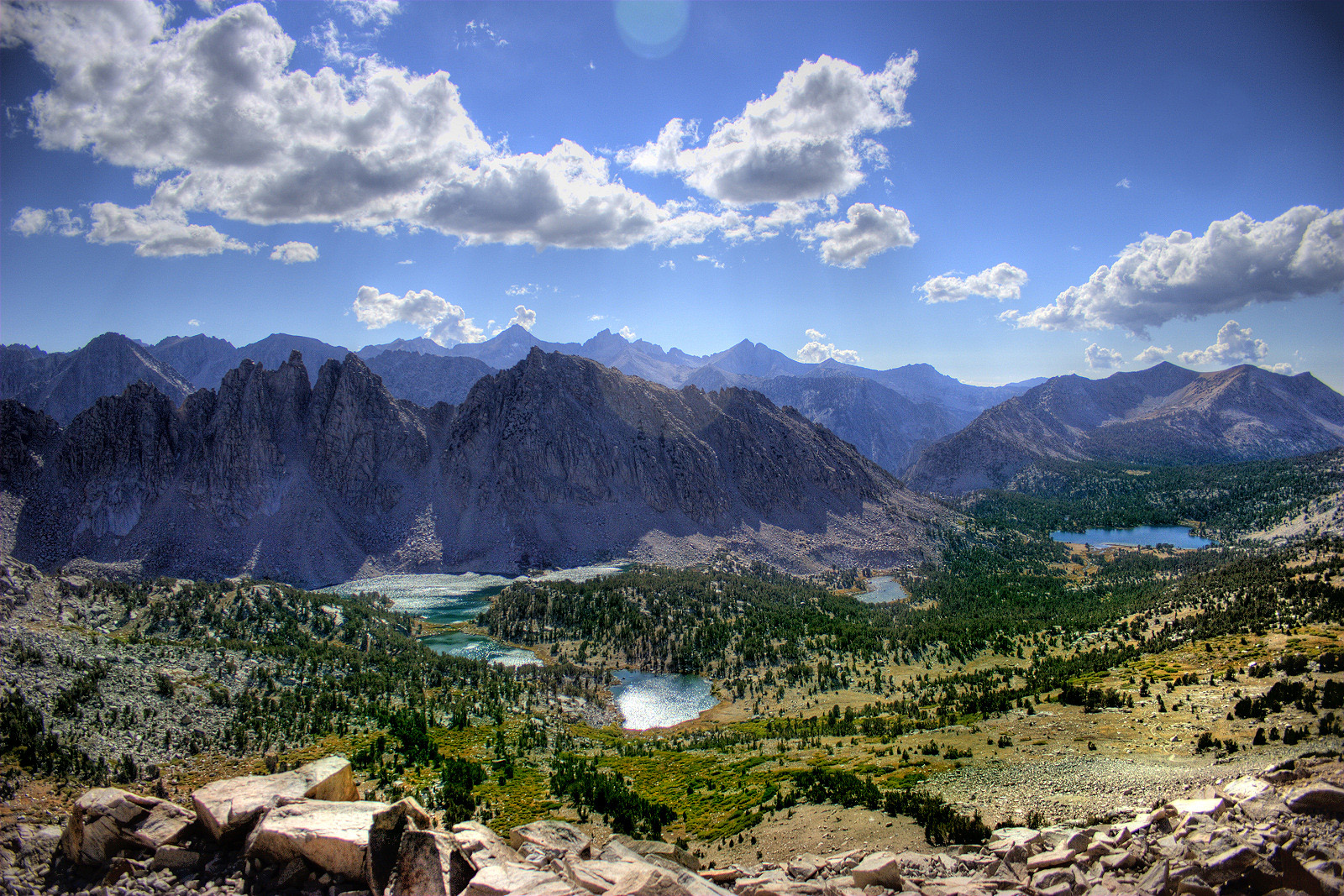
Kearsarge Lakes Basin is named after the USS Kearsarge. (Note: The ship was named after Mount Kearsarge in New Hampshire, see "Kearsarge (BB-5)". Dictionary of American Naval Fighting Ships. Naval History & Heritage Command (NHHC). February 23, 2005. Archived from the original on September 21, 2015.)

Used in 1542 by Juan Rodríguez Cabrillo to describe a Pacific Coast Range (Santa Cruz Mountains), the term "Sierra Nevada" was a general identification of less familiar ranges toward the interior. In 1776, Pedro Font's map applied the name to the range currently known as the Sierra Nevada.

The literal translation is "snowy mountains", from sierra "a range of mountains", 1610s, from Spanish sierra "jagged mountain range", lit. "saw", from Latin serra "a saw"; and from the Spanish adjective nevado "snowy".

While many mountain ranges are unanimously referred to in the plural (Smokies, Rockies, Cascades, etc.), some locals who live in "the Sierra" are not hesitant to admonish those who refer to the area as "the Sierras". However, there are historical and literary references that use the plural, such as the 1871 collection of Joaquin Miller poems, Songs of the Sierras. Ansel Adams, in response to a publication of his photographs under the title Parmelian Prints of the High Sierras, commented, "To add an s is a linguistic, Californian, and mountaineering sin."

== Geography ==
The Sierra Nevada lies primarily in Central and Eastern California, with the Carson Range, a small but historically important spur, extending into Nevada. West-to-east, the Sierra Nevada's elevation increases gradually from 500 feet (150 m) in the Central Valley to more than 14,000 feet (4,300 m) atop the highest peaks of its crest 50 to 75 miles (80 to 121 km) to the east. The east slope forms the steep Sierra Escarpment. Unlike its surroundings, the range receives a substantial amount of snowfall and precipitation due to orographic lift.

=== Setting ===
The Sierra Nevada's irregular northern boundary stretches from the Susan River and Fredonyer Pass to the North Fork Feather River. It represents where the granitic bedrock of the Sierra Nevada dives below the southern extent of Cenozoic igneous surface rock from the Cascade Range. The range is bounded on the west by California's Central Valley, on the east by the Basin and Range Province, and on the southeast by the Mojave Desert. The southern boundary is at Tehachapi Pass.

Physiographically, the Sierra is a section of the Cascade–Sierra Mountains province, which in turn is part of the larger Pacific Mountain System physiographic division.

=== Watersheds ===
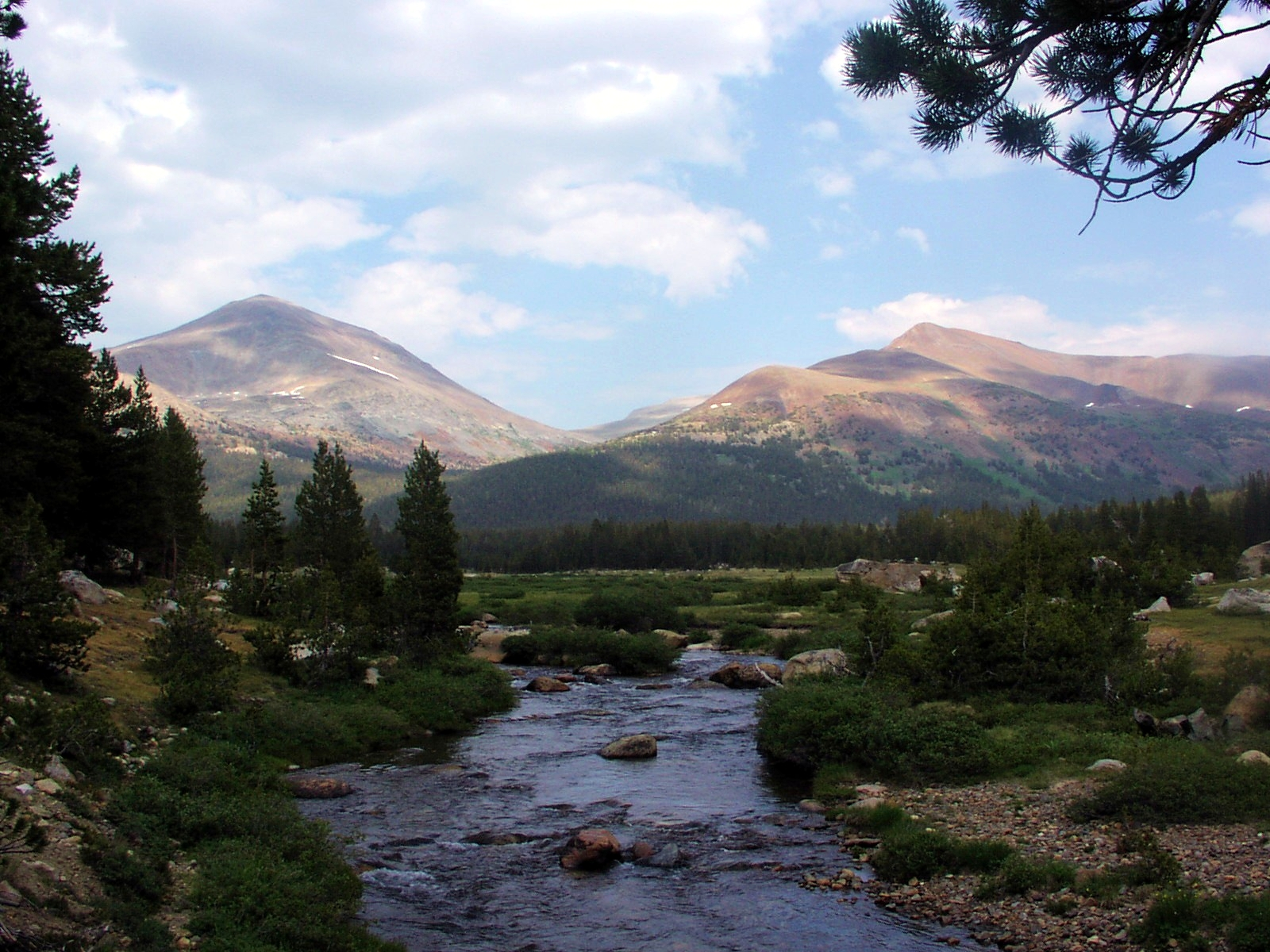
The Sierra hosts many waterways, such as the Tuolumne River.

The range is drained on its western slope by the Central Valley watershed, which discharges into the Pacific Ocean at San Francisco. The northern third of the western Sierra is part of the Sacramento River watershed (including the Feather, Yuba, and American River tributaries), and the middle third is drained by the San Joaquin River (including the Mokelumne, Stanislaus, Tuolumne, and Merced River tributaries). The southern third of the range is drained by the Kings, Kaweah, Tule, and Kern rivers, which flow into the endorheic basin of Tulare Lake, which rarely overflows into the San Joaquin during wet years.

The eastern slope watershed of the Sierra is much narrower; its rivers flow out into the endorheic Great Basin of eastern California and western Nevada. From north to south, the Susan River flows into intermittent Honey Lake, the Truckee River flows from Lake Tahoe into Pyramid Lake, the Carson River runs into Carson Sink, the Walker River into Walker Lake; Rush, Lee Vining and Mill Creeks flow into Mono Lake; and the Owens River into dry Owens Lake. Although none of the eastern rivers reach the sea, many of the streams from Mono Lake southwards are diverted into the Los Angeles Aqueduct which provides water to Southern California.

=== Elevation ===
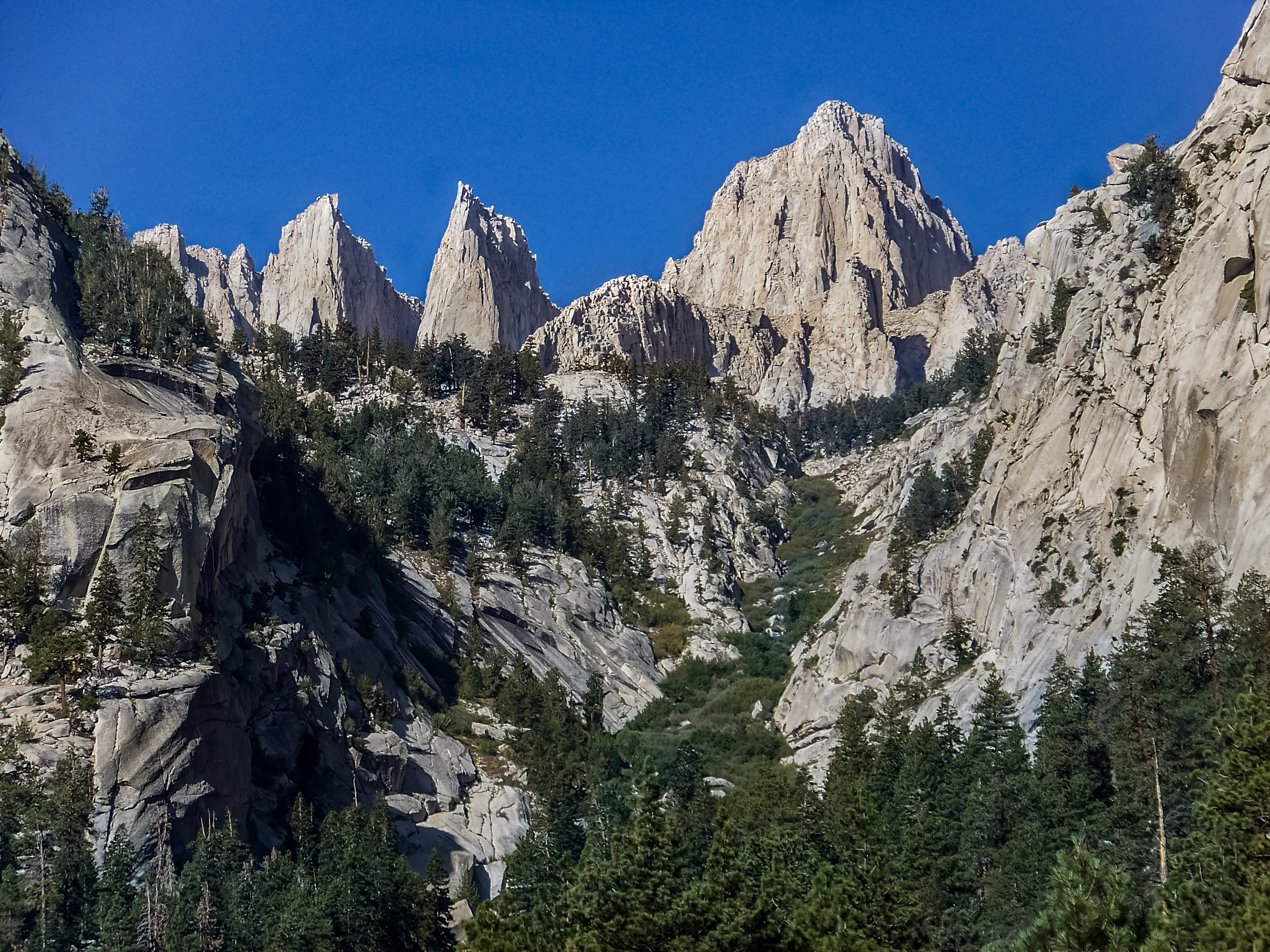
Mount Whitney, the highest peak in the range and the contiguous United States

The height of the mountains in the Sierra Nevada increases gradually from north to south. Between Fredonyer Pass and Lake Tahoe, the peaks range from 5,000 feet (1,500 m) to more than 9,000 feet (2,700 m). The crest near Lake Tahoe is roughly 9,000 feet (2,700 m) high, with several peaks approaching the height of Freel Peak (10,881 ft or 3,317 m). Farther south, the highest peak in Yosemite National Park is Mount Lyell (13,120 ft or 3,999 m). The Sierra rises to almost 14,000 feet (4,300 m) with Mount Humphreys near Bishop, California. Finally, near Lone Pine, Mount Whitney is the highest point in the contiguous United States, at 14,505 feet (4,421 m).

South of Mount Whitney, the elevation of the range quickly dwindles. The crest elevation is almost 10,000 feet (3,000 m) near Lake Isabella, but south of the lake, the peaks reach only a modest 8,000 feet (2,400 m).

=== Notable features ===
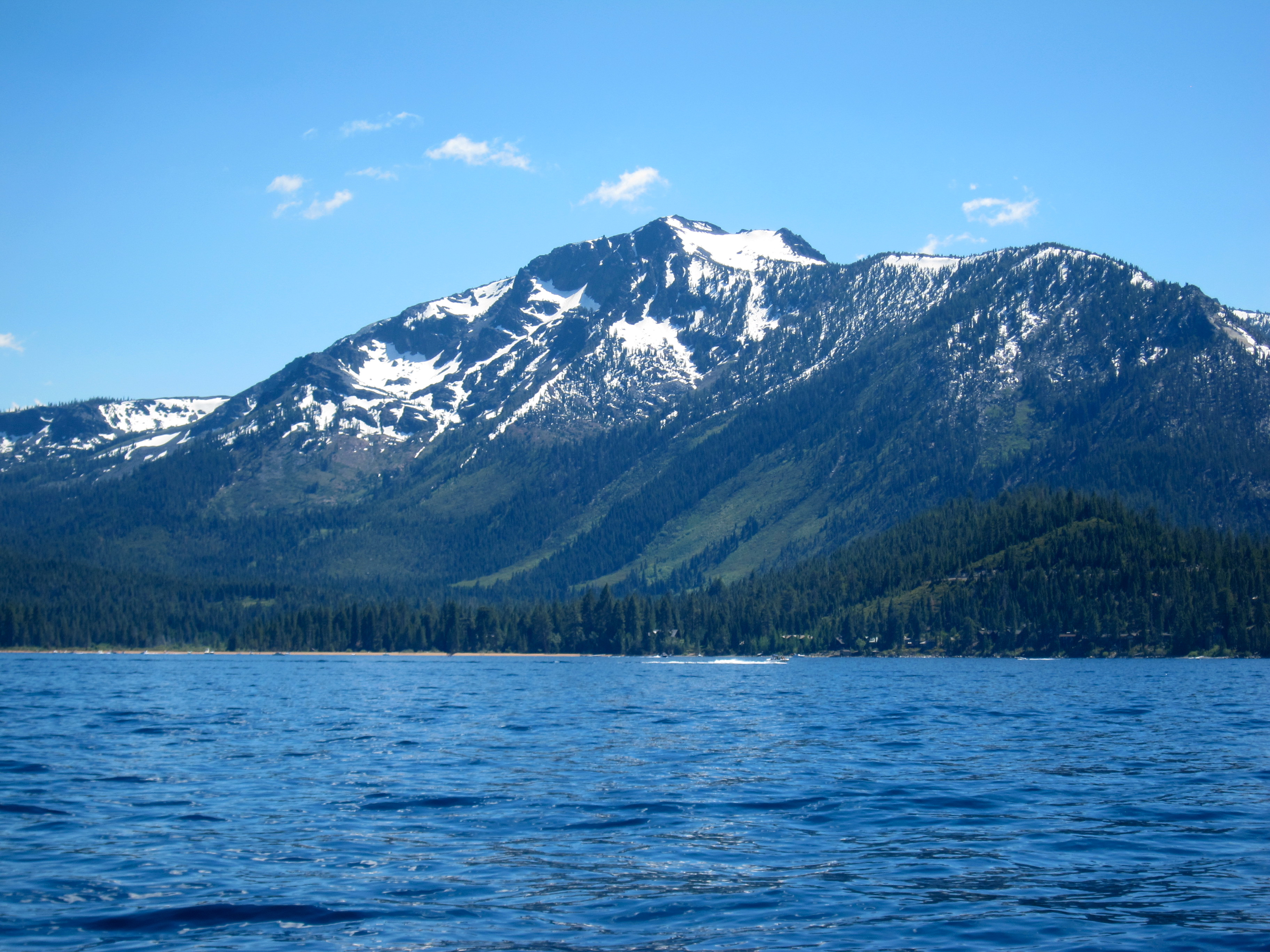
Mount Tallac above Lake Tahoe

There are several notable geographical features in the Sierra Nevada:

- Lake Tahoe is a large, clear freshwater lake in the northern Sierra Nevada, with an elevation of 6,225 ft (1,897 m) and an area of 191 sq mi (490 km^{2}). Lake Tahoe lies between the main Sierra and the Carson Range, a spur of the Sierra.
- Hetch Hetchy Valley, Yosemite Valley, Kings Canyon, and Kern Canyon are examples of many glacially-scoured canyons on the west side of the Sierra.
- Yosemite National Park is filled with notable features such as waterfalls, granite domes, high mountains, lakes, and meadows.
- Groves of giant sequoias Sequoiadendron giganteum occur along a narrow band of altitude on the western side of the Sierra Nevada. Giant sequoias are the largest trees in the world.
- Two of the largest rivers in California, which form the Central Valley and drain into San Francisco Bay, derive most of their flow from the western slopes of the Sierra Nevada. The northern of the two is the Sacramento River (which also drains the adjacent Cascade Range and Klamath Range); the southern one is the San Joaquin River.

=== Communities ===
Communities in the Sierra Nevada include Paradise, South Lake Tahoe, Truckee, Grass Valley, Lee Vining, Mammoth Lakes, Sonora, Nevada City, Placerville, Pollock Pines, Portola, Auburn, Colfax, Kennedy Meadows and Shaver Lake.

=== Protected areas ===
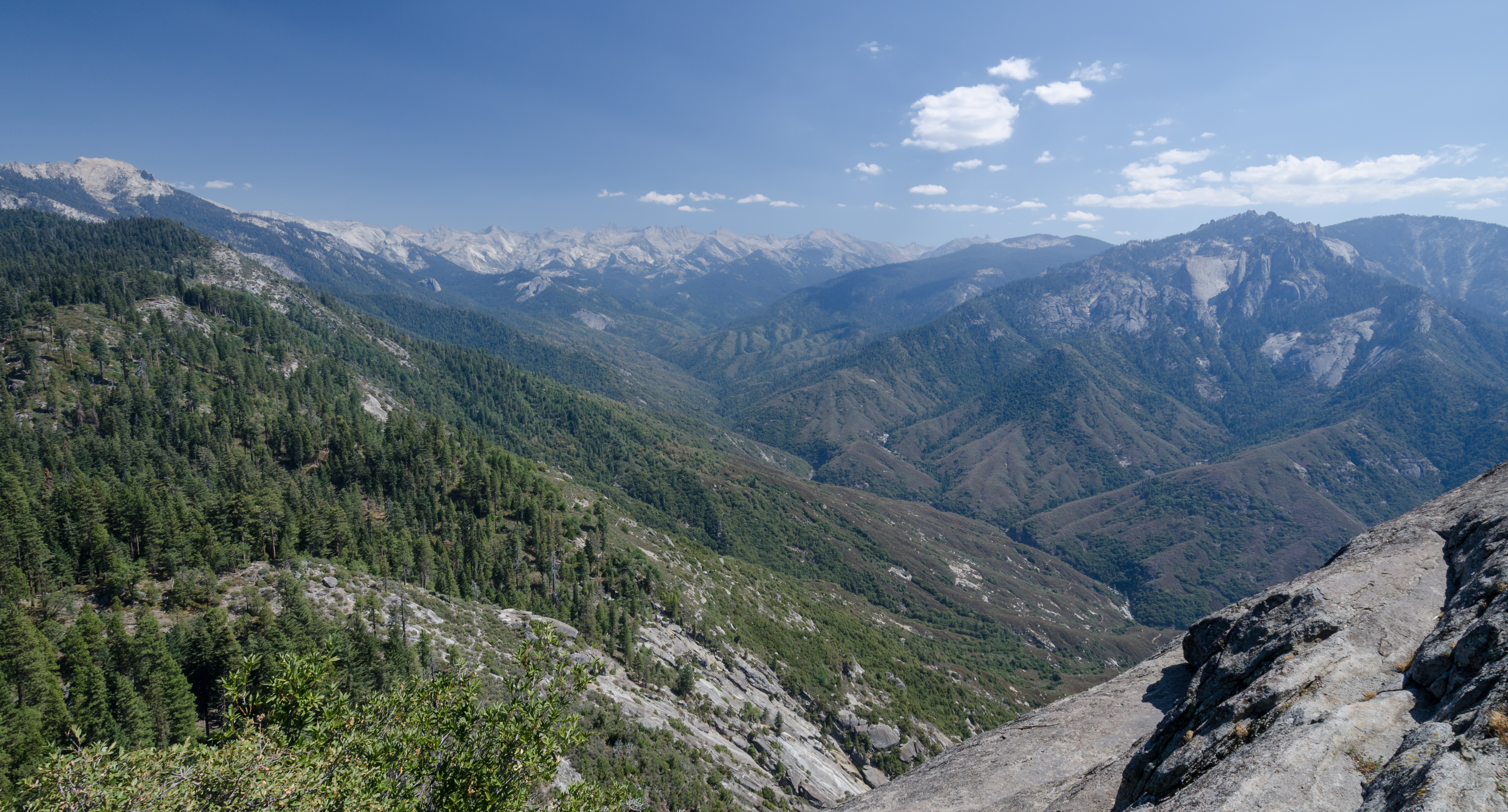
View of Sequoia National Park from Moro Rock

Much of the Sierra Nevada consists of federal lands and is either protected from development or strictly managed. The mountain range is home to three National Parks – Yosemite, Kings Canyon, and Sequoia – and two national monuments – Devils Postpile and Giant Sequoia. Ten national forests span much of the mountain range's remaining area. Within these national parks, monuments, and forests lie 26 wilderness areas, which together protect 15.4% of the Sierra's 63,118 km^{2} (24,370 mi^{2}) from logging, development, and wheeled vehicle use.

The United States Forest Service and the Bureau of Land Management currently control 52% of the land in the Sierra Nevada. Logging and grazing are generally allowed on land controlled by these agencies, under federal regulations that balance recreation and development on the land.

The California Bighorn Sheep Zoological Area near Mount Williamson in the southern Sierra was established to protect the endangered Sierra Nevada bighorn sheep. Starting in 1981, hikers were unable to enter the Area from May 15 through December 15, in order to protect the sheep. As of 2010, the restriction has been lifted and access to the Area is open for the whole year.

== Geologic history ==
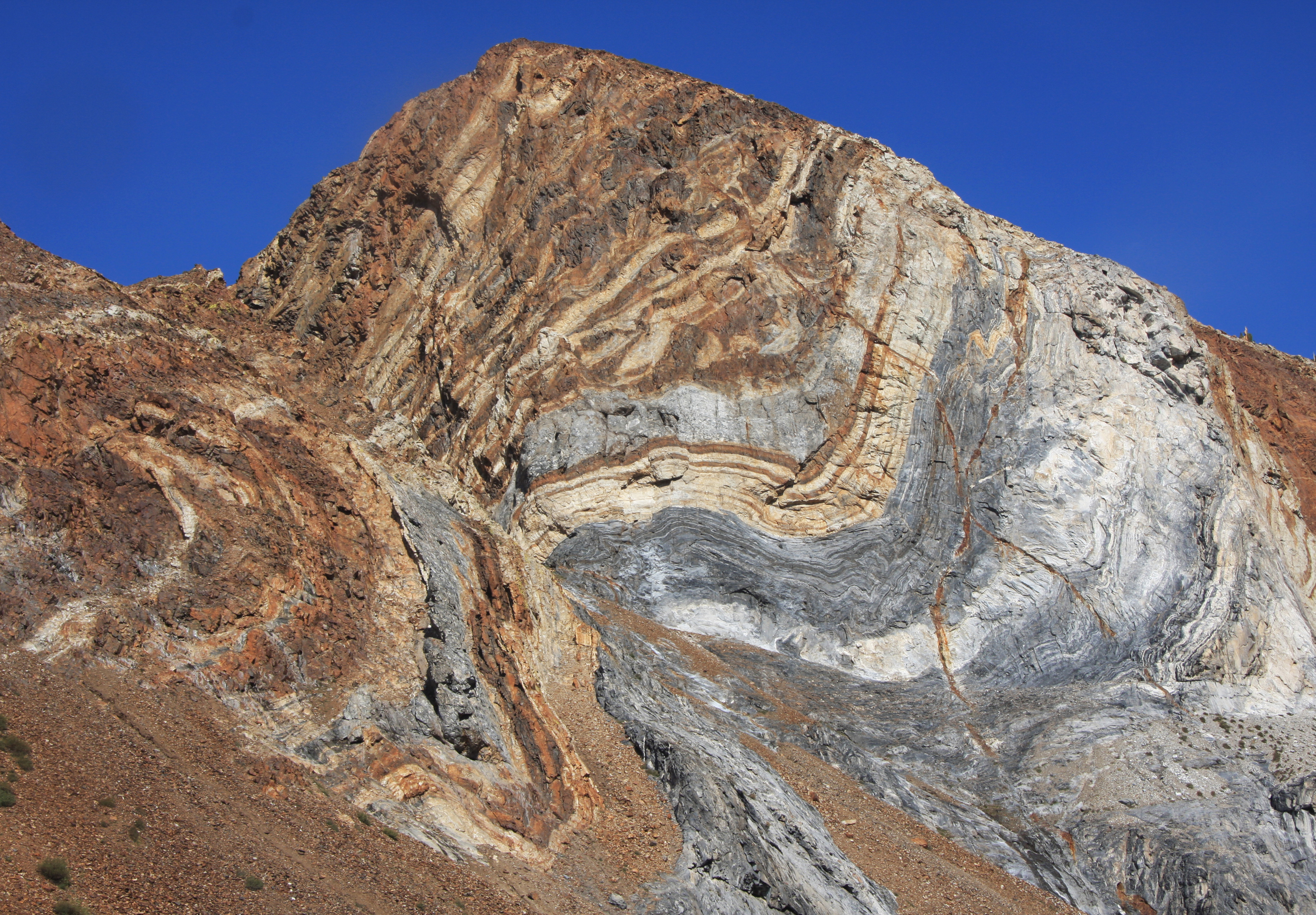
Sevehah Cliff, near Convict Lake, shows severely deformed Devonian rock.

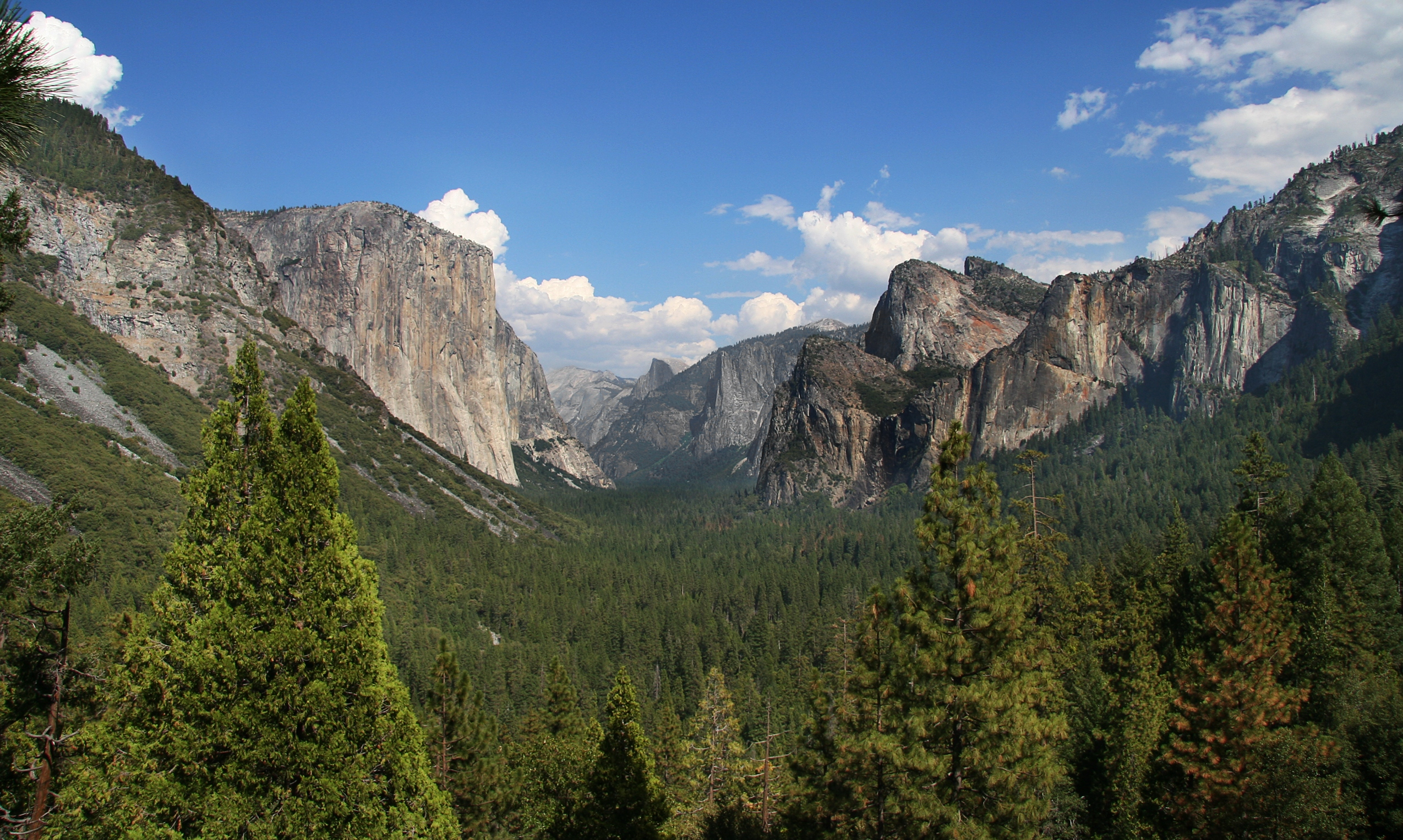
Yosemite Valley in Yosemite National Park was carved by glaciers.

The earliest rocks in the Sierra Nevada are metamorphic roof pendants of Paleozoic age, the oldest being metasedimentary rocks from the Cambrian in the Mount Morrison region. These dark-colored hornfels, slates, marbles, and schists are found in the western foothills (notably around Coarsegold, west of the Tehachapi Pass) and east of the Sierra Crest. The earliest granite of the Sierra started to form in the Triassic period. This granite is mostly found east of the crest and north of 37.2°N. In the Triassic and into the Jurassic, an island arc collided with the west coast of North America and raised a chain of volcanoes, in an event called the Nevadan orogeny. Nearly all subaerial Sierran Arc volcanoes have since disappeared; their remains were redeposited during the Great Valley Sequence and the subsequent Cenozoic filling of the Great Valley, which is the source of much of the sedimentary rock in California.

In the Cretaceous, a subduction zone formed at the edge of the continent. This means that an oceanic plate started to dive beneath the North American Plate. Magma, formed through the subduction of the ancient Farallon Plate, rose in plumes (plutons) deep underground, their combined mass forming what is called the Sierra Nevada batholith. These plutons formed at various times, from 115 Ma to 87 Ma. The earlier plutons formed in the western half of the Sierra, while the later plutons formed in the eastern half of the Sierra. At this time, the Sierra Nevada formed the western ramp of a high plateau to the east, the Nevadaplano. During this period, rivers cut deep canyons into the range, generating topographic relief similar to the modern Sierra Nevada. This period of incision was halted approximately 30 million years ago by vast outpourings of pyroclastic flows from Nevada which filled the northern Sierran valleys with volcanic deposits. These pyroclastic flows, which continued for about 10 million years, were followed by andesitic lahars which nearly completely buried the northern Sierran landscape such that only the tallest peaks emerged above a volcanic plain. This second period of volcanism appears to have been triggered by crustal extension associated with extension of the Basin and Range Province. As this andesitic volcanism began waning about five million years ago, the rivers were able to begin eroding away the 100s of meters of volcanic deposits and resume the incision that had been halted by the first period of volcanism.

Some studies have argued that this recent incision is a sign of recent tectonic uplift. Other geologists claim that the elevations of many of the modern rivers flowing down the range are only 100–300 meters (300–1,000 ft) lower than their ancient counterparts from 30–40 million years ago and the overall elevation and bedrock topography of the northern Sierra Nevada has changed little since at least 30–40 million years ago.

About 2.5 Ma, the Earth's climate cooled, and ice ages started. Glaciers carved out characteristic U-shaped canyons throughout the Sierra. The combination of river and glacier erosion exposed the uppermost portions of the plutons emplaced millions of years before, leaving only a remnant of metamorphic rock on top of some Sierra peaks.

Extension of the Basin and Range continues today, leading to downdropping of crustal blocks just east of the Sierra Nevada during large earthquakes, such as the Lone Pine earthquake of 1872.

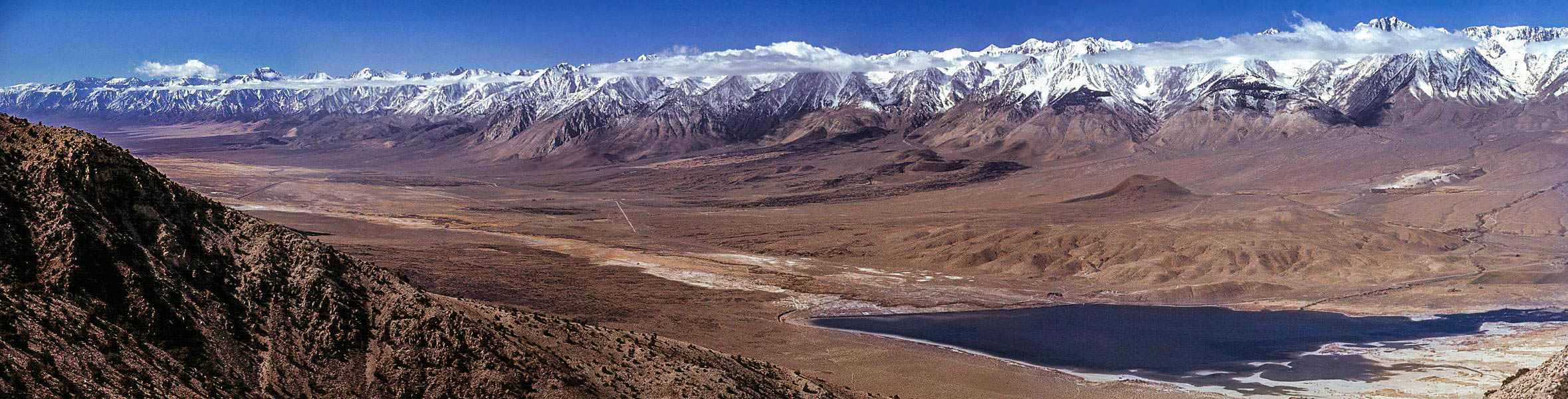
Sierra Escarpment viewed from the east. In the foreground is Tinemaha Reservoir in the Owens Valley.

== Climate and meteorology ==
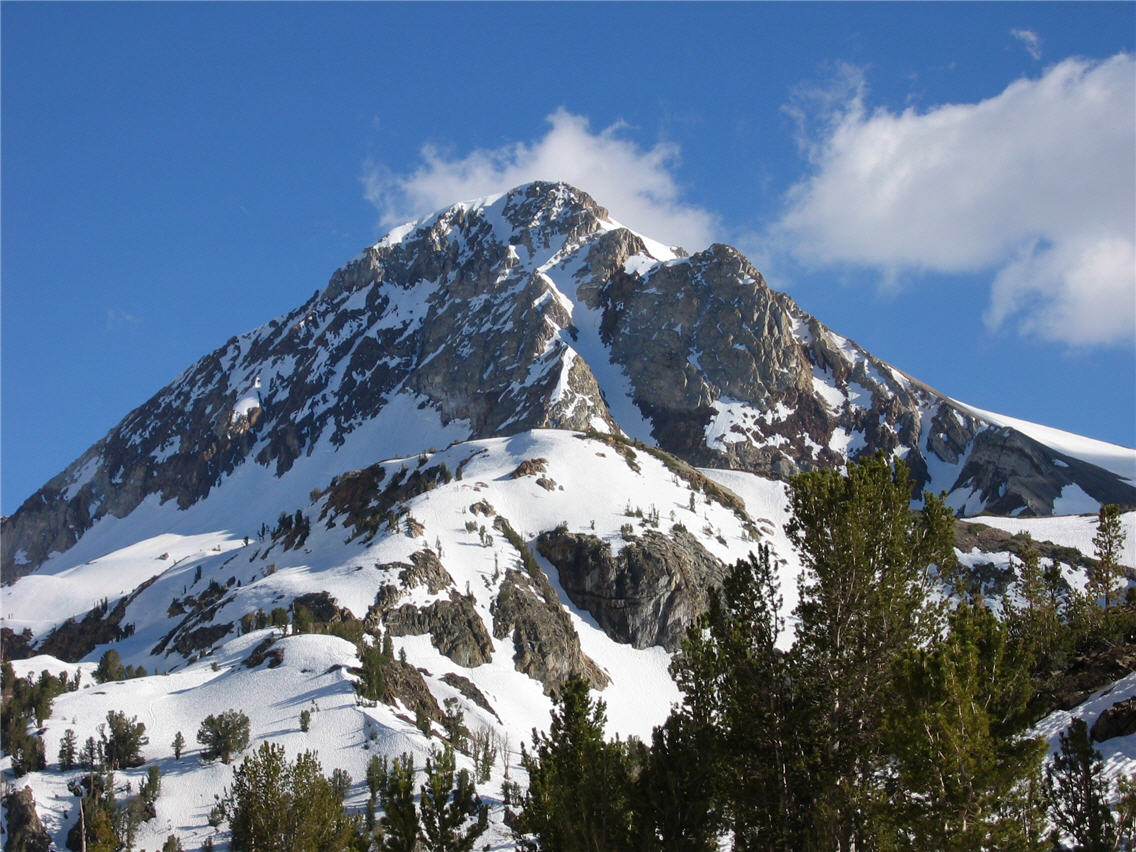
Red Slate Mountain (elevation 13,156 ft or 4,010 m) is still covered with snow in June.

The climate of the Sierra Nevada is influenced by the Mediterranean climate of California. During the fall, winter and spring, precipitation in the Sierra ranges from 20 to 80 in (510 to 2,030 mm) where it occurs mostly as snow above 6,000 ft (1,800 m). Precipitation is highest on the central and northern portions of the western slope between 5,000 and 8,000 feet (1,500 and 2,400 m) elevation, due to orographic lift. Above 8,000 feet (2,400 m), precipitation diminishes on the western slope up to the crest, since most of the precipitation has been wrung out at lower elevations. Most parts of the range east of the crest are in a rain shadow, and receive less than 25 inches of precipitation per year. While most summer days are dry, afternoon thunderstorms are common, particularly during the North American Monsoon in mid and late summer. Some of these summer thunderstorms drop over an inch of rain in a short period, and the lightning can start fires. Summer high temperatures average 42–90 °F (6–32 °C). Winters are comparatively mild, and the temperature is usually only just low enough to sustain a heavy snowpack. For example, Tuolumne Meadows, at 8,600 feet (2,600 m) elevation, has winter daily highs about 40 °F (4 °C) with daily lows about 10 °F (−12 °C). The growing season lasts 20 to 230 days, strongly dependent on elevation. The highest elevations of the Sierra have an alpine climate.

The Sierra Nevada snowpack is the major source of water and a significant source of electric power generation in California. Many reservoirs were constructed in the canyons of the Sierra throughout the 20th century, Several major aqueducts serving both agriculture and urban areas distribute Sierra water throughout the state. However, the Sierra casts a rain shadow, which greatly affects the climate and ecology of the central Great Basin. This rain shadow is largely responsible for Nevada being the driest state in the United States.

Precipitation varies substantially from year to year. It is not uncommon for some years to receive precipitation totals far above or below normal.

The height of the range and the steepness of the Sierra Escarpment, particularly at the southern end of the range, produces a wind phenomenon known as the "Sierra Rotor". This is a horizontal rotation of the atmosphere just east of the crest of the Sierra, set in motion as an effect of strong westerly winds.

The Sierra Nevada is home to the Mono winds, strong, dry downslope winds that primarily affect the western slopes, especially in the central region, and are most common from late fall to spring. With gusts reaching over 80 miles per hour, these winds can cause widespread disruption, uprooting trees, damaging infrastructure, and making mountain passes hazardous for drivers.

Because of the large number of airplanes that have crashed in the Sierra Nevada, primarily due to the complex weather and atmospheric conditions such as downdrafts and microbursts caused by geography there, a portion of the area, a triangle whose vertices are Reno, Nevada; Fresno, California; and Las Vegas, Nevada, has been dubbed the "Nevada Triangle", in reference to the Bermuda Triangle. Some counts put the number of crashes in the triangle at 2,000, including millionaire and record-breaking flyer Steve Fossett. Hypotheses that the crashes are related in some way to the United States Air Force's Area 51, or to the activities of extra-terrestrial aliens, have no evidence to support them.

== Ecology ==
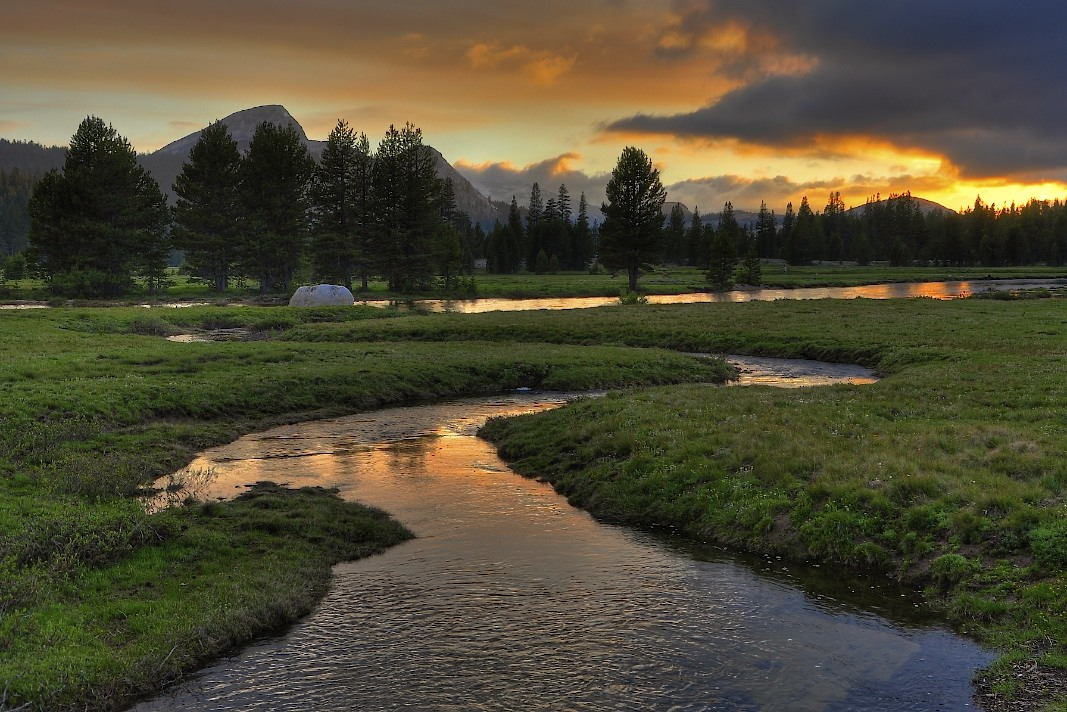
Tuolumne Meadows is an example of a subalpine meadow in the Sierra.

The Sierra Nevada is divided into a number of biotic zones, each of which is defined by its climate and supports a number of interdependent species. Life in the higher elevation zones adapted to colder weather, and to most of the precipitation falling as snow. The rain shadow of the Sierra causes the eastern slope to be warmer and drier: each life zone is higher in the east. A list of biotic zones, and corresponding elevations, is presented below:

- The western foothill zone, 1,000–2,500 ft (300–760 m), with grassland, oak-grass savanna and chaparral-oak woodland. Gray pine (also known as Foothill pine) is intermixed with the oak woodland.
- The Pinyon pine-Juniper woodland, 5,000–7,000 ft (1,500–2,100 m) east side only.
- The Sierra Nevada lower montane forest (indicator species: Ponderosa pine, Jeffrey pine), 2,500–7,000 ft (760–2,130 m) west side, 7,000–9,000 ft (2,100–2,700 m) east side. This biotic zone is notable for containing giant sequoia.
- The Sierra Nevada upper montane forest (indicator species: Lodgepole pine, Red fir) 7,000–9,000 ft (2,100–2,700 m) west side, 9,000–10,500 ft (2,700–3,200 m) east side.
- The Sierra Nevada subalpine zone (indicator species: Whitebark pine) 9,000–10,500 ft (2,700–3,200 m) west side, 10,500–11,500 ft (3,200–3,500 m) east side
- The alpine region at greater than 10,500 ft (3,200 m), and greater than 11,500 ft (3,500 m) east side.

== History ==
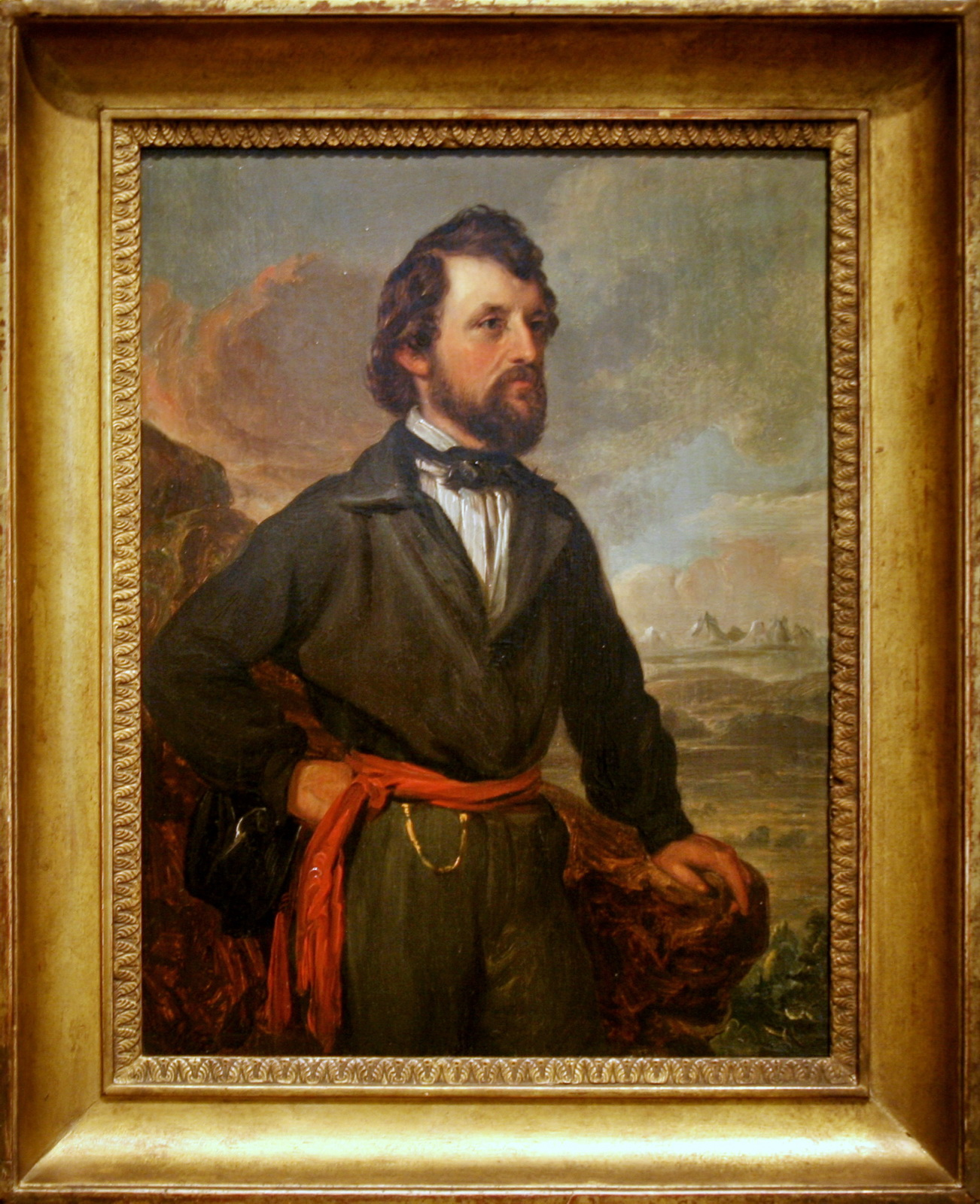
John Frémont was an early American explorer of the Sierra.

=== Native Americans ===
Archaeological excavations placed Martis people of Paleo-Indians in northcentral Sierra Nevada during the period of 3,000 BCE to 500 CE. The earliest identified sustaining indigenous people in the Sierra Nevada were the Northern Paiute tribes on the east side, with the Mono tribe and Sierra Miwok tribe on the western side, and the Kawaiisu and Tübatulabal tribes in the southern Sierra. Today, some historic intertribal trade route trails over mountain passes are known artifact locations, such as Duck Pass with its obsidian arrowheads. The California and Sierra Native American tribes were predominantly peaceful, with occasional territorial disputes between the Paiute and Sierra Miwok tribes in the mountains. Washo and Maidu were also in this area prior to the era of European exploration and displacement.

=== Initial European-American exploration ===
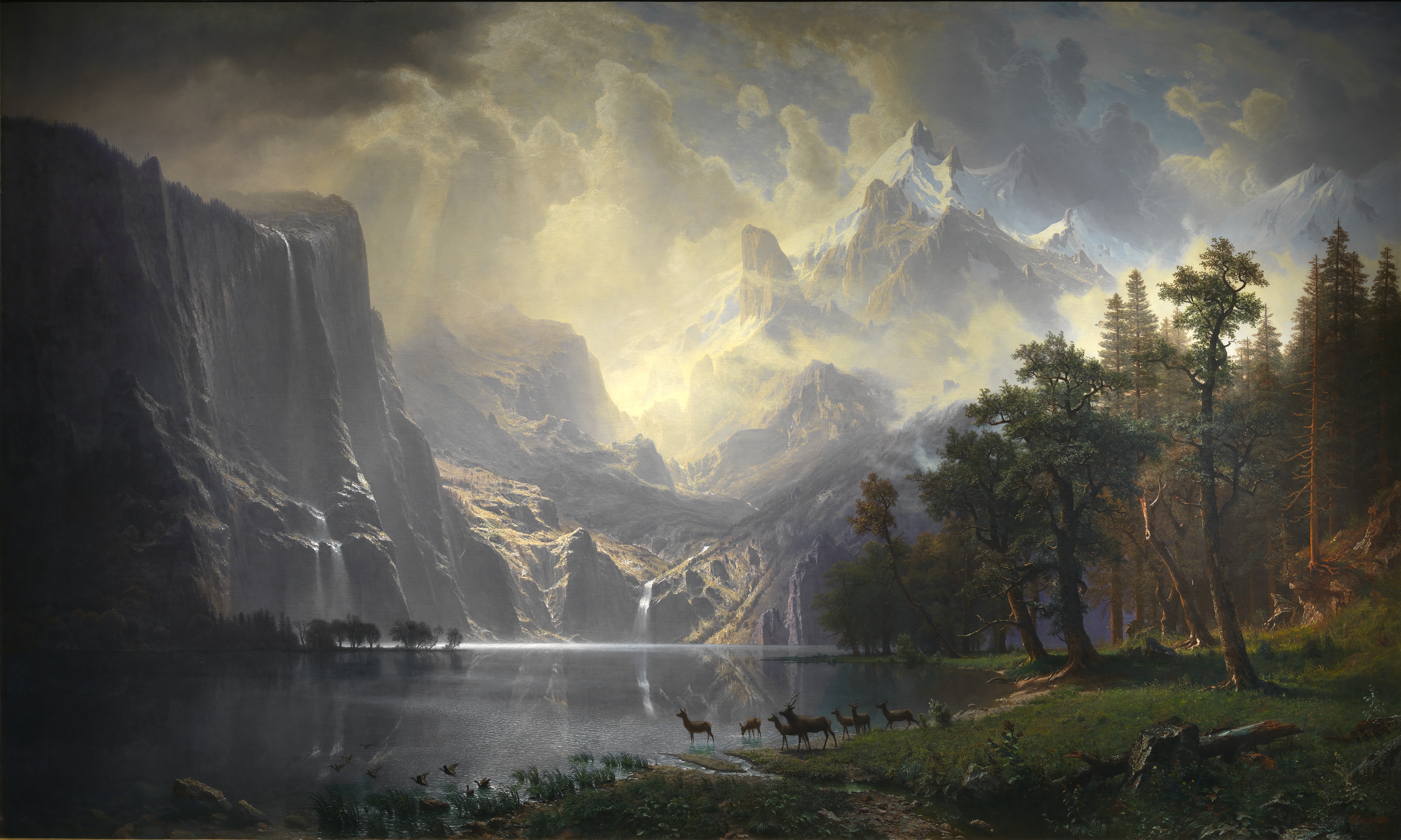
Albert Bierstadt, Among the Sierra Nevada, California, 1868

American exploration of the mountain range started in 1827. Although prior to the 1820s there were Spanish missions, pueblos (towns), presidios (forts), and ranchos along the coast of California, no Spanish explorers visited the Sierra Nevada. The first Americans to visit the mountains were amongst a group led by fur trapper Jedediah Smith, crossing north of the Yosemite area in May 1827, at Ebbetts Pass.

In 1833, a subgroup of the Bonneville Expedition led by Joseph Reddeford Walker was sent westward to find an overland route to California. Eventually the party discovered a route along the Humboldt River across present-day Nevada, ascending the Sierra Nevada, starting near present-day Bridgeport and descending between the Tuolumne and Merced River drainage. The group may have been the first non-indigenous people to see Yosemite Valley. The Walker Party probably visited either the Tuolumne or Merced Groves of giant sequoia, becoming the first non-indigenous people to see the giant trees, but journals relating to the Walker party were destroyed in 1839, in a print shop fire in Philadelphia.

Starting in 1841, emigrants from the United States started to move to California via Sonora and Walker Passes.

In the winter of 1844, Lt. John C. Frémont, accompanied by Kit Carson, was the first European American to see Lake Tahoe. The Frémont party camped at 8,050 ft (2,450 m).

=== Gold rush ===
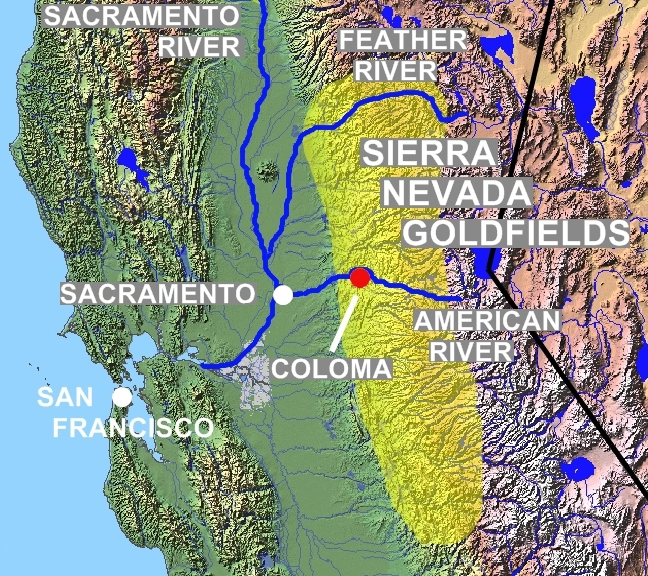
Map of gold fields in the Sierra

The California Gold Rush began at Sutter's Mill, near Coloma, in the western foothills of the Sierra. On January 24, 1848, James W. Marshall, a foreman working for Sacramento pioneer John Sutter, found shiny metal in the tailrace of a lumber mill Marshall was building for Sutter on the American River. Rumors soon started to spread and were confirmed in March 1848 by San Francisco newspaper publisher and merchant Samuel Brannan. Brannan strode through the streets of San Francisco, holding aloft a vial of gold, shouting "Gold! Gold! Gold from the American River!"

On August 19, 1848, the New York Herald was the first major newspaper on the East Coast to report the discovery of gold. On December 5, 1848, President James Polk confirmed the discovery of gold in an address to Congress. Soon, waves of immigrants from around the world, later called the "forty-niners", invaded the Gold Country of California or "Mother Lode". Miners lived in tents, wood shanties, or deck cabins removed from abandoned ships. Wherever gold was discovered, hundreds of miners would collaborate to put up a camp and stake their claims.

Because the gold in the California gravel beds was so richly concentrated, the early forty-niners simply panned for gold in California's rivers and streams. However, panning cannot take place on a large scale, and miners and groups of miners graduated to more complex placer mining. Groups of prospectors would divert the water from an entire river into a sluice alongside the river, and then dig for gold in the newly exposed river bottom.

By 1853, most of the easily accessible gold had been collected, and attention turned to extracting gold from more difficult locations. Hydraulic mining was used on ancient gold-bearing gravel beds on hillsides and bluffs in the gold fields. In hydraulic mining, a high-pressure hose directed a powerful stream or jet of water at gold-bearing gravel beds. It is estimated that by the mid-1880s, 11 million troy ounces (340 metric tons) of gold (worth approximately US$16 billion in 2020 prices) had been recovered by "hydraulicking". A consequence of these extraction methods was that large amounts of gravel, silt, heavy metals, and other pollutants were washed into streams and rivers. As of 1999, many areas still bear the scars of hydraulic mining, since the resulting exposed earth and downstream gravel deposits do not support plant life.

It is estimated that by 1855, at least 300,000 gold-seekers, merchants, and other immigrants had arrived in California from around the world. The huge numbers of newcomers brought by the Gold Rush drove Native Americans out of their traditional hunting, fishing and food-gathering areas. To protect their homes and livelihood, some Native Americans responded by attacking the miners, provoking counter-attacks on native villages. The Native Americans, out-gunned, were often slaughtered.

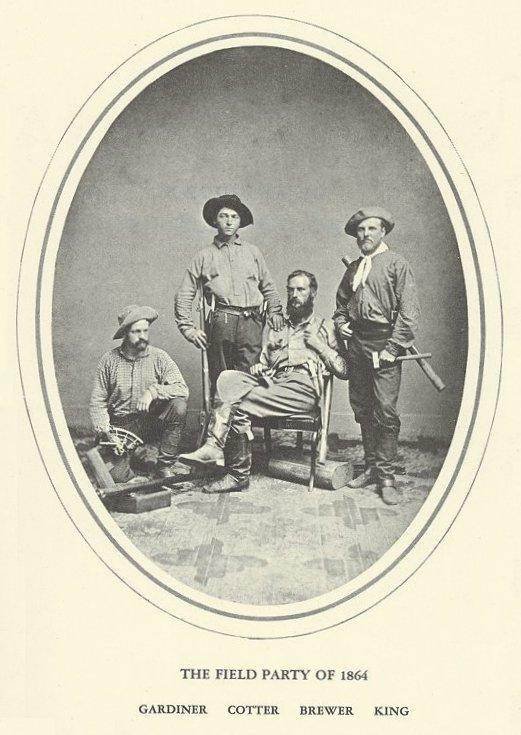
The exploration team for the California Geological Survey, 1864

=== Thorough exploration ===
The Gold Rush populated the western foothills of the Sierra Nevada, but even by 1860, most of the Sierra was unexplored. The state legislature authorized the California Geological Survey to officially explore the Sierra (and survey the rest of the state). Josiah Whitney was appointed to head the survey. Men of the survey, including William H. Brewer, Charles F. Hoffmann and Clarence King, explored the backcountry of what would become Yosemite National Park in 1863. In 1864, they explored the area around Kings Canyon. In 1869, John Muir started his wanderings in the Sierra Nevada range, and in 1871, King was the first to climb Mount Langley, mistakenly believing he had summited Mount Whitney, the highest peak in the range. In 1873, Mount Whitney was climbed for the first time by 3 men from Lone Pine, California, on a fishing trip. From 1892 to 1897 Theodore Solomons made the first attempt to map a route along the crest of the Sierra.

Other people finished exploring and mapping the Sierra. Bolton Coit Brown explored the Kings River watershed in 1895–1899. Joseph N. LeConte mapped the area around Yosemite National Park and what would become Kings Canyon National Park. James S. Hutchinson, a noted mountaineer, climbed the Palisades (1904) and Mount Humphreys (1905). By 1912, the USGS published a set of maps of the Sierra Nevada, and the era of exploration was over.

=== Logging ===
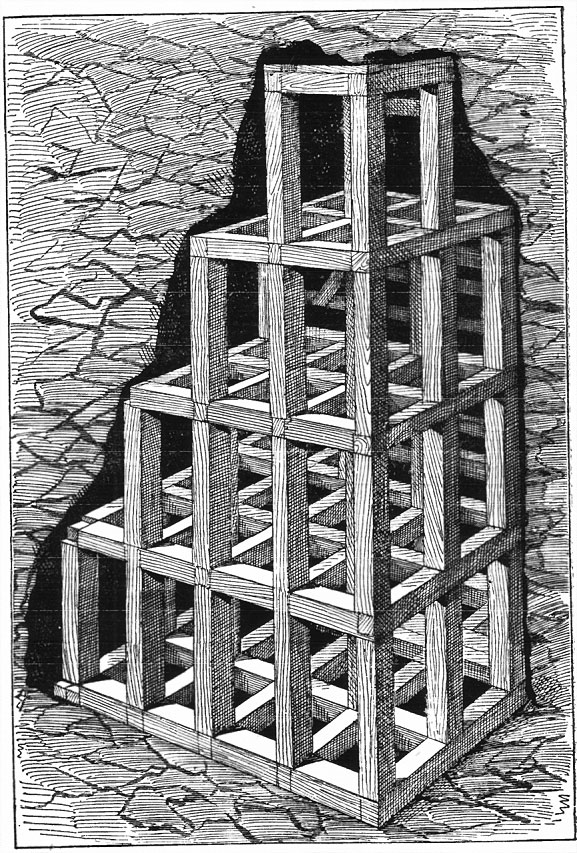
Square-set timbering as used in the Comstock mines, 1877

Logging in the Sierra Nevada has significantly impacted the landscape. The logging industry in the Sierra Nevada started in the early 1800s, when settlers relied on hand tools and ox-teams. Before the California Gold Rush, the industry was relatively small, and most of the lumber used in the state was imported. However, as the demand for lumber to support the mining industry increased, logging became a major industry in the region.

Initially, most of the lumber produced in California was used in mining. The Comstock Lode was a major center for logging, with operations supplying lumber for the construction of mine structures, such as tunnels, shafts, and buildings, as well as fuel for the mines. Dan DeQuille observed in 1876, "the Comstock Lode may truthfully be said to be the tomb of the forests of the Sierra. Millions upon millions of feet of lumber are annually buried in the mines, nevermore to be resurrected."

In the late 1800s, the logging industry moved westward due to the depletion of white pine forests in the upper Midwest. This shift was encouraged by the positive portrayal of the Sierra Nevada as a promising timber region. In 1859, Horace Greely marveled, "I never saw anything so much like good timber in the course of any seventy-five miles' travel as I saw in crossing the Sierra Nevada."

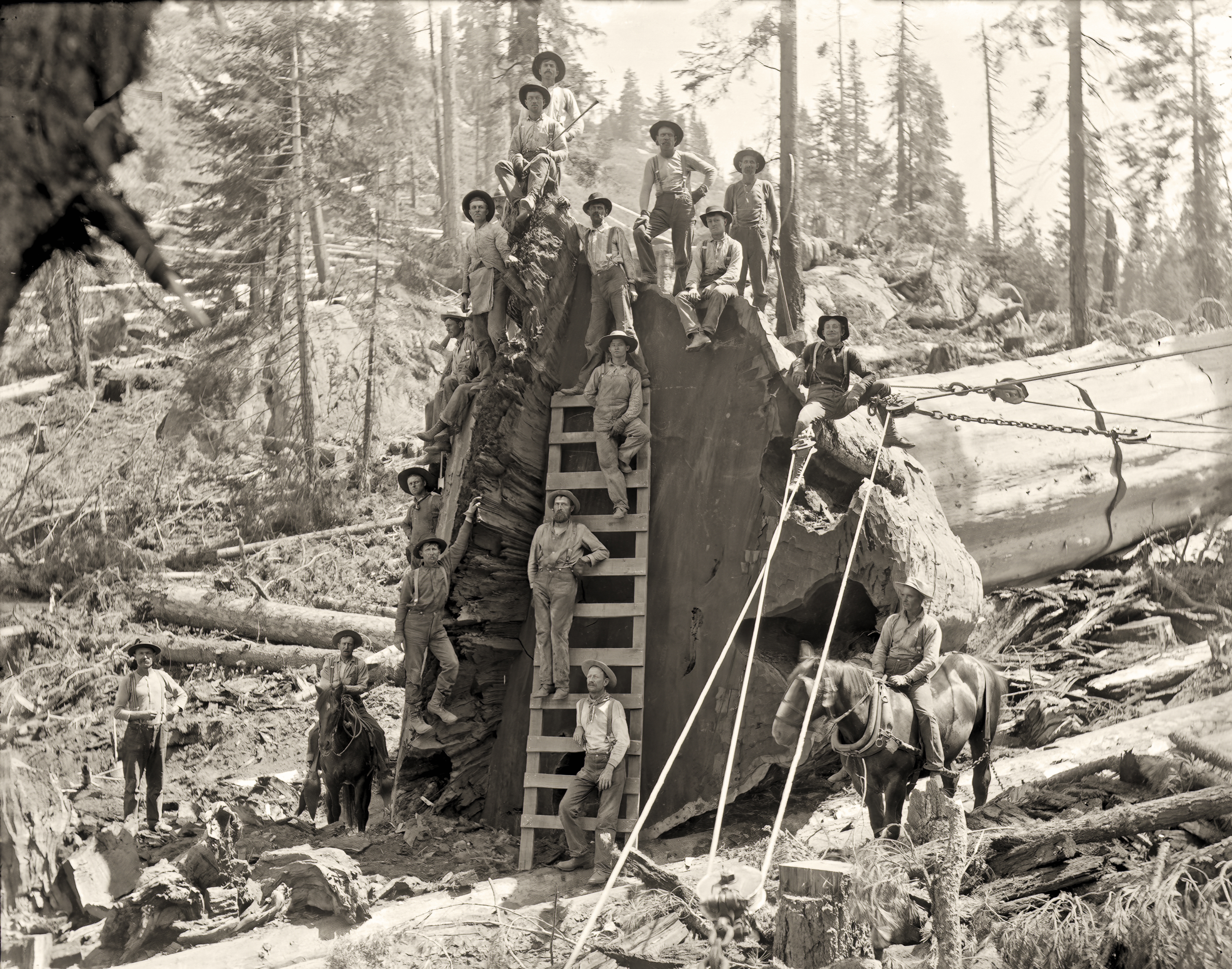
Clearcutting in Converse Basin resulted in a loss of 8,000 giant sequoia.

The logging industry experienced significant growth in the late 1800s due to several factors. The Timber and Stone Act of 1878 allowed individuals to claim ownership of old-growth timber tracts, which were later consolidated under joint-stock companies, such as those founded by Midwestern lumber magnates. These companies had the financial resources to transport timber from remote locations and build sawmills near the tracks of the Southern Pacific railroad which connected the San Joaquin Valley to the rest of the state in the 1870s. This facilitated the nationwide distribution of lumber. In addition, technological advancements, such as the shay locomotive and the v-shaped log flume, made it easier to transport lumber across mountainous terrain.

=== Conservation ===
The General Sherman Tree, a giant sequoia in Sequoia National Park, is the world's largest tree by volume.

The tourism potential of the Sierra Nevada was recognized early in the European history of the range. Yosemite Valley was first protected by the federal government in 1864. The Valley and Mariposa Grove were ceded to California in 1866 and turned into a state park. John Muir perceived overgrazing by sheep and logging of giant sequoia to be a problem in the Sierra. Muir successfully lobbied for the protection of the rest of Yosemite National Park: Congress created an Act to protect the park in 1890. The Valley and Mariposa Grove were added to the Park in 1906. In the same year, Sequoia National Park was formed to protect the Giant Sequoia: all logging of the Sequoia ceased at that time.

In 1903, the city of San Francisco proposed building a hydroelectric dam to flood Hetch Hetchy Valley. The city and the Sierra Club argued over the dam for 10 years, until the U.S. Congress passed the Raker Act in 1913 and allowed dam building to proceed. O'Shaughnessy Dam was completed in 1923.

Between 1912 and 1918, Congress debated three times to protect Lake Tahoe in a national park. None of these efforts succeeded, and after World War II, towns such as South Lake Tahoe grew around the shores of the lake. By 1980, the permanent population of the Lake Tahoe area grew to 50,000, while the summer population grew to 90,000. The development around Lake Tahoe affected the clarity of the lake water. In order to preserve the lake's clarity, construction in the Tahoe basin is currently regulated by the Tahoe Regional Planning Agency.

As the 20th century progressed, more of the Sierra became available for recreation; other forms of economic activity decreased. The John Muir Trail, a trail that followed the Sierra crest from Yosemite Valley to Mount Whitney, was funded in 1915 and finished in 1938. Kings Canyon National Park was formed in 1940 to protect the deep canyon of the Kings River.

In the 1920s, automobile clubs and nearby towns started to lobby for trans-Sierra highways over Piute Pass (which would have closed the gap in SR 168) and other locations. However, by end of the 1920s, the Forest Service and the Sierra Club decided that roadless wilderness in the Sierra was valuable, and fought the proposal. The Piute Pass proposal faded out by the early 1930s, with the Forest Service proposing a route over Minaret Summit in 1933. The Minaret Summit route was lobbied against by California's Governor Ronald Reagan in 1972. The expansion of the John Muir and Ansel Adams Wildernesses in the 1980s sealed off the Minaret Summit route.

A trans-Sierra route between Porterville and Lone Pine was proposed by local businessmen in 1923. Eventually, a circuitous route across the Sierra was built across Sherman Pass by 1976.

By 1964, the Wilderness Act protected portions of the Sierra as primitive areas where humans are simply temporary visitors. Gradually, 20 wilderness areas were established to protect scenic backcountry of the Sierra. These wilderness areas include the John Muir Wilderness (protecting the eastern slope of the Sierra and the area between Yosemite and Kings Canyon Parks), and wilderness within each of the National Parks.

The Sierra Nevada still faces a number of issues that threaten its conservation. Logging occurs on both private and public lands, including controversial clearcut methods and thinning logging on private and public lands. Grazing occurs on private lands as well as on National Forest lands, which include Wilderness areas. Overgrazing can alter hydrologic processes and vegetation composition, remove vegetation that serves as food and habitat for native species, and contribute to sedimentation and pollution in waterways. A recent increase in large wildfires, like the Rim Fire in Yosemite National Park and the Stanislaus National Forest and the King Fire on the Eldorado National Forest, has prompted concerns. A 2015 study indicated that the increase in fire risk in California may be attributable to human-induced climate change. A study looking back over 8,000 years found that warmer climate periods experienced severe droughts and more stand-replacing fires and concluded that as climate is such a powerful influence on wildfires, trying to recreate presettlement forest structure may be difficult in a warmer future.

== See also ==
- Bibliography of the Sierra Nevada
- List of Sierra Nevada road passes
- List of Sierra Nevada topics
- Sierra Nevada (Spain)
